= Maggie Gyllenhaal =

American actress and filmmaker (born 1977)

- Gyllenhaal in 2026
- Born: Margalit Ruth Gyllenhaal; November 16, 1977 (age 49); New York City, U.S.
- Education: Columbia University (BA)
- Occupations: Actress; filmmaker
- Years active: 1992–present
- Spouse: Peter Sarsgaard (m. 2009)
- Children: 2
- Parents: Stephen Gyllenhaal (father); Naomi Foner (mother)
- Family: Gyllenhaal

Margalit Ruth Gyllenhaal Sarsgaard (Note: English pronunciation: /ˈdʒɪlənhɔːl/, JIL-ən-hawl Swedish: [ˈjʏ̂lːɛnˌhɑːl]) (born November 16, 1977), known professionally as Maggie Gyllenhaal, is an American actress and filmmaker. Part of the Gyllenhaal family, she is the daughter of filmmakers Stephen Gyllenhaal and Naomi Achs, and the older sister of actor Jake Gyllenhaal. Her accolades include a Golden Globe Award, and nominations for two Academy Awards, and a BAFTA Awards.

Gyllenhaal began her career taking early roles in Donnie Darko (2001), Adaptation, Confessions of a Dangerous Mind (both 2002), and Mona Lisa Smile (2003). She received Golden Globe Award nominations for her roles in Secretary (2002) and Sherrybaby (2006) and an Academy Award for Best Supporting Actress nomination for playing a single mother in Crazy Heart (2009). She portrayed Rachel Dawes in the superhero film The Dark Knight (2008) and acted in such films as World Trade Center (2006), Nanny McPhee and the Big Bang (2010), Hysteria (2011), Won't Back Down (2012), White House Down (2013), Frank (2014), and The Kindergarten Teacher (2018).

She has starred in several television series, including the BBC political-thriller miniseries The Honourable Woman (2014), which won her a Golden Globe Award for Best Actress and a nomination for a Primetime Emmy Award. She also produced and starred in the HBO period drama series The Deuce (2017–2019). On stage, she made her Broadway debut in a revival of the Tom Stoppard play The Real Thing (2014).

Gyllenhaal made her writing and directing debut with the psychological drama The Lost Daughter (2021), for which she was nominated for the Academy Award for Best Adapted Screenplay and won the Venice Film Festival Award for Best Screenplay. She directed her sophomore film, the gothic romance The Bride! (2026), which she also wrote and produced; it received mixed reviews from critics and was a box office bomb. Later that year, she was named president of the International Jury of the Competition at the 83rd Venice International Film Festival.

== Early life ==
Margalit Ruth Gyllenhaal was born in Manhattan, New York City, on November 16, 1977, to Naomi Achs and Stephen Gyllenhaal. The first name on Maggie's birth certificate is "Margalit", which she did not discover until 2013, when adopting her husband's surname. Margalit (מרגלית) is a Hebrew word and given name meaning "pearl"; some news stories have spelled it "Margolit". She has a younger brother, actor Jake Gyllenhaal, and a half-brother from their father's second marriage.

Her father is a film director and poet, and her mother is a screenwriter and director. Her father, a member of the aristocratic Gyllenhaal family, is of Swedish and English ancestry, and was raised in the Swedenborgian religion. Her last native Swedish ancestor was her great-great-grandfather Anders Leonard Gyllenhaal, a descendant of Leonard Gyllenhaal, a leading Swedenborgian who supported the printing and spreading of Swedenborg's writings.

Her mother was born in New York City (growing up in Brooklyn), and is Jewish, from Ashkenazi Jewish families that emigrated from Russia and Poland. Her mother's first husband was Eric Foner, a noted historian and history professor at Columbia University. Gyllenhaal has stated that she "grew up mostly Jewish, culturally", and she identifies as Jewish, though she did not attend Hebrew school. Her parents married in 1977, and filed for divorce in October 2008.

Gyllenhaal grew up in Los Angeles and studied at the Harvard–Westlake prep school. She spent four months as a student at The Mountain School, a semester school for high school juniors in Vermont. In 1995, she graduated from Harvard–Westlake and moved to New York to attend Columbia University, where she studied literature and Eastern religions. She also studied acting for a summer term at the Royal Academy of Dramatic Art (RADA) in London, England.

== Career ==
=== 1992–2001: Early work ===
At the age of 15, she made a brief appearance in her father's film Waterland (1992). Soon, she had supporting roles in A Dangerous Woman (1993) and Homegrown (1998), which were directed by her father and also featured her brother Jake. With their mother, she and Jake appeared in two episodes of Molto Mario, an Italian cooking show on the Food Network. After graduating from college, she had supporting roles in films including Cecil B. Demented (2000) and Riding in Cars with Boys (2001). Gyllenhaal later achieved recognition in her own right playing her real brother's on-screen sister in the indie cult favorite Donnie Darko (2001).

She made her theatrical debut in the Berkeley Repertory Theatre production of Patrick Marber's Closer, for which she received favorable reviews. Production started in May 2000 and ended in mid-July of that year. Gyllenhaal has performed in several other plays, including The Tempest, Antony and Cleopatra, The Butterfly Project, and No Exit.

=== 2002–2005: Film breakthrough ===
Gyllenhaal's breakout role was in the black comedy, Secretary (2002), a film about two people who embark on a mutually fulfilling BDSM lifestyle. The New York Times critic Stephen Holden noted: "The role of Lee, which Maggie Gyllenhaal imbues with a restrained comic delicacy and sweetness, should make her a star." Mick LaSalle of the San Francisco Chronicle wrote: "Maggie Gyllenhaal, as the self-destructive secretary, is enigmatic and, at moments, sympathetic." The film received generally favorable reviews, and Gyllenhaal's performance earned her the Best Breakthrough Performance by an Actress award from the National Board of Review of Motion Pictures, her first Golden Globe nomination, and an Independent Spirit Award nomination. Secretary was Gyllenhaal's first film role which featured full frontal nudity. Impressed with the script, she initially had reservations about doing the film, which she believed could deliver an anti-feminist message. However, after carefully discussing the script with the film's director, Steven Shainberg, she agreed to join the project. Although insisting Shainberg did not exploit her, Gyllenhaal has said she felt "scared when filming began" and that "in the wrong hands ... even in just slightly less intelligent hands, this movie could say something really weird." Since then, she is guarded about discussing her role in the film, saying only that "despite myself, sometimes the dynamic that you are exploring in your work spills over into your life."

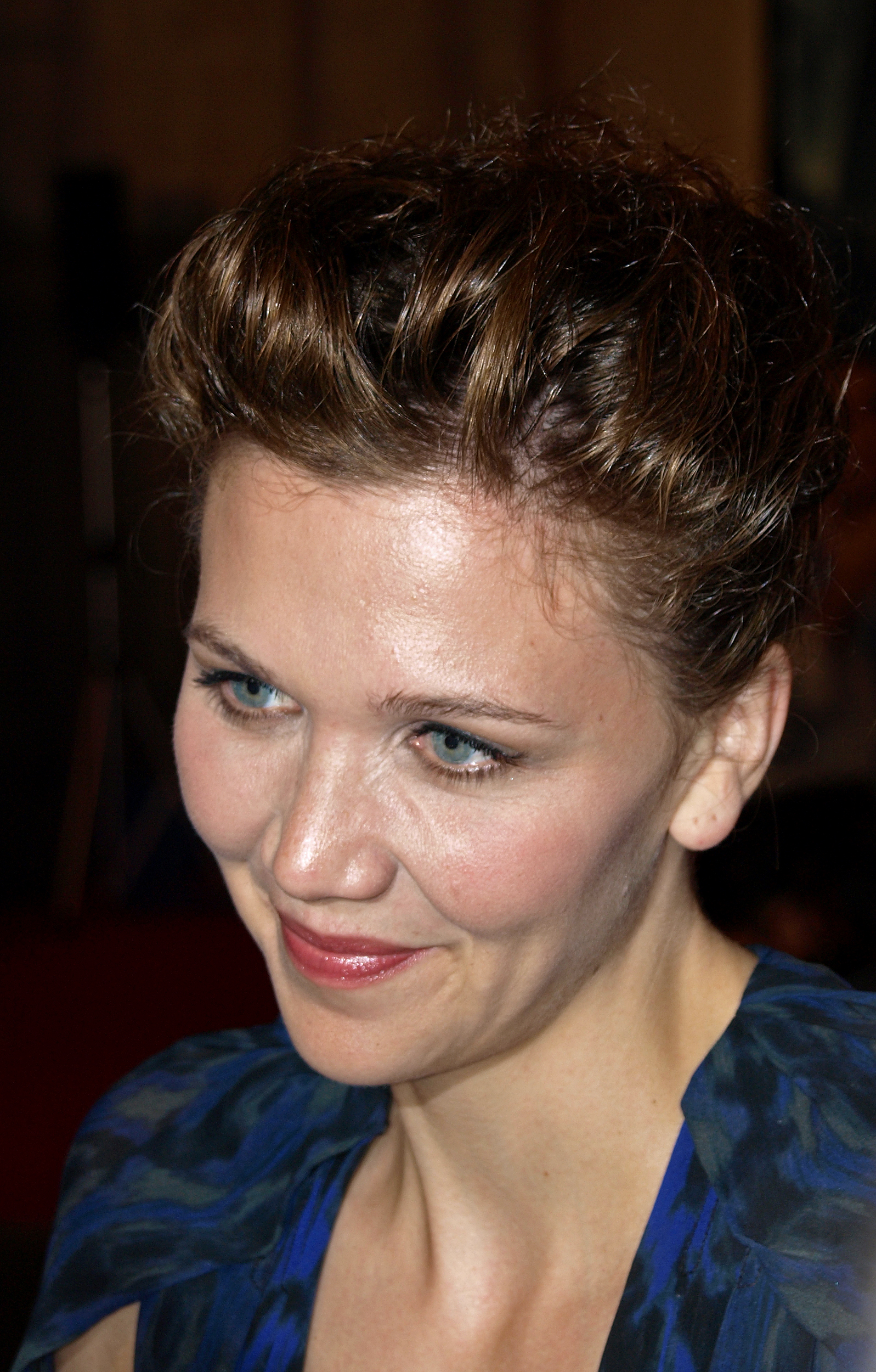
Gyllenhaal at an event in Barcelona, 2008

Next, she had a supporting role in the comedy-drama Adaptation (2002), a film that tells the story of screenwriter Charlie Kaufman's struggle to adapt The Orchid Thief into a film. She later appeared in the unauthorized biography Confessions of a Dangerous Mind (2002), part of an ensemble cast that included Sam Rockwell, Drew Barrymore, George Clooney, and Julia Roberts. The movie grossed US$33 million worldwide. That same year, she had a small role in the comedy 40 Days and 40 Nights. In 2003, she co-starred with Julia Roberts in Mona Lisa Smile in the role of Giselle. In an interview with The Daily Telegraph, she revealed the reason for accepting the role was "to play somebody who feels confident in herself as a sexy, beautiful woman". The film generated mostly mixed reviews, with Manohla Dargis of the Los Angeles Times describing it as "smug and reductive". Her next roles were in smaller independent films: Casa de los Babys (2003), is a story about six American women impatiently waiting out their lengthy residency requirements in a South American country before picking up their adoptive babies, and Criminal (2004), a remake of the Argentinian film Nine Queens, with John C. Reilly and Diego Luna. Gyllenhaal plays an honest hotel manager forced to help her crooked brother (Reilly) by seducing one of his victims.

She starred in the HBO film Strip Search (2004), in which she portrayed an American student in China suspected of terrorism. For her role, Gyllenhaal had to perform multiple scenes of full-frontal nudity as the film tackled issues of strip searches. In 2004, Gyllenhaal returned to theater in a Los Angeles production of Tony Kushner's Homebody/ Kabul as Priscilla, the Homebody's daughter, who spends most of the play searching for her elusive mother in Kabul, Afghanistan. Kushner gave her the role in Homebody/ Kabul on the strength of her performance in Closer. Ben Brantley of The New York Times wrote: "Ms. Gyllenhaal provides the essential bridge between the parts of the play's title." John Heilpern of The New York Observer noted that Gyllenhaal's performance was "compelling". Finally in 2004, Gyllenhaal was invited to join the Academy of Motion Picture Arts and Sciences. Viewed as a sex symbol, she was ranked in the "Hot 100 List" by Maxim magazine in 2004 and 2005.

Gyllenhaal's next film role was in the 2005 comedy-drama Happy Endings, in which she played an adventuress singer who seduces a young gay musician (Jason Ritter) as well as his rich father (Tom Arnold). She recorded songs for the film's soundtrack, calling the role the "roughest, scariest acting ever" and adding she is more natural when singing on screen than when acting. Lisa Schwarzbaum of Entertainment Weekly declared Gyllenhaal's performance "as wonderfully, naturally slouchy-sexy as her character is artificial".

=== 2006–2009: Comedies, dramas and theater ===
Following Happy Endings, Gyllenhaal appeared in five films releases in 2006: Trust the Man, Stranger than Fiction, Monster House, World Trade Center, and Sherrybaby. In Trust the Man, featuring Julianne Moore, David Duchovny, and Billy Crudup, she played Elaine, who has been dating Tobey, Crudup's character, for seven years and has begun to feel that it is time for her to settle down and start a family. The film was critically and financially unsuccessful. Ethan Alter of Premiere felt that the performances by Gyllenhaal and Duchovny were "much more at ease" and concluded with "that's probably because they're [sic] played these characters many times before". In Stranger than Fiction, Gyllenhaal played a love interest of Harold Crick, played by Will Ferrell. Her performance in the film received favorable reviews; Mike Straka of Fox News wrote: "Gyllenhaal has never been sexier in any film before and her interplay with Ferrell will propel her to more A-list films, leaving her indie-darling days behind, no doubt." She voiced Elizabeth "Zee" in the animated horror film Monster House. Gyllenhaal played Allison Jimeno, the wife of Port Authority officer Will Jimeno, in Oliver Stone's World Trade Center, based on the September 11 attacks in New York City. She regarded this as "one of the films she most enjoyed making". The film received favorable reviews and proved to be an international success, earning US$162 million worldwide.

In Sherrybaby, Gyllenhaal played a young drug-addicted thief trying to put her life in order after prison so she can reconcile with her daughter. During promotion of the film, she noted of her portrayal of the character: "I think she's in such dire straits that all she has are these kind of naive, fierce hopes. And while I was playing the part I was looking for pleasure and hope in everything, even in these really bleak things. And so it was really mostly after I finished the movie that I felt pain." Her performance in the film was well-received; David Germain of the Associated Press wrote, "Gyllenhaal humanizes her so deeply and richly ... that Sherry elicits sympathy even in her darkest and weakest moments", and Dennis Harvey of Variety magazine called her performance "naturalistic". For her performance, Gyllenhaal earned a second Golden Globe Best Actress nomination and won the Best Actress category award at the 2006 Stockholm International Film Festival.

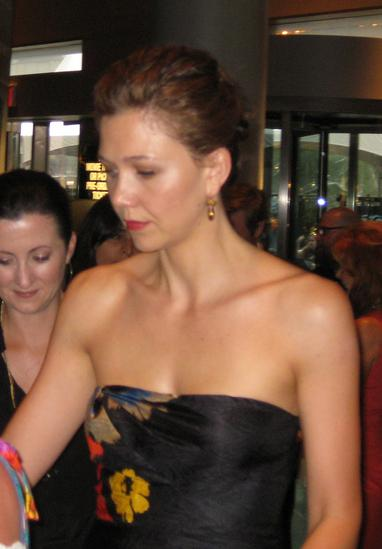
Gyllenhaal at the premiere of The Dark Knight in New York City, July 14, 2008

She appeared in The Dark Knight (2008), the sequel to Batman Begins (2005), in which she replaced Katie Holmes as Gotham City's assistant district attorney Rachel Dawes. Gyllenhaal acknowledged her character was a damsel in distress to an extent, but said director Christopher Nolan sought ways to empower her character, so "Rachel's really clear about what's important to her and unwilling to compromise her morals, which made a nice change" from the many conflicted characters she had previously portrayed. The Dark Knight was a critical and commercial success, setting a new opening weekend box office record for North America. With revenue of $1 billion worldwide, it became the fourth-highest-grossing film of all time, and remains Gyllenhaal's most commercially successful feature to date. In a Salon magazine review of the film, Stephanie Zacharek called Gyllenhaal's character "a tough cookie in a Stanwyck-style bias-cut gown" and stated that "the movie feels smarter and more supple when she's on-screen". IGN film critic Todd Gilchrist wrote, "Gyllenhaal adds real depth and energy to Rachel Dawes".

In addition to film, Gyllenhaal played Yelena Andreevna in the Classic Stage Company's 2009 Off-Broadway production of Anton Chekhov's Uncle Vanya in New York City. The cast also included her husband Peter Sarsgaard. The production, directed by Austin Pendleton, began previews on January 17 and ended its limited run on March 1. Joe Dziemianowicz of the New York Daily News was unenthusiastic about her performance, writing "Gyllenhaal, who was so dynamic as a druggie in the film Sherrybaby, plays Yelena with a slow-mo saunter and monotonous pasted-on smile that makes it seem as if she's been in Sherry's stash." However, Malcolm Johnson of the Hartford Courant was complimentary, noting that she "ultimately blossoms" as the character.

Gyllenhaal agreed to star in the comedy Away We Go (2009), in which she plays a bohemian college professor who is an old friend of John Krasinski's character. The film generated broadly mixed reviews, with Owen Gleiberman of Entertainment Weekly describing Gyllenhaal's subplot as "over-the-top". However, A. O. Scott of The New York Times praised Gyllenhaal and co-star Allison Janney for their performances, writing that "both [are] quite funny". Scott concluded with, "Ms. Gyllenhaal's line about sex roles in 'the seahorse community' is the screenplay's one clean satirical bull's-eye". Her next role came in the musical-drama Crazy Heart, in which she played journalist Jean Craddock, who falls for musician Bad Blake, played by Jeff Bridges, whose performance won the Academy Award for Best Actor. The film was acclaimed, as was Gyllenhaal's performance. Peter Travers of Rolling Stone observed that Gyllenhaal was "funny, touching and vital as Jean" and that her part was "conventionally conceived, but Gyllenhaal plays it with a tough core of intelligence and feeling." Her performance earned her an Academy Award nomination for Best Supporting Actress.

=== 2010–2020: Independent films and television ===
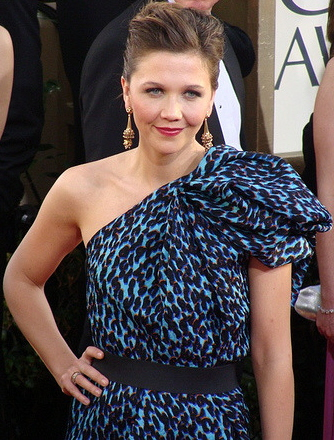
Gyllenhaal at the 66th Golden Globe Awards, 2009

In addition to acting, she presented 13 episodes of the PBS television series Independent Lens between 2009 and 2010. The program presents documentary films made by independent filmmakers. In 2010, Gyllenhaal appeared in Nanny McPhee and the Big Bang with co-star Emma Thompson, the sequel to the 2005's Nanny McPhee. She played Isabel Green, which required her to speak with an English accent. The feature received generally positive reviews; review aggregator Rotten Tomatoes gave the film an approval rating of 76% based on 119 critics. The Sydney Morning Herald complimented Gyllenhaal's realistic accent and ability to capture her English character with ease. It was a reasonable success at the box office, earning $93 million worldwide.

For her next film, Gyllenhaal starred in the biographical romance Hysteria (2011), which focuses on the events that led to the creation of the vibrator during the Victorian era. The film received a mixed reception; writing for The Guardian, David Cox noted the film's stereotypes and "yelps of delight", and praised Gyllenhaal's English accent. In February 2011, Gyllenhaal starred in another Anton Chekhov Off-Broadway production as the character Masha in Austin Pendleton's Three Sisters at the Classic Stage Company. The play focused on the Prozorov sisters (Gyllenhaal, Jessica Hecht, and Juliet Rylance), who are "unlucky in love, unhappy in the provinces and longing to return to Moscow", as summarized by Bloomberg's Jeremy Gerard. The production began preview performances on January 12, with a limited engagement through March 6.

In 2012, she played mother Jaime Fitzpatrick in the drama Won't Back Down, about a group of parents involved in a parent trigger takeover of a failing school. Next, she appeared alongside Channing Tatum and Jamie Foxx, as a Secret Service agent in the action-thriller White House Down (2013). The film was met with mixed reviews and under-performed at the box office. A year later, she starred in the musical comedy Frank, about a man who joins an odd band with a group of bizarre musicians. Gyllenhaal, who also plays a musician, said she initially turned down the role because she did not understand it. However, she changed her mind after the story "stuck with her". The film premiered at the 2014 Sundance Film Festival to favorable opinions; Slant magazine's critic opined that Gyllenhaal has "passive and palpable screen presence". Also that year, she played Hathfertiti in Matthew Barney and Jonathan Bepler's River of Fundament, loosely based on the 1983 novel Ancient Evenings by Norman Mailer.

Gyllenhaal played the lead role as Baroness Nessa Stein, a British-Israeli businesswoman heiress in the BBC political spy thriller television miniseries, The Honourable Woman. The series was well received; Kevin Fallon wrote in the Daily Beast: "Gyllenhaal delivers what might be the most towering, complex, best performance of her career in the miniseries." Time magazine praised the series' pacing, themes, settings, and called Gyllenhaal's performance "remarkable". At the 72nd Golden Globe Awards, she won Best Actress in a Miniseries or Television Film for her performance. The Honourable Woman appeared in a list of The Guardian critics' 30 best television shows of 2014.

In 2016, Gyllenhaal narrated Leo Tolstoy's novel Anna Karenina; it was made available for purchase on Amazon's Audible store. In an interview, Gyllenhaal said "Making this, doing this, I feel like it's one of the major accomplishments of my work life." Returning to film in 2018, Gyllenhaal starred in The Kindergarten Teacher, a drama in which her character becomes obsessed with a student whom she believes is a child prodigy. The film premiered at the 2018 Sundance Film Festival, and was distributed via Netflix. It is a remake of the 2014 Israeli film of the same name. The feature opened to mainly popular reviews; The Daily Telegraph critic gave the film 4 out of 5 stars, and thought Gyllenhaal was well-cast, writing "[her] earnest intensity as an actress, gift for fatigue and slightly holier-than-thou authority are key assets here." Although Dennis Harvey of Variety magazine praised her performance, he thought the film lacked "psychological insight".

She served as a producer and starred in the HBO drama series The Deuce, which aired from 2017 to 2019. Gyllenhaal played Eileen "Candy" Merrell, a sex worker during the Golden Age of Porn. The Deuce earned her a Golden Globe nomination for Best Actress.

=== 2021–present: Filmmaking ===
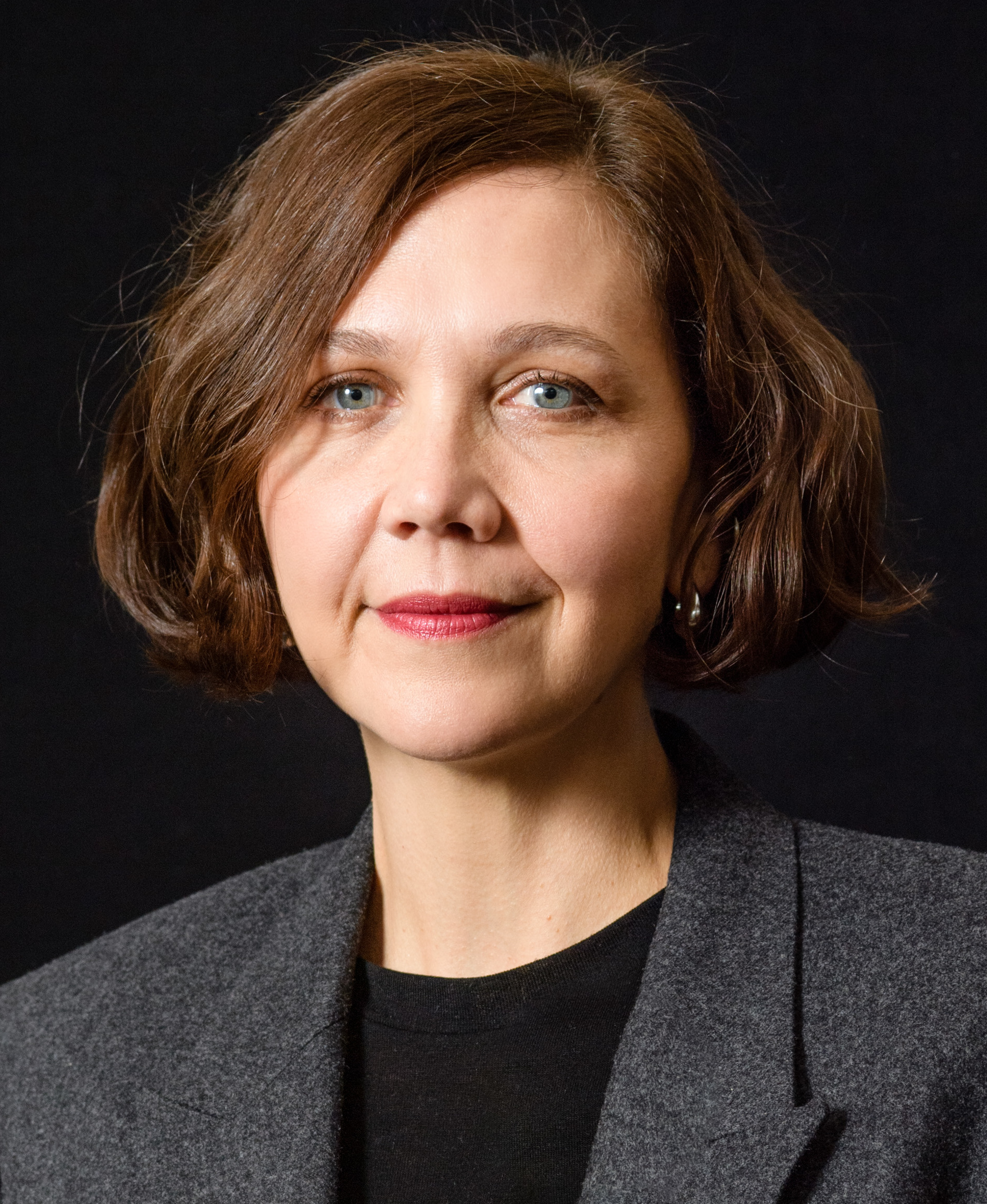
Gyllenhaal in 2021

In 2021, Gyllenhaal made her feature directorial debut with the psychological drama The Lost Daughter, which she also produced and adapted from a novella by Elena Ferrante. The film received critical acclaim, and had its premiere at the 78th Venice International Film Festival, where Gyllenhaal won the Best Screenplay Award. It received four awards, including Best Feature and Breakthrough Director, as well as one further nomination at the 2021 Gotham Awards. At the 79th Golden Globe Awards, Gyllenhaal received a nomination for Best Director. She then received a Best Adapted Screenplay nomination at the 75th British Academy Film Awards, and the second Academy Award nomination of her career also for Best Adapted Screenplay at the 94th Academy Awards.

Gyllenhaal directed The Bride! (2026), a 1930s-set adaptation of Frankenstein, starring Christian Bale, Jessie Buckley, her husband Peter, and her brother Jake. The movie bombed in the box office and received lukewarm reviews from the critics.

== Other activities ==
=== Advertising ===
Gyllenhaal has featured in advertising campaigns for various fashion brands, including Miu Miu (2004), photographed by Terry Richardson; Agent Provocateur (2007), photographed by Alice Hawkins; AGL (2016), photographed by Bryan Adams; Lafayette 148 (2023), photographed by Jody Rogac; and Eton Shirts (2025), photographed by Gray Sorrenti.

=== Film festivals ===
In February 2017, Gyllenhaal served as a member of the jury for the 2017 Berlin Film Festival, chaired by Paul Verhoeven.

In 2021, she served as a member of the jury for the 2021 Cannes Film Festival, chaired by Spike Lee.

In 2026, she was named president of the International Jury of the Competition at the 83rd Venice International Film Festival.

== Personal life ==
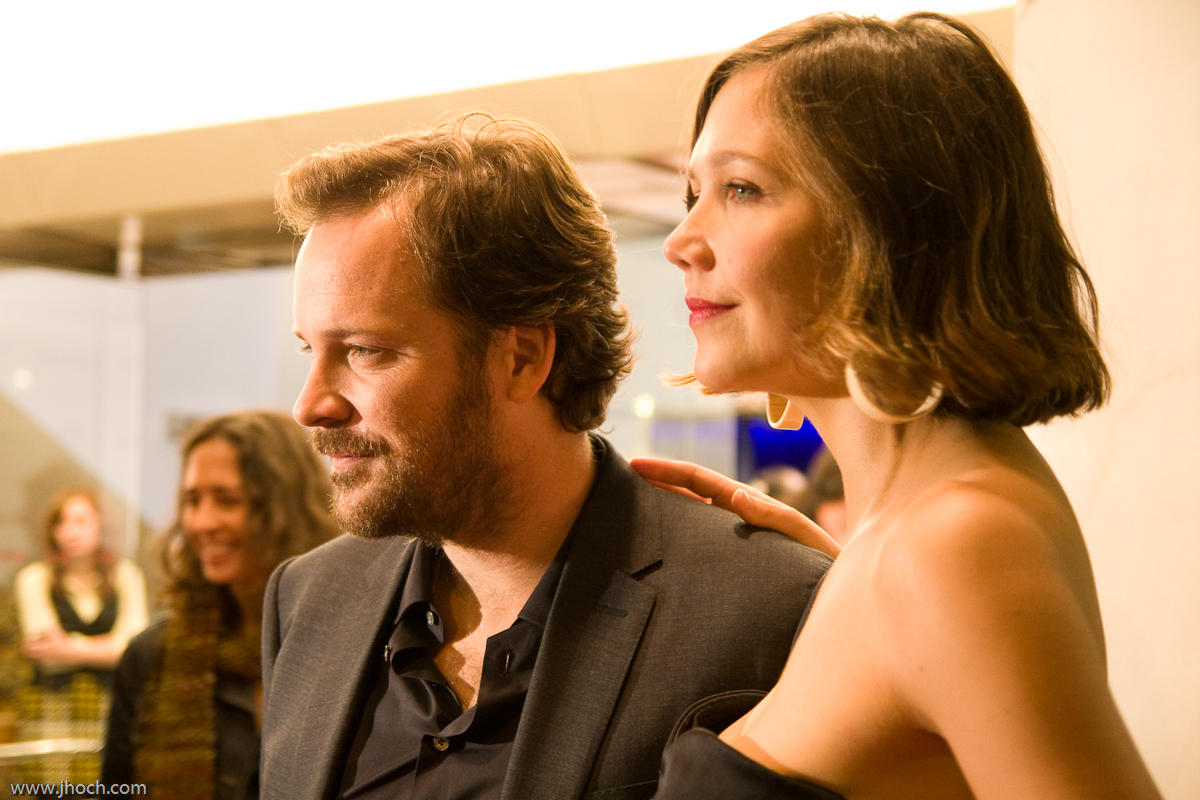
Sarsgaard and Gyllenhaal at the New York premiere of An Education, 2009

In 2002, Gyllenhaal began a relationship with actor Peter Sarsgaard. The couple became engaged in April 2006, and married on May 2, 2009, in a small chapel in Brindisi, Italy. The couple have two daughters. On May 9, 2025, Gyllenhaal's elder daughter, Ramona, was arrested for protesting in Columbia University against Israel's actions in the Gaza war.

The family briefly resided on Greenwich Street in Manhattan from 2005 to 2006 before moving to a 3,600-square-foot townhouse in Park Slope, Brooklyn, where they resided from 2006 to 2019.

== Political views ==
At the 18th Independent Spirit Awards in 2003, she spoke out against the Iraq war, stating the reason for the invasion was "oil and imperialism". In 2005, Gyllenhaal drew controversy for her statement that the September 11 attacks were "an occasion to be brave enough to ask some serious questions about America's role in the world ... It is always useful as individuals or nations to ask how we may have knowingly or unknowingly contributed to this conflict." Gyllenhaal took part in Artists United to Win Without War, a campaign started by Robert Greenwald that aimed to advance progressive causes and voicing opposition to the Iraq War.

She and her brother Jake filmed a commercial for Rock the Vote, and visited the University of Southern California to encourage students to vote in the 2004 US presidential election, in which she supported John Kerry. Gyllenhaal supported Barack Obama in the 2008 presidential election. She has campaigned on behalf of the American Civil Liberties Union (ACLU), an organization her family strongly supports. In June 2013, Gyllenhaal and numerous other celebrities appeared in a video showing support for whistleblower Chelsea Manning.

== Philanthropy ==
Gyllenhaal is a supporter of Witness, a non-profit organization that uses video and online technologies to expose human rights violations. She co-hosted a benefit dinner with founder Peter Gabriel in November 2007. Gyllenhaal helped raise funds for TrickleUp.org, another non-profit that helps people in poverty to start a micro-enterprise. For one of the fundraisers, Gyllenhaal helped design and promote a necklace that sold for US$100; all proceeds from sales went to the charity. Since 2008, Gyllenhaal has been supporting the Hear the World Foundation as ambassador. In her role, she advocates for equal opportunities and better quality of life for people with hearing loss. In October 2008, she hosted a fashion show called "Fashionably Natural", which was presented by Gen Art and SoyJoy in Los Angeles. The show featured new designers who worked only with natural and eco-friendly fabrics and materials. Gyllenhaal is an advocate of Planned Parenthood; in 2012 she said, "Women's health is very important to me. It has become such a politicized issue and so I will make every effort to elect officials who believe as strongly as I do that all women ... have access to quality health care and information."

== Filmography ==
=== Film ===
Year	Title	Role	Notes	Ref(s)
1992	Waterland	Maggie Ruth		
1993	A Dangerous Woman	Patsy		
1998	Homegrown	Christina		
2000	The Photographer	Mira		
2000	Cecil B. Demented	Raven		
2001	Donnie Darko	Elizabeth Darko		
2001	Riding in Cars with Boys	Amelia Forrester		
2002	Secretary	Lee Holloway		
2002	40 Days and 40 Nights	Sam		
2002	Adaptation	Caroline Cunningham		
2002	Confessions of a Dangerous Mind	Debbie		
2003	Casa de los Babys	Jennifer		
2003	Mona Lisa Smile	Giselle Levy		
2004	The Pornographer: A Love Story	Sidney		
2004	Criminal	Valerie		
2005	Happy Endings	Jude		
2005	The Great New Wonderful	Emme	Segment: "Emme's Story"	
2005	Trust the Man	Elaine		
2006	Sherrybaby	Sherry Swanson		
2006	Paris, je t'aime	Liz	Segment: "Quartier des Enfants Rouges"	
2006	Monster House	Elizabeth "Zee"	Voice role	
2006	World Trade Center	Allison Jimeno		
2006	Stranger than Fiction	Ana Pascal		
2007	High Falls	April	Short film	
2008	The Dark Knight	Rachel Dawes		
2009	Away We Go	Ellen "LN"		
2009	Crazy Heart	Jean Craddock		
2010	Nanny McPhee and the Big Bang	Isabel Green		
2011	Hysteria	Charlotte Dalrymple		
2012	Won't Back Down	Jamie		
2013	White House Down	Carol Finnerty		
2014	Frank	Clara		
2014	River of Fundament	Hathfertiti #2		
2016	Beauty Mark	Valerie	Short film	
2016	Home	Ruth	Short film	
2018	The Kindergarten Teacher	Lisa Spinelli	Also producer	
2020	Best Summer Ever	TV Reporter	Also executive producer	
2021	The Lost Daughter	—N/a	Director, writer, and producer	
2026	The Bride!	—N/a	Director, writer, and producer	
2026	Flesh Impact	—N/a	Short film, also writer and director	

Key
†	Denotes films that have not yet been released

=== Television ===
Year	Title	Role	Notes	Ref(s)
1996	Shattered Mind	Clothes clerk	Television film	
1998	The Patron Saint of Liars	Lorraine Thomas	Television film	
1999	Resurrection	Mary	Television film	
1999	Shake, Rattle, and Roll: An American Love Story	Noreen Bixler	Television film	
2004	Strip Search	Linda Sykes	Television film	
2012	Curiosity	Host	Documentary series, episode: "Why is Sex Fun?"	
2012	The Corrections	Denise	Unaired pilot	
2014	The Honourable Woman	Nessa Stein, Baroness Stein of Tilbury	Miniseries, 8 episodes	
2016	Inside Amy Schumer	Herself	Episode: "Brave"	
2016	Truth and Power	Narrator	Documentary series	
2017–2019	The Deuce	Eileen "Candy" Merrell	25 episodes, also producer	

=== Theatre ===
Year	Title	Role	Notes	Ref(s)
2000	Closer	Alice	Berkeley Repertory Theatre, Mark Taper Forum	
2003	Homebody/Kabul	Priscilla Ceiling	Mark Taper Forum, Brooklyn Academy of Music	
2009	Uncle Vanya	Yelena Andreevna	Classic Stage Company	
2011	Three Sisters	Masha Kulygina	Classic Stage Company	
2014	The Real Thing	Annie	American Airlines Theatre	
2017	Damn Yankees	Lola	Stephen Sondheim Theatre	

== See also ==
- List of actors with Academy Award nominations
- List of actors with more than one Academy Award nomination in the acting categories
- List of siblings with Academy Award acting nominations
- List of Jewish Academy Award winners and nominees
