= James Lee Byars =

American contemporary artist (1932 - 1997)

- Born: April 10, 1932; Detroit, Michigan, United States
- Died: May 23, 1997 (aged 65); Cairo, Egypt
- Known for: Sculpture, performance
- Notable work: The Death of James Lee Byars (1982/1994)
- Movement: Conceptual art, performance art

James Lee Byars (April 10, 1932 – May 23, 1997) was an American conceptual artist and performance artist specializing in installations and sculptures, as well as a self-considered mystic. He was best known for his use of personal esoteric motifs, and his creative persona that has been described as 'half dandified trickster and half minimalist seer'. Byars was born Detroit, Michigan, and died in Cairo, Egypt.

Byars' notable performance works include The Death of James Lee Byars and The Perfect Smile, and in terms of multiple sculptures, the many letters he wrote that were composed as decorated sculptures.

== Themes and motifs in his works ==
"The room you dare not enter is golden and gleaming, both sunset and sunrise. I like the fact that the current incarnation is dated right there on the wall label as 1994 – 2004. Is Byars, who supposedly died of cancer in Cairo in 1997, still alive? Or are some mysterious death-bed instructions being followed? Is someone channeling him? You thought art was about life. Wrong. In a sense, every artist’s every artwork is a memorial."

— John Perrault, "James Lee Byars at the Whitney", 2004

Byars' works are often noted as constantly incorporating specific personal themes and motifs, leaning towards the esoteric while simultaneously being ritualistic and materialistic: Robert Clark, writing for The Guardian on the occasion of a Milton Keynes exhibition of his work, described it as 'impenetrably yet intriguingly hermetic'. Most in particular was gold as a material, which served as an elemental identifier. As well as this, works of his demonstrate a fascination with the symbolism of numbers: Clark quotes in the same exhibition, referring to a specific piece of his, writing that he 'imbued the number 100 with symbolic significance, having made a symmetrical arrangement of 100 white marbles and draping 100 nude volunteers in a collective red garment'.

A common theme in his works is perfection (especially upon the word 'Perfect'), which he extended into a personal journey that led to his ambiguously celebratory exploration of shapes, numbers and precious materials. A MoMA text explaining his oeuvre, in the context of his piece The Table of Perfect, noted that while it "looks pristine, it—like any other object—can only ever exist as a sign of perfection and can never embody the total concept."

Byars was in 1972 the first artist invited to visit the physics laboratory CERN in Geneva—an event that was featured on the cover of the CERN Courier. Later many artists have passed through the laboratory, since 2012 mainly within the framework of the Arts at CERN programme. Arts resulting from his visit to CERN was exposed at Massachusetts Museum of Contemporary Art in 2004 and is digitally available from the Harvard Art Museums.

The American artist Matthew Barney played Byars in the film River of Fundament (2014), a work loosely based on the Norman Mailer novel Ancient Evenings. Barney has argued,

I think Byars had this Egyptian subtext through his work. [...] Ancient Evenings is to do with the ambition of the Pharaoh and the ambition of the nobleman to live again and again and again. So there's something about Byars that has always interested me in his work to do with its ambition to become pure gold and its failure to be pure gold. It's always a veneer. It wants to be something it can't be. And I love that about the work, I love the theatre of it.

Byars also showed fascination in predicting his own death and others' deaths.

== Exhibitions ==
Solo exhibitions include:

- 1961 Willard Gallery, New York, NY
- 1964 1 by 50 Foot Drawing, Carnegie Institute, Pittsburgh, PA
- 1967 The Giant Man of Water Soluble Paper and Dissolved on 53rd Street, Museum of Contemporary Crafts, New York, NY
- 1968 Participatory Events with Communal Garments, The Architectural League of New York, New York
- 1970 The Gold Curb, Metropolitan Museum of Art, New York, NY
- 1971 The Black Book, Galerie Michael Werner, Cologne, West Germany
- 1974 The Perfect Love Letter, Palais des Beaux-Arts, Brussels, Belgium
- 1975 The Perfect Kiss, Pavilion Denon, Musėe de Louvre, Paris, France
- 1977 The First Total Interrogative Philosophy, Stădtisches Museum, Mönchengladbach, West Germany
- 1978 The Perfect Kiss, University Art Museum, University of California at Berkeley, Berkeley, CA
- 1980 The Exhibition of Perfect, Busch-Reisinger Museum, Harvard University, Cambridge, MA
- 1981 The Perfect Kiss, The Perfect Cheek, The Perfect Fragrance, Foundation de Appel, Amsterdam, the Netherlands
- 1983 Stedelijk van Abbemuseum, Eindhoven, The Netherlands
- 1983 Musėe d'Art Moderne de la Ville de Paris, Paris, France
- 1984 The Perfect Quiet, ICA, Boston, MA
- 1985 Galerie Michael Werner, Cologne, West Germany
- 1985 Mary Boone Gallery, New York, NY
- 1986 James Lee Byars - Palast der Philosophie/The Philosophical Palace, Kunsthalle Dűsseldorf, Dűsseldorf, West Germany
- 1988 Mary Boone Gallery, New York, NY
- 1989 Mary Boone Gallery, New York, NY
- 1989 James Lee Byars - The Palace of Good Luck, Castello di Rivoli, Museo d'Arte Contemporanea, Turin, Italy
- 1990 The Perfect Thought, University Art Museum, University of California at Berkeley, Berkeley, CA
- 1990 The Perfect Thought, Contemporary Arts Museum, Houston, TX
- 1992 Konsthall, Stockholm, Sweden
- 1993 Sonne, Mond und Sterne, Wűrttembergischer Kunstverein, Stuttgart, Germany
- 1994 Graphische Răume Museum Ludwig, Cologne, Germany
- 1994 James Lee Byars - The Perfect Moment, IVAM Centre del Carme, Valencia, Spain
- 1995 Fondation Cartier pour l'art Contemporain, Paris, France
- 1996 The Monument of Language - James Lee Byars, The Henry Moore Institute, Leeds, England
- 1997 James Lee Byars - The Palace of Perfect, Fundaçao de Serralves, Porto, Portugal
- 1998 James Lee Byars - Four Early Drawings and a Black Figure on the Floor, Michael Werner Gallery, New York, NY
- 1998 The Arts Club of Chicago, Chicago, IL
- 2001 Letters to Joseph Beuys, Museum fur Kommunikation, Frankfurt, Germany
- 2003 The Moon Books: Above and Below, An Exhibition of James Lee Byars, Michael Werner Gallery, New York, NY
- 2004 James Lee Byars: Letters from the World's Most Famous Unknown Artist, Massachusetts Museum of Contemporary Art, North Adams, MA
- 2004 James Lee Byars: Life, Love and Death, Schirn Kunsthalle, Frankfurt, Germany
- 2004 James Lee Byars: The Perfect Silence, Whitney Museum of American Art, New York, NY
- 2005 Barbican Art Gallery, London, England
- 2006 The Rest Is Silence: James Lee Byars, Perry Rubenstein Gallery, New York, NY
- 2006 The Rest Is Silence: James Lee Byars, Michael Werner Gallery, New York, NY
- 2006 The Rest Is Silence: James Lee Byars, Mary Boone Gallery, New York, NY
- 2008 Im [sic] Full of Byars: James Lee Byars - Eine Hommage, Kunstmuseum Bern, Switzerland
- 2008 Milton Keynes Gallery, London, England
- 2012 Klein / Byars / Kapoor, Musee d'Art Moderne et d'Art Contemporain, Nice, France
- 2012 ARoS Kunstmuseum, Aarhus, Denmark
- 2013 James Lee Byars: 1/2 an Autobiography, Museo Jumex, Mexico City, Mexico
- 2014 MoMA PS1, New York, NY
- 2014 FLEX, Kent Fine Art, New York, NY
- 2014 James Lee Byars, Random Institute, Zűrich, Switzerland
- 2023 James Lee Byars, PirelliHangar Bicocca, Milan, Italy

Group shows include:

- 1972 Documenta 5, Museum Fridericianum, Kassel, West Germany
- 1977 Documenta 6, Museum Fridericianum, Kassel, West Germany
- 1980 La Biennale di Venezia, Venice, Italy
- 1981 Westkunst, Rheinhallen der Kölner Messe, Koln, West Germany
- 1982 Documenta 7, Museum Fridericianum, Kassel, West Germany
- 1983 New Art at the Tate Gallery, The Tate Gallery, London, England
- 1983 Salone Internazionale Mercanti d'Arte, Palazzo Grassi, Venice, Italy
- 1984 Skulptur im 20. Jahrhundert, Basel, Switzerland
- 1984 Ouverture, Castello di Rivoli, Museo d'Arte Contemporanea, Turin, Italy
- 1985 Spuren, Skulpturen und Momente ihrer präzizen Reise, Kunsthaus Zurich, Zurich, Switzerland
- 1986 Biennale of Sydney, Sydney, Australia
- 1986 Ooghoogte - Stedelijk van Abbemuseum 1936-1986, Stedelijk van Abbemuseum, Eindhoven, The Netherlands
- 1986 La Biennale di Venezia, Venice, Italy
- 1986 Europa/Amerika - Die Geschichte einer kunstlerischen Faszination seit 1940, Museum Ludwig, Cologne, West Germany
- 1986 Skulptursein, Kunsthalle Dűsseldorf, Dűsseldorf, West Germany
- 1987 Der Unverbrauchte Blick - Kunst unserer Zeit in Berliner Sicht, Martin-Gropius-Bau, Berlin, West Germany
- 1987 Documenta 8, Museum Fridericianum, Kassel, West Germany
- 1988 Űbrigens sterben immer die Anderen: Marcel Duchamp und die Avantgarde seit 1950, Museum Ludwig, Cologne, West Germany
- 1989 Bilderstreit, Museum Ludwig, Rheinhallen der Kölner Messe, Cologne, West Germany
- 1989 Magiciens de la Terre, Centre Georges Pompidou, Musėe National d'Art Moderne, Grand Halle - La Villette, Paris, France
- 1990 Metropolis, Martin-Gropius-Bau, Berlin, Germany
- 1992 Documenta 9, Museum Fridericianum, Kassel, Germany
- 1994 Couplet 2, Stedelijk Museum, Amsterdam, the Netherlands
- 1996 Dessins: Acquisitions 1992-1996, Galerie d'art Graphique, Musėe National d'Art Moderne, Centre Georges Pompidou, Paris, France
- 1999 La Biennale di Venezia, Venice, Italy
- 2001 Beau Monde: Toward a Redeemed Cosmopolitanism, SITE Santa Fe, Santa Fe, NM
- 2001 The Museum of Our Wishes, Museum Ludwig, Cologne, Germany
- 2002 The Inward Eye: Transcendence in Contemporary Art, Contemporary Arts Museum, Houston, TX
- 2003 Louise Bourgeois, James Lee Byars - Il disparut dans le silence total, Centre Georges Pompidou, Paris, France
- 2004 Singular Forms (Sometimes Repeated): Art from 1951 to the Present, Solomon R. Guggenheim Museum, New York, NY
- 2004 Los Monocromos, Museo Nacional Centro de Arte Reina Sofia, Madrid, Spain
- 2004 The Big Nothing, Institute of Contemporary Art, Philadelphia, PA
- 2005 Colour After Klein, Barbican Art Gallery, London, England
- 2013 The Encyclopedic Palace, 55th Venice Biennale, Venice, Italy
