= Aimee Mullins =

American athlete, actress, and fashion model (born 1976)

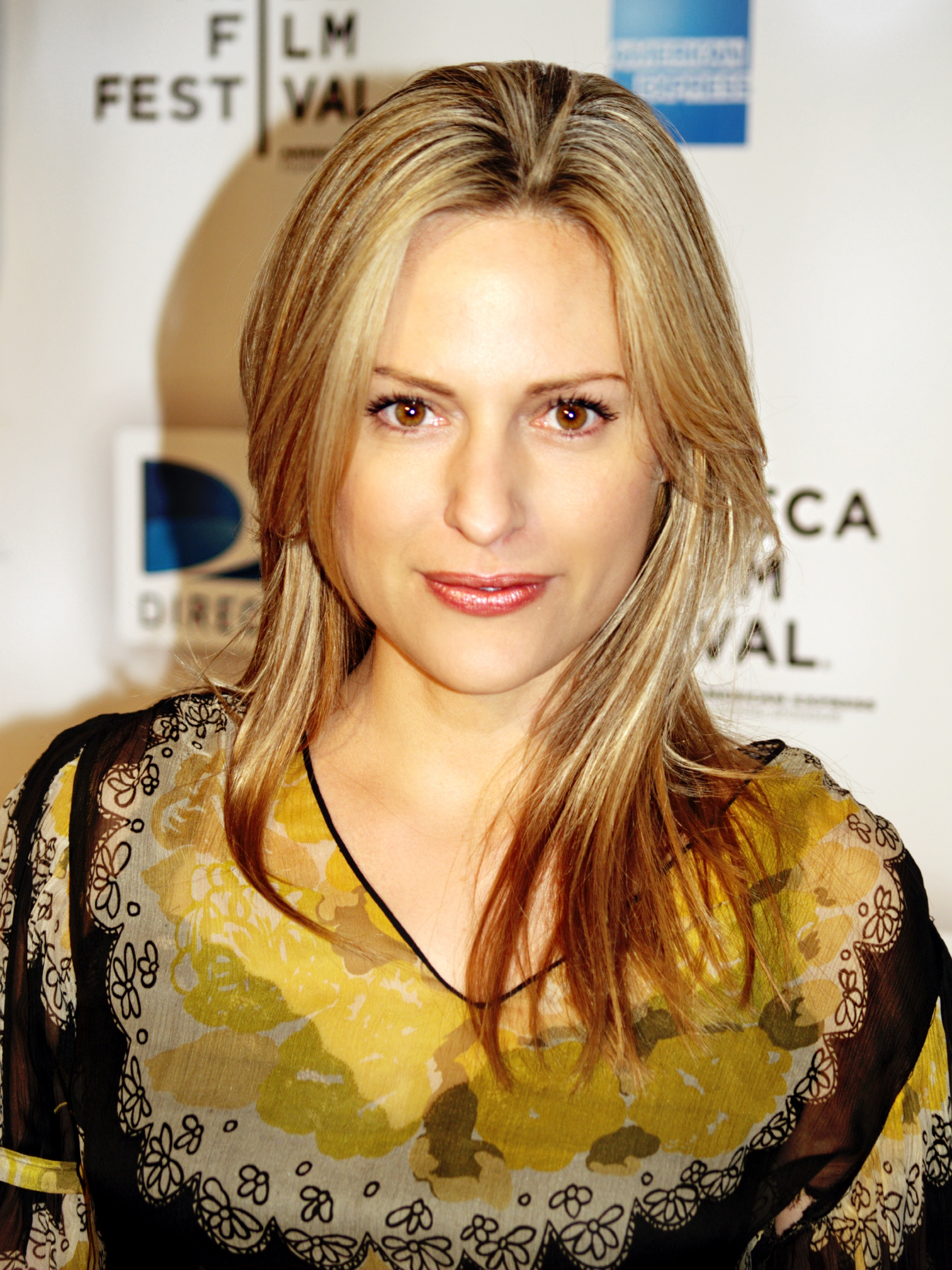
- Mullins in 2009

Personal information
- Born: July 20, 1976 (age 50) Allentown, Pennsylvania, U.S.
- Spouse: Rupert Friend (m. 2016)
- Children: 1

Sport
- Sport: Track and field
- Events: Long jump, sprinting
- College team: Georgetown University

Achievements and titles
- Paralympic finals: 1996 Paralympics

Aimee Mullins (born 1976) is an American athlete, actress, and public speaker. She was born with a medical condition that resulted in the amputation of both of her legs beneath the knee. She is the first amputee to compete against nondisabled athletes in National Collegiate Athletic Association events, and competed in the Paralympic Games in 1996 in Atlanta. In 1999, she began modeling, and, in 2002, she began an acting career. She has periodically spoken at conferences, including TED Talks.

== Early life and education ==
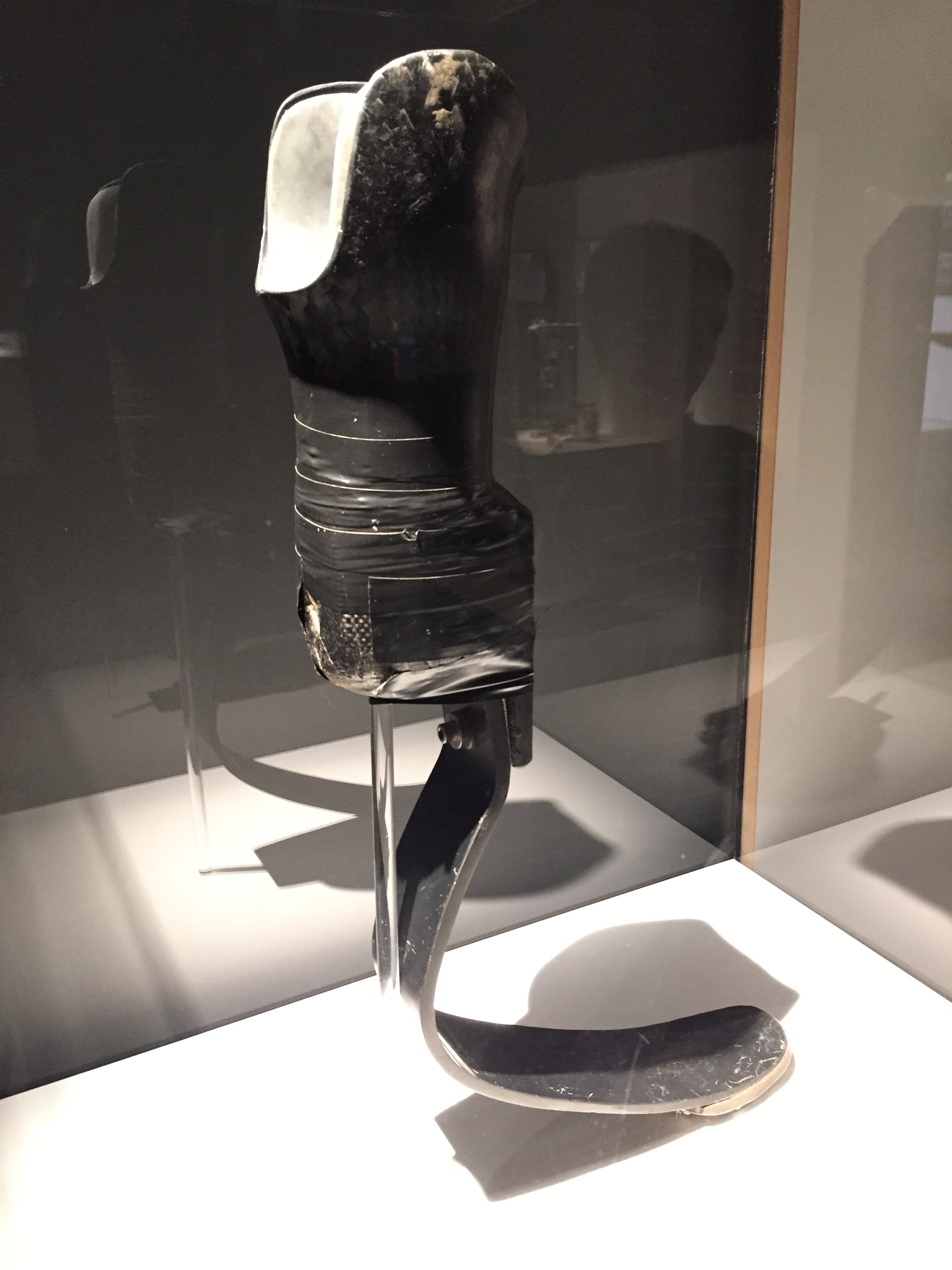
Mullins' prosthetic leg shown at CCCB exhibit in Barcelona, October 2015

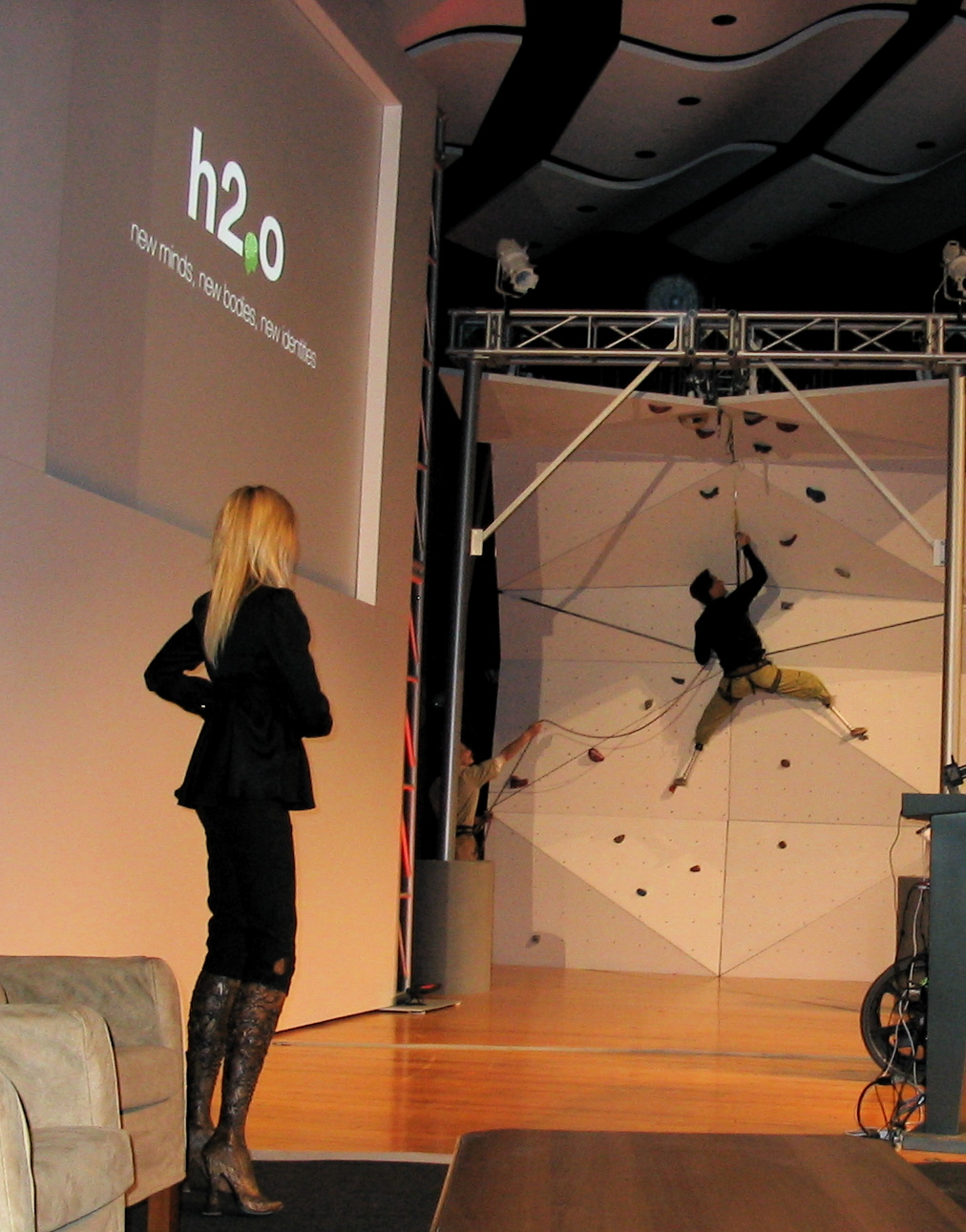
Mullins watches fellow bilateral amputee Hugh Herr climb the wall at MIT Media Lab's h2.0 symposium, May 9, 2007.

Mullins was born in 1976 in Allentown, Pennsylvania, to an Irish father Bernard Mullins from Crusheen, County Clare, Ireland and mother Bernadette Mullins. She was born with fibular hemimelia (missing fibula bones). As a result, both her legs were amputated below the knee when she was one year old. Her parents were told she would likely use a wheelchair for the rest of her life and never walk, but by the age of two she had learned to walk with prosthetic legs. She took up sports and acting at an early age.

In 1993, Mullins graduated from Parkland High School in South Whitehall Township, Pennsylvania.

She attended the Walsh School of Foreign Service at Georgetown University on a full scholarship, where she competed against nondisabled athletes in National Collegiate Athletic Association (NCAA) Division I track and field events. She is the first female amputee in history to compete in the NCAA and the first amputee in history (male or female) to compete in NCAA Division I track and field.

== Career ==
Mullins competed in the 1996 Summer Paralympics in Atlanta, where she ran the T42-46 class 100-meter sprint in 17.01 seconds and jumped 3.14 meters in the F42-46 class long jump. She retired from competitive track and field in 1998.

=== Philanthropy ===
She was elected to represent American female athletes from 2007 to 2009 as Women's Sports Foundation president; the organization was founded by sports pioneer Billie Jean King. She remains a member of both its board of trustees and its athlete advisory panel for the Women Sports Foundation. Sports Illustrated magazine named her one of the "Coolest Girls in Sports". Mullins was included as one of the "Greatest Women of the 20th Century" in the Women's Museum in Dallas prior to the museum's closure.

Along with Teresa Edwards, Mullins was appointed Chef de Mission for the United States at the 2012 Summer Olympics and 2012 Summer Paralympics in London.

In 2012, she was appointed by then-Secretary of State Hillary Clinton to the State Department's Council to Empower Women and Girls Through Sports.

=== Modeling ===
In 1999, she modelled for British fashion designer Alexander McQueen, opening his London show on a pair of hand-carved wooden prosthetic legs made from solid ash, with integral boots. She is able to change her height between 5 ft 8 in (1.73 m) and 6 ft 1 in (1.85 m) by changing her legs. She was on billboards in the U.S. as part of the "25 Years of Non-Uniform Thinking" campaign by Kenneth Cole in 2009. She was a face of L'Oréal Paris and was appointed a global L'Oréal ambassador in 2011.

=== Film and television ===
In 2002, she starred in Matthew Barney's art film Cremaster 3 as six different characters, including a cheetah woman. Her other film and television credits include roles in World Trade Center, Poirot (S9:E1 Five Little Pigs), Naked in a Fishbowl, Quid Pro Quo, and Marvelous. In the River of Fundament, she continued collaboration with Matthew Barney, starring as Isis in performances both live and filmed since 2007 and released in early 2014. She has performed roles in Young Ones, The Being Experience, Rob the Mob, and the debut feature Appropriate Behavior. She acted in Crossbones, an NBC television show, and in the Netflix series Stranger Things.

She appeared on The Colbert Report on April 15, 2010, and declared having 12 pairs of prosthetic legs, including some "in museums."

=== Speaking ===
Mullins appears periodically as a speaker on topics related to body, identity, design, and innovation. Her TED conference talks have been translated into 42 languages. She is credited as being one of the speakers that inspired Chris Anderson to purchase the TED conference from Richard Saul Wurman. She was named a TED "All-Star" in 2014.

== Personal life ==
Mullins began dating English actor Rupert Friend in 2013. They became engaged in December 2014, and were married on May 1, 2016. Their daughter was born in 2024.

== Filmography ==
=== Film ===
Year	Title	Role	Notes
2003	Cremaster 3	The Entered Novitiate	
2006	Marvelous	Becka	
2006	World Trade Center	Reporter	
2008	Quid Pro Quo	Raine	
2013	In the Woods		
2014	Rob the Mob	Carrie	
2014	Young Ones	Katherine Holm	
2014	Appropriate Behavior	Sasha	
2014	River of Fundament	The Ka of Norman / Isis	
2015	In Stereo	Trisha Bontecou	
2018	Unsane	Ashley Brighterhouse	
2019	Drunk Parents	Heidi Bianchi	
2023	Asteroid City	Actor / Student	

=== Television ===
Year	Title	Role	Notes
2002	Cremaster 3	The Entered Novitiate / Oonagh MacCumhail	
2003	Agatha Christie's Poirot	Lucy Crale	Episode: "Five Little Pigs"
2011	Naked in a Fishbowl	Nance	Episode: "The Bold and the Bucious"
2014	Crossbones	Antoinette / Woman in White / The Woman-In-White	4 episodes
2015	The Mysteries of Laura	Connie Baker	Episode: "The Mystery of the Exsanguinated Ex"
2015	Power	Ellen Wenrich	Episode: "Ghost Is Dead"
2016	Limitless	Dr. Peri	Episode: "Hi, My Name Is Rebecca Harris"
2016–2017	Stranger Things	Teresa / Terry Ives	6 episodes
2017	Odd Mom Out	Annabelle Hughes	Episode: "Homo Erectus"
2019	Bull	Alice Yarrow	Episode: "Billboard Justice"
2020	Devs	Anya	3 episodes
2020	MacGyver	Jess Miller	Episode: "Thief + Painting + Auction + Viro-486 + Justice"
2023	Extrapolations	Secretary of State Garrett	Episode: "2059: Face Of God"

== Awards ==
In 2017, she was inducted into the National Women's Hall of Fame.

On May 4, 2018, she received an honorary degree and gave the commencement address at Northeastern University in Boston, Massachusetts.
