= List of awards and nominations received by Maggie Gyllenhaal =

Maggie Gyllenhaal awards and nominations
- Gyllenhaal in 2021
Awards and nominations
Award	Wins	Nominations
Academy Awards	0	2
Actor Awards	0	1
BAFTA Awards	0	1
Critics' Choice Awards	0	3
Emmy Awards	0	1
Golden Globe Awards	1	5

Totals (Note: Certain award groups do not simply award one winner. They acknowledge several different recipients, have runners-up, and have third place. Since this is a specific recognition and is different from losing an award, runner-up mentions are considered wins in this award tally. For simplification and to avoid errors, each award in this list has been presumed to have had a prior nomination.)
- Wins: 17
- Nominations: 73

This article is a List of awards and nominations received by Maggie Gyllenhaal

Maggie Gyllenhaal is an American actress, director, screenwriter, and producer. She is known for her work in film, television and theater. She has received a Golden Globe Award, a Directors Guild of America Award and a prize from the Venice Film Festival as well as nominations for an Academy Award, an Actor Award, a BAFTA Award, three Critics' Choice Awards, and a Primetime Emmy Award.

Gyllenhaal took a leading role in the erotic romance Secretary (2002) for which she was nominated for the Golden Globe Award for Best Actress in a Motion Picture – Musical or Comedy and the Independent Spirit Award for Best Female Lead. She played a gold-digger in the comedy-drama Happy-Endings (2005) earning an Independent Spirit Award for Best Supporting Female nomination. She played a recovering heroin addict in the drama Sherrybaby (2006) earning a Golden Globe Award for Best Actress in a Motion Picture – Drama nomination. She played Rachel Dawes in the Christopher Nolan directed film The Dark Knight (2008) for which she was nominated for the Critics' Choice Movie Award for Best Acting Ensemble. For her role as a single mother in the drama Crazy Heart (2009) she was nominated for the Academy Award for Best Supporting Actress.

She made her directorial film debut with The Lost Daughter (2021) which premiered at the 78th Venice International Film Festival where she won the Golden Osella. The film later earned her the Directors Guild of America Award for Outstanding Directing – First-Time Feature Film and three Independent Spirit Awards as well as nominations for the Academy Award for Best Adapted Screenplay, the BAFTA Award for Best Adapted Screenplay, the Critics' Choice Movie Award for Best Adapted Screenplay and the Golden Globe Award for Best Director.

On television, she played a Jewish businesswoman in the BBC Two political spy miniseries The Honourable Woman (2014) for which she won the Golden Globe Award for Best Actress – Miniseries or Television Film as well as nominations for the Actor Award for Outstanding Performance by a Female Actor in a Miniseries or Television Movie, the Critics' Choice Television Award for Best Actress in a Movie/Miniseries and the Primetime Emmy Award for Outstanding Lead Actress in a Limited or Anthology Series or Movie. She also played a prostitute in the HBO drama series THe Deuce (2017–2019) earning a Golden Globe Award for Best Actress – Television Series Drama nomination.

== Major associations ==
=== Academy Awards ===
Year	Category	Nominated work	Result	Ref.
2009	Best Supporting Actress	Crazy Heart	Nominated	
2021	Best Adapted Screenplay	The Lost Daughter	Nominated	

=== Actor Awards ===
Year	Category	Nominated work	Result	Ref.
2014	Outstanding Actress in a Miniseries or Television Movie	The Honourable Woman	Nominated	

=== BAFTA Awards ===
Year	Category	Nominated work	Result	Ref.
British Academy Film Awards
2021	Best Adapted Screenplay	The Lost Daughter	Nominated	

=== Critics' Choice Awards ===
Year	Category	Nominated work	Result	Ref.
Critics' Choice Movie Awards
2008	Best Acting Ensemble	The Dark Knight	Nominated	
2021	Best Adapted Screenplay	The Lost Daughter	Nominated	
Critics' Choice Television Awards
2015	Best Actress in a Movie/Miniseries	The Honourable Woman	Nominated	

=== Emmy Awards ===
Year	Category	Nominated work	Result	Ref.
Primetime Emmy Awards
2015	Outstanding Lead Actress in a Miniseries or Movie	The Honourable Woman	Nominated	

=== Golden Globe Awards ===
Year	Category	Nominated work	Result	Ref.
2002	Best Actress in a Motion Picture – Comedy or Musical	Secretary	Nominated	
2006	Best Actress in a Motion Picture – Drama	Sherrybaby	Nominated	
2015	Best Actress – Miniseries or Television Film	The Honourable Woman	Won	
2018	Best Actress – Television Series Drama	The Deuce	Nominated	
2021	Best Director – Motion Picture	The Lost Daughter	Nominated	

== Miscellaneous awards ==
Year	Award / Organization	Category	Nominated work	Result	Ref.
2003	Boston Society of Film Critics	Best Actress	Secretary	Won	
2003	Empire Awards	Best Actress	Secretary	Nominated	
2003	Independent Spirit Awards	Best Female Lead	Secretary	Nominated	
2003	MTV Movie Awards	Best Breakthrough Performance	Secretary	Nominated	
2003	National Board of Review	Best Breakthrough Performance	Secretary	Won	
2003	National Society of Film Critics	Best Actress	Secretary	Nominated	
2003	Online Film Critics Society	Best Breakthrough Performance	Secretary	Won	
2003	Online Film Critics Society	Best Actress	Secretary	Nominated	
2003	Chicago Film Critics Association	Most Promising Performer	Secretary	Won	
2003	Satellite Awards	Best Actress – Motion Picture Musical or Comedy	Secretary	Nominated	
2003	Toronto Film Critics Association	Best Actress	Secretary	Nominated	
2003	Vancouver Film Critics Circle	Best Actress	Secretary	Nominated	
2003	Washington D.C. Area Film Critics Association	Best Actress	Secretary	Nominated	
2005	Independent Spirit Awards	Best Supporting Female	Happy Endings	Nominated	
2006	Chicago Film Critics Association	Best Actress	Sherrybaby	Nominated	
2006	London Film Critics' Circle	Actress of the Year	Sherrybaby	Nominated	
2006	Satellite Awards	Best Actress – Motion Picture	Sherrybaby	Nominated	
2006	Saturn Awards	Best Actress	Stranger than Fiction	Nominated	
2007	Annie Awards	Outstanding Voice Acting in a Feature Production	Monster House	Nominated	
2008	Saturn Awards	Best Actress	The Dark Knight	Nominated	
2009	Dallas–Fort Worth Film Critics Association	Best Supporting Actress	Crazy Heart	Nominated	
2014	British Independent Film Awards	Best Supporting Actress	Frank	Nominated	
2014	Satellite Awards	Best Actress – Miniseries or Television Film	The Honourable Woman	Nominated	
2021	Venice Film Festival	Best Screenplay	The Lost Daughter	Won	
2021	SCAD Savannah Film Festival	Rising Star Director Award	The Lost Daughter	Won	
2021	Gotham Awards	Best Feature	The Lost Daughter	Won	
2021	Gotham Awards	Breakthrough Director	The Lost Daughter	Won	
2021	Gotham Awards	Best Screenplay	The Lost Daughter	Won	
2021	New York Film Critics Circle	Best First Film	The Lost Daughter	Won	
2021	Boston Society of Film Critics	Best New Filmmaker	The Lost Daughter	Won	
2021	Chicago Film Critics Association	Best Adapted Screenplay	The Lost Daughter	Nominated	
2021	Chicago Film Critics Association	Breakthrough Filmmaker	The Lost Daughter	Nominated	
2021	Florida Film Critics Circle	Best First Film	The Lost Daughter	Nominated	
2022	San Diego Film Critics Society	Best Director	The Lost Daughter	Nominated	
2022	San Francisco Bay Area Film Critics Circle	Best Director	The Lost Daughter	Nominated	
2022	San Francisco Bay Area Film Critics Circle	Best Adapted Screenplay	The Lost Daughter	Nominated	
2022	Austin Film Critics Association	Best First Film	The Lost Daughter	Nominated	
2022	Toronto Film Critics Association	Best First Feature	The Lost Daughter	Won	
2022	Online Film Critics Society	Best Adapted Screenplay	The Lost Daughter	Nominated	
2022	Online Film Critics Society	Best Debut Feature	The Lost Daughter	Won	
2022	Alliance of Women Film Journalists	Best Film	The Lost Daughter	Nominated	
2022	Alliance of Women Film Journalists	Best Director	The Lost Daughter	Nominated	
2022	Alliance of Women Film Journalists	Best Adapted Screenplay	The Lost Daughter	Nominated	
2022	Alliance of Women Film Journalists	Best Woman Director	The Lost Daughter	Nominated	
2022	Alliance of Women Film Journalists	Best Woman Screenwriter	The Lost Daughter	Nominated	
2022	International Cinephile Society	Best Debut Feature	The Lost Daughter	Nominated	
2022	London Film Critics Circle	Film of the Year	The Lost Daughter	Nominated	
2022	London Film Critics Circle	Screenwriter of the Year	The Lost Daughter	Nominated	
2022	USC Scripter Awards		The Lost Daughter	Won	
2022	Hollywood Critics Association	Best Adapted Screenplay	The Lost Daughter	Nominated	
2022	Hollywood Critics Association	Best First Feature	The Lost Daughter	Nominated	
2022	Independent Spirit Awards	Best Feature	The Lost Daughter	Won	
2022	Independent Spirit Awards	Best Director	The Lost Daughter	Won	
2022	Independent Spirit Awards	Best Screenplay	The Lost Daughter	Won	
2022	Vancouver Film Critics Circle	Best Screenplay	The Lost Daughter	Nominated	
2022	Directors Guild of America Awards	Outstanding Directing – First-Time Feature Film	The Lost Daughter	Won	
2022	Satellite Awards	Best Motion Picture – Drama	The Lost Daughter	Nominated	
2022	Satellite Awards	Best Adapted Screenplay	The Lost Daughter	Nominated	
