= River of Fundament =

- Film poster
- Directed by: Matthew Barney; Jonathan Bepler
- Written by: Matthew Barney
- Based on: Ancient Evenings by Norman Mailer
- Produced by: Matthew Barney; Laurenz Foundation
- Starring: Dave Bald Eagle; Milford Graves; John Buffalo Mailer; Ellen Burstyn; Maggie Gyllenhaal; Madyn Greer Coakley; Paul Giamatti; Matthew Barney; Aimee Mullins; Shara Nova; Joan La Barbara; Elaine Stritch; Debbie Harry
- Cinematography: Peter Streitmann
- Edited by: Katie Mcquerrey
- Music by: Jonathan Bepler
- Production company: Laurenz Foundation
- Release date: February 12, 2014
- Running time: 330 minutes
- Country: United States
- Language: English

River of Fundament is a 2014 American operatic experimental film written and directed by American contemporary artist and filmmaker Matthew Barney, and co-directed by longtime collaborator Jonathan Bepler. It was produced by Barney and the Laurenz Foundation, and is loosely based on American author Norman Mailer's 1983 novel Ancient Evenings. The film features Barney, Dave Bald Eagle, Milford Graves, John Buffalo Mailer, Ellen Burstyn, Maggie Gyllenhaal, Madyn Greer Coakley, Paul Giamatti, Shara Nova, Joan La Barbara, Elaine Stritch, Debbie Harry and Aimee Mullins.

== Background ==
River of Fundament was produced over 2007 to 2012, being the final product of a series of performances that accumulated into becoming the film's narrative. The film follows Norman Mailer (played by three actors over the course of the film) as he travels through three reincarnations, enduring the seven mythological states of his soul, loosely based on his own novel, Ancient Evenings (1983). Along with the main narrative, it includes other elements from performance, sculpture, and opera. It has been described as a "eulogy for Mailer".

The film was released on February 12, 2014, in a limited theatrical release and through exhibitions at museums in several countries.

== Narrative and cast ==
Writer Norman Mailer, becoming a protagonist of his own, reincarnates three times during and after his wake into three separate bodies, each portrayed in succession by Dave Bald Eagle, Milford Graves, and Mailer's son John Buffalo Mailer, the last failing to survive through the womb and body of his wife, Hathfertiti (a character in Ancient Evenings). With each reincarnation, he wakes up in a river of feces running beneath his Brooklyn Heights apartment, where a funeral gathering is also being hosted.

Simultaneously, Mailer's body is represented as three generations of American cars: a 1967 Chrysler Crown Imperial (referencing Barney's Cremaster 3), a 1979 Pontiac Firebird Trans Am and finally a 2001 Ford Crown Victoria Police Interceptor. All three cars are transmogrified through modern industrial processing and recycling to symbolize the regeneration and reincarnation of Mailer. Through this, the narrative also incorporates American car dealerships, drum and bugle corps, "stomp teams", American performance artist James Lee Byars' piece "The Death of James Lee Byars", Los Angeles culture, the Brooklyn Navy Yard and alchemy.

Hathfertiti is variously portrayed by Ellen Burstyn, Maggie Gyllenhaal, and Madyn Greer Coakley at different stages of her life. Paul Giamatti portrays Ptahhotep (another character in Ancient Evenings). Joan La Barbara portrays Mailer's real-world widow. Elaine Stritch portrays a eulogist, while Debbie Harry portrays a singing guest at the wake. Shara Nova portrays Lieutenant Worden. Aimee Mullins and Barney portray the Egyptian Gods Isis and Osiris respectively. The pornographic actor Bobbi Starr appears as a garage manager, and Lila Downs appears as a ranchera singer.
