= Marvelous =

Marvellous (British) or Marvelous (American) may refer to:

== Film and TV ==
- Marvelous Entertainment, a Japanese media corporation
- Marvelous (film) a 2006 drama/comedy film starring Martha Plimpton
- Marvellous, a 2014 British drama television film with Toby Jones

== Music ==
- Marvelous, a 1960 album by Marv Johnson
- Marvelous (album), a 2001 Japanese album by Misia
- Marvelous, a 2022 album by American rapper Yung Gravy
- "Marvellous", a song by the Lightning Seeds from the 1994 album Jollification
- "Marvellous!", a single by The Twelfth Man from the 1992 album Still the 12th Man

== Video games ==
- Marvelous: Mōhitotsu no Takarajima, a video game by Nintendo
- Marvelous (company), a video game developer

== Other ==
- Marvellous (horse), a racehorse
