= Jonathan Bepler =

American composer

Jonathan Bepler is an American composer of experimental music perhaps best known for his collaborative work with artists and choreographers, including many years of work with visual artist Matthew Barney. He is also a multi-instrumentalist, singer, installation artist, and teacher known for his work across multiple creative disciplines.

== Early life and education ==
Bepler was born in Media, Pennsylvania. He was self-taught on many instruments by the time he finished high school. His early interests included folk dance music, ancient and world music, jazz, and improvisation. In 1993 he received and M.F.A from Bennington College in Vermont, where he studied composition with Louis Calabro, Joel Chadabe and Vivian Fine, singing with Frank Baker and Theodor Uppman as well as musical performance with Milford Graves, Bill Dixon and Min Tanaka. In the later period of his studies he directed and sang in productions of Baroque opera such as Gluck's Orfeo ed Euridice. He currently resides in Berlin.

== Career ==
From 1985 to 1996, Bepler was guitarist with the Glenn Branca Ensemble, touring with them through Europe, the United States and Asia. Starting in 1987, his first operas were composed. From 1993, Bepler also dedicated himself to sound installations, as well as to music for drama and dance. He is the composer for The Cremaster Cycle, a series of films created from 1996 to 2002 by Matthew Barney. In 1997, Bepler was baritone soloist at the world premiere of the opera Der Venusmond by Burkhard Stangl at the Empire State Building. He received a Foundation for Contemporary Arts Grants to Artists award in 1999.

In 2000, Bepler worked as a composer at the Berlin Schaubühne am Lehniner Platz with Sasha Waltz and dancers. In 2003, together with John Jasperse he created the piece California for the Festival International de Danse a Cannes. In 2006, the Ensemble Modern premiered his piece Fascia at the Schauspielhaus Frankfurt. Bepler collaborated again with Matthew Barney on the six-hour film 'River of Fundament, was created over 7 years (2006 to 2014), and premiered at the Bavarian State Opera, and at the Brooklyn Academy of Music.

He has taught as professor and artist in residence at such places as the Munich Academy of Fine Arts, Karlsruhe University of Arts and Design, and the University of Arts and Design Offenbach.

== Installations ==
- Automation of Accidental Gestures, sound and sculpture installation with Sue Rees (with guest performers including Fred Lomberg-Holm, Jennifer Monson, Tom Goralnik, and Dan Froot) in New York and Miami, 1992–95
- Source to Sound, sound installation, 1993
- On Balance, multi-channel audio installation. MoMA PS1, New York, 2000
- The Order, Performance installation for the Cremaster cycle exhibition at the Solomon R. Guggenheim Museum, 2003
- Double quartet for: together again for the first time, video and sound installation. New York, 2005
- Dances for Broken Ensemble, video and sound installation. Cincinnati Contemporary Arts Center, 2007
- Curtain Callers, video and sound installation with Ann-Sofi Siden. Royal Dramatic Theater, Stockholm 2012

== Compositions ==
- Innana, dance-opera (with Christina Svane), 1987
- The Great Belzoni, cabaret-opera, 1990
- Keep Your Hands Off, chamber music for piano, saxophone, cello, bass, guitar and drums, 1997
- Primary Orifice for the Glenn Branca Ensemble, 1998
- Cremaster 5, Budapest Philharmonic, Adrienne Csengery, soprano in film by Matthew Barney. Budapest, 1993
- Ruins, video opera project. Tokyo, 1999
- Cremaster 2, Music for film by Matthew Barney. Utah and NY, 1999
- S, music for the dance drama by Sasha Waltz. Berlin, 2000
- Cremaster 3, Music for film by Matthew Barney. New York, 2002
- Transient Symphony: Oratorio for Hillside and Valley, mobile sound track for the Echigo-Tsumari Art Trienniale. Japan, 2003
- The Rape of the Sabine Women, video opera project with Eve Sussman. Greece and New York, 2005
- Gezeiten, music for the dance drama by Sasha Waltz. Berlin, 2005
- Fascia, concert piece for orchestra, children's choir, opera soloists and foley artists. Ensemble Modern. Frankfurt, 2006
- Aliens, score for Dance by Luc Dunberry. Grand Theatre Luxembourg, 2008
- Les Assistantes, collaboration with choreographer Jennifer Lacey. Paris and Montpellier, 2008
- REN Los Angeles, Drum and Bugle Corps, Choir, Mariachi Divas featuring Lila Downs. Site specific performance by Matthew Barney and Jonathan Bepler. Los Angeles, 2008
- Jimmy, concert piece for Guitar, Trombone, Viola, Accordion, 2009
- Same Unknown, sound score for 9 channel video installation by Ann-Sofi Siden. 2009
- Guardian of the Veil, chamber orchestra, marching snares, baglamas, suonas, featuring the Basel Sinfonietta. Theater Basel, 2009
- KHU Detroit, operatic multi-site Performance in collaboration with Matthew Barney. Detroit, 2010
- Tool is Loot, Trombones, strings, woodwinds, percussion, singer (Bepler). score for Dance with Jennifer Lacey and Wally Cardona. The Kitchen, NYC. 2011
- BA New York, 300 voices, Banjo ensemble, String ensemble. performance in collaboration with Matthew Barney. Brooklyn Navy Yard Dry docks, 2013
- Divided Chamber Music, for strings, brass, choirs and bodies. Zeche Zollverein, Essen, Germany, 2014
- Within Between, live score for dance by John Jasperse. 6 channel sound. NYLA, NYC, 2014
- River of Fundament, 6-hour work with many musical ensembles. Operatic film by Matthew Barney and Jonathan Bepler. Munich and NYC, 2014
- Ca Va Bien, Mayakovsky, 5 movements for orchestra and vocal soloists. Orchestra and Choir of Radio France, Paris, 2017
- Redoubt, score for film by Matthew Barney, 2018

== Discography ==
- Masterpieces of Fantasy, 1997
- Music for Cremaster 5, Original Soundtrack Recording, 1998
- Alternative Schubertiade (Anthology), 1999
- Music for Cremaster 2, 1999
- State of the Union (Anthology), 2001
- The Order, 2002
- Music for Cremaster 3, 2002
- Transient Symphony, 2003
