= Won't Back Down (film) =

2012 American film

- Theatrical poster
- Directed by: Daniel Barnz
- Written by: Brin Hill; Daniel Barnz
- Produced by: Mark Johnson
- Starring: Maggie Gyllenhaal; Viola Davis; Oscar Isaac; Rosie Perez; Holly Hunter
- Cinematography: Roman Osin
- Edited by: Kristina Boden
- Music by: Marcelo Zarvos
- Production companies: Walden Media; Gran Via Productions
- Distributed by: 20th Century Fox
- Release date: September 28, 2012
- Running time: 121 minutes
- Country: United States
- Language: English
- Budget: $19 million
- Box office: $5.8 million

Won't Back Down is a 2012 American drama film directed by Daniel Barnz and starring Maggie Gyllenhaal, Viola Davis and Holly Hunter.

== Premise ==
Two determined mothers, a car dealer/bartender (Maggie Gyllenhaal) and a teacher (Viola Davis), look to transform their children's failing inner-city school in Pittsburgh. Facing a powerful and entrenched bureaucracy and corruption from the teachers' union president (Holly Hunter) and the school's principal (Bill Nunn), they risk everything to make a difference in the education and future of their children.

== Cast ==
- Maggie Gyllenhaal as Jamie Fitzpatrick
- Viola Davis as Nona Alberts
- Holly Hunter as Evelyn Riske
- Oscar Isaac as Michael Perry
- Rosie Perez as Brenna Harper
- Ving Rhames as Principal Thompson
- Lance Reddick as Charles Alberts
- Marianne Jean-Baptiste as Olivia Lopez
- Bill Nunn as Principal Holland
- Emily Alyn Lind as Malia Fitzpatrick
- Dante Brown as Cody Alberts
- Liza Colón-Zayas as Yvonne
- Ned Eisenberg as Arthur Gould
- Nancy Bach as Deborah
- Keith Flippen as Ren
- Robert Haley as Tim
- Sarab Kamoo as Principal Chamudes
- Joe Coyle as Clay Bathgate
- Jennifer Massey as Valerie Bathgate
- Jane Mowder as Jan
- Reavis Graham as Hank Hart
- Anthony Marino Jr. as Tyler
- Richard Barlow as Mr. Brandt
- Rebecca Harris as Ms. Southwick
- Kevin Jiggetts as Mr. Mannis
- Patricia Cray as Ms. Schwartz
- Juan Veza as Mr. Parrish
- Franklin Djeda Smith as Mr. King

== Production ==
=== Background ===
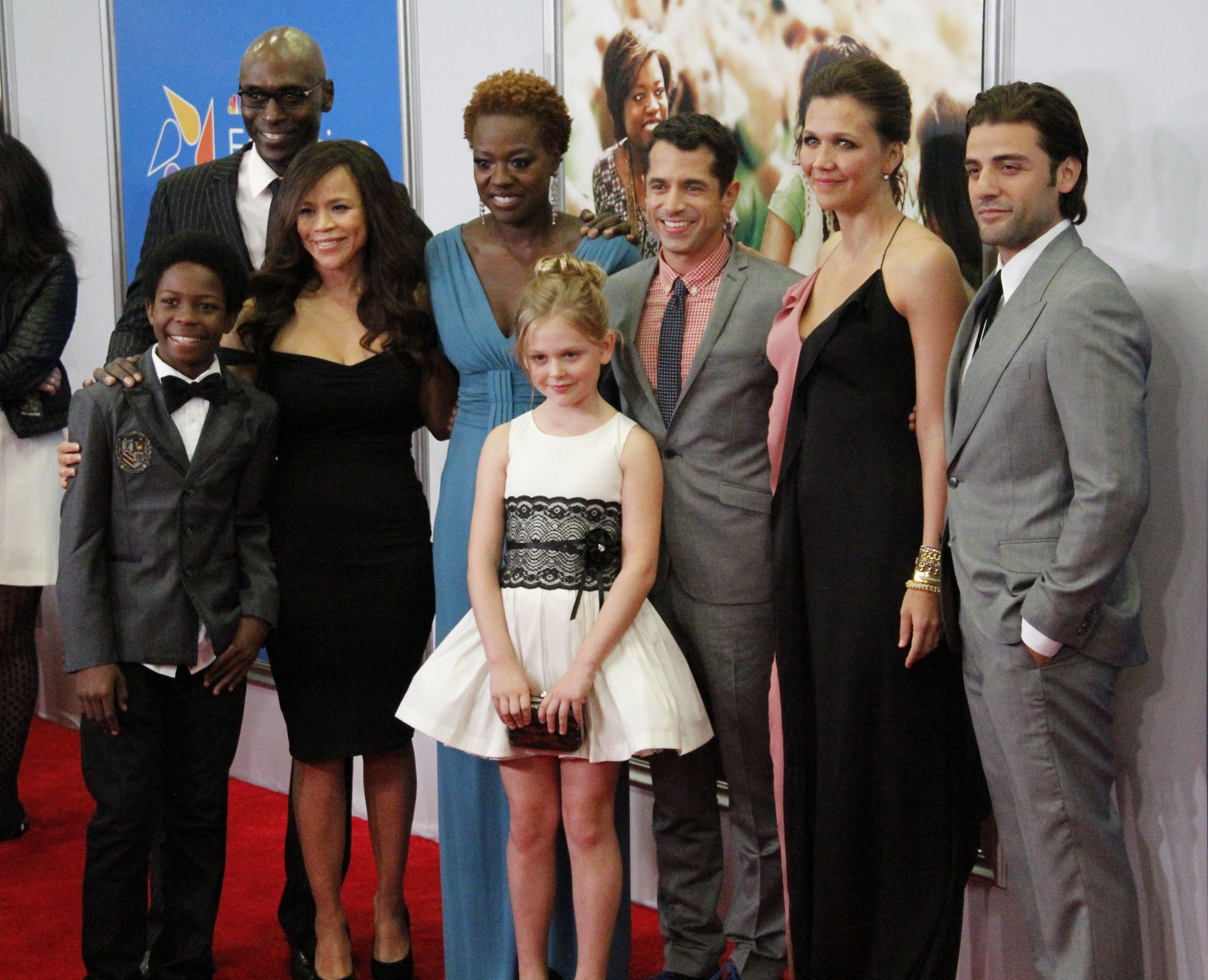
The cast of the movie premiere in New York.

The film is loosely based on the events surrounding the use of the parent trigger law in Sunland-Tujunga, Los Angeles, California in 2010, where several groups of parents attempted to take over several failing public schools. The Parent Trigger law, which was passed in California and other states in 2010, allowed parents to enforce administrative overhaul and overrule administrators in under-performing public schools if petitioned. If successful, petitions allow parents to direct changes such as dismissal of staff and potential conversion of a school to a charter school.

=== Release ===
Walden Media, a film studio which released a 2010 documentary film Waiting for "Superman" with Paramount Pictures and Participant Media about the American educational system, produced the film, with 20th Century Fox releasing it on September 28, 2012. American actresses Maggie Gyllenhaal and Viola Davis were among the first to be cast, with Academy award-winning actress Holly Hunter being cast later on. The film marked Hunter's first film appearance in seven years since The Incredibles and The Big White. The film's trailer was released on May 17, 2012. The film's budget was $25 million, not counting the undisclosed amount for marketing the film.

=== Promotional campaign ===
Private foundations and the U.S. Chamber of Commerce contributed more than $2 million for a publicity campaign for the film. Television ads, bookmarks, websites and private screenings a six-month cross-country tour promoted the film. Promoters scheduled private screenings in states from New York to Georgia and Utah, to promote the movie and its parent trigger message. Michelle Rhee presented the film at separate events near both the Republican and Democratic Party 2012 national conventions several weeks before its theatrical release.

== Reception ==
=== Box office ===
The film grossed just $5.3 million at the box office domestically, and, according to Box Office Mojo, had the worst opening-weekend performance of any film to open in more than 2,500 theatres – collecting just $1,035 per screen, until the record was broken by Victor Frankenstein in 2015.

=== Critical response ===
On Rotten Tomatoes, the film has an approval rating of 34% based on 105 reviews with an average rating of 5.10/10. The site's critical consensus reads: "Despite the best efforts of its talented leads, Won't Back Down fails to lend sufficient dramatic heft or sophistication to the hot-button issue of education reform." On Metacritic the film has a weighted average score of 42% based on reviews from 34 critics, indicating "mixed or average reviews". Audiences surveyed by CinemaScore gave the film a grade "A−" on scale of A to F.

Variety called the film a "heavy-handed inspirational drama" that "grossly oversimplifies the issue at hand." The site continued, "Barnz's disingenuous pot-stirrer plays to audiences' emotions rather than their intelligence, offering meaty roles for Maggie Gyllenhaal as a determined single mom, and Viola Davis as the good egg among a rotten batch of teachers, while reducing everyone else to cardboard characterizations. Absent high-profile champions, femme-centric pic could suffer from low attendance." Roger Ebert of the Chicago Sun-Times rated the film 2 out of 4 stars, writing: "Both the lottery scene and the anti-union material seem to be fictionalized versions of material in the powerful documentary Waiting for Superman which covered similar material with infinitely greater depth." Michael Medved liked the film, giving it three and a half stars (out of four) and calling it "... one of the better films of 2012."

== Accolades ==
Viola Davis won the NAACP Image Award for Outstanding Actress in a Motion Picture for her role as Nona Alberts; and she was nominated for a Black Reel Award for Best Actress for her role.

== See also ==
- Education in the United States
- Waiting for "Superman"
- The Lottery

== Home media ==
Won't Back Down was released on DVD and Blu-ray on January 15, 2013.
