= Dave Bald Eagle =

Lakota chief and actor (1919–2016)

David Bald Eagle
- Waniyetu Opi
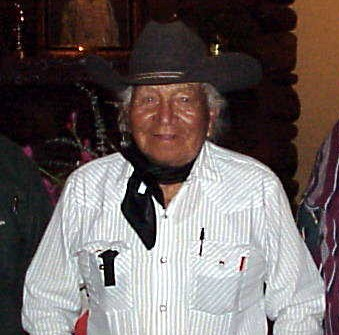
- A photo of David Bald Eagle in 2003 By Phil Konstantin

Lakota leader
- In office 1996–2016

First Chief of the United Indigenous Nations of The Americas

Personal details
- Born: David William Beautiful Bald Eagle; April 8, 1919 Cheyenne River Indian Reservation, South Dakota
- Died: July 22, 2016 (aged 97) Cheyenne River Indian Reservation, South Dakota
- Resting place: Black Hills National Cemetery
- Spouses: Penny Rathburn; Josée Kesteman
- Relations: White Bull (grandfather); White Feather (grandfather)
- Mother tongue: Lakota
- Military career
- Allegiance: United States
- Branch: United States Army
- Service years: 1936–1944
- Rank: Sergeant
- Units: 4th Cavalry (1936–1941); 82nd Airborne (1941–1944)
- Conflicts: World War II: Battle of Anzio; Normandy Beach
- Awards: Silver Star medal (Anzio); Purple Heart medal

David William Bald Eagle (April 8, 1919 – July 22, 2016), also known as Chief David Beautiful Bald Eagle, was a Lakota actor, soldier, stuntman, and musician. He is perhaps best known for his appearance in the film Dances with Wolves (1990), which won the Academy Award for Best Picture.

== Life and work ==
Dave Bald Eagle was born in a tipi on the west banks of Cherry Creek, on the Cheyenne River Sioux Tribe Reservation in South Dakota.

Bald Eagle first enlisted in the Fourth Cavalry of the United States Army and served out his enlistment. During World War II, he re-enlisted in the 82nd Airborne Division ("All American Division") where he fought in the Battle of Anzio, being awarded a Silver Star, and in the D-Day invasion of Normandy at which time he received a Purple Heart Medal when he was wounded.

After the Second World War, Bald Eagle worked in a number of occupations including drummer, race car driver, semi-pro baseball player, and rodeo performer before beginning a career in Hollywood films. He was the grandson of famous Lakota warrior White Bull.

== Selected filmography ==
- Dances with Wolves (1990) as technical advisor and extra
- Lakota Woman: Siege at Wounded Knee (1994) as Old man at HQ
- Skins (2002) as Old Soldier
- Into the West (2005) episode "Wheel to the Stars" as Two Arrows
- Imprint (2007) as Medicine Man
- Rich Hall's Inventing the Indian (2012) (TV Movie documentary) as himself
- River of Fundament (2014) as Norman III
- Neither Wolf Nor Dog (2016) as Dan
