= Parent trigger =

Law for changing school administration

A parent trigger is a legal maneuver through which parents can change the administration of a poorly performing public school—most notably by transforming it into a charter school.

The first parent trigger law was passed by the California legislature in January 2010. Subsequently, similar laws were considered in at least 25 states in the US, while they have been adopted by six states: Louisiana, Mississippi, Connecticut, Texas, Indiana and Ohio. The law has been invoked by parents in the Compton, Adelanto, Anaheim, and LAUSD school districts of California.

In California, parents of children enrolled in 20th Street Elementary School and Palm Lane Elementary School attempted to use the parent trigger law. After the parent trigger campaign, the 20th Street Elementary School was one of the most improved schools in all of LAUSD. Former Los Angeles Mayor Antonio Villaraigosa wrote about the success of the 20th Street parent trigger in the Wall Street Journal.

== History ==
Parent trigger laws were first introduced by the Los Angeles Parents Union (LAPU), founded in 2006 by Green Dot Public Schools, a charter school organization. Green Dot, led by Steve Barr, also conducted campaigns in Watts—using a pre-existing law for school transformation based on petitions from teachers—to transform public schools into charter schools.

In May 2009, Green Dot formed Parent Revolution, led by Ben Austin who was a former Clinton White House Staffer and Los Angeles Deputy Mayor. Austin formulated the idea for the parent trigger law and worked with Parent Revolutions staffer Shirley Ford to lobby for its passage. The laws envisioned would allow 51% of parents to form a Parent Union with control over their school and the ability to transform it using one of President Obama's four school turnaround options. Speaking at a meeting organized by Green Dot, LA mayor Antonio Villaraigosa expressed support for the proposed laws, arguing that if teachers can have a union parents should also be able to organize and unionize. United Teachers Los Angeles (UTLA) criticized Green Dot and the mayor for attempted union busting, and the state teachers union president referred to parent trigger as a "Lynch mob" provision.

In November 2009, the Los Angeles Unified School District passed parent trigger rules stating that a majority of parents or future parents could transfer a school to outside management. The decision won praise from Parents Revolution and criticism from UTLA. However, some charter operators objected to rules that required charter schools to include neighborhood students and to employ custodial services from the district. Parent Revolution, Mayor Villaraigosa, and others urged the state to pass similar laws.

In January 2010, the California legislature passed by one vote in both houses a "Parent Empowerment" law (Article 3 of SBX54, introduced by Senator Gloria J. Romero and Senator Bob Huff and signed by Governor Arnold Schwarzenegger), becoming the first state in the nation with a parent trigger law. The law's passage, just before a federal deadline on January 19, allowed California to compete for $700 million in President Obama's Race to the Top initiative (which it did not ultimately receive) by complying with a Race to the Top requirement that test scores be used to evaluate teachers. SBX54 also includes an "open enrollment" provision, allowing students in underperforming schools to apply for admission at any other school.

After the law's passage, Parent Revolution—with a $1 million annual budget funded by the Gates Foundation, the Walton Family Foundation, the Wasserman Foundation, the Broad Foundation, and the Hewlett Foundation—announced intentions to seek parent trigger actions across California.

In 2012, the film Won't Back Down was released and shown at the 2012 Democratic National Convention. The film is a fictionalized account of the passage of the parent trigger law in L.A., and was shown at the DNC by Democrats for Education Reform, a pro-charter school political action committee.

Similar parent trigger laws have been proposed in more than 20 states, and been enacted in Mississippi, Texas, Indiana, and Louisiana. A variation on the law, which uses parents' councils, was passed in Connecticut. Ohio has established a pilot version of the law which applies only to the Columbus City Schools.

Public advocates for parent trigger laws, besides Parent Revolution, include The US Conference of Mayors, Stand for Children, and Michelle Rhee. The New York Times reported in 2010 that Education Secretary Arne Duncan and Chicago Mayor Rahm Emanuel support parent trigger laws. Mitt Romney supports it.

== Provisions ==
California's trigger law applies to schools with an Academic Performance Index score of below 800. Parents of children attending these schools may petition for one or more of four options:

- Convert the school into a charter
- Replace the old staff and make budget decisions
- Dismiss the principal
- Dissolve the school and relocate the students to other schools.

If at least half of the school's parents sign a petition, the school district must implement the policy they choose. The aggregate group of parents whose children are likely to attend a school in the future have, independently, the same power.

== Implementation ==
As of May 2013, at least three school districts have been petitioned to implement a trigger: Compton Unified School District, Adelanto School District, and the Los Angeles Unified School District.

=== McKinley Elementary School, Compton, California ===
In Compton, Parent Revolution collected parent signatures to transfer administration of McKinley Elementary School to Celerity Education Group, a charter operator. Paid staffers were joined by 15 parent volunteers who formed a group called McKinley Parents for Change. The drive yielded signatures representing 61% of McKinley families.

Compton Unified School District, along with some unsatisfied parents, challenged the petition, arguing that Parent Revolution had given parents no choice in how to change the school (deciding beforehand on a charter school managed by Celerity) and questioning the validity of the signatures produced by the group. Parents criticized Parents Revolution, McKinley Elementary, and teachers for harassing them and pushing their own agendas during the conflict. Between 50 and 60 parents revoked their signatures after discovering what the petition was for, stating that Parent Revolution had misled them about its effects. Even though the parent trigger law allowed undocumented parents to sign the petition, the school district demanded photographic identification to back up the parent signatures on the petition; Parent Revolution sued claiming Compton was attempting to intimidate undocumented parents and won an injunction preventing them from requiring official identification to verify a parent trigger petition.

Ultimately, the parent trigger at McKinley was not enacted. Celerity opened a charter school at the Church of the Redeemer two blocks away. Predictions that the new charter school would undermine McKinley were disproven when most of the new school's students came from elsewhere.

=== Desert Trails Elementary, Adelanto, California ===
Parent Revolution's second attempt at a parent trigger occurred in Adelanto, California, at Desert Trails Elementary, then of the Adelanto Elementary School District. With the assistance of twelve parent volunteers, the group collected signatures for a petition to transform their failing school, Desert Trails Elementary. Similar disputes arose, with blame assigned to both sides—the core issue being the validity of the signatures on the petition. These signatures represented 70% of the school's 666 students.

However, support for the parent trigger action dropped below the required 50% when the district claimed that 90 parents rescinded their signatures. The Adelanto school board initially rejected the petition, calling too many of the signatures invalid.

In July 2012, California Superior Court Judge Steve Malone's decision overruled the board in favor of the petition, stating that the state law did not allow parents to revoke their signatures. The school board rejected this plan also, saying there was not time to create a new school before September 2012, and instead creating an advisory committee called the Alternative Governance Board. This body would consist of three parents, three teachers, two representatives of the superintendent, and a community member. According to many, this action constituted open defiance of the court's decision.

The parents challenged the decision again in court, raising the legal question of whether the law gives the school or the parents the final authority over implementing reforms. As litigation continued into the 2012 school year, the pro-trigger parents (who formed a group called the Desert Trails Parents Union) had solicited proposals for new schools from several charter operators. In July 2013, the courts ordered Desert Trails Elementary School to be replaced with Desert Trails Preparatory Academy, operated by the same Charter School administration that runs the LaVerne Preparatory Academy in Hesperia, California.

Adelanto Elementary School District continued to maintain some control over the school, as the courts ordered a provisional charter agreement at the school's beginning due to the Parent Trigger Law. In December 2015, AESD revoked the school's charter for failing to address the concerns that the Board of Trustees had for the campus. DTPA denied the allegations and responded to the decision that the District is making retaliatory inquiries and accusations that have nothing to do with student progress.

In March 2016 the San Bernardino County Board of Education voted to hand authority over the charter school to the county government in a 3-2 vote. Although continuing litigation concerning ownership of the property is unresolved, this decision ended AESD's involvement with the campus beginning with the 2016-17 School Year.

Beau Yarbrough of the San Bernardino Sun wrote that it became "difficult to compare apples to apples between Desert Trails Elementary and how Desert Trails Prep is doing today" because around the time Desert Trails was converted, the State of California changed its standardized testing to meet the Common Core requirements.

=== West Athens Elementary School, Los Angeles, California ===
Unhappy about the school’s culture of low expectations, student safety, and low academic outputs, parents at West Athens Elementary School formed their own parent chapter and began to organize around the Parent Empowerment Act. Leveraging the law, the parents eventually suspended their parent petition process when the District agreed to hold negotiations with the parent chapter. Eventually, the parents and the LA Unified School District struck a deal to spend an additional $300,000 on personnel at the school, including hiring a full-time school psychiatrist and several aides. The agreement calls on the district to do a better job including parents in the school’s day-to-day operations, make the school safer and cleaner, create better lines of communication between teachers and parents and provide additional training for teachers and staff, all to create a school culture of high expectations for the campus.

=== Lennox Middle School, Los Angeles, California ===
Parents organized to discuss ways to improve the school for their students, and held stakeholder meetings with teachers and district leaders. Because of the threat of the Parent Empowerment Act, parents were able to transform their campus without gathering a petition. The District agreed to conduct a comprehensive needs assessment process. As a result of the needs assessment, the District implemented a turnaround plan that has community support, to include a new principal, more electives for ELL students, more freedom for teachers to teach creatively, and a strong college-going culture. Parents maintained support of the Superintendent and the school leadership and work in partnership with the school.

=== Padres Revolucionarios de Haddon ===
Parents organized because students did not feel safe, motivated or inspired at the school. Despite their efforts to solicit change before forming a parent union, they were met with resistance by the District. After obtaining a majority of parent signatures, the parents began to see progress within the school and district toward reform, which led the parent union to pause their effort and await the results of a new teacher-led effort. The parent union eventually ended their petition campaign after the teachers formally adopted a school transformation plan that allows teachers to have more control over their school and allows them to better meet the needs of their students. The parents continue to collaborate with school officials and teachers to make the reform plan a success.

=== Weigand Parents United ===
Following 15 years of low-performing academic results, and one unsuccessful effort to collaborate with teachers to gather petitions calling for key improvements for the school and for the principal to be replaced before the enactment of the Parent Empowerment Act, parents organized under the new law. The parents actively supported the teachers, but wanted to see a new leader to lead the students to academic success. The strong majority of parents successfully brought in a new principal. The parents and the community now work collaboratively with the District.

=== 24th Street Elementary ===
Parents had tried for years to organize change with the District. They eventually organized into a Parent Union and gathered signatures from 69% of parents, empowering them to solicit proposals from both District and charter applications to transform the school. The parents union negotiated a historic partnership between the district and a charter school where they would run the campus collaboratively, with the district running the K-4 program (with a reform union contract) and a charter school that was co-located on the campus operates the new 5-8 program. The parents also negotiated a new pre-K program, run by the District, as well as a presence on the principal and teacher hiring committees. A strong District-charter collaboration now shapes the school and new leadership has created a new culture.

== Criticism ==
Groups such as the Center for Teacher Quality and Fund Education Now have described the campaign for parent trigger laws as astroturfing. Other groups also focused on reforming public school education, such as the Center for Education Reform, point out that teachers' unions regularly spend substantial sums of money defeating Parental Choice, charter schools, tuition vouchers and other education reforms—and that "astroturfing" is not limited to any one side in education debates.

In the case of Parent Revolution, critics point to sponsorship by the Green Dot charter company. Related arguments have been directed at the 2012 film Won't Back Down, which promotes parent trigger laws. Won't Back Down was created by Philip Anschutz's Walden Media and supported by Walmart and the American Legislative Exchange Council (ALEC). The documentary We the Parents is a non-fiction version for comparison. Critics have echoed union claims that a primary goal of the campaign is to circumvent union protections for public school teachers.

Some parents and community leaders in Compton criticized Parent Revolution for misleading petitioners about the nature of parent trigger laws. They also cited Parent Revolution's lack of transparency and apparently top-down organization. A speech from Mayor Villaraigosa in favor of a parent trigger for McKinley Elementary triggered demonstrations, with signs reading "Our Kids Are Not for Sale" and chants of "No charter school!". Others noted that McKinley's test scores were already improving and suggested that Parent Revolution chose the school cynically in order to capture its positive results. Caroline Grannan of Parents Across America argues that the petitions have been divisive among parents in the districts where they were attempted.
