= Happy Endings (film) =

2005 film by Don Roos

- Promotional poster
- Directed by: Don Roos
- Written by: Don Roos
- Produced by: Michael Paseornek; Holly Wiersma
- Starring: Tom Arnold; Jesse Bradford; Bobby Cannavale; Steve Coogan; Laura Dern; Maggie Gyllenhaal; Lisa Kudrow; Jason Ritter
- Cinematography: Clark Mathis
- Edited by: David Codron
- Distributed by: Lions Gate Films
- Release date: July 15, 2005
- Running time: 128 minutes
- Country: United States
- Language: English
- Box office: $1.3 million

Happy Endings is a 2005 American comedy-drama film written and directed by Don Roos and starring Tom Arnold, Jesse Bradford, Bobby Cannavale, Steve Coogan, Laura Dern, Maggie Gyllenhaal, Lisa Kudrow and Jason Ritter. The film's plot uses interconnected storylines to tell three stories of Los Angeles natives that center around love and family. This plot structure led to the coining of the term "hyperlink cinema", by Alissa Quart in her review of this film for the journal Film Comment.

The expression "happy ending" is a colloquial term for offering sexual release to a client at the end of a massage.

== Plot ==
The film follows a diverse group of mostly middle-class residents of Los Angeles through emotional ups and downs in their lives, loosely connected to each other through a restaurant.

In the first story, Mamie reluctantly agrees to work with a would-be young filmmaker in order to locate the now-grown son she secretly gave up for adoption after becoming pregnant from her stepbrother Charley – who is later revealed to be gay – 19 years earlier.

In the second story, Charley and his domestic partner, Gil, are deciding whether or not to confront their friends, a lesbian couple, regarding the paternity of their son.

And in the third, a young man, Otis, is involved with a band and trying to keep his father, Frank, from learning that he is gay, while also dealing with a seemingly gold-digging woman, Jude, who inserts herself into their lives.

== Cast ==
- Lisa Kudrow as Mamie Toll
  - Hallee Hirsh as Mamie Toll (age 17)
- Steve Coogan as Charley Peppitone
  - Eric Jungmann as Charley (age 16) / Tom
- Tom Arnold as Frank McKee
- Jason Ritter as Otis McKee
- Maggie Gyllenhaal as Jude
- Bobby Cannavale as Javier Duran
- Jesse Bradford as Nicky Kunitz
- David Sutcliffe as Gil Palmer
- Laura Dern as Pam Ferris
- Sarah Clarke as Diane
- Johnny Galecki as Miles (uncredited)

== Production ==
Director Don Roos wrote the part of Mamie expressly for Lisa Kudrow after directing her in his earlier film, The Opposite of Sex, which he also wrote. Originally, the story concerned three sisters. Before Maggie Gyllenhaal was cast as the character of Jude, Gwyneth Paltrow, who had previously worked with Roos on the film Bounce, was originally slated to play the part. Gyllenhaal does her own singing in the film. Ray Liotta turned down the role of Frank McKee.

The film's narrator is separate from the film's characters, in contrast to The Opposite of Sex which is narrated from Dedee's point of view.

It took 18 months to find financial backing for the production.

== Reception ==
=== Critical response ===
Happy Endings received mixed reviews from critics. The film holds a 55% approval rating on Rotten Tomatoes, based on 108 reviews with an average rating of 5.93 out of 10. On Metacritic, it scores 57 out of 100 from 31 critics.

In a positive review, Manohla Dargis of The New York Times said "Mr. Roos has a screwball director's sense of timing and a writer's love for the well-turned phrase." Dargis added, "Ensembles this large tend to be unwieldy or overly schematic, often both, but Mr. Roos is enough of a craftsman (and a mainstream filmmaker) that he never lets the seams show."

Stephen Hunter of The Washington Post said "What's so splendid about 'Happy Endings' is the very fact that it fits into no genre whatsoever and at no time while watching it can you say, oh, probably this is going to happen. That's because 'this' never happens. Instead 'that' always happens." He also praised the ensemble cast, writing "the acting in this ensemble is of such a high order that the movie simply takes you in and makes you feel these lives as real."

Claudia Puig of USA Today wrote "The film is entertaining if contrived. It is not as cleverly structured as Roos' best ensemble comedy, The Opposite of Sex, which also co-starred [Lisa] Kudrow. But it does have humorous moments." Ruthe Stein of the San Francisco Chronicle singled out the performances of Kudrow, Bobby Cannavale, and Tom Arnold. Carina Chocano of the Los Angeles Times wrote, "'Happy Endings' lives up to its title not because Roos rigs it that way...but because he trusts [the characters will] end up exactly where they’re supposed to."

Roger Ebert wrote that while "Maggie Gyllenhaal steals the show", other "characters [are] not so engaging" and "the film's problem is that we don't much like most of the characters, or care about them". He gave the film two and a half out of four stars. Amber Wilkinson from Eye for Film gave the film three out of five stars, praising the cast and "some of the lines – particularly the title cards, which pop up to offer back stories", while saying "there is a lack of heart to the movie".

Dustin Putman of The Film File awarded two and a half stars out of four and wrote the interconnected stories are "interesting without being particularly involving", but "the force of the splendid performances take hold and, along with Roos' easeful, non-showy cinematic handle, buoy the film above its more wobbly moments of indifference".

Director Don Roos has been noted for his depiction of sexual fluidity, which features in Happy Endings as well as other Roos films such as The Opposite of Sex.

=== Accolades ===
The 2005 Sundance Film Festival opened with this film.

Happy Endings received nominations for:

- Independent Spirit Award for "Best Supporting Female" – Maggie Gyllenhaal
- Satellite Awards
  - for "Outstanding Actor in a Supporting Role, Comedy or Musical" – Tom Arnold
  - for "Outstanding Actor in a Supporting Role, Comedy or Musical" – Steve Coogan
  - for "Outstanding Motion Picture, Comedy or Musical"
  - for "Outstanding Screenplay, Original" – Don Roos

== See also ==
- Hyperlink cinema – the film style of using multiple interconnected storylines
