= The Cremaster Cycle =

1994–2002 American film series

- Matthew Barney's 'Field Emblem' which is a recurrent motif in all five films
- Directed by: Matthew Barney
- Written by: Matthew Barney
- Produced by: Barbara Gladstone; Nancy Spector; Matthew Barney
- Starring: Matthew Barney; Aimee Mullins; Richard Serra; Dave Lombardo; Patty Griffin; Mike Bocchetti; Norman Mailer; Ursula Andress
- Cinematography: Peter Strietmann
- Edited by: Karen Heyson (Part 1); Mike Buday (Part 2); Toshi Onuki (Part 5)
- Music by: Jonathan Bepler
- Distributed by: Palm Pictures
- Running time: 398 minutes
- Country: United States
- Languages: English; Hungarian

The Cremaster Cycle is a series of five feature-length films, together with related sculptures, photographs, drawings, and artist's books, created by American visual artist and film-maker Matthew Barney.

The Cremaster Cycle was made over a period of eight years (1994–2002) and culminated in a major museum exhibition organized by Nancy Spector of the Solomon R. Guggenheim Museum in New York City, which traveled to the Museum Ludwig in Cologne and the Musée d'art Moderne in Paris from 2002–03. Barney's long-time collaborator Jonathan Bepler composed and arranged the soundtracks for the films. Isaac Mizrahi designed the costumes. The series incorporates a multidisciplinary narrative that heavily references connections between real people, real places and real things personal to Barney himself, but are all fictionalized to some extent.

== Overview ==
Guggenheim Museum curator Nancy Spector has described the Cremaster Cycle (1994–2002) as "a self-enclosed aesthetic system." The cycle includes the films as well as photographs, drawings, sculptures, and installations the artist produced in conjunction with each episode. Its conceptual departure point is the male cremaster muscle, the primary function of which is to raise and lower the testicles in response to temperature, and the number of films corresponds to the height of the gonads during the embryonic process of sexual differentiation. As such, the project is filled with anatomical allusions to the position of the reproductive organs during the embryonic process of sexual differentiation: Cremaster 1 represents the most "ascended" or undifferentiated state, Cremaster 5 the most "descended" or differentiated. The cycle repeatedly returns to those moments during early sexual development in which the outcome of the process is still unknown — in Barney's metaphoric universe, these moments represent a condition of pure potentiality. As the cycle evolved over eight years, Barney looked beyond biology as a way to explore the creation of form, employing narrative models from other realms, such as biography, mythology, and geology. Barney portrays, at various points, a satyr and Gary Gilmore. Ursula Andress portrays the Queen of Chain in Cremaster 5. Norman Mailer, Patty Griffin, and Dave Lombardo portray Harry Houdini, Nicole Baker, and Johnny Cash respectively in Cremaster 2. Richard Serra, Aimee Mullins, and Mike Bocchetti portray Hiram Abiff, Sadhbh, and the Grandmaster respectively, in Cremaster 3.

== Numerical and thematic chronology ==
Production order
| Film | Year |
|---|---|
| Cremaster 4 | 1994 |
| Cremaster 1 | 1995 |
| Cremaster 5 | 1997 |
| Cremaster 2 | 1999 |
| Cremaster 3 | 2002 |

While thematically the Cremaster films are chronological in the numbered order, they were not made or released in the same manner. The numerical order is the thematic order, while in order of production the films increased in production quality, ambition and scope, and they can alternatively be viewed in any order, as different views of a set of themes and preoccupations.

The films are significantly different in length; the longest (and last-made) is Cremaster 3, at over three hours, while the remaining four are approximately an hour each, for a total of approximately seven hours – #3 alone makes up almost half the total length of the cycle. Like Barney's other works, most of the films lack any particular dialogue with the exceptions being Cremaster 2 and 5, the latter of which is an opera sung in Hungarian.

An important precursor of The Cremaster Cycle is Drawing Restraint, which is also a biologically inspired multi-episode work in multiple media, also featuring the field emblem.

== Availability ==
The full series was released in a limited series of 20 sets of DVDs, sold for at least $100,000 each, in custom packaging and as fine art, rather than mass-market movies. In 2007 one disc (Cremaster 2) sold for $571,000. It came in a case “made from hand-tooled saddle leather, sterling silver, polycarbonate honeycomb, beeswax, acrylic and nutmeg”

The films are not available on mass-market DVDs, and according to the press release for the 2010 US tour, the cycle "is Not Now Nor Will it Ever be Available on DVD". The films are primarily available via periodic screenings. Palm Pictures, the distributor, has continued to comply with Barney's request, and has not made the series available on DVD, though there were some rumors and announcements to this effect in 2003. Only a 31-minute excerpt, the Guggenheim scene from Cremaster 3 titled "The Order," was released on mass-market DVD in 2003.

The failure to properly distribute the films has been described as a "blunder" originating in older, materialist concepts of video art which became irrelevant in the era of rapid, high-quality online distribution. Piracy of the cycle is common. Three of the films were pirated online as early as 2008, and a fourth was uploaded to a private tracker in 2014.

Marti Domination as Goodyear in Cremaster 1

Matthew Barney as the Entered Apprentice in Cremaster 3

== Reception ==
Reaction to the cycle is sharply divided – some consider it a major work of art, on a par with Un chien andalou and The Waste Land, while others dismiss it as vapid, self-indulgent tedium. This is summarized by one critic as "Barney's cinematic art inspires both awe and revulsion, often simultaneously." Indeed, the Village Voice featured two reviews, with Jerry Saltz praising the cycle, and J. Hoberman panning it.

Lavish praise includes: "The Cremaster Cycle by Matthew Barney is the first truly great piece of cinema to be made in a fine art context since Dalí and Buñuel filmed Un chien andalou in 1929. It is one of the most imaginative and brilliant achievements in the history of avant-garde cinema." In 1999, when three of its entries (the fourth, first, and fifth) had been made, Michael Kimmelman of The New York Times hailed Barney as "the most important American artist of his generation." It has also, on the other hand, received scathing criticism as "a mostly tedious succession of striking but vacant imagery whose effect diminishes the longer you look at it," from which "any sense of mystery or wonder is drained."

The images are roundly praised however, and some (Hoberman) feel that the movies work well as parts of installations, due to visual elements, though not as movies, due to poor editing and pacing.
