= Marvelous (film) =

- Directed by: Síofra Campbell
- Written by: Síofra Campbell
- Produced by: Síofra Campbell; Ian Moore
- Starring: Martha Plimpton
- Cinematography: Sean Kirby
- Edited by: Joe Klotz
- Music by: Dominic Rippel
- Release date: April 30, 2006 (Tribeca Film Festival)
- Running time: 90 min.
- Country: United States
- Language: English

Marvelous is a 2006 American drama/comedy written and directed by Síofra Campbell.

== Plot ==
Gwen (Martha Plimpton), is living with her sister Queenie (Amy Ryan) after getting divorced. Gwen has the ability to magically fix broken machinery and heal sick and injured people.

The film explores the effect that celebrity has on Gwen and her family and friends.

== Cast ==
Actor / Actress	Character
Martha Plimpton	Gwen
Ewen Bremner	Lars
Amy Ryan	Queenie
Annabella Sciorra	Lara

== Critical reception ==
Marvelous received mixed reviews. Ronnie Scheib of Variety praised the "marvelously peculiar dialogue" and the good work of the actors. The reviewer at Moviefone.com called it "a memorable satire." However, New York magazine found the script "uneven" and praised the work of Ewen Bremner, but felt the rest of the cast was overacting. MSN movies gave it three stars out of five.
