= Ancient Evenings =

1983 historical novel by Norman Mailer

- Cover of the first edition
- Author: Norman Mailer
- Cover artist: Frank Fisher (photographer)
- Language: English
- Genre: Historical novel
- Publisher: Little, Brown & Company
- Publication date: 1983
- Publication place: United States
- Media type: Print (hardcover and paperback)
- Pages: 709
- ISBN: 0-316-54410-8
- OCLC: 9019063
- Dewey Decimal: 813/.54 19
- LC Class: PS3525.A4152 A79 1983

Ancient Evenings is a 1983 historical novel by American author Norman Mailer. Set in ancient Egypt and dealing with the lives of the characters Menenhetet One and Meni, the novel received mixed reviews. Reviewers noted the historical research that went into writing it and considered Mailer successful at conveying the nature of ancient Egyptian life. However, they also criticized the novel's narration and questioned its literary merit. Ancient Evenings has been compared to the work of the poet James Merrill and the novelist Thomas Pynchon, as well as to Mailer's novel Harlot's Ghost (1991). Some have suggested that its opening passage is its strongest part. Ancient Evenings served as an inspiration for the artist Matthew Barney's operatic film River of Fundament (2014).

Most but not all of the novel takes place on one long evening in 1123 or 1122 BCE, during which the characters (including Ramesses IX) tell stories of the past. The majority of the book concerns the reign of Ramesses II, approximately 150 years before the night of the narrative; the Battle of Kadesh (1274 BCE) is in turn the central event of this sub-narrative.

== Summary ==
=== The Awakening ===
Ancient Evenings is set in ancient Egypt. The novel opens with the reflections of a person who does not know who he is or what he was. Its characters include Menenhetet One and Meni living in the rule of Ramesses IX.

=== The Book of One Man Dead ===
An unnamed narrator finds himself inexplicably and painfully thrust into the burial chambers of Pharaoh Khufu. He leaves the pharaoh's tomb, recognizes the tomb of Menenhetet Two, and enters to find it in disarray.

=== Discovery Of Identity ===
In Menenhetet Two's chambers, he details the stages of death and names the seven lights and shadows: Ren, Sekhem, Khu, Ba, Ka, Khaibit, and Sekhu.Toward the end of this book, the unnamed narrator discovers he is Menenhetet Two (Meni), and his corpse occupies the very tomb he's exploring.

=== Meeting The Ancestor ===
His great-grandfather and the origin of his name, Menenhetet One (Menenhetet), appears. Not knowing his great-grandfather in life, Meni initially fears the man who appears dressed as a High Priest. Menenhetet mentors and guides his grandson's journey into the afterlife.

=== The Book of the Gods ===
Menenhetet and Meni continue their journey together in "The Book of the Gods", Menenhetet teaching Meni the history of the gods to prepare him for possible encounters in the Land of the Dead. Menenhetet starts with the marriage of Ra, his wife Nut, and Nut's lover Geb. Nut subsequently bore five children, who were all attributed to Ra: Osiris, Horus, Set, Isis and Nephthys. Menenhetet continues, detailing the lives and histories of Nut's five children, their unions, resulting children, travels, and encounters. All the while, Meni is discovering his great-grandfather. Throughout, the fluidity of the experiences shift from an earthly realm to a spiritual one. Meni receives these lessons through face-to-face discussions with Menenhetet and through Menenhetet's visits from within his thoughts. Others, like Ra, also add to the lessons through spiritual methods. The affair between Isis and Horus is absent from the lessons of this book, and Menenhetet and Meni continue their journey into the next book by transporting from the tomb to Necropolis.

== Publication history ==
Ancient Evenings was first published in the United Kingdom in 1983 by Macmillan London Limited.

== Reception ==
Ancient Evenings was an inspiration for the writer William S. Burroughs's novel The Western Lands (1987) and for the artist Matthew Barney's operatic film River of Fundament. In an interview, Barney stated that when he read Ancient Evenings, following Mailer's encouragement, he found that it had "something in it structurally that appealed to me very much", and despite disliking aspects such as its emphasis on Egyptian mythology and sexuality, felt challenged to develop it into a film. Ancient Evenings has been praised by commentators such as the novelist Anthony Burgess and the critic Harold Bloom. Burgess considered the book one of the best English novels since 1939. Writing in 1984, he suggested that it was "perhaps the best reconstruction of the far past" since Gustave Flaubert's Salammbô (1862). He also described it as Mailer's best novel since The Naked and the Dead (1948). Bloom gave the novel a positive review in The New York Review of Books, where he compared it to the work of the poet James Merrill, noting that both were influenced by the poet W. B. Yeats. He believed that while the novel "defies usual aesthetic standards", it had "spiritual power" as well as "a relevance to current reality in America that actually surpasses that of Mailer’s largest previous achievement, The Executioner’s Song" as "Mailer’s fantasies, now brutal and unpleasant, catch the precise accents of psychic realities within and between us." He believed that the book rivaled novelist Thomas Pynchon's Gravity's Rainbow (1973) as an exercise in "monumental sado-anarchism." He suggested that it had an underlying motive similar to that of the writer D. H. Lawrence's The Plumed Serpent (1926). Bloom later described Ancient Evenings as "exuberantly inventive". He compared the nightmare that opens the novel to passages in Johann Wolfgang von Goethe's Faust, and suggested that it was its strongest part. He argued that it is no longer possible for historical novels to become part of the Western canon of literature and that the work "could not survive its placement in the ancient Egypt of The Book of the Dead".

The novel also received a positive review from the critic George Stade in The New Republic. Stade praised its opening passage, writing that its language was "powerful and disorienting". He described the novel as "exhilarating" and credited Mailer with developing its narrative with "patient and masterful skill" and presenting "fully and rigorously a form of consciousness that will seem at once alien and familiar to the modern reader." He criticized some parts of the novel for their "unintentional comedy", but believed that they did not undermine the work as a whole. He considered it better in some respects than Lawrence's Women in Love (1920), and concluded that it was a "permanent contribution to the possibilities of fiction and our communal efforts at self-discovery." Time listed Ancient Evenings as a must-read. Philip Kuberski compared the novel to Merrill's The Changing Light at Sandover. He credited Mailer with demonstrating "the interdependence of the physical and the metaphysical, sexuality and death, critique and creation".

However, the novel received mixed reviews from Dennis Forbes in The Advocate, Earl Rovit in Library Journal, the critic Richard Poirier in The Times Literary Supplement, and D. Keith Mano in National Review. Forbes was impressed by Mailer's understanding of ancient Egyptian history, specifically the "19th and 20th dynasties of Ramsessid Egypt". He believed that Mailer was mistaken only on minor details. He also credited Mailer with conveying "the fabric and flavor and aroma" of ancient Egypt. However, he considered the novel "plodding" and "essentially plotless" and believed that Mailer's use of reincarnation and telepathy as literary devices confused the narration. He wrote that it was not a "candidate for a quick read". Rovit wrote that while the novel contained "richly realized characters" and showed "the sensuous texture of ancient Egyptian life", the tone of its narration, along with other features of it, tended to "drain the action of political and psychological complexity while denying the suspense inherent in the story-line" and that there was sometimes "too much information." Poirier described the novel as "the strangest of Norman Mailer's books" and "at once his most accomplished and his most problematic work." He noted that American reviewers of the novel "found things to make fun of". He compared it to the work of Pynchon, suggesting that Mailer similarly found it difficult to "resist displays of his encyclopedic researches". He also compared it to the writer Joseph Conrad's Nostromo (1904), though he considered Mailer less successful than Conrad at "creating suspense and expectation" and suggested that many readers would feel "disaffection or impatience" with Ancient Evenings. He considered its motive to be "to claim some ultimate spiritual and cultural status" for the writer of fiction. Mano wrote that the novel was the product of impressive historical research and would "intrigue the soul". He credited Mailer with creating a "subtle and pervasive Egyptian Weltanschauung." However, he added that it would sometimes bore the reader and was, "half mad, half brilliant".

Some reviewers described Ancient Evenings as unreadable. The novel received negative reviews from the journalist James Wolcott in Harper's Magazine and Gary Giddens in The Nation. Wolcott wrote that while Mailer presented Ancient Evenings as the culmination of his work, the novel was unsuccessful. Giddens noted that the novel had become a best-seller, but considered it a failure. He wrote that it had been greeted with disdain, contained little that was surprising, and was inferior to The Executioner's Song. While he granted that it contained some "extraordinarily fine passages", he nevertheless found it "at once preposterous and banal." Tara Marvel described the novel as "often-unreadable", and suggested that the reason Mailer "feels the need for so much macho bluster" is that his best writing has an "unmistakable feminine delicacy." Joshua Mack wrote that the novel dealt with "grand themes of resurrection and transformation" and noted its influence on Barney, but described it as "overly turgid". The English professor Kathryn Hume noted that the novel was the product of laborious research into ancient Egyptian religious practices, but that Mailer was criticized for appealing to a popular taste for "novelty locations" and that reviewers disliked Mailer's exploration of taboo subjects, sometimes dismissing it as obsessive and infantile. She compared the novel to Harlot's Ghost, and suggested that the way its characters engaged in "out-of-body mental travel" and heard voices was reminiscent of the psychologist Julian Jaynes's hypothesis about the origins of consciousness. Robert L. Caserio noted that, as with other novels published by Mailer since 1983, Ancient Evenings had attracted little comment from academic critics. He attributed this to the influence of feminism. In an interview with John Whalen-Bridge, Mailer described Ancient Evenings as his most ambitious book, alongside Harlot's Ghost, saying that he was "amazed that people won't go near those books." He considered Ancient Evenings a partly successful and partly unsuccessful work that would have been better had it been restricted to the Battle of Kadesh. He described his objective in the novel as being "to take the average movie story of a suspense film and make it believable" and to show the beliefs of the ancient Egyptians. Whalen-Bridge described it as an "orientalist fantasy" and suggested that it encouraged readers to identify with "imperial America."

Other reviews of the novel include those by the pornographer Boyd McDonald in the New York Native and the novelist Benjamin DeMott in The New York Times Book Review.
