= Matthew Barney =

American contemporary artist and director (born 1967)

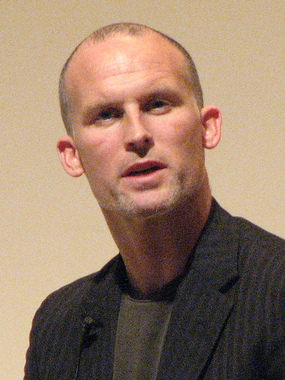
- Barney in 2007
- Born: March 25, 1967 (age 59); San Francisco, California, U.S.
- Education: Yale University
- Known for: Film, video art, sculpture, photography
- Notable work: The Cremaster Cycle
- Partner(s): Mary Farley (1993–2002); Björk (2000–2013)
- Children: 1
- Awards: Hugo Boss Prize

Matthew Barney (born March 25, 1967) is an American contemporary artist and film director who works in the fields of sculpture, film, photography and drawing. His works explore connections among geography, biology, geology and mythology as well as notable themes of sex, intercourse, the human body, and conflict. His early pieces were sculptural installations combined with performance and video. Between 1994 and 2002, he created The Cremaster Cycle, a series of five films described by Jonathan Jones in The Guardian as "one of the most imaginative and brilliant achievements in the history of avant-garde cinema." He is also known for his projects Drawing Restraint 9 (2005), River of Fundament (2014) and Redoubt (2018).

== Early life, family and education ==
Matthew Barney was born March 25, 1967, as the younger of two children in San Francisco, California, where he lived until he was seven years old. He resided in Boise, Idaho from 1973 to 1985, where his father got a job administering a catering service at Boise State University and where he attended elementary, middle, and high school. His parents divorced, and his mother, an abstract painter, relocated to New York City, where he would frequently visit. It was there where he was first introduced to the art scene.

Barney was recruited by Yale University in 1985 to play football; planned to study pre-med, but he also intended to study art. In 1989, he graduated from Yale. His earliest works, created at Yale, were staged at the university's Payne Whitney Gymnasium.

== Career ==
In the 1990s, Barney moved to New York, where he worked as a catalog model, a career that helped him finance his early work as an artist.

He is represented by Gladstone Gallery.

== Works ==
=== Drawing Restraint (1987–present) ===
The Drawing Restraint series began in 1987 as a series of studio experiments, drawing upon an athletic model of development in which growth occurs only through restraint: the muscle encounters resistance, becomes engorged and is broken down, and in healing becomes stronger. In literally restraining the body while attempting to make a drawing, Drawing Restraint 1–6 (1987–89) were documentations made using video and photography. Drawing Restraint 7 marks the influx of narrative and characterization, resulting in a three channel video and a series of drawings and photographs, for which Barney was awarded the Aperto Prize in the 1993 Venice Biennale.

A series of ten vitrines containing drawings, Drawing Restraint 8 was included in the 2003 Venice Biennale and prefigured the narrative development for Drawing Restraint 9 (2005). A major project consisting of a feature-length film and soundtrack composed by Björk, large-scale sculptures, photographs and drawings, Drawing Restraint 9 was built upon themes such as the Shinto religion, the tea ceremony, the history of whaling, and the supplantation of blubber with refined petroleum for oil. A full-scale survey of Barney's work through Drawing Restraint 9 was held at the San Francisco Museum of Modern Art in 2006 and included over 150 objects of varying media. Drawing Restraint 10 – 16 (2005–07) are site-specific performances that recall the earlier Yale pieces.

Drawing Restraint 17 and 18 were performed at the Schaulager in Basel in 2010 in conjunction with the exhibition "Prayer Sheet with the Wound and the Nail," a survey of the Drawing Restraint series through Drawing Restraint 18.

Drawing Restraint 19 employs a skateboard as a drawing tool. A block of graphite is mounted beneath the skateboard deck on the front end of the board. A skater performs a nose manual (a wheelie on the nose of the board, leaning in the direction of movement) across a smooth surface, tipping the nose of the board forward and leaving behind a drawn graphite line. The piece was part of a benefit art show and auction titled "Good Wood", raising awareness and funds for Power House Productions' Ride It Sculpture Park in Detroit, Michigan. The riding was performed on site by skateboarder Lance Mountain, documented by photographer Joe Brook and published by Juxtapoz Magazine in their February 2013 issue. The board was acquired by People Skate and Snowboard and is currently displayed at the company’s only retail location in Keego Harbor, Michigan.

=== The Cremaster Cycle (1994–2002) ===
Matthew Barney's epic Cremaster cycle (1994–2002) is a self-enclosed aesthetic system consisting of five feature-length films that explore processes of creation. The cycle unfolds not just cinematically, but also through the photographs, drawings, sculptures, and installations the artist produces in conjunction with each episode. Its conceptual departure point is the male cremaster muscle, which controls testicular contractions in response to external stimuli. Barney's long-time collaborator Jonathan Bepler composed and arranged the films’ soundtracks.

The project is rife with anatomical allusions to the position of the reproductive organs during the embryonic process of sexual differentiation: Cremaster 1 represents the most "ascended" or undifferentiated state, Cremaster 5 the most "descended" or differentiated. The cycle repeatedly returns to those moments during early sexual development in which the outcome of the process is still unknown. In Barney's metaphoric universe, these moments represent a condition of pure potentiality. As the cycle evolved over eight years, Barney looked beyond biology as a way to explore the creation of form, employing narrative models from other realms, such as biography, mythology, and geology. The photographs, drawings, and sculptures radiate outward from the narrative core of each film installment. Barney's photographs—framed in plastic and often arranged in diptychs and triptychs that distill moments from the plot—often emulate classical portraiture. His graphite and petroleum jelly drawings represent key aspects of the project's conceptual framework.

=== River of Fundament (2006–2014) ===
River of Fundament takes the form of a three-act opera and is loosely based on Norman Mailer’s novel Ancient Evenings. In collaboration with composer Jonathan Bepler, Barney combines traditional modes of narrative cinema with filmed elements of performance, sculpture, and opera, reconstructing Mailer’s hypersexual story of Egyptian gods and the seven stages of reincarnation, alongside the rise and fall of the American car industry.

Barney replaced the human body with the body of the 1967 Chrysler Imperial that was the central motif from his earlier film Cremaster 3. The film’s central scene is an abstraction of Mailer’s wake, set in a replica of the late author’s apartment in Brooklyn Heights and featuring Maggie Gyllenhaal, Paul Giamatti, Elaine Stritch, Ellen Burstyn, Peter Donald Badalamenti II, Joan La Barbara, and jazz percussionist Milford Graves.

=== Redoubt (2018–2021) ===
Barney began producing a new two-hour film, Redoubt, in 2017, which premiered in March 2019. It is set in the Sawtooth Range of Idaho, United States, and uses multiple layers of myths, including the myth of Diana and Actaeon, as well as references to the controversial reintroduction of wolves into the Sawtooth Mountains and metallurgy, to discuss "humanity's place in the natural world". The Yale University Art Gallery debuted Redoubt on March 1, 2019, alongside an exhibition of large bronze and brass sculptures and electroplated engravings inspired by the film. The show traveled afterward to UCCA Beijing (2019-2020), then Hayward Gallery in London (2020- 2021).

=== Performance ===
Barney has explored live performance before an audience. The pieces REN and Guardian of the Veil revisit the language of the Cremaster Cycle, via a ritualistic exploration of Egyptian symbolism inspired by Norman Mailer's novel Ancient Evenings. Guardian of the Veil took place on July 12, 2007, at the Manchester International Festival in England. REN took place on May 18, 2008, in Los Angeles. His October 2, 2010 performance, KHU, the second part in his seven-part performance series in collaboration with Jonathan Bepler inspired by Ancient Evenings, took place in Detroit.

In June 2009, a collaboration between Barney and Elizabeth Peyton, titled Blood of Two, was performed for the opening of the Deste Foundation's exhibition space, the Slaughterhouse, located on the Greek island Hydra. The two-hour performance involved divers retrieving from a nearby cove a vitrine containing drawings which had been submerged for months. A funeral-like procession of fishermen carried the case up a winding set of stairs. At one point, a dead shark was laid on the case, and the fishermen proceeded to the gallery space, carrying the case and shark, accompanied by the onlookers and a herd of goats. At the Slaughterhouse, the case was opened, water poured out, and the drawings revealed. The shark was eventually cooked and fed to the guests.

=== Public projects ===
In June 2017, Barney, local art curator Brandon Stosuy, and other artists installed Remains Board (informally, the "Trump countdown clock") on his studio in Long Island City. The board is a large seven-segment digital clock, visible from the United Nations and midtown Manhattan, counting down the days, hours, and minutes remaining in the U.S. president Donald Trump's first term. The Remains Board was initially illuminated during a durational performance of physical comedy by Josh Fadem. On inauguration day in 2021, at 12:00 p.m., Haela Hunt-Hendrix of Liturgy performed a guitar solo beneath the Remains Board as the clock began to approach 00:00:00.

== Exhibitions ==
Following his inclusion in two group shows at Althea Viafora gallery in New York in 1990, Barney's solo debut in 1991 at the Barbara Gladstone Gallery was hailed by The New York Times as "an extraordinary first show". That same year, at the age of twenty-four, he had a solo exhibition at the San Francisco Museum of Modern Art. The Museum Boijmans Van Beuningen, Rotterdam, organized a solo exhibition of his work that toured Europe throughout 1995 and 1996. Barney was subsequently included in many international exhibitions, such as documenta 9 in Kassel (1992); the 1993 and 1995 Biennial exhibitions at the Whitney Museum of American Art, New York; and Aperto ’93 at the 48th Venice Biennale, for which he was awarded the Europa 2000 Prize. For the season 2000/2001 in the Vienna State Opera, Barney designed a large scale picture (176 sqm) as part of the exhibition series "Safety Curtain", conceived by museum in progress.

"Matthew Barney: The Cremaster Cycle", an exhibition of artwork from the entire cycle organized by the Solomon R. Guggenheim Museum, premiered at the Museum Ludwig, Cologne, in June 2002 and subsequently traveled to the Musée d'Art Moderne de la Ville de Paris and the Guggenheim Museum in New York. A large-scale exhibition of the entire “Drawing Restraint” series was organized by the 21st Century Museum for Contemporary Art, Kanazawa, in 2005 and traveled to Leeum, Samsung Museum of Art, Seoul; San Francisco Museum of Modern Art; Serpentine Gallery, London; and Kunsthalle Wien, Vienna. Barney has also had major solo exhibitions organized by Astrup Fearnley Museum of Modern Art in Oslo (2003), Living Art Museum in Reykjavik (2003), Sammlung Goetz in Munich (2007), and Fondazione Merz in Turin (2008). His work has been included in major group exhibitions including "Moving Pictures" at Solomon R. Guggenheim Museum in New York and Guggenheim Bilbao (2002), Venice Biennale (2003), "Quartet: Barney, Gober, Levine, Walker" at Walker Art Center in Minneapolis (2005), Biennial of Moving Images at Centre pour l’Image Contemporaine in Paris (2005), and "All in the Present Must Be Transformed: Matthew Barney and Joseph Beuys" at Deutsche Guggenheim in Berlin (2006).

In 2013, the Morgan Library & Museum mounted “Subliming Vessel: The Drawings of Matthew Barney”, the first museum retrospective devoted to the artist's drawings, later traveling to the Bibliothèque Nationale de France in Paris. In 2014, Barney exhibited "River of Fundament" at Haus der Kunst, Munich. The exhibition later traveled to the Museum of Old and New Art, Hobart, Tasmania and the Museum of Contemporary Art, Los Angeles. "River of Fundament" was considered the largest filmic project since the Cremaster Cycle and first major museum solo exhibition in Los Angeles. In 2019, the Yale University Art Gallery exhibited "Matthew Barney: Redoubt," the first solo museum exhibition in the U.S. since the presentation of "River of Fundament" at the Museum of Contemporary Art, Los Angeles, in 2015–16.

== Critical analysis ==
Barney's work has provoked strong critical reaction, both positive and negative. Barney's work has been compared to performance artists Chris Burden and Vito Acconci, and some critics have argued that Barney's art is simultaneously a critique and a celebration of commercialism and blockbuster filmmaking. Commenting on the Cremaster series' enigmatic nature, Alexandra Keller and Frazer Ward write:

"Rather than reading Cremaster, we are encouraged to consume it as high-end eye candy, whose symbolic system is available to us but hardly necessary to our pleasure: meaning, that is, is no longer a necessary component to art production or reception. Left to its own devices-and it is all devices, Cremaster places us in a framework of mutually assured consumption, consuming us as we consume it."

The philosopher Arthur C. Danto, well known for his work on aesthetics, has praised Barney's work, noting the importance of Barney's use of sign systems such as Masonic symbology.

Others have asserted Barney's works are contemporary expressions of surrealism. In the words of Chris Chang, Barney's Cremaster films, though "completely arcane, hermetic and solipsistic ... nevertheless periodically provide some of the most enigmatically beautiful experimental film imagery you'll ever see."

"Is Barney's work a new beginning for a new century?", asks Richard Lacayo, writing in Time. "It feels more like a very energetic longing for a beginning, in which all kinds of imagery have been put to the service of one man's intricate fantasy of return to the womb. Something lovely and exasperating is forever in formation there. Will he ever give birth?"

"Barney is the real thing. When he brings his boundless imagination to a subject he goes down to its depths to create images and implant ideas that stay in your mind for ever" writes art historian Richard Dorment in The Daily Telegraph.

Kanye West also admires Barney's work and credited him as an influence on the music video for West's song "Famous".

== Personal life ==
In the late 1990s, in New York City, he met Icelandic artist Björk in the art scene. The pair formed a relationship and started living together, moving to Brooklyn Heights in 2000 and living in a penthouse co-op. Their daughter was born in 2002. Barney and Björk initially kept their work separate, but then collaborated on his art film Drawing Restraint 9, a long-term project released in 2005; Björk acted in the film and also contributed musical elements. By September 2013, Barney and Björk were no longer a couple; Björk chronicled the breakup in her 2015 album Vulnicura. At the time, Björk described the breakup as "the most painful thing" that she had ever experienced. The album Vulnicura, and in particular the track "Black Lake", were written about the breakup.

As of 2014, Barney maintained a studio in Long Island City, Queens.

== Awards and prizes ==
- Europa 2000 Prize, Aperto '93, 45th Venice Biennale, 1993.
- Hugo Boss Prize, Guggenheim Museum, 1996.
- James D. Phelan Art Award in Video, Bay Area Video Coalition, San Francisco Foundation, 1999.
- Glen Dimplex Award, Irish Museum of Modern Art, Dublin, 2002.
- Kaiser Ring Award, Museum für moderne Kunst, Goslar, Germany, 2007.
- Golden Gate Persistence of Vision Award, 54th San Francisco International Film Festival, 2011.

== Publications ==
- Kirk, Kara. Matthew Barney: New Work. San Francisco Museum of Modern Art, San Francisco, 1991. ISBN 0-918471-23-0.
- Wakefield, Neville, and Richard Flood. Pace Car for the Hubris Pill. Museum Boijmans Van Beuningen, Rotterdam, 1995. ISBN 90-6918-148-7.
- Barney, Matthew. Cremaster 4. Foundation Cartier, Paris and Barbara Gladstone Gallery, New York, 1995. ISBN 978-2-86925-051-2.
- Kertess, Klaus. Matthew Barney: Drawing Restraint Volume 7. Cantz Verlag, Ostfildern, Germany, 1996. ISBN 978-3893227921.
- Barney, Matthew. Cremaster 1. Kunsthalle Wien, Museum für Gegenwartskunst Basel, Basel, 1997. ISBN 3-85247-013-7.
- Barney, Matthew. Cremaster 5. Portikus, Frankfurt, and Barbara Gladstone Gallery, New York, 1997. ISBN 978-1-881616-87-0.
- Flood, Richard, and Matthew Barney. Cremaster 2. Walker Art Center, Minneapolis, 1999. ISBN 978-0-935640-64-9.
- Barney, Matthew. Cremaster 3. Guggenheim Museum, Distributed Art Publishers, Inc., New York, 2002. ISBN 0-89207-253-9.
- Barney, Matthew. Matthew Barney/The Cremaster Cycle. Meeting House Square, Temple Bar, Dublin, 2002.
- Spector, Nancy, and Neville Wakefield. Matthew Barney: The Cremaster Cycle. Guggenheim Museum Publications and Harry N. Abrams, Inc., New York, 2002. ISBN 0-8109-6935-1.
- Kvaran, Gunnar B., and Nancy Spector. Matthew Barney: The Cremaster Cycle. Astrup Fearnley Museet for Moderne Kunst, Oslo, 2003. ISBN 978-8291430379.
- McKee, Francis, Hans Ulrich Obrist, and Matthew Barney. Drawing Restraint Volume 1. Walther König, Cologne, 2005. ISBN 0-9795077-0-7.
- Hasegawa, Itsuko, and Shinichi Nakagawa. Drawing Restraint Volume 2. Uplink Co., Tokyo, 2005. ISBN 4-900728-14-4.
- Barney, Matthew. Drawing Restraint Volume 3. Leeum Samsung Museum of Art, Seoul, 2005. ISBN 89-85468-34-0.
- Barney, Matthew. Drawing Restraint Volume 4. JMc & GHB Editions, New York and Sammlung-Goetz, Munich, 2007. ISBN 978-0-9795077-0-0.
- Wakefield, Neville. Drawing Restraint Volume 5. Walther König, Cologne, 2007. ISBN 978-3-86560-318-0.
- Barney, Matthew. Matthew Barney. Mönchehaus Museum für Moderne Kunst, Goslar, Germany, 2007.
- Barney, Matthew, Karsten Löckemann, and Stephan Urbaschek. Matthew Barney. Kunstverlag Ingvild Goetz, Munich, 2007. ISBN 978-3-939894-09-4.
- Barney, Matthew, and Olga Gambari. Matthew Barney: mitologie contemporanee. Fondazione Merz, Turin, 2009. ISBN 978-88-7757-235-6.
- Cook, Angus. Matthew Barney and Elizabeth Peyton: Blood of Two. Deste Foundation for Contemporary Art, Greece, Walther König, Cologne, 2009. ISBN 978-9609931403
- Barney, Matthew. Drawing Restraint Volume 6. Schaulager/Laurenz Foundation, Basel, 2010.
- Barney, Matthew. Matthew Barney: KHU Playbill. Barney Studio, New York, 2010.
- Barney, Matthew. Matthew Barney: Prayer Sheet with the Wound and the Nail. Schaulager, Switzerland, and Schwabe Verlag Basel, Basel, 2010. ISBN 978-3796527067
- Barney, Matthew. Matthew Barney: DJED Playbill, Gladstone Gallery, New York, 2011.
- Dervaux, Isabelle. Subliming Vessel: the Drawings of Matthew Barney. The Morgan Library & Museum, New York, 2013. ISBN 978-0-8478-3976-6
- Enwezor, Okwui, Hilton Als, Diedrich Diederichsen, Homi K. Bhabha, David Walsh, and Louise Neri. River of Fundament. N.Y: Skira Rizzoli, New York, 2014.
- Barney, Matthew, Pamela Franks, and Elisabeth Hodermarsky. Matthew Barney: Redoubt. Conn: Yale University Press, New Haven, 2019. ISBN 978-0-300-24327-7
- Barney, Matthew, Pamela Franks, and Elisabeth Hodermarsky with the introduction by Philip Tinari.《马修 · 巴尼：堡垒》. Culture and Art Publishing House, Beijing, 2019.ISBN 978-7-5039-6780-1
