= 2019 in art =

The year 2019 in art involved various significant events.

== Events ==
- February – Burger King launches an advertising campaign called "Eat Like Andy" in the United States. The television spot which premieres during Super Bowl LIII features archival documentary film footage from 66 Scenes from America by Jørgen Leth of the pop artist Andy Warhol (1928-1987) unwrapping and eating a Burger King Whopper, footage approved for use by the fast food giant courtesy of the Andy Warhol Foundation. Prior to the game the mass market hamburger chain makes available to viewers who ordered it in advance via DoorDash an "Andy Warhol Mystery Box" which contains among other items a plastic bottle of ketchup and a platinum wig so one can "Eat Like Andy".
- March
  - Italian scholars announce their opinion that a sculpture, The Virgin with the Laughing Child, loaned for an exhibition in Florence from London's Victoria and Albert Museum, is a work by Leonardo da Vinci of about 1472, making it the artist's only known surviving sculpture.
  - The Brant Foundation study center inaugurates a new East Village, Manhattan, New York City space in a former power station with an updated design by Gluckman Tang Architects. The opening exhibition is of works by Jean-Michel Basquiat in the neighborhood in which many of them were created.
  - David Hockney settles at La Grande Cour, a farmhouse and studio in Normandy, where he will begin a long series of graphic artworks, initially of the Spring.
- March 8–15 – The collection of work from the Young British Artists circle made from the mid-1990s by English pop singer George Michael (d. 2016) (including portraits of him by Jim Lambie and Michael Craig-Martin) is displayed and auctioned at Christie's, London, for charity.
- March 22 – The painting Vase with Poppies (oil on canvas 1886) by Vincent van Gogh held in the permanent collection of the Wadsworth Atheneum in Hartford, Connecticut, having been called into question by art historian Walter Feilchenfeldt in 1990, is declared authentic by the Van Gogh Museum in Amsterdam, where it has been sent to determine its status as to whether it was a work by the hand of the artist or an impostor.
- April 13–22 – Bird and Nature Festival (Festival de l'oiseau et de la nature)
- May 1 – In the United Kingdom, a sketch of a bearded man in the Royal Collection is identified as Leonardo da Vinci. It will be displayed for the first time in the Queen's Gallery at Buckingham Palace between May 24 and October 13, 2019, marking the 500th anniversary of the artist's death; as part of an exhibition which is set to be the largest showing of da Vinci's work in over 65 years.
- May 15 – Rabbit, a 1986 stainless steel sculpture by Jeff Koons, sells at auction at Christie's in New York City for slightly more than $91 million U.S. setting a new record for the most expensive work of art by a living artist ever sold at auction, besting the previous mark of $90 plus million achieved by the David Hockney painting Portrait of an Artist (Pool with Two Figures) which changed hands at the same branch of the same auction house in 2018.
- May 30–31 – Fédération photographique de France v Aurillacu
- June 6 – David Williams-Ellis's three bronze figures of soldiers are inaugurated as the first part of the British Normandy Memorial at Ver-sur-Mer on Gold Beach.
- July 1–2 – International Photographic Federation Bièvres (Fédération photographique de France)
- July 1–September 22 – Rencontres d'Arles
- August – The National Gallery in London in preparing Leonardo da Vinci's Madonna of the Rocks for an upcoming exhibition of work from the hand of the Florentine master at the museum discover beneath the finished painting an abandoned composition as well other assorted sketches by the storied creator of the Mona Lisa and not seen for more than five hundred years.
- September – A mural originally called "City" designed and created in 1929 at the Bauhaus by Josef Albers then sandblasted and reworked in the 1960s into the work "Manhattan" as commissioned by Walter Gropius for the PanAm Building is once more recreated from diagrams containing the artist's specifications (after the original was unrecoverable due to asbestos). It is then restored to its former home facing onto the skyscraper's lobby and atop the summit of the escalators moving up and down and into and out of Grand Central Terminal.
- September 7 – A Dallas, Texas man, Tevon Varlack, strikes the Wall Street Bull by Arturo Di Modica with a banjo leaving a sizable dent in the horn area of the work. During the following month, Di Modica and a team of metal workers from an upstate New York foundry arrive at the site and fix the wound to the artwork.
- September 14 – The sculpture America, an 18-karat solid gold toilet, by the Italian artist Maurizio Cattelan is stolen while installed at Blenheim Palace in the United Kingdom, where it was available for use as part of an exhibition of Cattelan's works (while on loan from the permanent collection of the Solomon R Guggenheim Museum in New York City). It had been placed in a water closet formerly used by Winston Churchill. As the work had been connected to the building's water pipes, the theft therein caused structural damage and flooding. A man is arrested in connection with the incident. Cattelan later commented: "I always liked heist movies and finally I'm in one of them."
- October 1 – A presumed Banksy art exhibition appears in a shop window in Croydon, London.
- October 3 – Banksy's painting Devolved Parliament (2009) is sold at Sotheby's, London, for just under £9.9m.
- October 7 – The Wall Street Bull by Arturo Di Modica is targeted for a second time when Extinction Rebellion activists throw fake blood over it and stage a die-in on the traffic plaza which is the sculpture's immediate surround.
- October 21 – The Museum of Modern Art (MoMA) in New York City which closed for improvements in June reopens after a $450 million makeover and the creation of additional galleries executed by the architects Diller Scofidio + Renfro.
- October 28 – Cimabue's Mocking of Christ (13th century), found in June hanging in a domestic French kitchen, sells at auction in France for 24 million euros (including fees).
- November – The Baltimore Museum of Art announces that during all of 2020 they will only acquire works created by women artists.
- November 7–10 – Paris Photo in Grand Palais in Paris
- November 14 – The Venice Biennale temporarily closes due to the highest flood waters to beset the city in some fifty years.
- November 25 – Thieves break into the Green Vault at the Dresden Castle in Dresden, Germany and steal an inestimable horde of jewelry and other precious objects dating back to the 18th century belonging to the German state of Saxony.

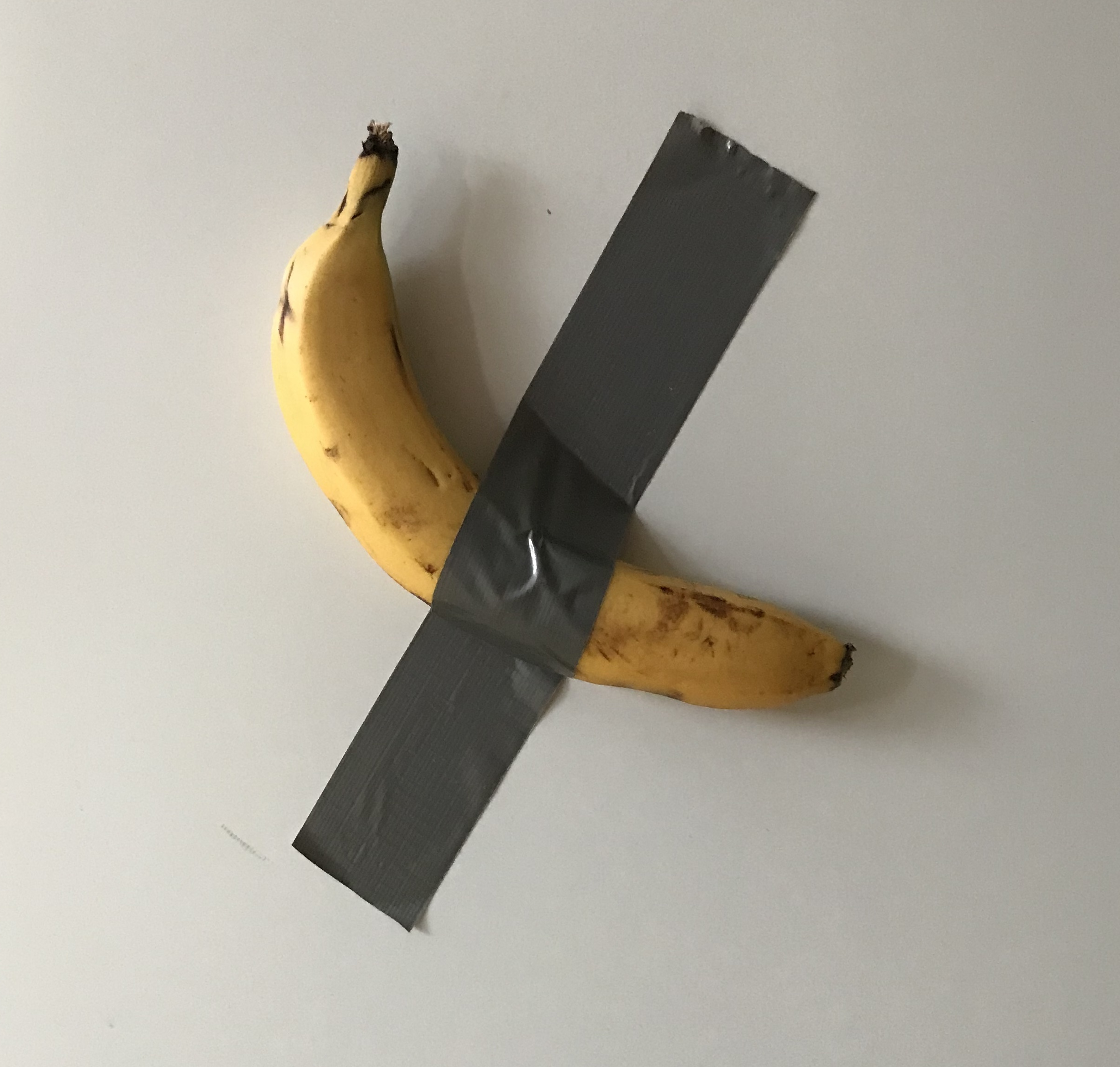
December 7 – The banana and duct tape in Comedian, an artwork created in an edition of three for the 2019 installation of Art Basel Miami Beach by Maurizio Cattelan, consisting of the aforementioned fruit held to a wall by duct tape (the initial one of which was sold to an unnamed French art collector for US$120,000) is summarily eaten by David Datuna a self-styled performance vigilante who names his piece Hungry Artist and says of the finished work "It was very delicious". Galerie Perrotin, the exhibitor of the work at the art fair, replaces the fruit and states that the work is an "idea".

- December – A gardener at the Galleria d'arte moderna Ricci Oddi in Piacenza, Italy stumbles upon the Gustav Klimt painting Portrait of a Lady which had been stolen from the same museum in 1997. It turns out the thieves – one of whom later grants an interview – planted the work back there four years earlier after the statute of limitations had run out on the theft. The picture, which is subsequently authenticated, was painted above an earlier work of a lover who died young. Portrait of a Lady is now valued at upwards of $65 million US. Of the one million plus works of art listed on the Italian theft database it was rated as the second most important following Caravaggio's Nativity with St. Francis and St. Lawrence which was stolen from the Oratory of San Lorenzo in Palermo in 1969.
- December 7 – The banana in Comedian, an artwork created in an edition of three for the 2019 installation of Art Basel Miami Beach by Maurizio Cattelan, consisting of the aforementioned fruit held to a wall by duct tape (the initial one of which was sold to an unnamed French art collector for US$120,000) is summarily eaten by David Datuna a self-styled performance vigilante who names his piece Hungry Artist and says of the finished work "It was very delicious". Galerie Perrotin, the exhibitor of the work at the art fair, replaces the fruit and states that the work is an "idea".
- December 10 – Rebecca Salter is elected as the first female President of the Royal Academy of Arts in London, taking up office the following month.
- December 28 – The Picasso painting Bust of a Woman on display at London's Tate Modern is damaged by a visitor.

== Exhibitions ==
- January 23 until April 14 – "Lucio Fontana: On the Threshold" at the Met Breuer and the Metropolitan Museum of Art Fifth Avenue in New York City.
- January 25 until July 10 and then July 24 until January 5, 2020 – "Implicit Tensions: Mapplethorpe Now" featuring the work of Robert Mapplethorpe at the Solomon R. Guggenheim Museum in New York City.
- February 5 until March 9 – Mirosław Bałka -"Random Access Memory" at White Cube in London.
- February 8 until May 12 – "Frida Kahlo – Appearances can be Deceiving" at the Brooklyn Museum in Brooklyn, New York.
- February 9 until April 6 – "Jasper Johns – Recent Paintings and Works on Paper" at the Matthew Marks Gallery in New York City.
- February 14 until May 20 – William Hunter and the Anatomy of the Modern Museum" at the Yale Center for British Art in New Haven, Connecticut.
- February 14 until. April 7 – "Piero Manzoni: Materials of His Time" at the Hauser & Wirth gallery in Los Angeles and then at the Hauser & Wirth gallery in New York City from April 26 until July 19.
- February 19 until June 2 – "Moroni; The Richness of Renaissance Portraiture" at the Frick Collection in New York City.
- February 21 until July 7 – "Verrocchio: Sculptor and Painter of Renaissance Florence" at the Palazzo Strozzi and the Museo Nazionale del Bargello in Florence, Italy and then traveled to the National Gallery of Art in Washington D.C. from September 15 until January 12, 2020.
- February 24 until June 15 – "Joan Miró: The Birth of the World" at MOMA in New York City.
- March 1 until June 16 – "Matthew Barney: Redoubt" at the Yale University Art Gallery in New Haven, Connecticut and then from September 28 until December 15 at Ullens Center for Contemporary Art in Beijing and from March 4, 2020, until May 10, 2020, at the Hayward Gallery in London.
- March 7 until May – Ashley Longshore: 37 large scale portraits of iconic female figures for Women's History Month at the Diane von Furstenberg store in New York City.
- March 9 until September 8 - "Agnes Pelton: Desert Transcendentalist" at the Phoenix Art Museum in Phoenix, Arizona.
- April 1 until April 13, 2022 - "Damien Hirst: Four Large Sculptures" at the Yorkshire Sculpture Park in West Bretton, West Yorkshire, England
- May 2 until September 15 – "Roger Brown: Virtual Still Lifes" at the Museum of Art and Design in New York City.
- May 7 until November 17 – "Helen Frankenthaler: Pittura/Panorama" at the Museum of Palazzo Grimani in Venice, Italy.
- May 10 until July 28 – "Alberto Burri: La pittura, irriducibile presenza" at the Cini Foundation in Venice, Italy.
- May 10 until October 20 – "Jean Dubuffet & Venezia" at the Palazzo Franchetti in Venice.
- May 11 until August 18 - David Hammons at Hauser & Wirth in Los Angeles, California.
- May 11 until October 13 – "Sean Scully: Human" at the Basilica of San Giorgio Maggiore in Venice.
- May 17 until September 22 – "The Whitney Biennial 2019" curated by Rujeko Hockley and Jane Panetta at the Whitney Museum of American Art in New York City.
- May 30 until September 1 – "Lee Krasner: Living Color" at the Barbican Art Gallery.
- June 8 until September 22 – "Renoir: The Body, The Senses" at the Clark Art Institute in Williamstown, Massachusetts
- June 9 until December 13 – "Leonardo Drew: City in the Grass" at Madison Square Park in New York City.
- June 10 until September 29 - Virgil Abloh: Figures of Speech at MOCA in Chicago, Illinois.
- June 19 until September 8 - "Cutting Edge: Modernist British Printmaking" at Dulwich Picture Gallery, London.
- June 28 until December 1 – "The Coming World: Ecology as the New Politics 2030-2100" at the Garage Museum of Contemporary Art in Moscow, Russia.
- July 11 until November 8 – "Carmen Herrera: "Estructuras Monumentales" at City Hall Park in New York City, New York.
- September 10 until October 26 – "Paul Klee: 1939" at the David Zwirner Gallery in New York City.
- September 18 until October 18 - "Kacper Abolik: Year of the Dog" at the Baum School of Art in Allentown, Pennsylvania.
- September 18 until January 12, 2020 – "Bertoldo di Giovanni: The Renaissance of Sculpture in Medici Florence" at the Frick Collection in New York City.
- October 4 until January 12, 2020 – John Singer Sargent: Portraits in Charcoal at the Morgan Library and Museum in New York City.
- October 5 until February 23, 2020 - Turner: Watercolors from Tate at the Mystic Seaport Museum in Mystic, Connecticut.
- October 7 until January 5, 2020 - "The Last Knight: The Art, Armor, and Ambition Maximilian I" at the Metropolitan Museum of Art in New York City curated by Pierre Terjanian.
- October 9 until January 5, 2020 – "Hogarth: Place and Progress" at Sir John Soane's Museum in London.
- October 19 until January 20, 2020 - Felix Vallotton: Painter of Disquiet at the Metropolitan Museum of Art in New York City.
- October 19 untî January 20, 2020 - Afrocosmologies: American Reflections at the Wadsworth Atheneum in Hartford, Connecticut.
- October 26 until February 23, 2020 - "Edward Hopper and the American Hotel" at the Virginia Museum of Fine Arts in Richmond, Virginia.
- November 25 until March 1. 2020 - "Making Marvels: Science & Splendor at the Courts of Europe" at the Metropolitan Museum of Art in New York City.

== Works ==
- Jean-Marie Appriou – The Horses installed on the corner of East 60th street at Central Park in New York City
- Maurizio Cattelan – Comedian
- George Condo – "Constellation of Voices" (aluminum and gold leaf sculpture) placed on the terrace of the Metropolitan Opera House at Lincoln Center in New York City
- David Datuna – Hungry Artist
- Martin Dawe
  - The First Graduate
  - The Three Pioneers
- Bob Dylan - Little Italy
- Leandro Erlich - "Order of Importance" installed on the beach in Miami Beach, Florida, United States.
- Meth Fountain - Pain at FIAC in Paris
- Jean Luc Godard Le Studio d'Orphée at the Fondazione Prada in Milan
- Isaac Julien – Lessons of the Hour (film installation)
- Titus Kaphar – Flay (James Madison)
- Jeff Koons - Bouquet of Tulips (permanently installed in Paris, France)
- Alicja Kwade – "ParaPivot" (Metropolitan Museum of Art roof garden commission)
- Don Lessem – Dump Trump (statue)
- James Little - "Cubist Rendezvous'"
- Mark Manders – Tilted Head
- Kent Monkman – "Mistikôsiwak (Wooden Boat People)", two large paintings "Resurgence of the People" and "Welcoming the Newcomers" commissioned by the Metropolitan Museum of Art in New York City for the building's Great Hall.
- Wangechi Mutu – Seated I, II, III and IV installed for the exhibition "The New Ones Will Free Us" (September 9 - January 12, 2020) on the front facade of the Metropolitan Museum of Art in New York City as the inaugural edition of a new yearly commission wherein are being and will continue to be employed four niches created for the display of free standing sculptures
- Felipe Pantone - optichromie – BUF (mural) in Buffalo, New York.
- Arvo Pärt, Steve Reich and Gerhard Richter – Reich Richter Pärt: two immersive live performances (April 6 – June 2), at The Shed at Hudson Yards in Manhattan, New York City
- Jennifer Rubell – Ivanka Vacuuming (performance piece)
- Sean Scully – Oppulent Ascension
- Sorawit Songsataya – "The Interior" at the Auckland Art Gallery
- Hank Willis Thomas - Society of the Spectacle (Spectrum IV
- Ronnie van Hout – "Boy Walking" installed in Potters Park in Auckland, New Zealand
- Leo Villareal – Illuminated River, illumination of London Thames bridges
- Kehinde Wiley – Rumors of War (equestrian sculpture)
- Domingo Zapata – Retrospective vinyl mural installed on the side of One Times Square in Times Square in New York City

== Awards ==
- The Artes Mundi prize – Apichatpong Weerasethakul
- Venice Biennale (May 11 – November 24)
  - Leone d'Oro for Lifetime Achievement: Jimmie Durham (United States)
  - Leone d'Oro for Best National Participation – Lina Lapelyte, Vaiva Grainyte, and Rugilė Barzdžiukaitė (Lithuania) for "Sun & Sea (Marina)" Curated by Lucia Pietroiusti with honorable mention to Jos de Gruyter and Harald Thys (Belgium) for "Mondo Cane"
  - Leone d'Oro for Best Participant in the International Exhibition – Arthur Jafa (United States) with special mentions to Teresa Margolles (Mexico) and Otobong Nkanga (Nigeria)
  - Silver Lion for a Promising Artist in the International Exhibition – Haris Epaminonda (Cyprus)

== Films ==
- The Goldfinch
- Redoubt

== Deaths ==
- January 10 – Gerd Jaeger, 91, German sculptor
- January 13 – Francine du Plessix Gray, 88, American writer, widow of Cleve Gray
- January 22 – Jonas Mekas, 96, Lithuanian-born American filmmaker, film archivist (Anthology Film Archives), poet and artist (Fluxus)
- January 28 – Susan Hiller, 78, American-born multimedia artist
- January 30 – Bernard Nevill, 88, English textile designer and art collector
- February 3 – Irving Lavin, 91, American art historian (Gianlorenzo Bernini)
- February 5 – Fumiko Hori, 100, Japanese Nihonga painter
- February 8 – Robert Ryman, 88, American painter
- February 12 – Bisi Silva, 56–57, Nigerian art curator
- February 18 – Alessandro Mendini, 88, Italian architect and designer (Groninger Museum)
- February 23 – Marella Angelli, 91, Italian art collector (Pinacoteca Giovanni e Marella Agnelli)
- March 1 – Kevin Roche, 96, Irish-born American architect (Metropolitan Museum of Art)
- March 3 – Lee Wen, 61, Singaporean performance artist
- March 6 – Carolee Schneemann, 79, American visual and performance artist
- March 11 – Martín Chirino, 94, Spanish sculptor
- March 12 – Sir John Richardson, 95, British art historian and Picasso biographer
- March 15
  - Luca Alinari, 75, Italian painter
  - Okwui Enwezor, 55, Nigerian curator, art critic, writer, poet, and educator
- March 16 – Barbara Hammer, 79, American filmmaker and visual artist
- March 19 – Rose Hilton, 87, British painter
- March 21 – Haku Shah, 84, Indian artist
- March 31 – Hedi Turki, 96, Tunisian painter
- April 2 – Herman Braun-Vega, 85, Peruvian painter
- April 3 – Jacqueline Lichtenstein, 72, French art historian and philosopher
- April 10 – Claude Lalanne, 93, French sculptor (Les Lalanne)
- April 20
  - Mavis Pusey, 90, Jamaican-born American painter
  - Monir Shahroudy Farmanfarmaian, 96, Iranian artist
  - Jayne Wrightsman, 99, American philanthropist and fine arts collector
- April 24
  - Ben Heller, 93 American art collector and writer
  - Michael Wolf, 64, German photographer
- April 26 – Zé do Carmo, 95, Brazilian ceramist
- May 9 - Thomas Nozkowski, 75, American painter
- May 14
  - Lutz Bacher, American conceptual artist
  - Nobuo Sekine, 76, Japanese sculptor
- May 16
  - Jamil Naqsh, 79, Pakistani painter
  - I.M. Pei, 102, Chinese born American architect (East Building of The National Gallery of Art, Louvre Pyramid, Museum of Islamic Art, Doha)
- May 21 – Lawrence Carroll, 64, Australian-born American painter
- May 26 – Everett Kinstler, 93, American painter
- May 29 – Tony DeLap, 91, American sculptor
- June 1 – Leah Chase, 96, American Creole chef and art collector
- June 4 – Joe Overstreet, 85, American painter
- June 9
  - Maryon Kantaroff, 85, Canadian sculptor
  - Adela Neffa, 96, Argentine-born Uruguayan sculptor
- June 13 – Joyce Pensato, 77, American painter
- June 14 – Martin Roth, 41, Austrian artist
- June 16
  - Charles Ginnever, 87, American Sculptor
  - Suzan Pitt, 75, American animator and painter
- June 17
  - Robert Therrien, 71, American sculptor
  - Gloria Vanderbilt, 95, American artist, fashion designer, socialite, and heiress
- June 21 – Peter Selz, 100, German born American art historian
- June 25 – Sascha Pohflepp, 41, German artist (death announced on this date)
- July 4 – Leon Kossoff, 92, British painter
- July 5 – Douglas Crimp, 74, American art historian, writer, and curator
- July 7 – Steve Cannon, 84, American novelist, playwright, and arts impresario (A Gathering of the Tribes)
- July 15 – Frieder Burda, 83, German art collector
- July 20 – Marisa Merz, 93, Italian artist (Arte Povera)
- July 27 – Carlos Cruz-Diez, 95, Venezuelan artist
- August 7 – Nancy Reddin Kienholz, 75, American artist widow of Edward Kienholz
- August 23 – Wang Guodong, 88, Chinese painter (portraits of Mao Zedong)
- September 3 – Peter Lindbergh, 74, German photographer and filmmaker
- September 5 - Francisco Toledo, 79, Mexican artist
- September 9 – Robert Frank, 94, Swiss-American photographer (The Americans) and documentary filmmaker (Cocksucker Blues)
- September 10 – Daniel Johnston, 58, American singer-songwriter and visual artist.
- September 23 – Huguette Caland, 88, Lebanese painter
- October 2 - Matthew Wong, 35, Canadian painter
- October 11
  - John Giorno, 82, American poet and performance artist
  - Ettore Spalletti, 79, Italian artist
- October 12 - E. A. Carmean, 74, American art curator (National Gallery of Art) and art historian
- October 13
  - Charles Jencks, 80, American architect, cultural theorist (Post-modernism)
  - Adolfo Mexiac, 92, Mexican graphic artist
- October 14 - Gunnar Torvund, 71, Norwegian sculptor
- October 15 - Stefan Edlis, 94, Austrian born American art collector and philanthropist
- October 18 - Edward Clark, 93, American painter
- October 20 - Huang Yong Ping, 65, Chinese-French artist
- October 21 - Gilberto Aceves Navarro, 88, Mexican artist
- November 1 - Rina Lazo, 96, Guatemalan-Mexican painter
- November 9 - Džemma Skulme, 94, Latvian artist and painter
- November 17 - Gustav Peichl, 91, Austrian architect (Kunst- und Ausstellungshalle der Bundesrepublik Deutschland).
- November 19 - Manoucher Yektai, 97, Iranian-American artist (New York School)
- December 3 - Johann Eyfells, 96, Icelandic artist
- December 9 - May Stevens, 95, American painter
- December 10
    - Ken Heyman, 89, American photographer
    - Emily Mason, 87, American painter
- December 13 - PHASE 2, 64, American graffiti artist
- December 14 - Panamarenko, 79, Belgian sculptor
- December 19 - Francisco Brennand, 92, Brazilian sculptor
- December 29 - Alasdair Gray, 85, Scottish artist and novelist
- December 30 - Syd Mead, 86, American concept artist (Blade Runner, Aliens, Tron)
