= Courage =

Ability to deal with fear

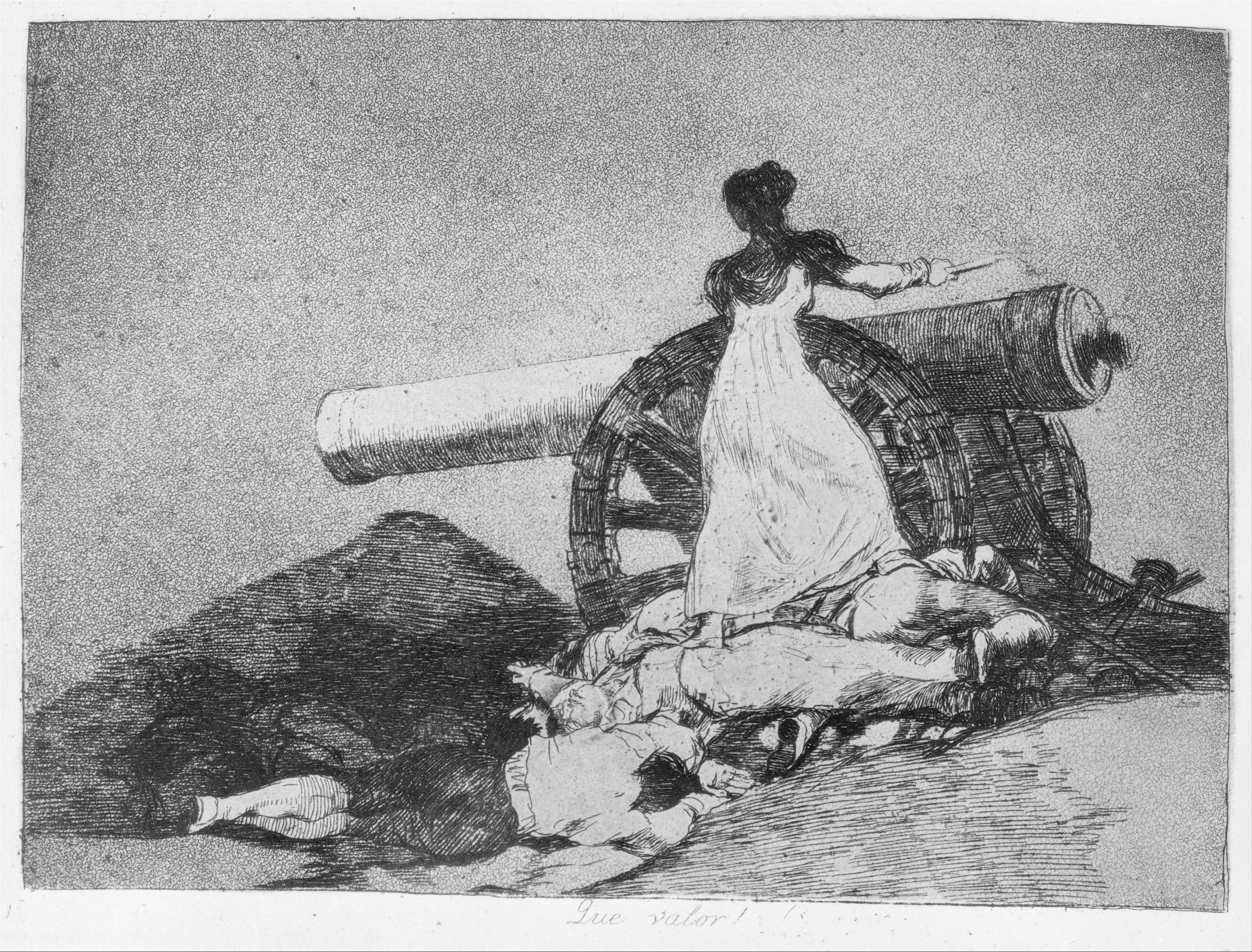
Que valor! – a sketch of Agustina de Aragón by Goya. She manned a cannon alone in the siege of Zaragoza and her bravery rallied the defenders.

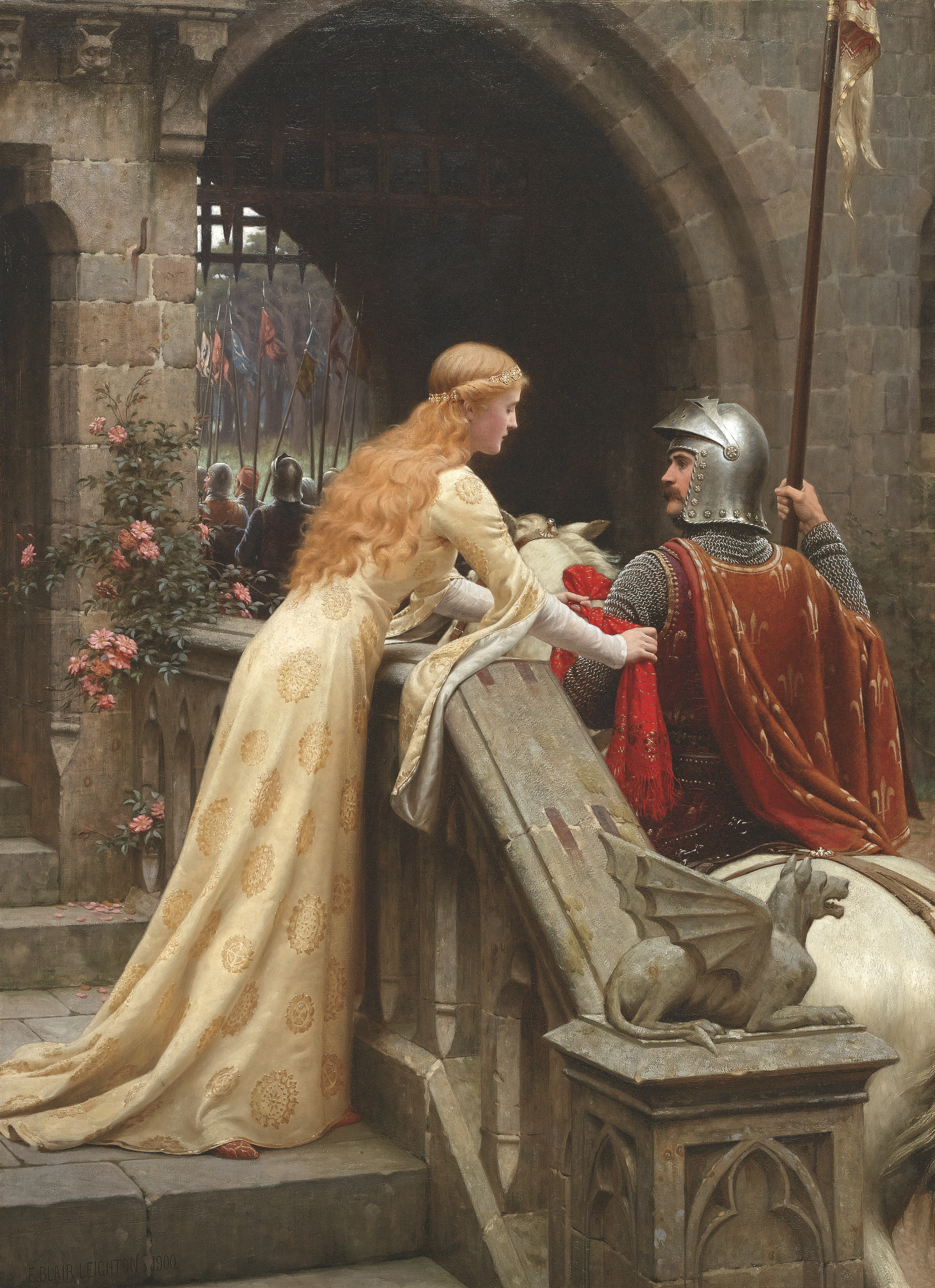
God Speed (1900) by Edmund Leighton

Courage (also called bravery, valour (British and Commonwealth English), or valor (American English)) is the choice and willingness to confront agony, pain, danger, uncertainty, or intimidation. Valour is courage or bravery, especially in battle.

Physical courage is bravery in the face of physical pain, hardship, even death, or threat of death; while moral courage is the ability to act rightly in the face of popular opposition, shame, scandal, discouragement, or personal loss.

The classical virtue of fortitude (andreia, fortitudo) is also translated as "courage", but includes the aspects of perseverance and patience. In the Western tradition, notable thoughts on courage have come from philosophers Socrates, Plato, Aristotle, Aquinas, and Kierkegaard; as well as Christian beliefs and texts.

In the Hindu tradition, mythology has given many examples of courage; with examples of both physical and moral courage exemplified. In the Eastern tradition, the Chinese text Tao Te Ching offers a great deal of thoughts on courage; both physical and moral.

== Characteristics of courage ==
=== Fear and confidence in relation to courage ===
According to Professor Daniel Putman, "courage involves deliberate choice in the face of painful or fearful circumstances for the sake of a worthy goal". With this realization, Putman concludes that "there is a close connection between fear and confidence". Fear and confidence in relation to courage can determine the success of a courageous act or goal. They can be seen as independent variables in courage, and their relationship can affect how we respond to fear. The confidence that is being discussed here is self-confidence; confidence in knowing one's skills and abilities and being able to determine when to fight fear or when to flee it. Putman states that: "The ideal in courage is not just a rigid control of fear, nor is it a denial of the emotion. The ideal is to judge a situation, accept the emotion as part of human nature and, we hope, use well-developed habits to confront the fear and allow reason to guide our behavior toward a worthwhile goal."

According to Putman, Aristotle refers to an appropriate level of fear and confidence in courage. "Fear, although it might vary from person to person, is not completely relative and is only appropriate if it 'matches the danger of the situation'". The same goes for confidence in that there are two aspects to self-confidence in a dangerous situation:

1. "A realistic confidence in the worth of a cause that motivates positive action."
2. "Knowing our own skills and abilities. A second meaning of appropriate confidence then is a form of self-knowledge."

Without an appropriate balance between fear and confidence when facing a threat, one cannot have the courage to overcome it. Professor Daniel Putman states "if the two emotions are distinct, then excesses or deficiencies in either fear or confidence can distort courage". Courage does not mean that you are not afraid, it means that you are willing to face the challenges that lay ahead of you.

=== Possible distortions of courage ===
According to Putman, there are four possible ways courage could be distorted:

1. "Higher level of fear than a situation calls for, low level of confidence". Someone like this would be perceived as a coward only if they let fear stop them from facing the situation, but those who act despite fear would be displaying the virtue of courage at its highest level
2. "Excessively low level of fear when real fear is an appropriate, excessively high level of confidence". Someone like this would be perceived as foolhardy;
3. "Excessively high level of fear, yet the confidence is also excessively high". The third possibility can occur if someone experienced a traumatic experience that brought about great anxiety for much of their life. Then they fear that their experience would often be inappropriate and excessive. Yet as a defensive mechanism, the person would show excessive levels of confidence as a way to confront their irrational fear and "prove" something to oneself or another. So this distortion could be seen as a coping method for their fear.
4. "Excessively low level of fear and low level of confidence". For the last possibility, it can be seen as hopelessness or fatalism.

Thus, Putman identifies fear and courage as being deeply intertwined and that they rely on distinct perceptions: "the danger of the situation", "the worthiness of the cause", "and the perception of one's ability".

== Theories ==
=== Ancient Greece ===
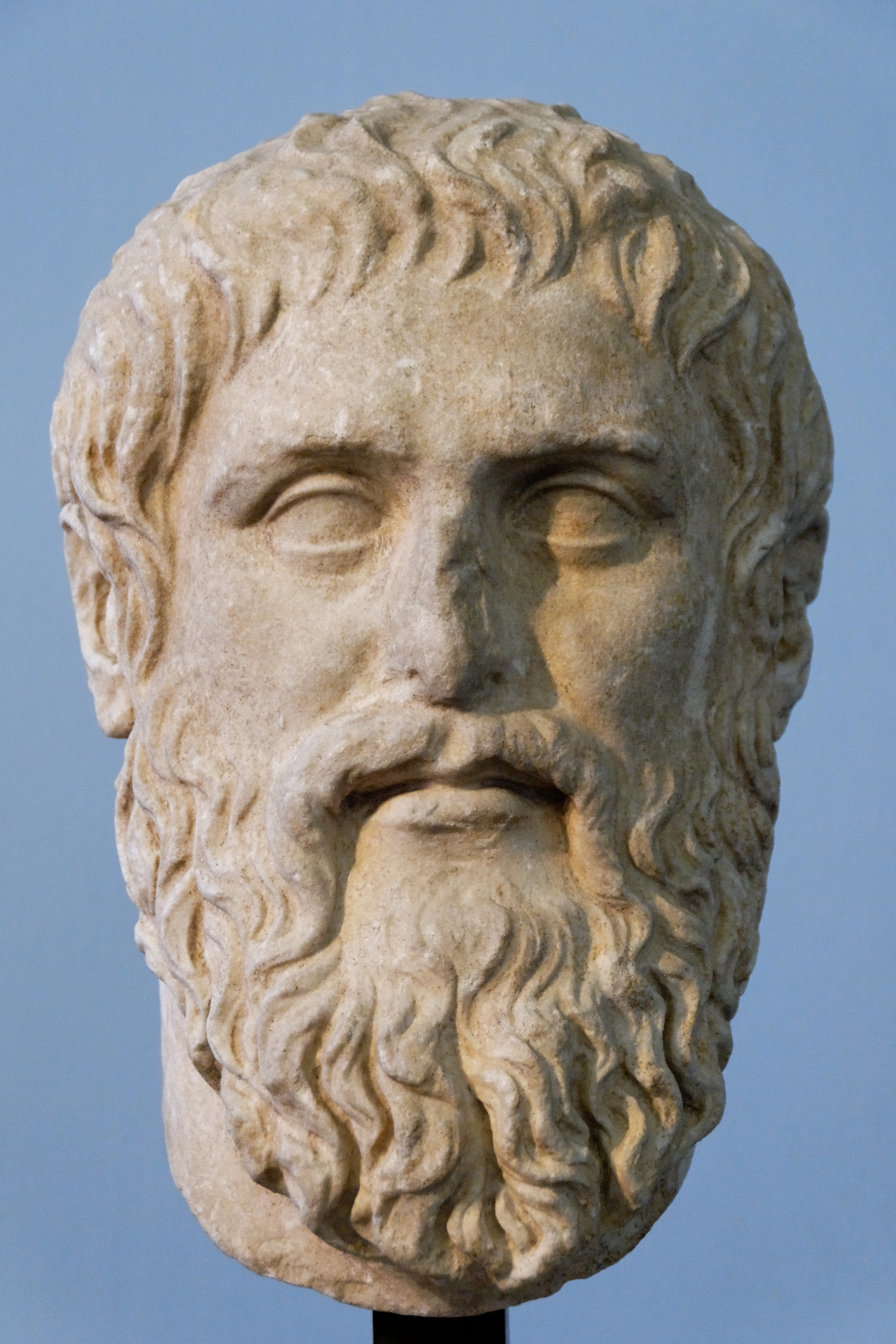
Plato, Musei Capitolini

Plato's Laches discusses courage, but fails to come to a satisfactory conclusion on what courage is. Many definitions of courage are offered, including:

...a man willing to remain at his post and to defend himself against the enemy without running away...

...a sort of endurance of the soul...

...knowledge of the grounds of fear and hope...

While many definitions are given in Plato's Laches, all are refuted, giving the reader a sense of Plato's argument style. Laches is an early Socratic Dialogue, which may be why Plato doesn't reach a clear conclusion. In this early writing, Plato is still developing his ideas and shows influence from his teachers like Socrates.

In The Republic, Plato describes courage as a sort of perseverance – "preservation of the belief that has been inculcated by the law through education about what things and sorts of things are to be feared". Plato explains this perseverance as being able to persevere through all emotions, like suffering, pleasure, and fear.

As a desirable quality, courage is discussed broadly by Aristotle in the context of soldiers in battle for a noble cause. In Nicomachean Ethics, where its absence is the vice of cowardice and its excess the vice of recklessness, courage represents the mean between the two extremes.

Thucydides, a 5th century BCE Greek historian, wrote, "The bravest are surely those who have the clearest vision of what is before them, glory and danger alike, and yet notwithstanding, go out to meet it." (Note: Attributed to Pericles by Thucydides. History of the Peloponnesian War. Translated by Zimmern, Alfred E. II.40.)

=== Ancient Rome ===
In the Roman Empire, courage formed part of the universal virtue of virtus. Roman philosopher and statesman Cicero (106–43 BCE) lists the cardinal virtues but does not name them as such: "Virtue may be defined as a habit of mind (animi) in harmony with reason and the order of nature. It has four parts: wisdom (prudentiam), justice, courage, temperance." However, Cicero held that "a courageous spirit in a human who has not attained perfection and ideal wisdom is generally too impetuous".

=== Western traditions ===
In De Officiis Ministrorum, Ambrose echoes Cicero in holding reservations regarding those who exhibit courage without yet having demonstrated a general moral balance. Ambrose held that fortitude without justice occasions injustice; since the stronger a man is the more ready to oppress the weaker.

Courage is a natural virtue which Augustine of Hippo did not consider a virtue for Christians.

=== Eastern traditions ===
The Tao Te Ching contends that courage is derived from love (慈故能勇) translated as: "From love one gains courage."

In Hindu tradition, Courage (shauriya) / Bravery (dhairya), and Patience (taamasa) appear as the first two of ten characteristics (lakshana) of dharma in the Hindu Manusmṛti, alongside forgiveness (kshama), tolerance (dama), honesty (asthaya), physical restraint (indriya nigraha), cleanliness (shouchya), perceptiveness (dhi), knowledge (vidhya), truthfulness (satya), and control of anger (akrodha).

Islamic beliefs also present courage and self-control as key factors in facing the Devil (both internally and externally). Many have this belief because of the courage the Prophets of the past displayed (through peace and patience), despite there being people who despised them.

=== Modern ===
==== Pre-19th century ====
Thomas Hobbes lists virtues into the categories of moral virtues and virtues of men in his work Man and Citizen. Hobbes outlines moral virtues as virtues in citizens, that is virtues that without exception are beneficial to society as a whole. These moral virtues are justice (i.e. not violating the law) and charity. Courage as well as prudence and temperance are listed as the virtues of men. By this Hobbes means that these virtues are invested solely in the private good as opposed to the public good of justice and charity. Hobbes describes courage and prudence as strengths of mind as opposed to a goodness of manners. These virtues are always meant to act in the interests of individual while the positive and/or negative effects of society are merely a byproduct. This stems forth from the idea put forth in Leviathan that the state of nature is "solitary, poor, nasty, brutish and short" and self-preservation is the most fundamental aspect of behavior. According to Hobbes courage is a virtue of the individual in order to ensure a better chance of survival while the moral virtues address Hobbes's social contract which civilized men display (in varying degrees) in order to transcend the state of nature. Hobbes also uses the idea of fortitude as a virtue. Fortitude is "to dare" according to Hobbes, but also to "resist stoutly in present dangers". This is a more in-depth elaboration of Hobbes's concept of courage that is addressed earlier in Man and Citizen.

David Hume listed virtues into two categories in his work A Treatise of Human Nature: artificial virtues and natural virtues. Hume categorized courage as a natural virtue. In the Treatise's section "Of Pride and Humility, Their Objects and Causes", Hume wrote that courage is a cause of pride: "Every valuable quality of the mind, whether of the imagination, judgment, memory or disposition; wit, good-sense, learning, courage, justice, integrity; all these are the cause of pride; and their opposites of humility".

Hume also wrote that courage and joy have positive effects on the soul: "...since the soul, when elevated with joy and courage, in a manner seeks opposition, and throws itself with alacrity into any scene of thought or action, where its courage meets with matter to nourish and employ it". Along with courage nourishing and employing, Hume also wrote that courage defends humans in the Treatise: "We easily gain from the liberality of others, but are always in danger of losing by their avarice: Courage defends us, but cowardice lays us open to every attack".

Hume considered what excessive courage does to a hero's character in the Treatise's section "Of the Other Virtues and Vices": "Accordingly we may observe, that an excessive courage and magnanimity, especially when it displays itself under the frowns of fortune, contributes in a great measure, to the character of a hero, and will render a person the admiration of posterity; at the same time, that it ruins his affairs, and leads him into dangers and difficulties, with which otherwise he would never have been acquainted".

Other understandings of courage that Hume offered can be derived from Hume's views on morals, reason, sentiment, and virtue from his work An Enquiry Concerning the Principles of Morals.

==== 19th century onward ====
Søren Kierkegaard opposed courage to angst, while Paul Tillich opposed an existential courage to be with non-being, fundamentally equating it with religion:

Courage is the self-affirmation of being in spite of the fact of non-being. It is the act of the individual self in taking the anxiety of non-being upon itself by affirming itself... in the anxiety of guilt and condemnation.... every courage to be has openly or covertly a religious root. For religion is the state of being grasped by the power of being itself.

J.R.R. Tolkien identified a "Northern 'theory of courage'" – the heroic or "virtuous pagan" insistence to do the right thing even in the face of certain defeat without promise of reward or salvation:

It is the strength of the northern mythological imagination that it faced this problem, put the monsters in the centre, gave them victory but no honour, and found a potent and terrible solution in naked will and courage. 'As a working theory absolutely impregnable.' So potent is it, that while the older southern imagination has faded forever into literary ornament, the northern has power, as it were, to revive its spirit even in our own times. It can work, as it did even with the goðlauss Viking, without gods: martial heroism as its own end.

— J. R. R. Tolkien, Beowulf: The Monsters and the Critics

Virtuous pagan heroism or courage in this sense is "trusting in your own strength", as observed by Jacob Grimm in his Teutonic Mythology:

Men who, turning away in utter disgust and doubt from the heathen faith, placed their reliance on their own strength and virtue. Thus in the Sôlar lioð 17 we read of Vêbogi and Râdey â sik þau trûðu, "in themselves they trusted".

Ernest Hemingway famously defined courage as "grace under pressure".

Winston Churchill stated, "Courage is rightly esteemed the first of human qualities because it is the quality that guarantees all others."

According to Maya Angelou, "Courage is the most important of the virtues, because without courage you can't practice any other virtue consistently. You can practice any virtue erratically, but nothing consistently without courage." And C. S. Lewis wrote that "Courage is not simply one of the virtues but the form of every virtue at the testing point, which means at the point of highest reality."

In Beyond Good and Evil, Friedrich Nietzsche describes master–slave morality, in which a noble man regards himself as a "determiner of values"; one who does not require approval, but passes judgment. Later, in the same text, he lists man's four virtues as courage, insight, sympathy, and solitude, and goes on to emphasize the importance of courage: "The great epochs of our life are the occasions when we gain the courage to re-baptize our evil qualities as our best qualities."

According to the Swiss psychologist Andreas Dick, courage consists of the following components:

1. put at risk, risk or repugnance, or sacrifice safety or convenience, which may result in death, bodily harm, social condemnation or emotional deprivation;
2. a knowledge of wisdom and prudence about what is right and wrong in a given moment;
3. Hope and confidence in a happy, meaningful outcome;
4. a free will;
5. a motive based on love.

=== Implicit Theories of Courage ===
Researchers who want to study the concept and the emotion of courage have continued to come across a certain problem. While there are "numerous definitions of courage", they are unable to set "an operational definition of courage on which to base sound explicit theories". Rate et al. states that because of a lack of an operational definition, the advancement of research in courage is limited. So they conducted studies to try to find "a common structure of courage". Their goal from their research of implicit theories was to find "people's form and content on the idea of courage". Many researchers created studies on implicit theories by creating a questionnaire that would ask "What is courage?". In addition, in order to "develop a measurement scale of courage, ten experts in the field of psychology came together to define courage. They defined it as:

the ability to act for a meaningful (noble, good, or practical) cause, despite experiencing the fear associated with perceived threat exceeding the available resources

Also, because courage is a "multi-dimensional construct, it can be "better understood as an exceptional response to specific external conditions or circumstances than as an attribute, disposition, or character trait". Meaning that rather than being a show character or an attribute, courage is a response to fear.

From their research, they were able to find the "four necessary components of people's notion of courage". They are:

1. "intentionality/deliberation"
2. "personal fear"
3. "noble/good act"
4. "and personal risk"

With these four components, they were able to define courage as:

a willful, intentional act, executed after mindful deliberation, involving objective substantial risk to the actor, primarily motivated to bring about a noble good or worthy end, despite, perhaps, the presence of the emotion of fear.

To further the discussion of the implicit theories of courage, the researchers stated that future research could consider looking into the concept of courage and fear and how individual's might feel fear, overcome it and act, and act despite it.

=== "Clinical courage" ===
The term "clinical courage" came to light in relation to modern medicine in the 2000s, mostly in relation to the practice of medicine in remote or resource-limited settings. It has been described as the practice of medicine outside of a clinician's usual scope of practice, or relevant clinical guidelines, in order to provide essential medical care, where no alternative exists. It has been specifically discussed in relation to rural generalists, paramedics, general practitioners, and rural medicine. The opposing theory is that of "clinical recklessness", in which the actions of a clinician in stepping outside of their competence results in unprofessional behaviour, which exposes patients to risk or harm.

== Society and symbolism ==
One symbol often associated with courage is the lion.

== Fortitude ==
Fortitude and courage are distinguishable in that fortitude is the mental or emotional strength that enables courage in the face of adversity. According to Presbyterian theologian William Swan Plumer, "There is also, in strict propriety of language, a difference between courage and fortitude. Courage faces and resists danger; fortitude endures pain.... Courage is for action; fortitude for suffering. In this sense, fortitude differs little from constancy and patient endurance."

Thomas Aquinas says that fortitude ranks third after prudence and justice among the cardinal virtues. He distinguishes fortitude from fearlessness, which can too easily become recklessness through short-sighted audacity with disastrous results. In both Catholicism and Anglicanism, fortitude is also one of the seven gifts of the Holy Spirit.

== Awards ==
Several awards claim to recognize courageous actions, including:

- The Victoria Cross (VC) is the highest military award that may be received by members of the British Armed Forces and the Armed Forces of other Commonwealth countries for valour "in the face of the enemy", the civilian equivalent being the George Cross. A total of 1,356 VCs have been awarded to individuals, 13 since World War II.
- The Medal of Honor is the highest military decoration awarded by the United States government. It is bestowed on members of the United States armed forces who distinguish themselves "conspicuously by gallantry and intrepidity at the risk of his life above and beyond the call of duty while engaged in an action against an enemy of the United States".
- The military crosses of the various branches of the United States armed forces – Army Distinguished Service Cross, Navy Cross, Air Force Cross and Coast Guard Cross – are the second highest military decoration that can be awarded to a member of those branches, awarded for extreme gallantry and risk of life in actual combat with an armed enemy force. Despite their branch related names, an action by any person, from any branch, in support of a branch other than their own, can result in that person being awarded a military cross by, and of, that other branch.
- The Carnegie Hero Fund – was established to recognize persons who perform extraordinary acts of heroism in civilian life in the United States and Canada, and to provide financial assistance for those disabled and the dependents of those killed saving or attempting to save others.
- The Profile in Courage Award is a private award given to people who display courage in a similar way to those John F. Kennedy described in his book Profiles in Courage. It is given to individuals (often elected officials) who, by acting in accord with their conscience, risked their careers or lives by pursuing a larger vision of the national, state, or local interest in opposition to popular opinion or pressure from constituents or other local interests.
- The Civil Courage Prize is a human rights award which is awarded to "steadfast resistance to evil at great personal risk – rather than military valor". It is awarded by the Trustees of The Train Foundation annually and may be awarded posthumously.
- Courage to Care Award is a plaque with miniature bas-reliefs depicting the backdrop for the rescuers' exceptional deeds during the Nazis' persecution, deportation, and murder of millions of Jews.
- The Ivan Allen Jr. Prize for Social Courage is awarded by Georgia Institute of Technology to individuals who uphold the legacy of former Atlanta Mayor Ivan Allen Jr., whose actions in Atlanta, Georgia, and testimony before congress in support of the 1963 Civil Rights Bill legislation set a standard for courage during the turbulent civil rights era of the 1960s.
- The Param Vir Chakra is the highest military award in India given to those who show the highest degree of valour or self-sacrifice in the presence of the enemy. It can be, and often has been, awarded posthumously.
- The Military Order of Maria Theresa, the highest order of the Austro-Hungarian Empire, was awarded for "successful military acts of essential impact to a campaign that were undertaken on [an officer's] own initiative, and might have been omitted by an honorable officer without reproach".
- The Edelstam Prize is awarded for outstanding contributions and exceptional courage in standing up for one's beliefs in the defense of Human Rights. This award is given to those who had the ability to act in complex situations to either save human lives or defend those who are threatened.

== See also ==
- Boldness – Vigour and valour in action
- Bushido – Moral code of the samurai
- Chivalry – Traditional ideology and code of conduct of knights
- Dharma – Key concept in Indian philosophy and Eastern religions, with multiple meanings
- Karma – Concept about individuals' intent and actions influencing those individuals' future
- Moral character – Steady moral qualities in people
- Risk – Possibility of something bad happening
- Virtue – Positive trait or quality deemed to be morally good
- Dutch courage
