= Ivan Allen Jr. Prize for Social Courage =

The Ivan Allen Jr. Prize for Social Courage is an international award established in 2010 by the Georgia Institute of Technology in recognition of the late Ivan Allen Jr. A Georgia Tech alumnus, Allen became a pivotal leader during America's struggle for racial integration during the 1960s. While mayor of Atlanta, Georgia, USA (1962–1970), Allen risked his place in society, his political future, and his life when he testified before the U.S. Senate Commerce Committee in support of what became the Civil Rights Act of 1964.

The Ivan Allen Jr. Prize for Social Courage recognizes individuals who, like Mayor Allen, stand up for moral principles and render service to humanity without regard for personal or professional peril. Recipients positively affect public discourse in spite of the risk to their careers, their livelihoods, and even their lives. The Prize is funded in perpetuity by a grant from the Wilbur and Hilda Glenn Family Foundation. It was awarded for the first time on March 15, 2011, replacing the Ivan Allen Jr. Prize for Progress and Service, which had been awarded from 2001–2010 to prominent Georgians.

== Prize recipients ==
=== 2011: Sam Nunn ===
The first recipient of the Ivan Allen Jr. Prize for Social Courage was Sam Nunn who served as a United States Senator from Georgia from 1972 to 1996.

In 1991, Nunn co-authored the Nunn-Lugar Act, which set up the Nunn-Lugar Cooperative Threat Reduction Program that is credited with aiding former Soviet republics in ridding their territories of nuclear weapons. As of June 2014, the program had contributed to the deactivation of more than 7,600 nuclear warheads, neutralized chemical weapons, safeguarded fissile material, converted weapons facilities for peaceful use, mitigated bio-threats, and redirected the work of former weapons scientists and engineers. Senator Nunn is co-chairman and CEO of the Nuclear Threat Initiative (NTI), a nonprofit, nonpartisan organization that focuses on reducing global threats from weapons of mass destruction.

When announcing Senator Nunn as the recipient of the Ivan Allen Jr. Prize for Social Courage, Georgia Institute of Technology President Peterson stated, “While some individuals talk about achieving world peace, Sam Nunn has actively pursued this vision and created a legacy that continues to reap results long after his exit from public office.” Peterson lauded Nunn for courage and commitment to his own moral compass, for standing up for his beliefs, and for enacting meaningful and sustainable solutions for making the world a better, and more peaceful place.

=== 2012: William H. Foege ===
In March 2012, William H. Foege was honored as the second recipient of the Ivan Allen Jr. Prize for Social Courage. An American epidemiologist, Foege is best known as the architect of the surveillance and containment strategy that successfully eradicated the smallpox virus. He has also overseen, through leadership in the CDC, The Carter Center, and the Task Force for Child Survival (now the Task Force for Global Health), the eradication of Guinea worm disease, polio, and measles, and the elimination of river blindness. At times risking his own health and safety, Dr. Foege's efforts have brought about extraordinary progress across an astonishing breadth of health issues, literally saving millions of lives. Speaking about Foege's merit in receiving the Prize, Jacqueline J. Royster, Dean of the Georgia Institute of Technology Ivan Allen College of Liberal Arts said, “Like former Atlanta Mayor Ivan Allen Jr., Dr. Foege has envisioned a better world and created communities for realizing that dream in the face of seemingly insurmountable problems. His courage to do the right thing and his steadfastness, sometimes in the face of staunch opposition, has saved millions of lives and reshaped the global dialogue about what is possible in health and social progress.” Georgia Tech President Peterson also commented. “Dr. Foege’s ability to develop and implement innovative health strategies has alleviated much human suffering in our world today and for generations to come. It is our privilege to honor Dr. Foege for his deep moral commitment to humanitarian progress and his lifetime of service through Georgia Tech’s Ivan Allen Prize for Social Courage.” Upon receiving the Prize, Foege said, “I use the occasion also to encourage everyone to believe that the health situation in the world is both dire and correctable. It takes hope and action, and absolute tenacity.”

=== 2013: John Lewis ===
On April 3, 2013, Congressman John Lewis, an icon of American Civil Rights was honored as the third recipient of the Ivan Allen Jr. Prize for Social Courage.

Lewis was one of the "Big Six" leaders of the Civil Rights Movement. He was the keynote speaker for the 1963 March on Washington, of which he was a core architect. Lewis' impact on civil rights for African-Americans has included advocating for desegregation laws and voters’ rights. A founding member and president of the Student Nonviolent Coordinating Committee (SNCC), Lewis planned and led many of their activities. His personal courage was first evident when he led student sit-ins that resulted in the public accommodation of African-Americans at Nashville restaurants. He was one of the original 13 Freedom Riders who challenged legally sanctioned segregation on interstate buses. Despite repeated attacks on his dignity, physical beatings, and arrests, Lewis has remained staunchly committed to nonviolent work for social change throughout his life.

"I always did what I could do to help other people," Lewis said at the ceremony while reflecting on his role in the civil rights movement. "I wanted to make a difference in order to meet the pressing need of people left out or left behind. I was inspired to find a way to a 'new way.' And this inspires me today, as I continue to keep pushing on." Georgia Tech President G.P. "Bud" Peterson said, "Congressman Lewis made his mind up to accomplish many things throughout his lifetime, and his accomplishments will transcend generations. He has dedicated his life to protecting human rights, securing civil liberties, and building what he calls 'The Beloved Community' in America. His unflinching civil rights leadership and ongoing advocacy for social change throughout his career have elevated the cause of human rights around the world."

=== 2014: Beatrice Mtetwa ===
Prominent human rights attorney Beatrice Mtetwa has been named recipient of the Ivan Allen Jr. Prize for Social Courage, an award given to individuals who, by asserting moral principle, have positively affected public discourse at the risk of their careers, livelihoods, and sometimes lives.

The Ivan Allen Jr. Prize for Social Courage will be presented to Beatrice Mtetwa during a ceremony on the Georgia Tech campus on November 13, 2014. The presentation of this 2014 award is especially significant as Mtetwa, an advocate for women's equality and advancement, will be the first woman to receive the prize. It also comes at a time when government leaders in Zimbabwe are persecuting human rights defenders such as Mtetwa.

=== 2016: Nancy Parrish ===
Humanitarian activist. Founder of Protect Our Defenders.

=== 2017: Jimmy and Rosalynn Carter ===
Former Governor of Georgia and President of the United States; former First Lady of Georgia and First Lady of the United States. Jimmy Carter had previously won the Ivan Allen Jr. Prize for Progress and Service in 2002.

=== 2018: Andrew Young ===
Ambassador for human rights. Former Mayor of Atlanta, Ambassador to the United Nations, and Member of the House of Representatives.

=== 2020: Charlayne Hunter-Gault and Hamilton E. Holmes ===
Georgia groundbreakers. Awarded posthumously to Hamilton E. Holmes; ceremony was attended by his family.

=== 2021: Anthony Fauci ===
Public health champion. Former Director of the National Institute of Allergy and Infectious Diseases and Chief Medical Advisor to the President.

=== 2022: Georgia Tech's Trailblazers ===
Ford C. Greene (posthumous), Ralph A. Long Jr., Lawrence Williams, and Ronald Yancey.

=== 2023: Christiane Amanpour ===
CNN's chief international anchor, who was cited by the award as "a fearless and uncompromising interviewer who has put her life in danger to give a voice to victims of war."

=== 2024: Justice Robert Benham ===
Former justice of the Supreme Court of Georgia. Championed civil liberties and actively pushed forward integration in his hometown.

=== 2025: María Corina Machado ===
A political leader of Venezuela who advocated for democracy and social change. She was forced into hiding after being prohibited from leaving the country by the Maduro government.

=== 2026: José Andrés ===
A chef, author, educator, and award-winning TV personality. Andrés founded World Central Kitchen in response to the 2010 Haitian earthquake. The group has since responded to disasters around the world, providing food and meals to damaged and otherwise inaccessible communities.

== Prize history ==
The Ivan Allen Jr. Prize for Social Courage was established in 2010 by the Georgia Institute of Technology. The international award honors individuals whose life and work embody the moral courage personified by former Atlanta Mayor Ivan Allen Jr. The Prize underscores the Institute's mission to improve the human condition by recognizing those around the globe who, like Mayor Allen, have risked everything to stand up for moral principle and have made a positive difference in the world.

The Prize is funded in perpetuity by a grant from the Wilbur and Hilda Glenn Family Foundation.

The prize's forerunner was the Ivan Allen Jr. Prize for Progress and Service, which was awarded annually from 2001 to 2010 by the Georgia Tech.

== Nominating committee ==
=== About the committee ===
The nominating committee is responsible for assessing candidates who meet the requirements of the prize, demonstrating social courage in adverse circumstances. Each year after deliberation, the committee submits a nominee to the president of the Georgia Institute of Technology, who makes the final selection.

=== Voting members ===
Joseph R. Bankoff, chair, President & CEO, Woodruff Arts Center; Susan E. Eisenhower, Chairman Emeritus, The Eisenhower Institute, United States Department of Energy, Blue Ribbon Commission on America's Nuclear Future; Dr. Helene D. Gayle, President and CEO, CARE U.S.A.; Dr. Kenneth J. Knoespel, McEver Professor of Engineering and the Liberal Arts, Georgia Institute of Technology; Charles H. McTier, Retired President, Robert W. Woodruff Foundation; The Honorable Sam Nunn, former U.S. Senator from Georgia, Co-chairman & CEO, Nuclear Threat Initiative, chairman, Center for Strategic and International Studies (CSIS), Co‐Chairman, Euro‐Atlantic Security Initiative (EASI), faculty member, The Sam Nunn School of International Affairs, Georgia Institute of Technology; Dr. Catherine Ross, Director and Harry West Chair, Center for Quality Growth & Regional Development, College of Architecture Georgia Institute of Technology; Dr. Jacqueline Jones Royster, Dean, Ivan Allen College of the Liberal Arts, Georgia Institute of Technology; William J. Todd, Professor of the Practice, Ernest Scheller College of Business, Georgia Institute of Technology

=== Non-voting members ===
Inman Allen, Former Chairman, Allen Workspace, Atlanta, Georgia; Marta H. Garcia, Assistant Vice President for Development, Georgia Institute of Technology, Atlanta, Georgia

== Award ceremony ==
Presentation of the Ivan Allen Jr. Prize for Social Courage takes place on the Georgia Tech campus. The Symposia and festivities highlight research, teaching, endeavors, and innovation that address global challenges related to Mayor Allen's legacy and the work of the recipient.
