= Helene D. Gayle =

American pediatric and humanitarian

Helene Gayle
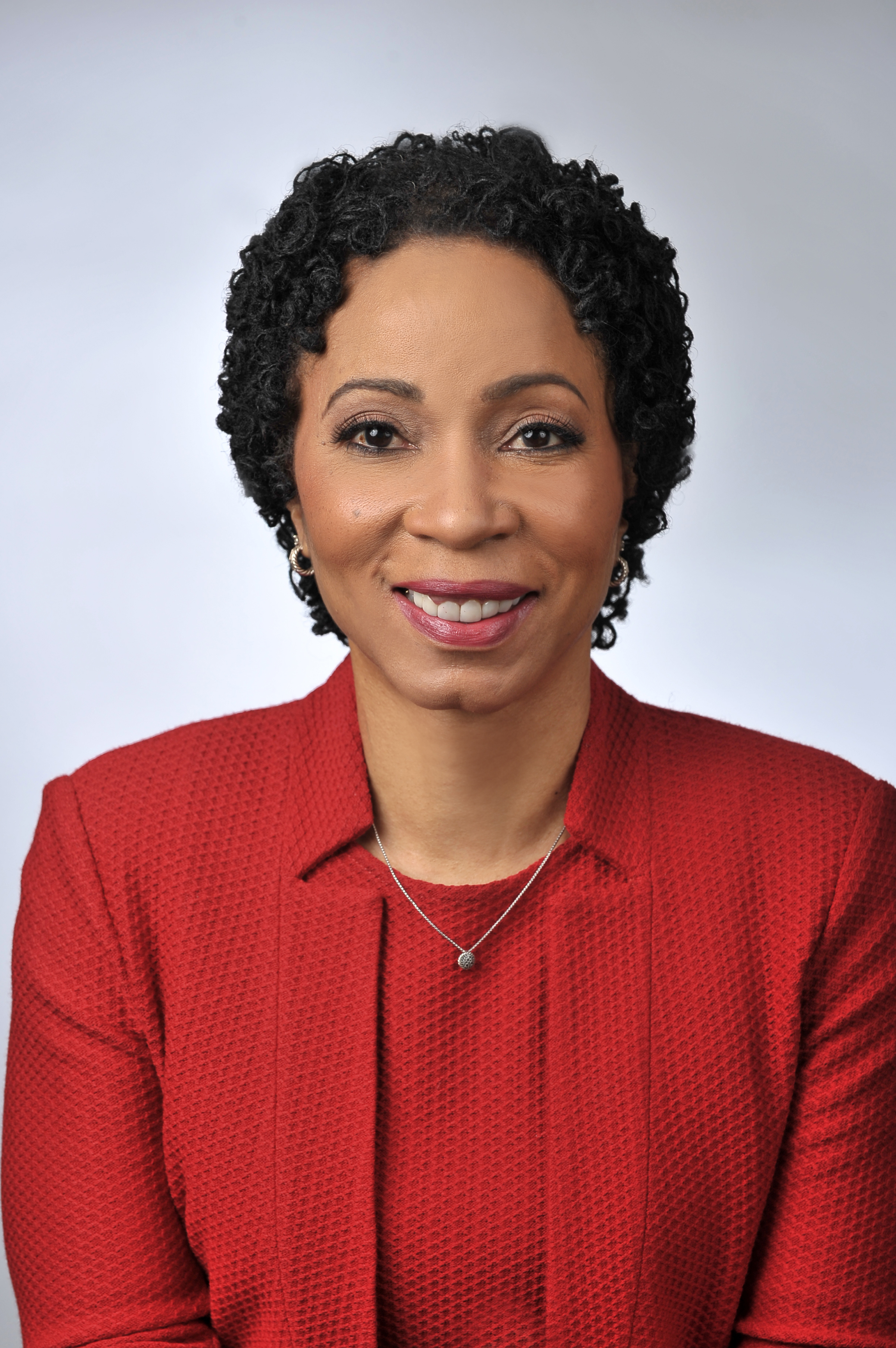
- Helene Gayle, 2018

President of Spelman College
- In office July 1, 2022 – November 26, 2024; On leave: October 18, 2024 – November 26, 2024
- Preceded by: Mary Schmidt Campbell
- Succeeded by: Rosalind Brewer (acting)

Personal details
- Born: August 16, 1955 (age 70) Buffalo, New York, U.S.
- Spouse: Stephen Keith
- Education: Columbia University (BA); University of Pennsylvania (MD); Johns Hopkins University (MPH)

Helene D. Gayle (born August 16, 1955) is an American physician, and academic and non-profit administrator. She was president of Spelman College until 2024. She formerly was CEO of the Chicago Community Trust, one of the nation's leading community foundations. Earlier in her career she was the director of international humanitarian organization CARE, and spent much of her career in the field of public health research in epidemiology at the CDC.

== Early life and education ==
Helene Gayle was born in Buffalo, New York, to Jacob Astor Gayle, a small-business owner, and Marietta Spiller Dabney Gayle, a social worker. She attended Court Street Elementary School and Lancaster Middle School in Lancaster, New York, and in Buffalo, graduated with honors from Woodlawn Junior High School and Bennett High School (Class of 1972). After high school, Gayle attended Baldwin-Wallace College and Barnard College of Columbia University, from which she received a B.A. degree with honors in psychology in 1976. She earned an M.D. at the University of Pennsylvania School of Medicine and an M.P.H. at Johns Hopkins University School of Hygiene and Public Health (now the Bloomberg School).

Gayle is board certified in pediatrics, having completed a residency in pediatric medicine at Children's National Medical Center in Washington, D.C. Gayle completed a second residency in preventive medicine at the Centers for Disease Control and Prevention.

== Career ==
Beginning in 1984, Gayle spent 20 years with the Centers for Disease Control and Prevention (CDC), focusing on global health and infectious disease prevention and control, especially HIV/AIDS. On assignment from CDC from 1992 to 1994, Gayle was the AIDS coordinator and chief of the HIV/AIDS Division at the United States Agency for International Development (USAID). In 1995, she was appointed as the first director of the newly created National Center on HIV, TB and STD Prevention (NCHSTP). During that time, she was named an Assistant Surgeon General and Rear Admiral in the United States Public Health Service.

Initially on loan from the CDC, she directed the HIV, TB, and Reproductive Health Program at the Bill & Melinda Gates Foundation from 2001 to 2006. During her 5 years as director, she was responsible for research, policy, public awareness, and programs on HIV/AIDS, TB, STDs and reproductive health around the world.

Gayle was president and CEO of the international humanitarian organization CARE from 2006 to 2015. She led efforts to empower girls and women around the world to bring lasting change to poor communities. Under her leadership, CARE strengthened its focus on advocacy efforts and policy work to have a long-term impact on reducing poverty across the globe. Under her leadership, Gayle introduced signature programs that focused on financial inclusion, maternal health and improving girls' access to quality primary education.

From 2015 to 2017, Gayle was president and CEO of McKinsey Social Initiative (now McKinsey.org), a nonprofit that brings together diverse stakeholders to address complex global social challenges.

In 2017, Gayle became CEO of the Chicago Community Trust (the Trust), one of the nation's oldest and largest community foundations. Under her leadership, the trust adopted a new strategic focus on closing the racial and ethnic wealth gap in the Chicago region. The three-part strategy to close this gap centers around growing household wealth, catalyzing neighborhood investment and building collective power. Gayle is recognized internationally as an expert on health, global development, and humanitarian issues. She was named one of Forbes' "100 Most Powerful Women," one of NonProfit Times' "Power and Influence Top 50," and of Chicago Magazine's "Chicago's 50 Most Powerful Women." She been featured by media outlets like The New York Times, The Washington Post, ForbesWoman, Glamour, O magazine, National Public Radio, and CNN.

Gayle has received 18 honorary degrees and held affiliate and adjunct faculty appointments at the University of Washington and Emory University She has published numerous scientific articles on global and domestic public health issues, poverty alleviation, gender equality, and social justice.

On July 1, 2022, Gayle began her tenure as president of Spelman College, succeeding Mary Schmidt Campbell. In 2024, she resigned as Spelman president.

On May 23, 2024, Gayle was among the guests invited to the state dinner hosted by U.S. President Joe Biden in honor of President William Ruto at the White House.

== Other activities ==
=== Corporate boards ===
- Palo Alto Networks, Effective May 25, 2021
- Coca-Cola, 2013 – present
- Colgate-Palmolive Board, 2010 – present

=== Non-profit organisations ===
- Center for Strategic and International Studies Board of Trustees, 2007 – present
- ONE Board, 2006 – present
- Rockefeller Foundation Board of Trustees, 2009 – present
- Brookings Institution, 2015–present
- New America, 2013 – present
- Federal Reserve Bank of Chicago, Board Chair, 2019 – 2022
- Economic Club of Chicago, 2019 –
- Inter-American Dialogue, 2018 – present

=== Professional society memberships ===
- Council on Foreign Relations
- Institute of Medicine
- Delta Omega Society
- American Public Health Association
- National Medical Association
- American Medical Women's Association
- Society for Public Health Education

== Recognition ==
=== Honorary degrees ===
- American University, Doctor of Science, 2018
- Xavier University of Louisiana, Doctor of Science, 2016
- University of Buffalo, Doctor of Science, 2016
- University of Miami, Doctor of Science, 2013
- Oberlin College, Doctor of Science, 2011
- Colby College, Doctor of Humane Letters, 2010
- Columbia University, Doctor of Laws, 2009
- Agnes Scott College, Doctor of Science, 2009
- Brandeis University, Doctor of Humane Letters, 2008
- Morehouse School of Medicine, Doctor of Science, 2008
- Mount Sinai School of Medicine of New York University, Doctor of Humane Letters, 2008
- Duke University, Doctor of Science, 2008
- Meharry Medical College, Doctor of Science 2007
- Smith College, Doctor of Science, 2007
- Pennsylvania State University, Doctor of Science, 2004
- Jackson State University, Doctor of Humane Letters, 2004

=== Awards and honors ===
- Teachers College, Columbia University, Medal for Distinguished Service, 2018
- Johns Hopkins University Society of Scholars, inducted 2017
- American Public Health Association Presidential Citation Award, 2015
- WNBA Inspiration Award, 2015
- Jimmy and Rosslyn Carter Humanitarian Award, National Foundation for Infectious Diseases, 2012
- Forbes Magazine 100 Most Powerful Women, 2014
- The NonProfit Times Power and Influence Top 50, 2011
- Bryn Mawr College, Katharine Hepburn Award, 2011
- AARP Inspire Award, 2010
- Bennett High Alumni Honor Roll, 2010
- Georgia State University, Ethics Advocate Award, 2009
- Business to Business Magazine, Women of Excellence Award, 2009
- 100 Most Influential Atlantans Award, 2009
- Ivan Allen College, Georgia Institute of Technology, Ivan Allen Jr. Prize for Social Courage, 2009
- South African Partners, Desmond Tutu Award, 2009
- Morehouse College, Coca-Cola Leadership Award, 2008
- Americans for Informed Democracy, Innovator in International Development Award, 2008
- Cable Positive, Humanitarian of the Year Award, 2008
- Wall Street Journal, "50 Women to Watch", 2006
- Eleanor Roosevelt Val-Kill Medal, 2006
- Helen H. Jackson, Woman of Valor Award, 2006
- Arthur Ashe Institute for Urban Health, Leadership in Global Medicine Award, 2005
- Women of Color, Health Science & Technology Awards: Medical Leadership in Industry, 2002
- National Medical Association, Scroll of Merit Award, 2000
- Women Looking Ahead, Inc., The Women Looking Ahead (WLA) 100s List Award, 1999
- 100 Black Men of America, Inc., Woman of the Year Award, 1999
- U.S. Department of Health and Human Services, Secretary's Award for Distinguished Service, 1999, 2001
- Atlanta Business League, Women of Influence Award, 1998
- Public Health Service Foreign Duty Award, 1997
- Public Health Service Meritorious Service Medal, 1996
- Columbia University Medal of Excellence, 1996
- National Coalition of 100 Black Women, Inc., Service Award, 1999
- Who's Who Among Black Americans, 1990, 1993 and 1994
