= Maata Wharehoka =

New Zealand nurse, weaver, Māori arts advocate and Parihaka leader

- Born: December 22, 1950
- Died: February 22, 2025 (aged 74)
- Occupations: Nurse, weaver, community leader
- Known for: Māori health campaigns, raranga
- Spouse: Te Ru Koriri Wharehoka
- Awards: Creative New Zealand Ngā Tohu ā Tā Kingi Ihaka award

Maata Wharehoka (22 December 1950–22 February 2025) was a New Zealand nurse, weaver, Māori arts advocate and Parihaka leader. She was a voluntary euthanasia advocate.

Wharehoka was affiliated with Ngāti Tahinga, Ngāti Koata, Ngāti Apakura, Ngāti Toa and Ngāti Kuia.

== Career ==
Wharehoka began her career as a nurse, during which she wrote the first stop smoking programme targeted at Māori women. She became an advocate of kahu whakatere tūpāpaku, traditional Māori practices surrounding death, and voluntary euthanasia. She publicly spoke about the latter and her own chronic illness during the enactment of the End of Life Choice Act in 2021.

She was considered a renowned practitioner of raranga, Māori weaving.

She worked closely with the Govett-Brewster Art Gallery, providing guidance to the institution and presenting at public events. She also collaborated with and hosted many artists, including Tracey Benson, Te Wai Hohaia, Pinaree Sanpitak, Lafin Sawmah, Eleng Luluan, Akac Orat and Malay Makakazuwan, Hawaiian collective Ho’okuleana, and Sorawit Songsataya.

Her collaboration with Australian media artist Tracey Benson continued over many years with the 2022 short film The silence: Puanga honouring their continuing dialogue.

In recognition of her contributions to the arts, Wharehoka was awarded the Creative New Zealand Ngā Tohu ā Tā Kingi Ihaka award in 2015.

Wharehoka acted as the caretaker of Te Niho O Te Atiawa, a Parihaka marae, for almost 30 years until her death. She organised the 2017 International Women's Peace Walk in Wellington, leading a workshop in poi-making.

== Key exhibitions ==
- Fibrous Soul, a collaboration with Sorawit Songsatya at Govett-Brewster Art Gallery, March 2–June 16, 2024.
