= Ivan Allen Jr. Prize for Progress and Service =

Prior to the Ivan Allen Jr. Prize for Social Courage, the Georgia Institute of Technology's Ivan Allen College of Liberal Arts had awarded the Ivan Allen Jr. Prize for Progress & Service. Awarded annually from 2001-2010, the Prize honored individuals who had contributed to the progress of American civilization through his or her service to a field or profession associated with the academic disciplines taught in the Ivan Allen College.

== List of recipients ==
2001: Zell Miller

- Out-spoken U.S. Senator, nationally acclaimed governor, best-selling author, and university professor; Zell Miller is one of the most colorful and controversial political figures in America today. He was awarded the first Ivan Allen Jr. Prize for Progress and Service for his leadership in creating the HOPE scholarship program, which provides free college tuition for every high school graduate with a B average and a voluntary statewide pre-kindergarten program for all four-year-olds in the state of Georgia.

2002: Jimmy Carter

- Former U.S. President and Georgia Governor Jimmy Carter is an alumnus of Georgia Tech ('46). Since he left the presidency in 1981, President Carter has headed the Carter Presidential Library and Center at Emory University, where he is University Distinguished Professor. Awarded the Ivan Allen Jr. Prize for Progress and Service in 2002, he received the Nobel Peace Prize a year later for his lifetime of commitment to the nonviolent resolution of conflict.

2003: Molly Ivins

- A nationally syndicated columnist, Ms. Molly Ivins was one of a handful of journalists over the past few decades who had developed both a uniquely individual and a uniquely female voice on national and international affairs. She was the first woman to receive the Ivan Allen Prize for Progress and Service.

2004: Sam Nunn

- As co-chairman and chief executive officer of the Nuclear Threat Initiative (NTI), Sam Nunn works to reduce the global threats from nuclear, biological and chemical weapons. He brings to this mission his extensive experience as a U.S. Senator from Georgia for 24 years (1972-1996).

2005: Will Wright

- Co-Founder and Chief Product Designer of Maxis, Will Wright is most recognized as having been involved in creating some of the most significant landmarks in electronic entertainment. His game, Sim City, involving simulated cities, taught a generation to think about cities as complex systems and The Sims, a “life” simulator is the bestselling game of all time, selling over 20 million copies.

2006: Jesse Hill, Jr.

- As an executive and CEO of the largest African-American owned financial institution in America, he built upon the company's strong tradition of supporting human and civil rights activism. Over the course of his career, Hill has compiled a long list of “door-opening firsts” for African-Americans.

2007: Charles & Lessie Smithgall

- Charles and Lessie Smithgall. Their gift to name the college was hardly the first or the last that Charles and Lessie Smithgall bestowed on Georgia Tech, Atlanta, and the State of Georgia. All told, they have contributed more than $20 million in property and money over the course of their lifetimes, which has had an extraordinary impact upon both the natural and built environment.
- The prize was awarded posthumously for the first time in 2007, inasmuch as Charles Smithgall died in 2000. And in also honoring his widow, Lessie Smithgall, as co-recipient, the 2007 Allen Prize breaks precedent again in being the first award made to a couple.

2008: Ted Turner

- Ted Turner—media visionary and mogul, business entrepreneur, champion sportsman, and legendary philanthropist. With this award, the College sought to recognize not only Turner's past contributions as a businessman to the progress of Atlanta, but also his service to the nation and the world as one of the most influential philanthropists of the 20th century.

2009: Helene D. Gayle

- Helene D. Gayle is president and CEO of CARE USA. An internationally recognized expert on health, development and humanitarian issues, she decided early in her profession to focus on matters of social justice and equity.

2010: William J. Todd

- William J. Todd spent his entire 38-year career in Atlanta in healthcare and technology management. He currently serves Professor of the Practice/Executive Director for Healthcare Initiatives at Georgia Tech Scheller College of Business and was previously President and CEO of the Georgia Cancer Coalition, a strategic public-private initiative to move Georgia to the leading ranks of cancer care in the nation. The Coalition has invested over $300 million in programs, projects, and initiatives in Georgia institutions to support research and prevention efforts to reduce cancer deaths in the state.
