= Flower of Life =

Flower of Life may refer to:

- Flower of Life (geometry), a hexagonal pattern of overlapping circles
- Flower of Life (manga), a Japanese manga series
- Flower of Life, a 2016 installation by Eleng Luluan
- Flower of Life (memorial), a Russian memorial that is part of the Green Belt of Glory
- Flower of Life, a 2003 album by Emyli
- The Flower of Life, a 2013 album by Cocaine 80s
- "Flower of Life (Chaos by Design)", a song by Forbidden from their 2026 album Forbidden
- Flower of Life, a fictional flower in the television series Super Dimension Cavalry Southern Cross and Robotech
- Flower of Life, a fictional flower in the manga series Nurse Angel Ririka SOS
