= Amanda Murdie =

American political scientist

Amanda Murdie is an American political scientist who is the dean of the Georgia Institute of Technology's Ivan Allen College of Liberal Arts and is a Regents' Professor. She was previously a Regents' Professor & Georgia Athletic Association Professor of International Affairs in the School of Public and International Affairs at the University of Georgia.

Murdie specializes in the behavior of international nongovernmental organizations (INGOs) and their interactions with states, local populations, and intergovernmental organizations. She has published over 80 articles and books in numerous academic journals including the American Political Science Review.

== Education ==
Murdie earned a B.S. and M.A. in political science from Kansas State University. Subsequently, she obtained a Ph.D. in political science from Emory University, studying international conflict and International Political Economy.

== Career ==
In June of 2025, Murdie succeeded Richard Utz as the dean of the Ivan Allen College of Liberal Arts.

After assistant professorships at Kansas State University and the University of Missouri, Murdie took up the post of associate professor at the University Missouri. Subsequently, she became a full professor at the University of Georgia.

She serves on the editorial boards of the International Relations journals Foreign Policy Analysis and International Studies Perspectives.

In 2015, she served as the president of the International Studies Association Midwest, and was the program chair for the 2016 International Studies Association Annual Convention.

Murdie is an expert in the role of INGOs in international affairs, human security, human rights, conflict processes, and development.

In September 2014, her first book was published in 2014 by Stanford University Press. Help or Harm: The Human Security Effects of International NGOs examines how international NGOs effectively improve human security.

Murdie has served as a consultant for the International Council of Voluntary Agencies and was chosen to be the keynote speaker for their annual conference in 2016.

Awards

- Karl Deutsch Award, International Studies Association (ISA)
- Frank J. Klingberg Award for Best Paper (with Shanshan Lian), International Studies Association (ISA)
- Quincy Wright Distinguished Scholar Award, International Studies Association (ISA)
- William L. Stamey Award for Excellence in Teaching at Kansas State University
