= Ivan Allen Jr. =

American businessman and politician (1911–2003)

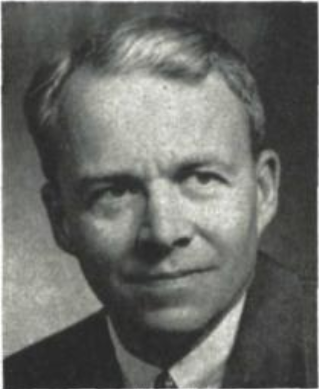
- Allen in 1952

52nd Mayor of Atlanta
- In office 1962–1970
- Preceded by: William B. Hartsfield
- Succeeded by: Sam Massell

Personal details
- Born: Ivan Earnest Allen Jr. March 15, 1911 Atlanta, Georgia, U.S.
- Died: July 2, 2003 (aged 92) Atlanta, Georgia, U.S.
- Party: Democratic
- Education: Georgia Institute of Technology (BS)
- Known for: Ivan Allen Jr. Prize for Social Courage

Military service
- Allegiance: United States of America
- Branch/service: United States Army
- Years of service: 1942–1945
- Rank: Major
- Battles/wars: World War II

Ivan Earnest Allen Jr. (March 15, 1911 – July 2, 2003) was an American businessman who served two terms as the 51st mayor of Atlanta, during the Civil Rights Movement of the 1960s.

Allen took the helm of the Ivan Allen Company, his father's office supply business, in 1946 and within three years had the company bringing in annual revenues of several millions of dollars. In 1961, he authored a white paper for revitalizing Atlanta. It was adopted by the Atlanta Chamber of Commerce and became the Six Point Forward Atlanta program. This plan would become his roadmap as mayor for creating an economic surge that established the infrastructure, business, education, arts, sports, and international presence that are the foundations for modern Atlanta. Allen was a founding member of Atlanta's influential Commerce Club, which he chaired until his death in 2003. He became president of the city Chamber of Commerce in 1961 and during this same year ran for mayor, defeating the staunch segregationist, Lester Maddox.

Convinced that the South could never thrive economically under segregation, Allen supported the demands of African Americans for their accommodation at public facilities. On his first day in office, he ordered the removal of all "white" and "colored" signs from facilities in city hall. Racial alliances forged by Allen with Martin Luther King Jr. and others in the African American community, along with his advocacy for the public accommodation of African Americans in the white community, allowed Allen to guide Atlanta through the turbulence of racial integration without the violence that occurred in many southern cities. In a key address to the public, he asked Atlantans to eliminate racial segregation and in doing so, to set an example to inspire "all the world". At the behest of President John F. Kennedy, Allen testified before Congress on behalf of what became the Civil Rights Act of 1964. He was the only white southern politician of significance to do so. After his testimony, Allen and his family were under death threats and required police protection for a year.

== Early life ==
Ivan Earnest Allen Jr. was born in Atlanta on March 15, 1911, the only son of Ivan Allen Sr. (1876–1968) and Irene Beaumont Allen (1889–1972). His father, Allen Sr., was co-founder of the Ivan Allen Company (1900), an office supply and furniture store that, by 1925, had about fifty employees and was one of Atlanta's best-known businesses. Allen Sr. was also a founding member of the Atlanta Rotary Club, served as president of the new Atlanta Convention Bureau (1913–1917), president of the Atlanta Chamber of Commerce (1917), served two years as a senator in the Georgia state legislature (1918–1919), and was the treasurer of the Georgia Democratic Party in 1936. In an effort to attract northern capital to Atlanta, Allen Sr. headed the Atlanta chamber's "Forward Atlanta" booster campaign (1926–1929), a strategy that lured almost 700 new businesses to Atlanta and helped influence Allen Jr.'s future as a businessman and civic leader.

From an early age, Allen understood that his family was privileged. He began attending Boys High School in 1927 and was one of the few students to own a car. That same year, his father's name was published for the first time in the Social Cities Register, an annual list of elites in Richmond, Atlanta, Charleston, Savannah, and Augusta. He regularly attended the First Presbyterian Church of Atlanta with his parents and would later serve as an elder for many years and remain an active member until his death.

== Education ==
Initially an indifferent student, Allen asserted himself during his last year at Boys High, earning a spot on the honor roll. In 1929, he enrolled in the School of Commerce at the Georgia Institute of Technology. During his first year at Georgia Tech, he was one of only five students in the student body of about two thousand to make straight A's. He graduated cum laude in 1933, with a Bachelor of Science in Commerce. While at Georgia Tech, he served as president of the student body, vice president of the Inter-Fraternity Council, cadet colonel of the ROTC, president of Omicron Delta Kappa, vice-president of ANAK, president of the Georgia Phi chapter of the Sigma Alpha Epsilon fraternity, was a member of the Honor Roll, and a member of the Dean's List.

At one point, he led a student protest against Governor Eugene Talmadge when the board of regents abolished the School of Commerce at Tech and moved it to the University of Georgia. During one summer as a college student he served as postmaster, strung tennis rackets, and worked as a counselor for young campers at Camp Greenbriar in Alderson, West Virginia. He was paid $500 and invested this money in Coca-Cola stock, of which he wrote was "my first investment and probably the greatest I ever made".

== Business career ==
After graduating from Georgia Tech in 1933 during the depths of the Great Depression, Allen refused offers from other companies and began his lifetime of work in the family business, which was at the time called the Ivan Allen–Marshall Company. That summer, he worked in the basement of the business, learning from a black employee named Arthur Wright and earning $100 per month. At the time, the business consisted of one Atlanta store and grossed $196,000.

In 1936, he married Louise Richardson, granddaughter of Hugh T. Inman, and member of one of the most prominent families in Atlanta. He continued working at the company until he was called to the army to serve in World War II from 1942 to 1945.

After the War, he worked in the Georgia State Capitol from the fall of 1945 until the spring of 1946. In March 1946, Allen Sr. asked his son to return to the family business, in light of the fact that his partner, Charles Marshall, was in poor health and had decided to retire. Allen resigned from his position as executive secretary to the governor and became president his father's company in 1946. In 1948, Marshall died and willed his half of the Ivan Allen–Marshall Company to Allen Jr., giving the Allen family ownership of the firm. By 1949, the firm had more than two hundred employees and annual revenues of several million dollars. Together with his father, he changed the name to the Ivan Allen Company in 1953. The company would flourish over the next four decades under his leadership and that of his late son, Ivan Allen III, becoming the region's preeminent office supplies and furniture dealer, with 17 offices across the South.

Ivan Allen Jr. was president of Ivan Allen Company from 1946 to 1970 and chairman from 1970 to 1995. In 1988, the Ivan Allen Company boasted $116 million in revenues. In 1999, the supplies division of the Ivan Allen Company was sold to Staples, Inc. The furniture division, now known as Ivan Allen Workspace, is headed by his son, Iman Allen.

== Political and civic involvement ==
In 1936, Allen actively campaigned for Georgia Governor Eurith D. Rivers, serving in a number of state-government positions during the Rivers administration between 1936 and 1940. As treasurer of the State Hospital Authority, he raised $2.5 million by passing the state's first revenue certificate bond issue to rebuild the white section of the old state mental hospital at Milledgeville.

When Pearl Harbor was struck in late 1941, he was called into the army as a reserve officer. During World War II, he served as a supply officer and directed the field division of the Selective Service System in Georgia for the United States Army. He entered the service in 1942 as a second lieutenant and was discharged in 1945 as a major.

When the War ended, an old college friend who was also the progressive young Governor of Georgia, Ellis Arnall, went to Washington and asked the Secretary of Defense to release Allen from his duties. Allen was discharged and immediately became executive secretary to Governor Arnall until March 1946. He was later chief of staff for Governor M.E. Thompson (1947–1948).

While working at Ivan Allen–Marshall Company, he began to participate in civic affairs, such as the Boy Scouts and the Community Chest. He served as a member of the state Board of Education and the state Department of Veteran Services. He was a director of the Bank of Georgia, a trustee at the Georgia Tech Research Institute, an executive board member of the state's Family Welfare Society and of the Atlanta YMCA, president of the Young Democrats Club of Georgia, and president of the Atlanta Improvement Association (1951).

For almost ten years, he led the state Chamber of Commerce in industrial development projects. With friends Mills B. Lane, Jack Glenn, Philip Alston, Richard Rich, Lawrence Gellerstedt Jr., and others, he founded The Commerce Club, which served as a venue for business networking and hospitality. He served as chairman until his death.

Allen was an active member of the Atlanta Rotary Club from 1939 until his death. He served as president of the Community Chest and United Way, president of the Atlanta Area Council of the Boy Scouts of America, and president of the Georgia Chamber of Commerce. In 1947, he was selected to head the Community Chest fund drive, during which time he became the first white member of the Community Chest leadership to attend the opening fundraising dinner for the black division of the Community Chest. In 1958, he served as a member on the Atlanta Citizens Advisory Committee on Urban Renewal. He was elected president of the Atlanta Chamber of Commerce in 1960 and, in 1961, proposed the Six Point Forward Atlanta program, which became the cornerstone of his platform in his successful campaign for mayor in 1961.

== Bids for governor ==
In 1954, Ivan Allen Jr. made a brief bid for Georgia Governor on a segregationist platform. In a field of nine candidates, he lost to segregationist Marvin Griffin.

In 1957, Allen resigned from his position as president of the Georgia State Chamber of Commerce, hired a press agent, and delivered speeches across Georgia as a potential candidate for the 1958 Gubernatorial Election. Again, he ran on a segregationist platform, but emphasized the "peace and tranquility necessary to continue our economic development program".

In December 1957, he announced that he would not be a candidate for governor. He alluded to the fact that no Atlantan in forty years had won the race for governor, mostly as a result of rural Georgian apprehension towards the leaders from the "large, liberal cities". Allen wrote, "As a businessman I have analyzed the market and found that I am not a saleable product...No matter how clear and unequivocal I made my support of segregation, I was still from Atlanta".

== Mayoralty ==
In 1961, he ran for Mayor of Atlanta against Lester Maddox, a 45-year-old restaurant owner and staunch segregationist. Allen was carried to victory by 63,522 votes, while Maddox received 35,922 votes. Allen gained much of his support from the black community, which made up 40 percent of the city's population at the time. He took office in early 1962, replacing outgoing Atlanta Mayor William B. Hartsfield, who was retiring after 23 years in office.

In June 1962, during his first term as mayor, Allen took the solemn responsibility of flying to France to help identify and bring home the bodies of 106 of Atlanta's art and business leaders who, on an art appreciation tour, died in the Air France Flight 007 plane crash at Orly Airport in Paris. Many of the deceased had been personal friends of Allen.

In his book, Allen wrote about going to Paris immediately after the crash:

"I realized how insignificant I was, but I knew I had to assume the posture of representing these families and, indeed, the entire city of Atlanta, Georgia. I knew nothing about protocol, foreign relations, aviation, international agreements, or any of the other details I might become involved in. I was nothing but the Mayor of Atlanta and a friend and neighbor of 106 people who had been killed at this same airport only the day before...These were my lifelong friends. This was my generation. This was also the backbone of Atlanta's cultural society, the city's leading patrons of the arts. There was no precedent for this kind of agony".

In 1965, Allen made a very private commitment to himself and to his wife Louise that he would not seek a third term in office. This was not revealed to the public until January 1969, when Allen formally announced his decision at a meeting of the Atlanta Rotary Club. That year, he refused to publicly endorse any particular candidate in the mayoral race, until just days before the runoff between Sam Massell and Rodney Cook, when reports surfaced suggesting that Allen's vice-mayor and mayoral-elect, Massell, had abused his power as vice-mayor through misuse of the Atlanta Police Department. On the Sunday before the election, Allen called for a press conference and asked Massell to immediately withdraw from consideration "for an office which requires intuitive integrity and instinctive withdrawal from even the suspicion and appearance of evil." Despite the backlash he received, Allen wrote, "Had my candidate, Rodney Cook been involved in the same affair I am convinced I would have taken the same action – except... I would have gone into greater detail to make the public fully understand the seriousness of the situation". Sam Massell went on to win the election and succeed Allen as the 53rd mayor of Atlanta.

=== Economic development of Atlanta ===
Under Mayor Allen's Forward Atlanta program, the city's population grew more than 30 percent. Atlanta ranked in the top ten in the nation in downtown construction, with more than 55 new buildings constructed and 22,000 new jobs created each year. In 1969, Atlanta's unemployment rate at one point plummeted to an astonishing 1.9 percent. Eleven of the city's twelve tallest buildings were constructed during the sixties, and the Atlanta International Airport (now Hartsfield-Jackson Atlanta International Airport), acquired its first direct international air routes and saw its ranking change from the tenth-busiest airport in the nation to the third-busiest. In an attempt to manage the city's vast increase in traffic, Allen oversaw the early phases of construction of the Interstate 285 perimeter and the Downtown Connector, and presided over the creation of the Metropolitan Atlanta Rapid Transit Authority (MARTA), which would take over the old Atlanta Transit system and build the MARTA rail system.

The $13 million Memorial Arts Center (now the Woodruff Arts Center) was established as a memorial to the victims of the 1962 Orly plane crash. The $10 Million Atlanta Civic Center and the $100 million Peachtree Center complex were all built during Allen's mayoralty. Between 1965 and 1969, convention business in Atlanta doubled, with 400,000 delegates spending $60 million.

Mayor Allen also played a key role in bringing Major League Sports to Atlanta. In a politically risky move, he backed the construction of the $18 million Atlanta-Fulton Stadium, which attracted the Milwaukee Braves baseball team in 1965, the new NFL franchised Falcons football team in 1966, and the St. Louis Hawks basketball team arrived in 1968 Local Black leaders criticized him for demolishing a Black neighborhood to build it.

His building program, with its emphasis on developing downtown, was opposed by some of Atlanta's black leaders as not adequately meeting the need for low-income housing. Despite the criticisms, however, there was more low-income housing built during Allen's eight years as mayor than the entire thirty years prior to that. Allen wrote, "It is wonderful to be idealistic and to speak about human values, but you are not going to be able to do one thing about them if you are not economically strong. If there is any one slogan I lived by as mayor of Atlanta, that would be it".

=== Civil rights and desegregation ===
Allen had initially been a segregationist. However, his business pragmatism led him to become an advocate for African American rights. He believed that to flourish, Atlanta must address its racial issues. Eventually, however, Allen was deeply affected by daily, firsthand dealings he faced with racial issues, as well as the profound questions African American citizens posed to him about their humanity and the cultural system that refused to recognize them. His pragmatic support of racial integration transformed rapidly into a conviction about the moral rightness of racial equality – a belief would lead Allen to place himself at the center of a firestorm.

Even before becoming mayor, Allen was involved in efforts to bring desegregation to Atlanta for the sake of Atlanta's businesses and city image. As president of the Atlanta Chamber of Commerce, he worked closely with Judge A.T. Walden, longtime African-American leader; Opie Shelton, vice-president of the Atlanta Chamber of Commerce; and 25 owners and managers of Atlanta's leading department, variety, and chain stores to come to an agreement of the full desegregation of downtown stores and lunch counters.

On his first day in office, he ordered all "white" and "colored" signs removed from City Hall and desegregated the cafeteria. This was the first of many steps he took to advance integration. Allen authorized black Atlanta policemen to arrest whites, hired the city's first black firefighters, and quickly put Atlanta ahead of every other city in the South as far as hiring black workers for positions "other than the most menial jobs". He painstakingly negotiated agreements for the accommodation of African Americans at 18 private and public facilities including hotels, swimming pools, and restaurants. Many Atlanta restaurants and other public facilities desegregated by mutual agreement between their owners and Mayor Allen before the passing of the Civil Rights Act of 1964. By January 1964, 14 major Atlanta hotels and motels had publicly pledged to accept reservations regardless of race."I wasn't so all-fired liberal when I first moved into City Hall", Allen wrote. "But when I saw what the race-baiters were doing or could do to hold back the orderly growth of Atlanta, it infuriated me and eventually swung me to the extreme end opposite them".

Despite his claims to have been committed to integration one of his first actions was to erect a fence to separate a black neighborhood from a white neighborhood. In the face of criticism Mayor Allen refused to take it down until a court order forced him to. The event was known as "Atlanta's Berlin Wall" or "the Peyton Road Affair."

In 1966, a riot broke out in Summerhill, a neighborhood south of the Atlanta Stadium, when a white police officer shot a black resident. Mayor Allen rushed to the scene of the riot, climbing a police car in an attempt to talk to and calm the crowd. He toppled from the car, uninjured, when the crowd repeatedly rocked the vehicle. Afterwards, he walked the streets – refusing to wear a riot helmet as the police did – urging the black residents to "please go home." "This is a good city", he shouted. "Help keep it that way, and go home". In his 1973 autobiography, The River of No Return, Cleveland Sellers a leader in the Student Nonviolent Coordinating Committee claimed that Allen then instructed police to, "get them out of here, if you have to tear it down brick by brick," referring to their homes.

=== Dr. Martin Luther King Jr. ===
Mayor Allen challenged members of Atlanta's prestigious Commerce Club to accept African American businessmen. When Martin Luther King Jr. won the Nobel Peace Prize in 1964, Allen helped organize a 1,500-person bi-racial banquet to honor him (Atlanta was King's hometown). Furthermore, he shamed many of the white leaders in the city into supporting the event beyond pragmatic grounds. Many attended the dinner, making it a turning point in Atlanta's race relations.

Upon hearing that Martin Luther King Jr. had been shot in Memphis, Mayor Allen immediately rushed to the support of Dr. King's wife. Allen and his wife were with Mrs. King when it was confirmed that Dr. King was dead. Two days after Dr. King's assassination on April 4, 1968, he participated in a march across the west side of Atlanta, leading the way in a police car for the nearly four thousand black students walking in memory of Dr. King. Along with Atlanta's police chief, Herbert Jenkins, he visited every black neighborhood in Atlanta during the traumatic days between Dr. King's death and his funeral, walking up and down the streets and reassuring the black community. Mayor Allen went to great lengths to ensure the city remained peaceful when nearly two hundred thousand people gathered to mourn Dr. King's death. King's widow, Coretta Scott King, honored Allen with the Martin Luther King Jr. Nonviolent Peace Prize in 1981.

=== Testimony before Congress ===
"I was convinced now that voluntary desegregation of public facilities, worked out on a local level, had gone as far as it was going to go in the South and much of the rest of the United States....", Allen wrote. "It was obvious that the President was going to have to push through a very plain and airtight law that would, once and for all, abolish the practice of segregation. And segregation, as I intended to say in my testimony, was 'the stepchild of slavery'".

In 1963, President John F. Kennedy made a direct request asking Ivan Allen Jr. to testify before the U.S. Congress in support of a federal law mandating public accommodations for African Americans. This law, particularly directed at those [restaurants and hotels] in the South that continued to close their doors to blacks by arguing private property rights, would force any private business, however remotely involved in interstate commerce, to open its doors to every person regardless of race. Against the counsel of even Atlanta's most prominent black leaders, Allen chose to go to Washington and deliver his testimony, knowing it would most likely ruin his political career and deeply affect his personal and business relationships. Nevertheless, with the support of his wife and very few others, Allen risked his place in society, his political future, the safety of his family, and ultimately his life to advocate the public accommodation of African Americans.

On July 26, 1963, Allen spoke before the U.S. Congress and the nation in support of what became the Civil Rights Act of 1964. He was the only prominent white southern elected official to do so. As a result, there were death threats made towards the Allen family, and many white friends and constituents never spoke to him again. Just one month after Allen's testimony, Dr. Martin Luther King Jr. delivered his "I Have a Dream" speech, also calling for racial equality and an end to discrimination, later proving to be a very defining moment in the Civil Rights Movement.

Excerpts from Allen's testimony were published in newspapers the day after he spoke in front of Congress: "I am firmly convinced that the Supreme Court insists the same fundamental rights must be held by every American citizen. Therefore, any failure by Congress to pass the [Civil Rights] bill would amount to an endorsement of private business setting up an entirely new status of discrimination throughout the nation... I submit that it is not right to allow an American's citizenship to be changed merely as a matter of convenience.... I want to emphasize again that now is the time for legislative action. We cannot dodge this issue. We cannot look back over our shoulders or turn the clock back to the eighteen-sixties. We must take action now to assure a greater future for our citizens and our country.... Now the elimination of segregation, which is slavery's stepchild, is a challenge to all of us to make every American free in fact as well as in theory..."

Allen described that to be the moment which made civil rights a very personal matter to him: "I have to be honest with myself and admit that up until the time I had to make the decision to go to Washington or not go, my liberalism on the race issue had been based to a large degree on the pragmatism: it was simply good business for Atlanta to be an open city, a fair city, a "City Too Busy to Hate", a city trying to raise the level of its poorest citizens and get them off the relief roles...I am certain that at this point I had finally crossed over and made my commitment on a very personal basis. And I think I took some of my friends with me".

Allen continued to engage racial issues throughout his eight years in office. He worked closely with Martin Luther King Jr. and the Southern Christian Leadership Conference. By the time he stepped down, Atlanta was at the forefront of progress in public accommodations, school desegregation, voting rights, housing, and employment. Black citizens occupied positions on the city board of aldermen and the board of education.

== Family ==
Ivan Allen Jr. married Louise Richardson Allen (1917–2008), granddaughter of the influential Atlanta businessman, Hugh T. Inman, on New Year's Day in 1936. They were married for sixty-six years before Allen's death. They had three sons, Ivan Allen III (1938–1992), Hugh Inman, and Beaumont (1951–2014). At the time of Allen Jr.'s death, he was survived by his wife, sons Hugh Inman and Beaumont, daughters-in-law Margaret (Mrs. Ivan Allen III), Tricia (Mrs. Hugh Inman Allen) and Sally (Mrs. Beaumont Allen), seven grandchildren, and four great-grandchildren.

== Georgia Institute of Technology ==
Ivan Allen Jr. graduated in the top five students of his class at Georgia Tech (Commerce, 1933). He was president of the Student Body and the Sigma Alpha Epsilon fraternity, to which he offered lifelong support. For many years, he hosted the annual Ivan Allen Rush Party for his fraternity in the meadow behind his home. In 1990, the liberal arts college at Georgia Tech was renamed the Ivan Allen College of Liberal Arts.

== The Ivan Allen Jr. Prize for Social Courage ==
Entrusted by the Allen family to carry forward Mayor Allen's legacy, Georgia Tech's Ivan Allen College of Liberal Arts awarded the Ivan Allen Jr. Prize for Progress and Service from 2001 to 2010. In 2010, Georgia Tech established the Ivan Allen Jr. Prize for Social Courage. Awarded for the first time in 2011, it recognizes those around the world whose life and work embody Mayor Allen's moral imperative and compassion in shaping a better future for humankind.

== Legacy ==
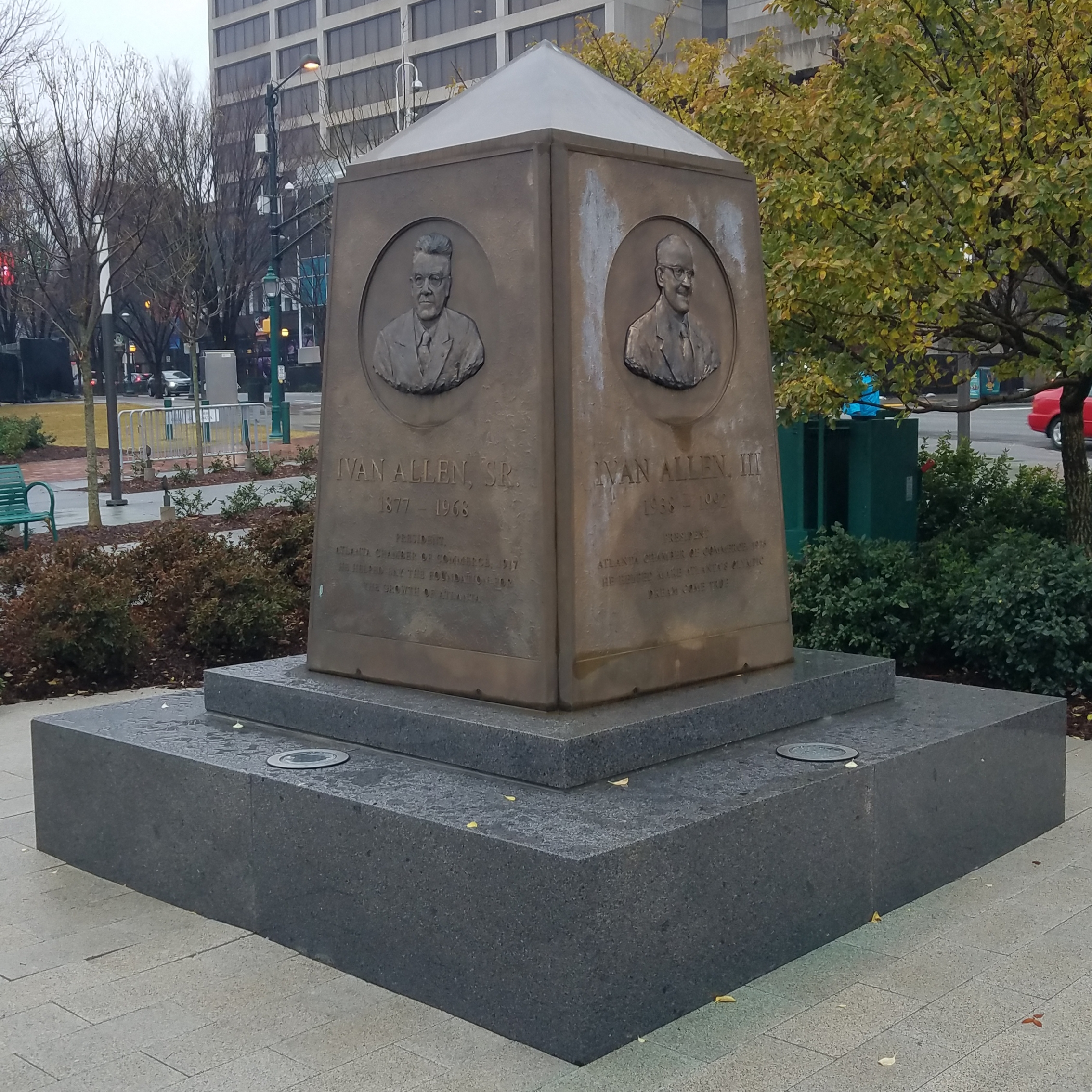
Allen family statue at Centennial Olympic Park

After Allen's death on July 2, 2003, at the age of 92, he was buried at Westview Cemetery in Atlanta. His remains were reinterred at Oakland Cemetery alongside other family members in 2009.

Ivan Allen Jr. was awarded a Doctor of Public Service degree from Georgia Tech and honorary Doctor of Laws degrees from Morris Brown College, Juniata College, Clark College, Morehouse College, LaGrange College, Emory University, and Davidson College.

He was also awarded the Lyndon Baines Johnson Foundation Award for achievement in urban affairs in 1974, the Martin Luther King Jr. Nonviolent Peace Prize in 1981, the Shining Light Award in 1995, and was inducted into the International Civil Rights Walk of Fame at the Martin Luther King Jr. Historic Site in Atlanta, Georgia in 2004 (cite). In 1999, The Commerce Club created the Ivan Allen Jr. Leadership Award, which is presented annually.

A memorial statue of Ivan Allen Sr., Ivan Allen Jr., and Ivan Allen III was commissioned for the Olympic Games and stands in Centennial Olympic Park, adjacent to the Atlanta Chamber of Commerce headquarters. The Atlanta Braves' museum and hall of fame at the now-demolished Turner Field was named in his honor.

His commitment to urban transformation founded in social justice became a cornerstone of the Ivan Allen College of Liberal Arts at Georgia Tech. G. P. "Bud" Peterson, president of Georgia Tech, stated, "He was a leader while he was a student here at Georgia Tech, and went on to be a leader in everything he did throughout his career. Now, half a century later, his life is a beacon of light for those of us following in his footsteps. It is our goal here at Georgia Tech to take the legacy of Ivan Allen Jr. and pass it on to the next generation." Research, teaching, and public service in the Ivan Allen College of Liberal Arts are grounded in Mayor Allen's values and principles.

== Books ==
In 1971, Ivan Allen Jr. published his first and only book, "Mayor: Notes on the Sixties", with Paul Hemphill. The inside cover of the book reads, "To my father, who saw it coming; and to my wife, whose advice and courage saw me through it."

The members of the Ivan Allen family, along with former mayor Maynard Jackson (Dobbs Family), are the subjects of the book, "Where Peachtree Meets Sweet Auburn", published in 1996 by Gary M. Pomerantz.

In 1928, Ivan Allen Sr. published his first and only book, "Atlanta From the Ashes". In the Foreword, Allen Sr. writes, "It is the author's intention in this volume to present his city to the executives of American business." A 1929 New York Times article referred to the book: "Picture of Rise After Sherman's March Is Told In a New Descriptive Book."

Preceded by William B. Hartsfield	Mayor of Atlanta; January 1962 – January 1970	Succeeded by Sam Massell
