= Sam Nunn School of International Affairs =

International affairs school of Georgia Tech

Coordinates: 33.773948°N 84.404353°W

- Type: Public
- Established: 1990
- Parent institution: Georgia Institute of Technology
- Location: 781 Marietta Street NW; Atlanta, Georgia, USA
- Affiliations: APSIA
- Website: www.inta.gatech.edu

The Sam Nunn School of International Affairs, at the Georgia Institute of Technology located in Atlanta, Georgia is one of the first professional schools of international affairs situated at major technological institution. Founded in 1990, the School was renamed the Sam Nunn School of International Affairs in 1996 in honor of former US Senator and Georgia Tech alumnus Sam Nunn.

The School's programs focus on understanding the global context of advances in science and technology and on preparing students to address concerns at the nexus of science, technology, and international affairs. The Sam Nunn School of International Affairs is a member of The Association of Professional Schools of International Affairs (APSIA), an organization that works to advance international understanding, prosperity, peace and security through professional education in international affairs.

== Degree programs ==
Currently the Sam Nunn School offers three undergraduate degree programs including the B.S. degree in International Affairs, which places emphasis on strategic planning and analysis skills. In partnership with School of Modern Languages and the School of Economics in Georgia Tech’s Ivan Allen College, the Sam Nunn School also offers a B.S. in International Affairs and Modern Language, with concentrations in French, German, Japanese, and Spanish, and the B.S. in International Affairs and Economics. The school offers a master's degree in International Affairs that allows participating students interdisciplinary work in economics, management, public policy, computer science, engineering, and other fields. The school also offers an International Affairs, Science and Technology Doctoral Degree.

=== Minors and Certificates ===
- International Affairs (Minor)
- International Affairs (Certificate)
- Asian Affairs (Certificate)
- European Affairs (Certificate)
- Scenarios, Models and Military Games (Certificate)
- Latin American Affairs (Certificate)

== Research ==
The Nunn School's faculty conducts research in a wide range of fields including international political economy, comparative politics, and international security policy. In addition, faculty members possess strong regional expertise in East Asia, Europe, and Latin America. The Nunn School also hosts a variety of programs that allow close interaction with scholars and practitioners of international affairs.

=== Research Centers, Institutes and Policy Programs ===
- Center for International Strategy, Technology and Policy
- Center for European and Transatlantic Studies
- Jean Monnet Centre of Excellence
- Sam Nunn Security Program
- Georgia East Asia Research Schools (GEARS) is a three-university consortium (Emory University, Georgia Institute of Technology, Georgia State University)

== Study Abroad Programs ==
The Sam Nunn School encourages its students to participate in at least one study abroad experience while in the program. The School sponsors summer programs on European economic integration and security institutions in Brussels, Belgium; on China's transition to a market economy in Shanghai, China; on democratization, privatization, and regional economic integration in Buenos Aires, Argentina and Brazil; on the political economy of development in Valencia, Spain; and on environmental politics and development in Costa Rica.
