= The First Graduate =

Bronze sculpture in Georgia, United States

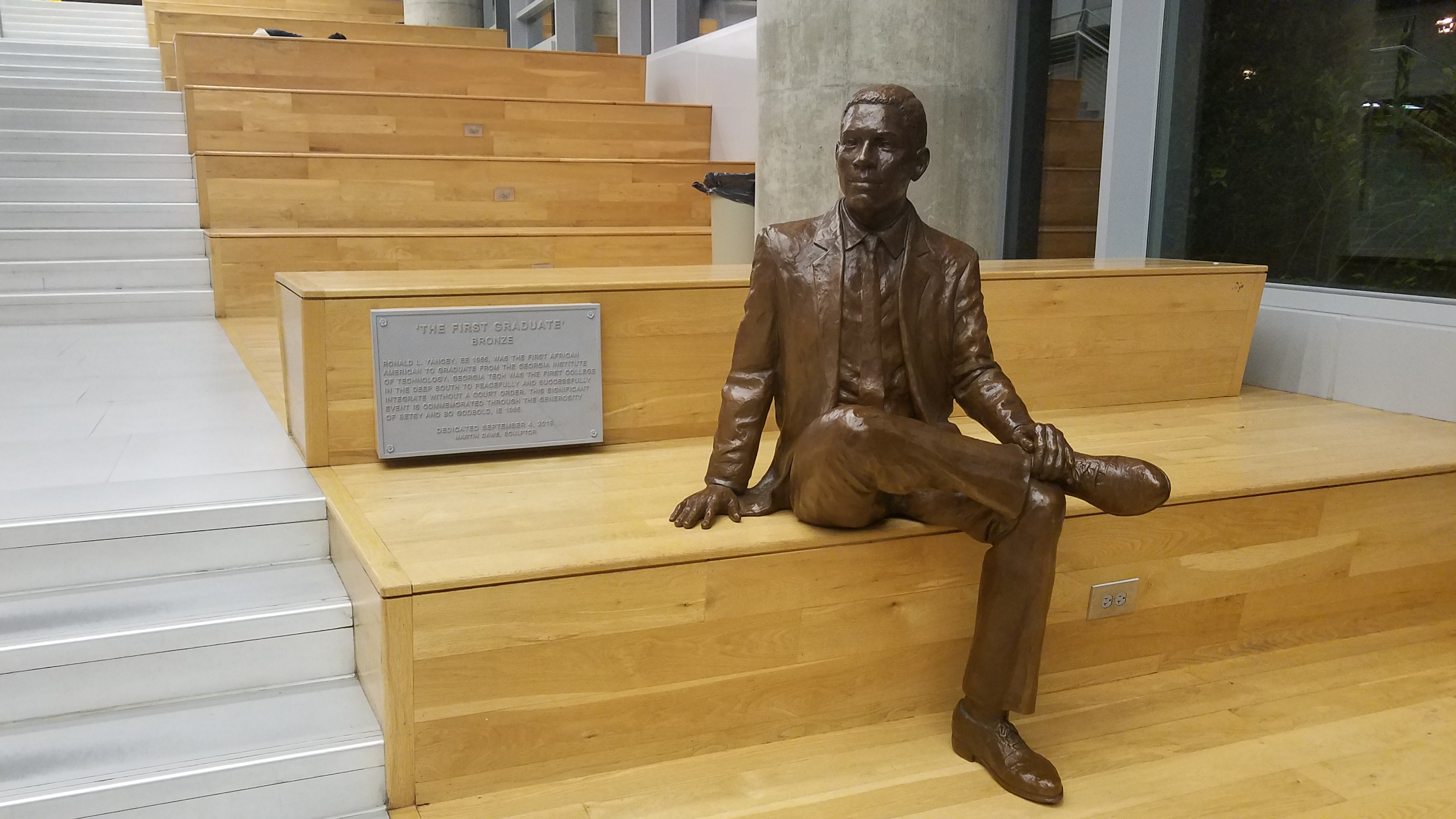
- The First Graduate (2019)
- Artist: Martin Dawe
- Completion date: September 4, 2019
- Medium: Bronze
- Subject: Ronald Yancey
- Location: Clough Undergraduate Learning Commons, Georgia Tech, Atlanta, Georgia, United States

The First Graduate is a bronze sculpture at the Georgia Institute of Technology (Georgia Tech). Unveiled in 2019, the statue was designed by Martin Dawe and honors Ronald Yancey, the first African American student to graduate from the institute. The sculpture is located inside the Clough Undergraduate Learning Commons.

== Description ==
In 1961, the Georgia Institute of Technology admitted Ford C. Greene, Ralph A. Long Jr., and Lawrence Williams as the first African American students at the institute. Several years later in 1965, Ronald Yancey would become the first African American student to graduate from the Georgia Tech. On September 4, 2019, two statues were unveiled at Tech's main campus which honored these individuals. Collectively referred to as the Trailblazers statues, they were designed by Martin Dawe and included The First Graduate, honoring Yancey and The Three Pioneers, honoring Greene, Long, and Williams. While The Three Pioneers is located in Harrison Square, a small park on Tech's campus, The First Graduate is located inside the Clough Undergraduate Learning Commons.

== See also ==
- 2019 in art
