= Johann Eyfells =

Icelandic artist (1923–2019)

Jóhann Eyfells
- Born: 21 June 1923; Reykjavík, Kingdom of Iceland
- Died: 3 December 2019 (aged 96); Fredericksburg, Texas, U.S.
- Education: Master of Fine Arts
- Known for: sculptor
- Spouse: Kristín Halldórsdóttir (m. 1949; died 2002)
- Children: 1

Jóhann Eyfells (21 June 1923 – 3 December 2019) was an Icelandic artist.

Originally trained as an architect, Jóhann worked as a professor of art at the University of Central Florida in Orlando from 1969 until his retirement from university teaching in 1999.

The son of the noted Icelandic landscape painter Eyjólfur J. Eyfells (1886–1979) Jóhann Eyfells had been showing his work at international venues since the 1960s.

The source of his inspiration and the love of his life was his late wife, fellow artist and painter Kristín Halldórsdóttir (1917–2002), a former Icelandic model and dress designer, who he met in California and married on 26 September 1949. Together they attended the University of Florida in Gainesville where Jóhann earned his Bachelor of Architecture degree in 1953 and where he took a Master of Fine Art degree in sculpture in 1964.

Jóhann began creating his abstract sculptures in the early 1960s based on experiments in chemistry and physics, utilizing the interaction of the various inherent and transformative properties of metals, especially aluminum, iron and copper. His art often conceptual in approach. His use of materials varied between metal, wood, paper, cloth, and latex rubber.

Jóhann's creative drive was to document the interaction between time, space and gravity. His work is based on the concepts of receptualism, a theory he developed to explain the essence of his art. He received much recognition throughout his career, including an invitation from the government of Iceland to represent his homeland at the 45th Venice Biennale. His work has been featured in the United Nations' exhibition, World Artists at the Millennium and the nine-museum traveling exhibition What Nature Provides.

In 2016 a documentary/biography on the then 92-year-old artist was released; "A Force in Nature: Johann Eyfells".
