= Sorawit Songsataya =

New Zealand artist and musician

Sorawit Songsataya (born in Chiang Mai, Thailand) is a Thai-New Zealand artist based in Wellington, New Zealand.

== Education and career ==
Songsataya is primarily interested in craft, textiles, hand-made objects and their connection to computer technology. They often employ moving image and sculpture within installation environments.

Songsataya graduated with a Master of Fine Arts from Elam School of Fine Arts, the University of Auckland in 2013, and a BDes in Visual Communication from Unitec Institute of Technology in 2010.

From November 23, 2019 until October 27, 2020 Songstaya's sculptural installation The Interior was prominently displayed at the Auckland Art Gallery.

In 2024 Fibrous Soul, Songstaya's collaboration with Maata Wharehoka, exhibited at the Govett-Brewster Art Gallery.

== Notable exhibitions ==
=== Group ===
- Thresholds, City Gallery, Wellington (2022)
- Nature and State, Staatliche Kunsthalle, Baden-Baden (2022)
- nature danger revenge, Dunedin Public Art Gallery, Dunedin (2022)
- Otherwise-Image-Worlds, Te Uru Waitākere Contemporary Gallery, Auckland (2022)
- twisting, turning, winding: takatāpui+queer objects, Objectspace, Auckland (2022)
- Wild Once More, Silo 6 Project by Te Tuhi Contemporary Art , Auckland (2022)
- Listening Stones Jumping Rocks, Adam Art Gallery Te Pātaka Toi, Wellington (2021)
- Thinking Hands, Touching Each Other, the 6th Ural Industrial Biennial, Yekaterinburg (2021)
- Heavy trees, arms and legs, The Suter Art Gallery, Nelson and Auckland (2021)
- The Turn of the Fifth Age, Taipei Contemporary Art Centre in collaboration with Selasar Sunaryo Art Space, Bandung (2021)
- Cherish TV, Cherish Gallery, Geneva (2020)
- Bright Cave, Blue Oyster Art Project Space, Dunedin (2018)
- Soon Enough: Art in Action, Tensta Konsthall, Stockholm (2018)

=== Solo ===
- Nature and State, Staatliche Kunsthalle Baden-Baden, 2022.
- Otherwise-Image-Worlds, Te Uru Waitākere Contemporary Gallery, Auckland (2022)
- Rumours (Mermaid), Govett-Brewster Art Gallery, New Plymouth, 2020.
- The Interior, Auckland Art Gallery, Auckland, 2019.
- Offspring of Rain, Enjoy Contemporary Art Space, Wellington, 2019.
- Jupiter, Te Uru Waitakere Contemporary Gallery, 2019.

== Awards and residencies ==
- Singapore Art Museum residency, Singapore, 2024
- Gasworks residency, London, 2023.
- Frances Hodgkins Fellowship recipient in 2022.
- Molly Morpeth Canaday Award 3D in 2020.
- National Contemporary Art Award in 2016.
- Govett-Brewster Art Gallery ‘In Residence’ Programme, 2021.
- McCahon House residency, Auckland, 2018.
