= Luca Alinari =

Italian painter (1943–2019)

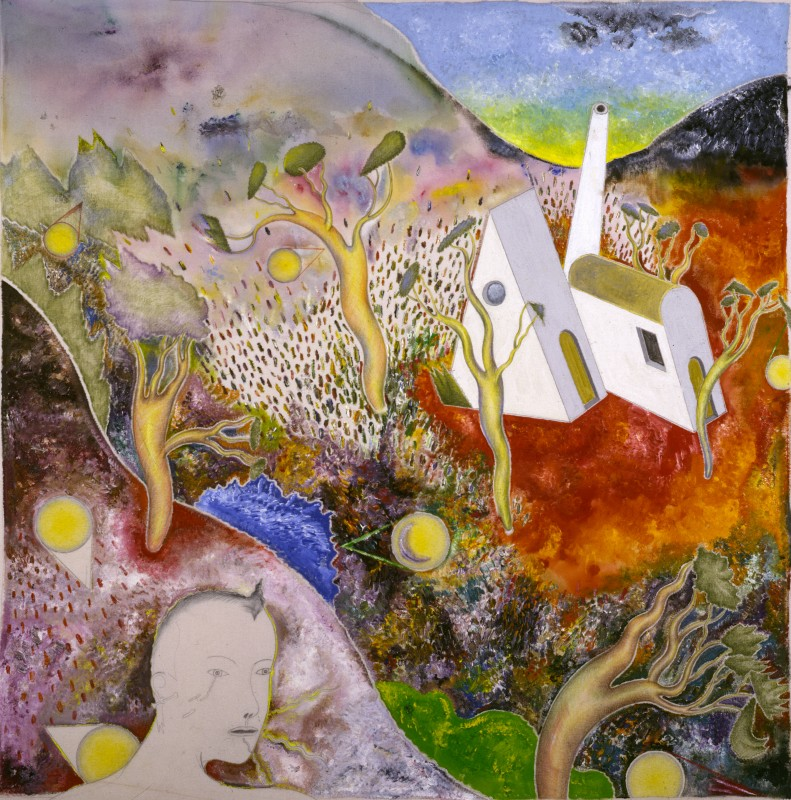
Il passeggiatore solitario, 1989–1990 (Art collections of Fondazione Cariplo)

Luca Alinari (27 October 1943 – 15 March 2019) was an Italian painter.

== Biography ==
Alinari was born in Florence. Self-taught, he made his debut in 1968 with his first one-man show at the Galleria Inquadrature in Florence. During the 1970s he began an intense research on the free juxtaposition of objects and figures within a fantastical and suspended atmosphere, influenced by Neo-Dada and Pop Art research. During those years he experimented with various pictorial techniques, combining fluorescent colours, decalcomania, collage and photographic transpositions. Between 1972 and 1973 he exhibited in the main private galleries in Florence, presented by his friend the poet Alfonso Gatto.

During the 1980s he gained official recognition through his participation in the 40th Venice Biennale (1982) and in the 11th Rome Quadriennale (1985). In 1993 he had his first retrospective mounted at the Royal Palace of Milan Museum, where he showed a group of works spanning his whole artistic career. The exhibition signalled the beginning of his series of fantastical landscapes characterised by bright, vivid colours and a pictorial technique combining thickly applied pigment with refined fields of smooth, transparent colour.

Luca Alinari died in Florence on March 15, 2019, at the age of 76.

== Bibliography ==
- Gianni Pozzi, ‘’Luca Alinari’’, Vallecchi, Florence, 1986.
- Elena Lissoni, Luca Alinari, online catalogue Artgate by Fondazione Cariplo, 2010, CC BY-SA (source for the first revision of this article).
