= Matthew Wong =

Canadian artist (1984–2019)

- Born: March 8, 1984; Toronto, Ontario, Canada
- Died: October 2, 2019 (aged 35); Edmonton, Alberta, Canada
- Education: University of Michigan & City University of Hong Kong
- Occupation: Painter

Matthew Wong (Chinese: 王俊傑; March 8, 1984 – October 2, 2019) was a Canadian artist. Self-taught as a painter, Wong received critical acclaim for his work before his death in 2019 at the age of 35. Roberta Smith, co-chief art critic at The New York Times, has praised Wong as "one of the most talented painters of his generation."

== Biography ==
Wong was born in Toronto in 1984. His family emigrated to Hong Kong when he was seven. When he was fifteen, his family returned to Canada, in part to support the treatment of Wong's autism. Wong then attended the University of Michigan, Ann Arbor, completing a degree in cultural anthropology in 2007. He returned to Hong Kong the same year. In 2010 he enrolled at the City University of Hong Kong School of Creative Media, receiving a Master of Fine Arts degree in photography in 2012.

Wong had Tourette syndrome and suffered from depression throughout his adult life. He died by suicide in 2019 at age 35 in Edmonton, Alberta.

== Art career ==
Wong's creative work began with experiments with photography in 2009 and continued during his time as a student of photography at City University in Hong Kong. Unsatisfied with the idea of becoming a photographer, in 2014 Wong told Neoteric Magazine that "towards the end of my degree I felt I had gained no real skills or prospects that could take me forward in the professional world." In 2012 he began experimenting with drawing. He began painting landscapes in 2014.

In 2016 he returned to Canada, settling in Edmonton. Wong posted his paintings to Facebook and attracted the attention of Matthew Higgs, curator and director of White Columns Gallery. Wong attained his first institutional recognition when the Dallas Museum of Art acquired his work, The West, in 2017. The DMA was the only museum to acquire a painting by Wong during his lifetime. Wong went on to exhibit at galleries in New York and Hong Kong. Critic Jerry Saltz called Wong's 2018 solo exhibition at Karma Gallery “one of the most impressive solo New York debuts I’ve seen in a while.”

Due to their scarcity in the open market, Wong's works have attracted interest on the auction market. His Edmonton studio remains untouched.

== Solo exhibitions and retrospectives ==
- 2025 Matthew Wong | Vincent van Gogh: Painting as a Last Resort, Albertina Museum, Vienna
- 2024 Matthew Wong | Vincent van Gogh: Painting as a Last Resort, Van Gogh Museum, Amsterdam
- 2023 The Realm of Appearances, Museum of Fine Arts, Boston
- 2022 The Realm of Appearances, Dallas Museum of Art
- 2021 Blue View, Art Gallery of Ontario, Toronto
- 2019 Blue, Karma, New York
- 2019 Day by Night, Massimo De Carlo, Hong Kong
- 2018 Karma, New York
- 2018 galerie frank elbaz, Paris, France
- 2015 Pulse of the Land, Hong Kong Visual Arts Centre, Hong Kong

== Collections ==
His work is included in public collections such as the Metropolitan Museum of Art, the Museum of Modern Art, New York, the Dallas Museum of Art, the Aishti Foundation and the Estée Lauder Collection.

== Record sale prices ==
In 2020, a small watercolor on paper simply called Untitled was sold for four times its original estimate price after attracting a number of bids. His first large painting available in an auction, The Realm of Appearances, was sold in July 2020 for US$1.82 million, twenty times its original estimate. In December 2020, a painting called River at Dusk was sold for $4.86M, four times its original estimate.
