= The Three Pioneers =

Public sculpture

- Artist: Martin Dawe
- Completion date: September 4, 2019
- Medium: Bronze
- Subject: Ford C. Greene, Ralph A. Long Jr., and Lawrence Williams
- Location: Georgia Tech, Atlanta, Georgia, United States

The Three Pioneers is a public sculpture on the main campus of the Georgia Institute of Technology (Georgia Tech). Created by Martin Dawe, the statue honors the first three Black American students at the institute, who enrolled in 1961.

== Description ==
The statue features three bronze sculptures depicting Ford C. Greene, Ralph A. Long Jr., and Lawrence Williams, who, in September 1961, became the first Black Americans to enroll at Georgia Tech. The statue is located in an area of the main campus called Harrison Square, named after Edwin D. Harrison, President of the institute at the time these students enrolled. Continuing the Conversation, a statue honoring Rosa Parks, is also located in the square. The statue was unveiled on September 4, 2019. That same day, The First Graduate, a statue honoring Ronald Yancey, the first African American to graduate from the institute, was also dedicated at the Clough Undergraduate Learning Commons. Collectively, the two statues are referred to as the Trailblazers statues. The statues' unveilings were attended by Greene, Long, Williams, and Yancey.

== See also ==
- 2019 in art
