= Eleng Luluan =

Taiwanese artist (born 1968)

Eleng Luluan (Chinese characters of indigenous name: 峨冷 ‧ 魯魯安; Chinese: 安聖惠, An Sheng-hui) (born 1968) is an indigenous artist of the Rukai tribe in Pingtung, Taiwan. Creating mixed-media sculptures and environmental installations, she tries to convey a connection between herself and land while also addressing self-discovery and the history of indigenous tribes. Elene Luluan has devoted herself to artwork for over a decade. Representative works include Ngialibalibade – to the Lost Myth, Between Dreams, and Flower of Life, covering climate change, environmental issues, and protection of life within the maternal body. In 2016, she won the Grand Prize of the 3rd Pulima Art Award. Eleng Luluan has garnered recognition for her work by receiving invitations to exhibit in international platforms, such as the Liverpool Biennial and International Indigenous Contemporary Art exhibitions.

== Early life ==
Eleng Luluan was born in 1968 in the Rukai chief family of the old Haocha tribe in Dawu Mountain, Pingtung County. She has led a life characterized by rebellion against tradition and a pursuit of self-discovery through art. After graduating from the Industrial and Home Economics Department at National Nei-Pu Senior Agricultural-Industrial Vocational High School, Eleng Luluan chose to leave her hometown and move to Taipei. In Taipei for more than ten years, she worked as a hairdresser, caregiver, photography assistant, ironworker, carpenter, funeral florist, and so forth. Later on, she returned to her birthplace and opened the Artisan Flower Studio to start her new life.

In 1998, Eleng Luluan was invited by Wang Wei-Chang to participate in the Contemporary Aboriginal Art Exhibition curated by the Taipei Fine Arts Museum. Soon after this exhibition, Eleng Luluan closed down her floral studio and began a career in art creation. In 2002, she became one of the members of the Consciousness Tribe, having been living in Dulan of Taitung for nearly 20 years. During that year, she was invited to domestic and international venues for residencies and exhibitions.

== Art style ==
Born and raised in the Rukai tribe, Eleng Luluan loves nature and her home. She excels at creating mixed-media sculptures and environmental installations, particularly those works that convey tensile and conceptual strength challenges delimiting gender identities, discourses of settler-colonial, diasporic, migrant, other transnational and transcultural histories of Indigenous ways of knowing in contemporary art. She uses natural materials such as driftwood, flowers, plants and other daily necessities that are readily available in her life as media to create various art forms and structures. She is known for her constant migrations and drifting-bird lifestyle. Eleng Luluan doesn't label herself as an aboriginal artist or a female artist, which also shows that she is an artist who never sets limits for herself. She has often participated in protests for the rights of her tribe, trying to convey a strong connection between herself and land. The concept of the work originates from the gentle and kind characteristics of women, with forms resembling the contours of lake water nurtured in a gentle womb, as if born from this land, reflecting the limited experiences of life, and returning to the emotions and gratitude towards the sky and the land. Her works are rich in intention and power also with deep meaningful afterthoughts, containing messages worthy of taking time to thoroughly savor and digest them.

== Work ==
=== Ngialibalibade – to the Lost Myth ===
The artwork Ngialibalibade – to the Lost Myth was created for Liverpool Biennial 2023. The installation of Ngialibalibade – to the Lost Myth was located at Princes Dock, England. In the Rukai language ‘Ngialibalibade’ means “a state of going through.” It describes the growth of life, the transformation of the soul, the change in nature, the rapid development of technology, the noticeable changes in life, or the subtle ones hiding in our hearts. The inspiration for the artwork comes from Eleng Luluan's background of the Rukai tribe. Legend has it that the ancestors of the Rukai tribe were born from clay pots protected by two hundred-step snakes. Thus, the clay pot is a symbol of the origin of life. Based on this ancient legend, Eleng Luluan built a giant metal container with recycled fishing nets as materials to hand-weave partial structures, transforming the clay pot into a sacred vessel and sacred space. Audiences can enter the artwork and contemplate the interdependence between humans and water. It's also informative on the impact of climate change on the environment.

=== Between Dreams ===
The artwork Between Dreams was created in 2012. The installation of Between Dreams was once located at Kaohsiung Museum of Fine Arts, and was specially displayed at International Indigenous contemporary art in Canada. The inspiration for the artwork comes from her personal experience of nomadic life. Eleng Luluan's hometown was devastated by Typhoon Morakot in 2009, and she started to work part-time at different places. Between Dreams projected her personal spiritual state in the face of environmental changes. It was the first time she abandoned natural materials. Instead, she used packaging mesh bags, polystyrene strips, packaging paper strips, stockings, yarn, cotton, and other materials to weave her artwork. She aims to create a protective space similar to that of a mother's womb. This space expresses her community values and personal challenges. The shift in materials was like her detachment from her native environment, facing the growth in a new environment. It provided her with the energy to pursue her dreams.

=== Flower of Life ===
The artwork Flower of Life was created in 2016. The installation of Flower of Life was located at the Kaohsiung Museum of Fine Arts. Flower of Life represents the imagination of the birth of life. It features organic shapes with two components. The major one is shaped using large iron pots, stainless steel round bars, hemp ropes, and various types of wires commonly found in daily life. The other is smaller and it was made by wrapping stainless steel round bars and various types of wires. The smaller one resembles a cluster of trees, with colorful leaves and flower buds thriving upwards. The shapes of the leaves and flowers in the artwork was a symbol of lilies in the Rukai tribe. Eleng Luluan employs the common technique of "encirclement" in her work to depict the lily, giving this artwork a dual significance of protection and life within the maternal body.

== Awards ==
In 2011, Eleng Luluan received a nomination for the tenth Taishi Arts Award competition. The following year, she was selected to participate in an artist residency program in New Caledonia and contributed to the joint exhibition titled Beyond the Boundary: Contemporary Indigenous Art of Taiwan. Additionally, in 2012, she held her inaugural solo exhibition titled Fractures in the Memories of Life: Silently Awaiting.

In 2014, she was nominated for the Taiwan Pavilion at the Venice Biennale. In 2016, she won the Grand Prize of the 3rd Pulima Art Award and received the invitation for the joint exhibition, Hiding in the Island, at MOCA Taipei in 2017.

== Selected exhibitions ==
=== Liverpool Biennial ===
Eleng Luluan participated in the 2023 edition of the Liverpool Biennial, one of the UK's largest festival of contemporary visual art. She was the first Taiwanese indigenous artist commissioned to create on-site for this event. Her artwork, titled Ngialibalibade – to the Lost Myth, was a continuation of her series Ali sa be sa be and was inspired by her childhood experiences in the Kucapungane community, a Rukai aboriginal village in southern Taiwan. This participation represented a moment for the exposure of Taiwanese indigenous art on an international stage.

=== International Indigenous Contemporary Art ===
The exhibition took place in 2019 in Canada as a quinquennial event, serving as a platform for indigenous artists to engage with critical themes. Eleng Luluan was one of the 70 indigenous artists selected globally to participate in this year's edition. She represented Taiwan as the sole artist from the country and also the only indigenous artist invited from the Asia-Pacific region. Eleng Luluan's contribution to the exhibition was an installation titled “Between Dreams.” This participation underscores the global representation of indigenous artistic perspectives at the exhibition.
