= Ivan Allen College of Liberal Arts =

Academic department of Georgia Tech, Atlanta, US

Coordinates: 33.77365°N 84.40476°W

- Type: Public
- Established: 1948/1998
- Parent institution: Georgia Institute of Technology
- Dean: Amanda Murdie
- Academic staff: 262 (218 permanent, 45 temporary)
- Students: 808
- Undergraduates: 583
- Postgraduates: 225
- Location: Atlanta, Georgia, United States
- Website: iac.gatech.edu

The Ivan Allen College of Liberal Arts is a college of the Georgia Institute of Technology, a public research university in Atlanta, Georgia. It is one of the six academic units at the university and named for former two-term Atlanta mayor Ivan Allen Jr., a Georgia Tech alumnus (Commerce, 1933) and advocate for the advancement of civil rights in America.

== History ==
=== Early history ===
When the Georgia School of Technology opened in 1888, English was one of the six subjects taught at the time. The Department of Modern Languages was established in 1904. By 1908, the English Department was also teaching economic theory, general history, political economy, and physical geography. Two years of foreign language study were required for nearly all Georgia Tech majors. Departments of Economics and Social Sciences were established in 1934. These subjects were grouped into a formal school of liberal arts when, concurrent with the school's renaming as the Georgia Institute of Technology, the first two colleges were formed: the College of Engineering and the General College.

In 1968, a new core curriculum was approved that included both humanities and social sciences. The History and Technology program was created in the Department of Social Sciences, with a (then) controversial use of engineering, science, and technology as a lens for history studies. Georgia Tech's first African American professor, William Peace, was hired in the college's Department of Social Sciences in 1968. The college awarded its first baccalaureate degree in Economics in 1971. In 1975, the General College was renamed the College of Science and Liberal Studies (COSALS) and the Master of Science degree in Technology and Science Policy was established.

=== Formation of the Ivan Allen College ===
In 1990, the College of Sciences and Liberal Studies was renamed the Ivan Allen College of Management, Policy and International Affairs in honor of former Atlanta Mayor Ivan Allen Jr. In addition to the three schools included in the new name, the reconfigured college also encompassed individual schools of History and Technology; Literature, Communication, and Culture; Modern Languages; Economics and Industrial Management, and Georgia Tech Reserve Officers' Training Corp (ROTC). In 1996, the School of International Affairs was renamed the Sam Nunn School of International Affairs in honor of the retiring U.S. Senator Sam Nunn, who joined the Ivan Allen College as a distinguished professor.

In 1998, the School of Management (now the Ernest J. Scheller College of Business) was spun off into its own college. As a result, the Ivan Allen College of Management, Policy, and International Affairs was renamed the Ivan Allen College of Liberal Arts, and its mission was redefined as encompassing liberal arts studies at Georgia Tech through the humanities and social sciences. In 1999, Sue Rosser was named dean of the Ivan Allen College, becoming the first woman named to an academic decanal post at Georgia Tech.

=== Modern Era ===
In 2004, the Ivan Allen College of Liberal Arts established the nation's first doctoral program in Digital Media within the School of Literature, Communication, and Culture. In 2008, the Ivan Allen College established a doctoral program in International Affairs, Science, and Technology within the Sam Nunn School of International Affairs.

Jacqueline Royster was named dean of the Ivan Allen College in 2010, becoming the first African-American to hold an academic decanal post at Georgia Tech. In 2012, the School of Literature, Communication, and Culture was renamed the School of Literature, Media, and Communication (LMC). In 2015, the School of History, Technology, and Society was renamed the School of History and Sociology (HSOC).

=== Deans ===
- Robert Hawkings, 1992-1998
- Sue V. Rosser, 1999-2009
- Jacqueline Jones Royster, 2010-2019
- John Tone, 2019-2020 (interim)
- Kaye Husbands-Fealing, 2020-2024
- Richard Utz, 2024-2025 (interim)
- Amanda Murdie, 2025--

== Schools ==
The Ivan Allen College of Liberal Arts comprises six schools, offering ten Bachelor of Science degrees, eight Master of Science degrees, and six doctoral degrees. The college also hosts Georgia Tech's Army, Air Force, and Navy ROTC units.

- School of Economics
- School of History and Sociology
- Sam Nunn School of International Affairs
- School of Literature, Media, and Communication
- School of Modern Languages
- School of Public Policy
- Reserve Officer Training Corps (ROTC): Air Force ROTC, Army ROTC, and Navy ROTC

=== Reputation and rankings ===
In 2016, U.S. News & World Report ranked the School of Public Policy 2nd in its list of Best Graduate Schools in IT Management. The publication also named the School of Public Policy as the #22 program nationwide in Public Policy Analysis and the #45 program in Public Affairs.

== Degrees and programs ==
All six schools in the Ivan Allen College of Liberal Arts offer Bachelor of Science (B.S.) degrees and Master of Science (M.S.) degrees. With the exception of the School of Modern Languages, each school offers Doctor of Philosophy (PhD) degrees.

=== Research centers ===
The Ivan Allen College of Liberal Arts has several research centers.

- Center for Advanced Communications Policy (CACP) in the School of Public Policy
- Center for Ethics and Technology (CET) in the School of Public Policy
- Center for European and Transatlantic Studies in the Sam Nunn School of International Affairs
- Center for International Strategy, Technology, and Policy (CISTP) in the Sam Nunn School of International Affairs
- Center for Media Studies in the School of Literature, Media, and Communication
- Center for Paper Business and Industry Studies (CPBIS) in the School of Economics
- Center for Urban Innovation (CUI) in the School of Public Policy
- China Research Center in the School of History and Sociology
- Climate and Energy Policy Laboratory (CEPL) in the School of Public Policy
- Communication Center (CommLab) in the School of Literature, Media, and Communication
- Intel Science and Technology Center for Social Computing (ITSC-Social)
- Internet Governance Project (IGP) in the School of Public Policy
- Digital Integrative Liberal Arts Center (DILAC) in the School of Literature, Media, and Communication
- Science, Technology, and Innovation Policy Co-Lab (STIP) in the School of Public Policy
- Technology Policy Assessment Center (TPAC)
- The James and Mary Wesley Center for New Media Education and Research in the School of Literature, Media, and Communication

== Facilities ==
Five of the six schools in the Ivan Allen College of Liberal Arts are housed in buildings on Georgia Tech's Central Campus. The School of Public Policy is housed in the David Melville Smith Building, one of the 12 buildings comprising the Georgia Institute of Technology Historic District. The Skiles Building, which houses the School of Literature, Media, and Communication, sits adjacent to the S. Price Gilbert Library, the Clough Undergraduate Learning Commons, and the Fred B. Wenn Student Center. The School of Economics and the School of History and Sociology are both housed in the Old Civil Engineering Building. In 2005, the School of Modern Languages moved to the Swann Building, a 100-year-old former dormitory.

The Ivan Allen College Dean's Office and the Sam Nunn School of International Affairs are both housed in the Habersham Building, which is located on Marietta Street near the Means Street Historic District. The Digital Media graduate program in the School of Literature, Media, and Communication is housed on the second and third floors of the Technology Square Research Building as part of Georgia Tech's GVU Center. The Ivan Allen College also utilizes the Stephen C. Hall Building, which houses the Writing and Communication Program, and the O'Keefe Building, which houses the ROTC Air Force, Army, and Navy programs.
