= Comedian (artwork) =

2019 artwork by Maurizio Cattelan

- The 2019 presentation
- Artist: Maurizio Cattelan
- Year: 2019
- Type: Conceptual art; sculpture
- Medium: Banana; duct tape
- Location: Art Basel, Miami Beach, U.S.

Comedian is a 2019 artwork by Italian artist Maurizio Cattelan. Created in an edition of three (with two artist's proofs), it appears as a fresh banana duct-taped to a wall. As a work of conceptual art, it consists of a certificate of authenticity with detailed diagrams and instructions for its proper display.

Two of the editions were originally sold for US$120,000 each at Art Basel Miami Beach to significant media attention. The third edition was donated to the Guggenheim Museum. In November 2024, an edition of Comedian was acquired by cryptocurrency entrepreneur Justin Sun for US$6.2 million at Sotheby's in New York.

== Background and description ==
Maurizio Cattelan is an Italian artist known for his tongue-in-cheek art, such as his 2016 creation America, a fully functional golden toilet. He previously used duct tape suspension for A Perfect Day in 1999, fastening the art dealer Massimo De Carlo to a gallery wall. At the 2019 Foire Internationale d'Art Contemporain art fair in Paris, the American conceptual interventionist Meth Fountain showed a half-eaten croissant affixed to the wall, predating Comedian by several months.

Comedian is a piece consisting of a fresh banana duct-taped to a wall exactly 1.6 metres above the floor. Cattelan purchased the bananas at a grocery store in Miami, Florida, for an estimated 30 cents. The work includes a certificate of authenticity along with detailed instructions for its proper display, intended for its owner to use when displaying the work. The banana and the duct tape can be replaced as needed; the physical representation of Comedian is not the work itself. It was Cattelan's first artwork for a fair in over 15 years. The piece was compared to Andy Warhol's 1967 pop art fruit. Emmanuel Perrotin, the gallerist exhibiting the work, stated Comedian is "a symbol of global trade, a double entendre, as well as a classic device for humor".

== Reception ==
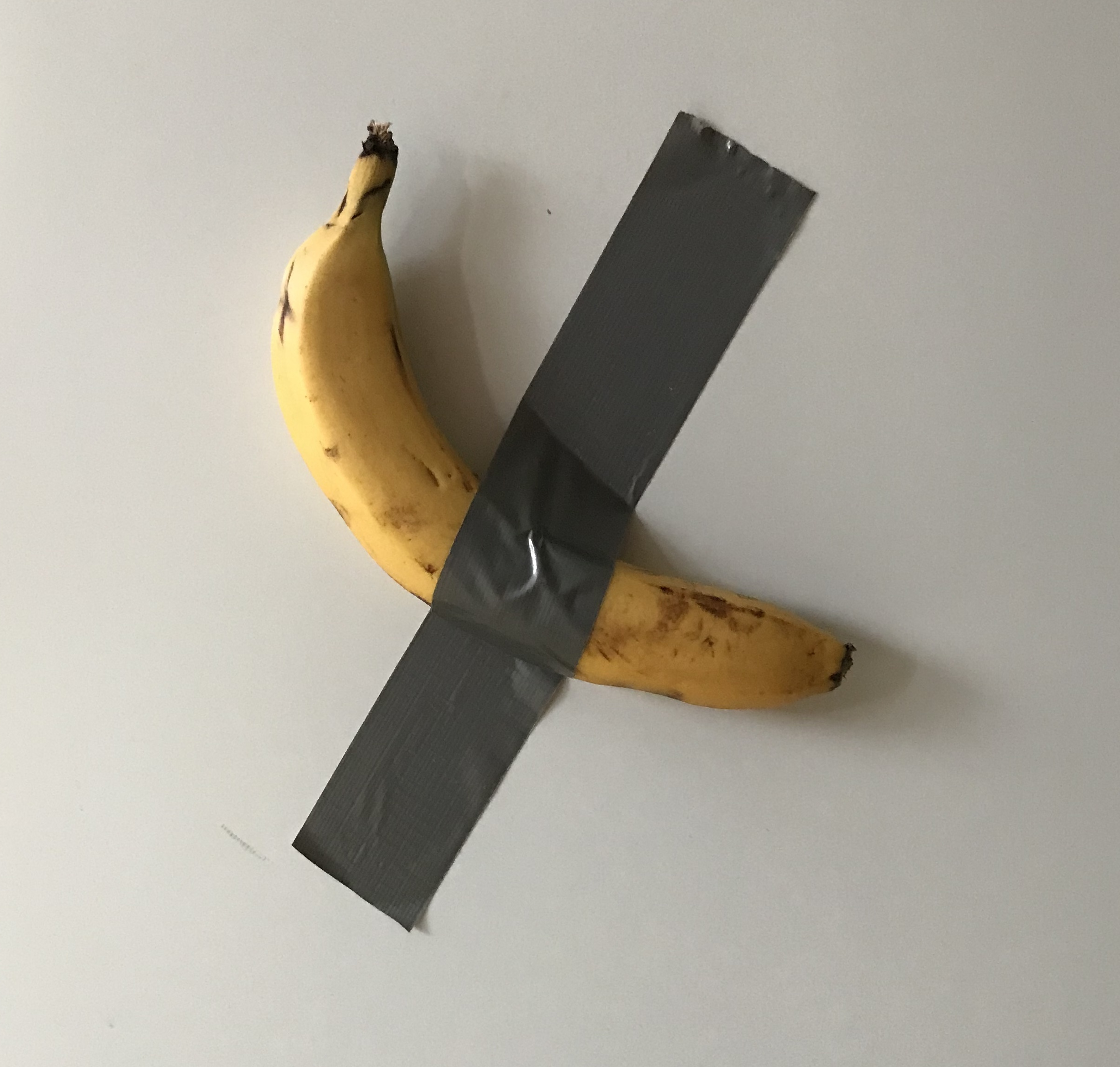
Recreation of Comedian

Comedian was controversial; some writers, such as Robin Pogrebin, questioned whether it was art at all. The Guardian called Comedian a "questionably genius work. ... It calls to mind the old Lucile Bluth Arrested Development gag about rich people not knowing the price of a banana". Artnet wrote the piece was one of the worst of the week, and that Cattelan "somehow duped a group of collectors into buying bananas duct-taped to walls for $120,000 a pop. Seriously". USA Today deadpanned, "This piece of art is bananas – literally". Newsweek called it "humorous minimalist artwork", while ARTnews asked whether the piece was cynical or thrilling. CBS News reported, "It may be the most talked-about artwork at this year's event." On December 13, the New York Post featured Comedian on its cover. In his 2021 book The Devil in the Gallery, Noah Charney stated, "Comedian is neither beautiful nor does it exhibit skill, so it represents the Duchampian path". In his book Beauty (and the Banana), the author Brian C. Nixon stated, "To say the least, Comedian is a commentary on the wild world of contemporary art, communicating how culture understands, interprets, and engages with the arts".

=== Purchases ===
The piece was released in an edition of three; two were purchased for US$120,000 each at Art Basel. The third was sold for US$150,000. The selling price garnered significant media attention. One edition was purchased by Sarah Andelman, a founder of Colette.

In August 2020, artist Damien Hirst complained to the media that he was unable to purchase the piece and had offered to trade any of his own works for it with Cattelan; Cattelan replied that the piece had sold out. The following month Comedian was donated to the Guggenheim Museum, with instructions and diagrams for its installation and display.

Following a highly publicised tour and bidding, Comedian sold at Sotheby's during "The Now and Contemporary Evening Auction" on 20 November 2024 for US$5,200,000 ($6,240,000 after fees), well above its $1,000,000–$1,500,000 estimate. The purchaser was the cryptocurrency entrepreneur Justin Sun. On 29 November, Sun ate the banana at a press conference at the Peninsula Hotel, Hong Kong. He retains the right to recreate the artwork at any time, but not multiple co-existing copies.

Shah Alam, a fruit vendor from New York City, United States, sold the banana used in the work for 25 cents. Alam expressed surprise and disbelief when informed of the sale, stating, "I am a poor man. I have never had this kind of money. I have never seen this kind of money.”

As of January 2025, the remaining piece not at the Guggenheim was on display aboard the residential cruise ship MS The World, which declined to name the owner when asked by a journalist.

=== Consumption of bananas on display ===
Following its initial 2019 sale, while still on exhibit at Art Basel, the Georgian performance artist David Datuna ate the piece in an art intervention he called Hungry Artist. The banana was replaced later that day. No legal action was taken against him, although he was asked to leave. Datuna stated, "What we perceive as materialism is nothing but social conditioning. Any meaningful interaction with an object could turn it to art. I am a hungry artist, and I am hungry for new interactions".

In April 2023, the piece located in the Leeum Museum of Art was eaten by a student, Noh Hyun-soo, who then taped the peel back onto the wall. When asked why he ate it he said he had skipped breakfast and was hungry. In July 2025, a visitor to the Pompidou-Metz ate the banana on display.

=== Interpretations ===
Following a flurry of publicity, several commentators satirized or interpreted Comedian. Designer Sebastian ErraZuriz taped a dildo to a wall with duct tape and listed it for sale for US$12,000. The cryptocurrency artist CryptoGraffiti created The Commodity, "which instructed collectors to find and claim a banana with a bitcoin key address carved into it". Actress Brooke Shields taped a banana to her forehead with blue tape and posted it to Instagram with the caption, "An expensive selfie". The designer Simon Porte Jacquemus "created a merch opportunity when posting a duct-taped yellow version of [his] micro Le Chiquito bag". Popeyes Chicken joined with the San Paul Gallery Urban Art in Miami to create The Sandwich, a chicken sandwich taped to a white wall with duct tape; it was listed at US$120,003.99 and "became a viral sensation in its own right". Multiple other brands followed suit, including the New York Mets, Burger King, Hostess, Perrier, Carrefour, Sweetgreen, Absolut and Bobbi Brown.

== Removal ==
On 8 December 2019, in the morning, Comedian was removed from the fair. The curators removed the piece because they were afraid other art would be damaged by queuing crowds. After the removal, the gallery released the following statement:

Comedian, with its simple composition, ultimately offered a complex reflection of ourselves. We would like to warmly thank all those who participated in this memorable adventure, as well as to our colleagues. We sincerely apologize to all the visitors of the fair who today will not be able to participate in Comedian.

After the removal, Perrotin created a social media account dedicated to the piece. One of the walls featuring the piece was later vandalised with the text "Epstien didn't kill himself [sic]" in lipstick, which was soon covered by the art fair.

== Court case ==
Artist Joe Morford filed a suit against Cattelan for copyright infringement of his 2000 work titled Banana & Orange. Banana & Orange features plastic replicas of the titular fruits duct taped to two green panels. Given Morford's claimed similarities between Comedian and Banana & Orange, Morford pursued a claim of copyright infringement, alleging that Comedian unfairly copied Banana & Orange. Morford further claimed that Cattelan might have seen his work and been influenced by it. On 9 June 2023, Robert N. Scola Jr., a United States district judge for the Southern District of Florida, granted Cattelan motion for summary judgment, closing the case prior to trial.

== See also ==
- 2019 in art
