= Maurizio Cattelan: Be Right Back =

2016 Documentary Film directed by Maura Axelrod

Maurizio Cattelan: Be Right Back is a 2016 documentary about the Italian contemporary artist Maurizio Cattelan. It was directed by Maura Axelrod. It premiered at the Tribeca Film Festival as a special presentation of the Guggenheim Museum.

== Plot ==
The film portrays the period from Maurizio Cattelan's early career to the occasion of his career retrospective at the Solomon R. Guggenheim Museum in New York in 2011, for which he hung all of his work from the ceiling of the rotunda of the building. The film features the curator Massimiliano Gioni who acts as a stand-in for Cattelan.

== Cast ==
- Massimiliano Gioni
- Nancy Spector
- Jerry Saltz
- Francesco Bonami
- Calvin Tomkins
- Dodie Kazanjian
- Giada Cattelan
- Victoria Cabello
- Sarah Thornton
- Emmanuel Perrotin
- David Goldsmith
- Katherine Brinson
- Adam Lindemann
- David Ganek
- Massimo De Carlo
- Victoria Yee Howe
- Rosemary Melene
- Tom Eccles
- Marian Goodman
- Dakis Jounnou
- Alberto Mugrabi

== Reception ==
On the review aggregator website, Rotten Tomatoes, the film has an approval rating of 86%.

Jacob Bernstein of the New York Times called the film "probing, wistful, and at times, hilarious.

Ken Jawarski of the New York Times said "When Maura Axelrod, the film’s director, examines recalls Mr. Cattelan’s pranks (including his use of doppelgängers, and a time when he broke into a gallery, stole objects and exhibited them as his own), the result is uproarious and thought-provoking."

Peter Debruge of Variety said that the film was "easily the most entertaining “art film” since Banksy's Exit Through the Gift Shop"

Gary Goldstein of the Los Angeles Times called it "A playful, intriguing documentary..."

Wilbert Cooper of Vice called the film "A brilliant distillation of the inscrutable Maurizio Cattelan."
