= Blind (sculpture) =

2021 sculpture by Maurizio Cattelan

Blind is a 2021 sculptural work by the Italian multi-media artist Maurizio Cattelan that memorializes the September 11 attacks of September 11, 2001.

Cattelan was in New York City on September 11 and had to walk home from LaGuardia Airport. The piece premiered at the Pirelli HangarBicocca in Milan in the exhibition "Breath Ghosts Blind" curated by Vicente Todolí and Roberta Tenconi, and was exhibited until February 2022. It has been reported that the artist first wished to show it at the Solomon R. Guggenheim Museum in New York City but that the museum's then chief curator, Nancy Spector had been "hesitant at best" ...[at such a prospect].

The sculpture consists of a black monolith representing one of the World Trade Center towers intersected by the silhouette of a jetliner. The statue is made from resin, wood, steel, aluminum, and polystyrene.
