= Perrotin =

Perrotin may refer to:

- Perrotin (Martian crater), a crater on Mars
- 1515 Perrotin, an asteroid
- Emmanuel Perrotin (born 1968), art dealer
- Henri Joseph Anastase Perrotin (1845–1904), French astronomer
