= Giuseppe Veneziano =

Italian painter (born 1971)

- Born: 22 February 1971 (age 55); Mazzarino, Italy
- Education: University of Palermo
- Known for: Artist
- Notable work: La Strage degli Innocenti (2012, 2020); In Bocca al Lupo (2011); Novecento (2009)
- Website: www.giuseppeveneziano.com

Giuseppe Veneziano (born 22 February 1971 in Mazzarino, Caltanissetta, Sicily) is an Italian painter and one of the leading figures of Italian art groups "New Pop" and "Italian Newbrow".

Politics, sex and religion are the three yardsticks that help Giuseppe Veneziano to assess the cultural climate of every period. In his paintings these three dimensions interact frequently, describing the chaos we are living in, among ideological and religious crises. If we look at the artworks of the past, almost 90% are characterized by religious subjects. Therefore, he often starts from them, creating new subjects and visions related to the present day. His aim is to revive interest in the paintings of the past to find out the relationships they may have with the world around us.

Giuseppe Veneziano's work is heavily influenced by popular culture. Contemporary Pop Art for Veneziano is dynamic, multifacited and pluralistic. His work expresses that creating art today means jumping over our limits, melting the most diverse languages and allowing their interaction, supporting the creation of new and more contaminated expressive forms. The Pop Art of Veneziano wants to be art that speaks to people simply, dealing with the values that people find interesting and important instinctively.

In spite of their ironic nature, his works of denunciation generally create a sensation. When he conceives a new work, this stems from an idea that is always the product of something he sees, he reads or listens to. Starting from these premises, he has summarized his vision in these few words: "if one of my works cause a stir, maybe it is reality itself that is scandalous".

== Biography ==
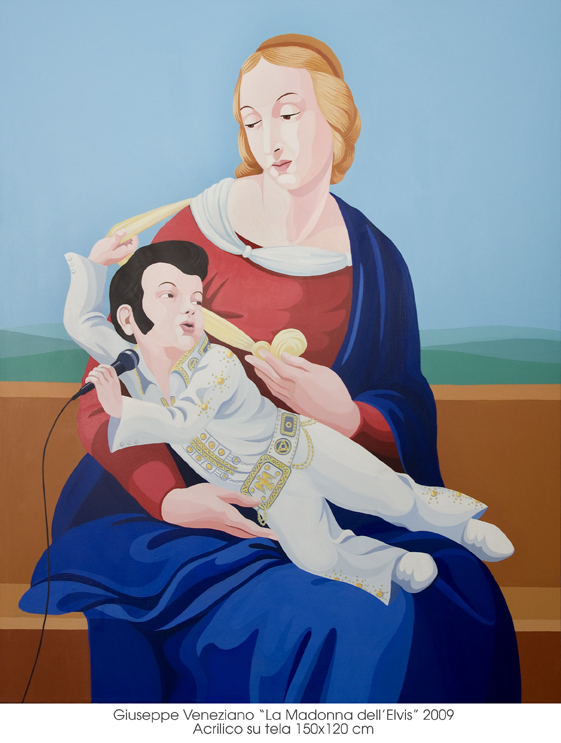
Madonna dell'Elvis, 2011 acrylic on canvas 130x100

He lives in Riesi (CL) till 1996 when he received a degree in architecture from the University of Palermo. In 1997 he moved to the city of Bologna to collaborate with the Glauco Gresleri Architectural Studio. In 1998 he returned to Riesi where he opened his own studio. Alongside his activity as architect, Veneziano also realized cartoons for some Italian publishers (i.e. Paruzzo Editor, Capitello Editor).

The first time that the artwork of Giuseppe Veneziano was noticed dates back to 2004 during an exhibition entitled In-Visi held in Milan at the pub Le Trottoir and curated by the writer Andrea G. Pinketts. Among the works displayed, a huge portrait of Osama Bin Laden. However the most debated work was the portrait of Maurizio Cattelan with a noose around his neck. Veneziano hung the work from the same tree where a month earlier the Paduan artist had hung three ragdolls to represent the violence against children. Both portraits of Bin Laden and Maurizio Cattelan were published on the cover of Flash Art Magazine.

In 2006, Veneziano made headlines for himself during the exhibition "American Beauty" held at the prestigious gallery in Milan Luciano Inga Pin. One of the works presented was a painting that depicted the decapitation of the famous writer Oriana Fallaci, entitled Occidente, Occidente. According to the artist, his intentions were meant to be a reflection of the fear atmosphere that most of Europe was experiencing after 11 September 2001, and after the terrorist attacks in Madrid and London. During the opening days the exhibition was broadcast on national and international media and a debate started with: the Nobel Prize winner Dario Fo, the photographer Oliviero Toscani, some important journalists (e.g. L.Annunziata, La Stampa; R.Farina, Libero) and the well-known art critics Flavio Caroli and Philippe Daverio. Even an outraged Oriana Fallaci wrote several articles in The New Yorker magazine. Many American blog spots accused Europe of anti-American sentiments referring to the exhibition of Giuseppe Veneziano.

In 2007 he participated the 6th edition of the St. Petersburg Biennale where he achieves an award.

In 2008 he is amongst the 20 artists invited to represent Italy at the "Artâthlos" exhibition held during the XXIX Olympic Games in Beijing, China.

In 2009 once again a painting by the Sicilian artist entitled "Novecento" captured the interest of public and media. The work is a reflection on the relationship between sex and power. Several protagonists of the 20th century (Hitler, Stalin, Mussolini, ...) are mated with cartoon heroines and porno-stars. The work was christened "The Cavalier's Orgy" by the press. In the foreground of the enormous painting, the Italian prime minister Silvio Berlusconi is pictured together with Cicciolina (an Italian hard-core actress).

In the same year during the Verona Art Fair, the painting, Madonna del Terzo Reich (The Virgin Mary of the Third Reich) was exhibited for the first time. The painting represents a revised version of Raphael's Madonna Cowper, holding a baby Hitler in her arms. The work was censured and the name of the artist was in the spotlight of national and international media once again. The Mayor, the Bishop and the Rabbi of the Jewish community in Verona all requested that it had to be removed. After this censure, in the empty space where the painting had been previously hung, Veneziano sparked a protest declaring his right to freedom of expression. The writer Aldo Busi intervened in support of the artist.

In 2010 the same painting was displayed once again, during the anthological exhibition of Giuseppe Veneziano entitled "Zeitgeist" held in Pietrasanta (Lucca). Also in this occasion, fierce protests were drawn from the local Parish priest. The municipality of Pietrasanta revoked its patronage before the inauguration and imposed that the images of the artwork didn't have to be diffused, although the adverts of the exhibition had already been put up. The Mayor of Pietrasanta disassociated himself from the exhibition, but he didn't close it despite the continuous pressure coming from the Bishop of the town of Lucca. In all the churches of Lucca, the Archbishop of Pisa published a letter declaring a ban on the entire exhibition. In defense of the artist a lot of Italian intellectuals intervened, such as Vittorio Sgarbi, Giampiero Mughini and Andrea G. Pinketts. Finally the exhibition remained open and it reached a huge success with over 10,000 visitors. During this period, the work was noted by the gallery dealer Stefano Contini, who purchased it for his prestigious personal collection. He also invited the artist to become part of his team of artists represented through the Contini galleries in Venice.

In 2011 Vittorio Sgarbi invited him to participate in the 54th edition of the Venice Biennale with an exhibition in the Italian pavilion. In this highly esteemed location the artist exhibited the work, Solitamente Vesto Prada (I Usually Wear Prada). The work was seen by stylists Dolce&Gabbana who commissioned the artist to do a portrait of them with the Madonna portrayed as the likeness of the singer Madonna and the courtiers as two putti at her feet.

In 2012, Ivan Quaroni chose Veneziano among 60 Italian artists that participated in the Italy-China Biennale.

In 2015, his painting Gli Sbronzi di Riace (The Drunks of Riace") was shown at the international EXPO held in Milan, as part of the exhibition "Tesoro d'Italia" curated by Vittorio Sgarbi at the Eataly pavilion.

In the same year he realized a permanent mural in downtown Pordenone, representing a young Vincent Van Gogh while he is painting his artwork Sunflowers on a wall as a simple writer.

In 2016 one of his paintings entered the permanent collection of the MACS Museum in Catania. During the same year, he started his activity as teacher at the academy of 'Belle Arti Aldo Galli' in Como.

In 2019 another of his artworks (Madonna del Cannolo) entered the permanent collection of the Modern and Contemporary Art Museum at Palazzo RISO located in Palermo.

Veneziano was named one of Il Giornale dell'Arte's worst artists of 2021 but the artist took it in stride saying "When Il Giornale dell’Arte's 2021 list puts you amongst the worst artist of the year and then you read the other worst artists (Banksy, Beeple, Jeff Koons, JR) the displeasure passes immediately."

== Solo exhibitions ==
2022

True Stories, curated by Valerio Dehò, Palazzo Pallavicini a Bologna, Italy

Apocalyptic and Integrated, AOA;87, Bamberg, Germany

Alter Ego, Space Gallery Soho, New York, USA

2021

The Blue Banana, Invitation by the city of Pietrasanta, Italy

2020

Mr. Quarantine, curated by di Ivan Quaroni, Fabbrica Eos Arte Contemporanea, Milano; Italy

Giuseppe Veneziano Versus Raffaello Sanzio, curated by di Stefano Papetti, Elisa Mori, G. Berardinelli, Palazzo Bice Piacentini, Pinacoteca del Mare, San Benedetto del Tronto (AP)

2019

Fantasy, curated by Aurelio Pes, Museo d'Arte Contemporanea Palazzo Riso, Palermo

Storytelling, curated by curated by Ivan Quaroni, Palazzo Ducale, Massa

Villains, curated by curated by Ivan Quaroni, Palazzo Mediceo, Seravezza (LU)

Fake Reality, curated by di Valeri Lalov, Kronsbein Gallery, Monaco di Baviera, Germania

Clito Ridens, curated by di Carlo Alberto Arzelà, Centro Polivalente San Carlo, Lajatico (PI)

2018

Operette Immorali, curated by Ivan Quaroni, Futura Art Gallery, Pietrasanta (LU)

St-Art, Curated by Angelo Crespi, Centro Polivalente Mondadori, Milano

2017

Mash-Up, curated by di Valeri Lalov, Kronsbein Gallery, Monaco di Baviera, Germania

Spin-Off, curated by Pier Giuseppe Moroni, 7,24x0,26 Gallery, Milano

White Slave, curated by Gualtiero Vanelli, Art Curial, Palazzo Crespi, Milano

2014

Un artista contro, curated by Stefano Contini, Galleria d'arte Contini, Cortina d'Ampezzo (BL)

2011

La surreale cronistoria del reale, curated by Luca Beatrice, Galleria Contini, Venezia

2010

Equivoci, curated by Vittorio Sgarbi, Museo della Mafia, Salemi (TP)

Zeitgeist, curated by Ivan Quaroni, Palazzo Panichi, Pietrasanta (LU). Gestalt Gallery

2009

Italians do it better, curated by Luca Beatrice e Giampiero Mughini, Angel Art Gallery, Milano. (with Francesco De Molfetta)

2008

Pregiudizio Universale, curated by Luca Beatrice, Angel Art Gallery, Milano

2007

La Rivoluzione d'Agosto, curated by Ivan Quaroni, Galleria Studio D'Arte Fioretti, Bergamo

Self Portrait, curated by di Ivan Quaroni, KGallery, Legnano (MI)

2006

American Beauty, curated by Chiara Canali e Ivan Quaroni, Galleria Luciano Inga Pin, Milano

2004

In-visi, curated by Andrea G. Pinketts, Le Trottoir, Milano

== Group exhibitions ==
2022

Eccentrici, Apocalittici, Pop. Inferno e delizia nell´arte contemporanea, Galleria Civica di Trento, Italy

2021

Italian New Brow, curated by Valerio Dehò and Ivan Quaroni, Pietrasanta, Italy

La permanenza del Mito, Palazzo Moncada di Cltanissetta, Caltanissetta, Italy

2020

Neue Stimmung, curated by Ivan Quaroni, Casati Arte Contemporanea, Torino

2019

Winter Group Show, curated by Natalie Clifford, Space Gallery Soho, New York City

Leonardo 50.0, curated by Filippo Lotti, Chiesa di Santa Croce, Vinci (FI)

Vedo Nudo, curated by E. Mori, G. Berardinelli, S. Papetti, Palazzina Azzurra, San Benedetto del Tronto

Il tesoro di Eros, curated by Daniela Arionte, Palazzo della Cultura, Catania

Reality Show, curated by Simona Campus, EXEMA, Cagliari

Looking For Monna Lisa, curated by Valerio Dehò, Castello Visconteo, Pavia

2017

Italian Newbrow-Apocalittica, curated by Ivan Quaroni, Labs Gallery, Bologna

Vasi Comunicanti, curated by Angelo Monti e Roberto Borghi, Palazzo della Triennale, Milano

Amen, curated by Danilo Mendola, Ex Chiesa S. Giovanni Battista, Gela (CL)

Pop Vibrations, curated by Demetrio di Grado, Palazzo Ceramico, Caltagirone, (CL)

Mostra Galeotta, curated by Giancarlo Lacchin, Spazio BIG Santa Marta, Milano

2016

Street Scape 5, curated by Chiara Canali e Ivan Quaroni, Teatro Sociale, Como

2015

La pratica della pittura, curated by Ivan Quaroni e Chiara Canali, Castello Spadafora (ME)

Imago Mundi, curated by Luca Beatrice, Fondazione Sandretto Re Rebaudengo, Torino

Pop Re-Generation, curated by Mauro Tropeano, Pordenone

Expo Arte Italiana, curated by i Vittorio Sgarbi, Villa Bagatti Valsecchi, Varedo (MB)

Tesoro d'Italia, curated by Vittorio Sgarbi, Padiglione Eataly, Expo Milano

5 piazze 5 sensi, curated by Chiara Canali, Pizza Belvedere, Enna

2014

Artisti di Sicilia, curated by Vittorio Sgarbi, Museo ex Stabilimento Florio delle tonnare, Favignana (TP), Palermo, Catania.

Superheroes 2.0, curated by di Silvia Fabbri, Villa Bertelli, Forte dei Marmi (LU)

Greetings From Italy, curated by Farm Cultural Park, Favara (AG)

2013

L'arte è un romanzo, curated by di Luca Beatrice, Museo Civico di Arte Contemporanea, Palazzo della Penna, Perugia

Riflessi D'Italia, curated by Chiara Argentieri e Angela Memola, C.U.B.O., Bologna

2012

Biennale d'Arte Contemporanea Italia-Cina, curated by Ivan Quaroni, Villa Reale, Monza

Italian Newbrow - Cattive compagnie, curated by Ivan Quaroni, Fortino Napoleonico, Forte dei Marmi (LU)

Rewind, curated by Luca Beatrice, Museo Internazionale della Musica, Bologna

63°Premio Michetti, Popism, curated by Luca Beatrice, Museo Michetti, Francavilla al Mare (CH).

007, New Bond Street, curated by Rossella Farinotti, Galleria Federica Ghizzoni, Milano

Dialoghi Contemporanei, curated by Giuseppe Filistad e Giuseppe Morgana, Centro Culturale Polivalente, ex Chiesa dell'Annunziata, Gualtieri Sicaminò (ME)

Subterranean Modern, curated by Giacomo Spazio, La Carrozzeria, Milano

Newbrow, curated by Ivan Quaroni, Pinacoteca Civica di Palazzo Volpi, Como.

Amici Miei, Spazio Cannatella, Palermo

2011

Padiglione Italia, 54ª Esposizione Internazionale d'Arte della Biennale di Venezia, curated by Vittorio Sgarbi, Arsenale, Venezia

Tra il Sublime e L'idiota: l'umorismo nell'arte contemporanea italiana, curated by di Luca Beatrice, Museo Internazionale dell'umorismo, Tolentino (MC)

Premio Maretti 3ª edizione, curated by Raffaele Gavarro, Museo Pecci, Prato

Danno d'immagine, curated by Cecilia Freschini, Zajia Lab, Beijing, Pechino

Italian Pop Surrealism, curated by Andrea Oppenheimer, Musei Capitolini, Centrale Montemartini, Roma

Trinacria, Art Factory 01, Le ciminiere, Catania

2010

Italian Newbrow - b/side, curated by Ivan Quaroni, Galleria Area/B, Milano

XXS curated by Emma Gravagnuolo, Gallery SuperStudioPiù, Milano

Micropop & Nipposuggestioni, curated by Cristian Gancitano, Angel Art Gallery, Milano

Misteri, curated by Ivan Quaroni, C.A.P.A. San Nazzaro (Benevento)

Marilyn Monroe - L'arte della Bellezza, curated by Carlo Occhipinti, Villa Ponti, Arona (NO).

Obraz 10, curated by Loris Di Falco, Galleria Obraz, Milano.

Anni '00, curated by A. Cruciani, Fiordalice Sette, Grace Zanotto, Galleria Famiglia Margini, Milano

L'ombra della Luce, curated by Ivan Quaroni, Officine dell'iImagine, BAF, Bergamo

2009

IV Prague Biennale di Praga, curated by Giancarlo Politi ed Helena Kontova, sez. Italian Newbrow, curated by Ivan Quaroni, Praga, Repubblica Ceca.

SerrONE, Biennale Giovani 2009, curated by Ivan Quaroni, Serrone villa Reale, Monza (MI).

Luna e l'altra curated by Ilaria Bignotti e Matteo Galbiati presso la galleria "Colossi Arte Contemporanea"

Undercover. curated by Mimmo Di Marzio, Wannabee Gallery, Milano – Galleria L'Archimede, Roma

Italian NewBrow curated by Ivan Quaroni, Galleria Carini & Donatini, San Giovanni Valdarno (AR)

Spaghetti pop Festival, curated by Ivan Quaroni, Galleria Studio d'Arte Fioretti, Bergamo

2008

Masters of Brera, curated by Rolando Bellini, Museo Nazionale Liu Hai Su Museum of Modern Art di Shanghai, Shanghai

Beautiful Dreamers, curated by Ivan Quaroni, Angel Art Gallery, Milano

Rumors, curated by AA. VV., ex arsenale Borgo Dora, Italian Factory, Torino

Trick or treat, curated by Ivan Quaroni, Galleria Spazioinmostra, Milano

VII Biennale d'Arte Contemporanea di Sanpietroburgo, curated by Enzo Fornaro, Sanpietroburgo.

Artâthlos (XXIX Giochi Olimpici di Pechino), curated by AA.VV; Haidian Exhibition Center, Pechino

Hiperorganic, curated by Jacqueline Ceresoli, Triennale di Milano, Milano

Allarmi 4, curated by Ivan Quaroni, Alessandro Trabucco, Alberto Zanchetta, Caserma De Cristoforis, Como

Le fabbriche dell'arte, curated by Marco Cingolati, Fondazione Stelline, Milano

Overview, curated by Ivan Quaroni, Ass. Arsprima, Valmadrera (LC)

Varial- Appunti per un discorso provvisorio, curated by Franco Spena, Centro Sociale Montedoro, Montedoro (CL)

Expo 40x40, curated by Ivan Quaroni, Galleria Studio D'arte Fioretti, Bergamo

Neroazzurra, Galleria Mandelli Arte Contemporanea, Seregno (MI)

2007

La nuova figurazione italiana. To be continued... curated by Chiara Canali, Fabbrica Borroni (MI)

Il treno dell'arte. da Tiziano alla Street Art: 500 anni di arte italiana, curated by Vittorio Sgarbi, Luca Beatrice, Chiara Canali, Duccio Trombadori, Stazione Termini, Roma

A ferro e Fuoco. Lo straordinario quotidiano della cucina. curated by AA.VV. Triennale di Milano, Milano

La vita attiva, continuità di senso, curated by Antonio Picariello, Castello Medievale di Macchiagodena, Isernia (BN)

Radical She II, a cura Andrea Bartoli, Castello di Favara, Favara (AG)

Impronte Digitali, curated by Cecilia Antolini, Palazzo Comunale di Gangi, Gangi (PA)

Lo stato dell'arte, curated by Loris di Falco, Galleria Obraz, Milano

60 Opere di arte contemporanea per Adisco, curated by Ivan Quaroni, Sotheby's, Milano

2006

Lost in a Supermarket, curated by Ivan Quaroni, Galleria Studio d'Arte Fioretti, Bergamo

K to your heart, curated by Ivan Quaroni, Galleria Kgallery, Legnano

Crisis - Il declino del supereroe, curated by Ivan Quaroni, Galleria San Salvatore, Modena

15 volte 1 volto, curated by Chiara Canali, Galleria Spazioinmostra, Milano

Allarmi 2- Il cambio della Guardia, curated by Ivan Quaroni, Norma Mangione, Cecilia Antolini, Alessandro Trabucco- Caserma De Cristoforis, Como

Bodynobody, curated by Luciano Inga Pin e Giuseppe Savoca, Galleria Luciano Inga Pin, Milano

60 Opere di arte contemporanea per Adisco, a cura Claudio Cerritelli, di Sotheby's, Milano

Sorsi di Pace - nell'Arte Contemporanea, curated by Ivan Quaroni, Gemme (NO)

2005

Radical She, curated by Helga Marsala, Gosh Arte Contemporanea, Riesi (CL)

Creative Turbulences 2, curated by Alessandra Merisi e Rosa Anna Musumeci, Fondazione per l'Arte Bartoli-Felter, Cagliari

Libertando, curated by Franco Spena, Palazzo del Carmine, Caltanissetta

Lo Sguardo Altrove, curated by Luciano Inga Pin e Federico Bianchi, Galleria Luciano Inga Pin, Milano
