= David Datuna =

American sculptor (1974–2022)

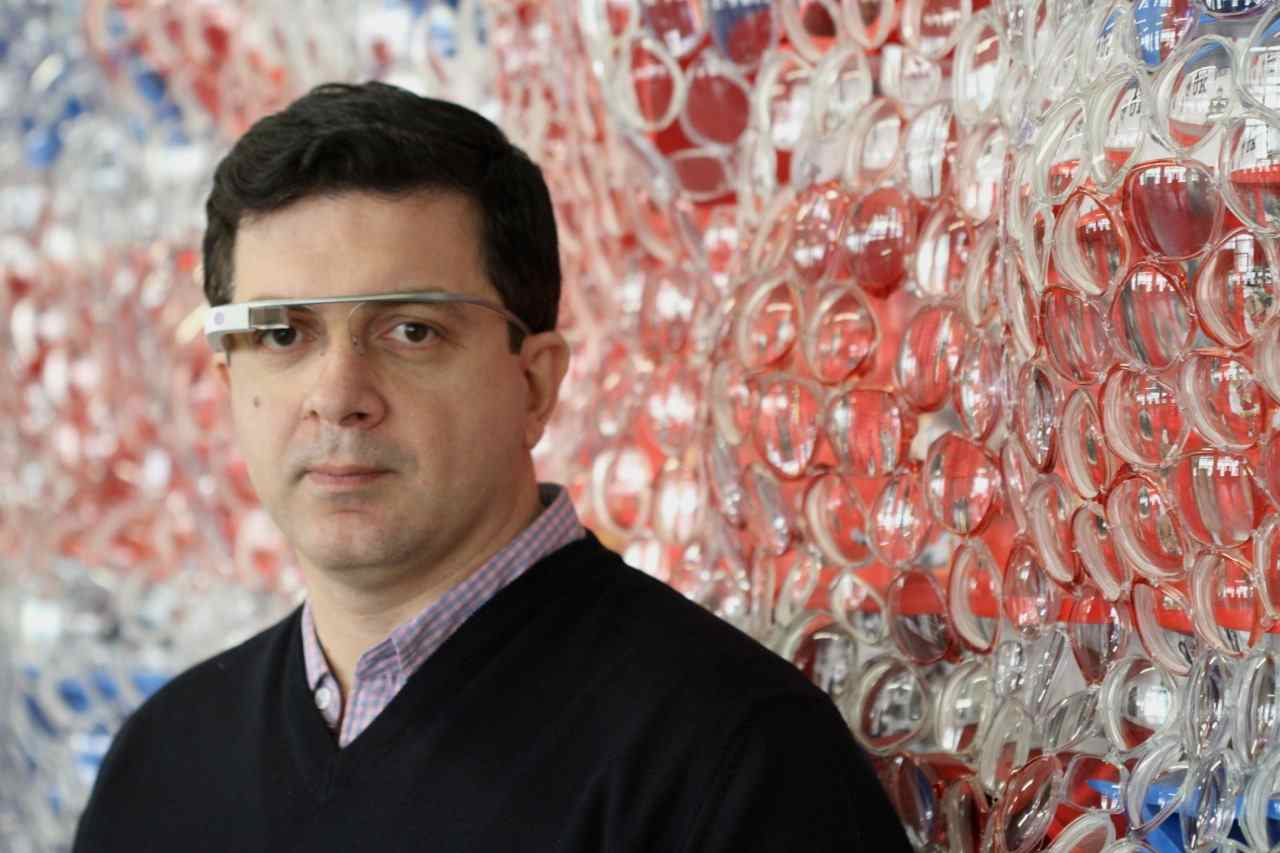
- Datuna in 2013
- Born: February 10, 1974; Tbilisi, Georgian SSR, Soviet Union
- Died: May 23, 2022 (aged 48); Boston, Massachusetts, US
- Known for: Sculpture, installation

David Datuna (Georgian: დეივიდ დათუნა; February 10, 1974 – May 23, 2022) was a Georgian-born American artist who lived in New York City. His Viewpoint of Millions series explores the sources and meaning of cultural identity from different points of view.

Datuna's signature technique in Viewpoint of Millions is a network of positive and negative optical lenses suspended over a large-scale layered, collaged and painted image. The mixed media palette often includes photography, newspaper articles, magazine clippings, paint, and color. The prismatic surface both hides and reveals the work below, while the lenses symbolize individual identity, illusion, perception, fragmentation, and unification. Portraits, flags and icons are recurring themes within the Viewpoint of Millions series.

Datuna's works have been exhibited in Europe, Russia, China, and the United States.

== Works ==
In 2011, Datuna's portrait of Vladimir Putin made out of miniature images of Mona Lisa was sold for $269,000 during the Art Moscow Fair.

In December 2011, Datuna's Steve Jobs / Ayn Rand portrait sold for $210,000 at the SCOPE Miami Art Show, one of the most expensive art pieces sold at that fair that year.

In January 2012, Datuna unveiled an installment in the Viewpoint of Millions art project, titled Viewpoint of Millions: Israel Beyond a Dream in Palm Beach, Florida. The artwork consisted of an Israeli flag triptych assembled in Datuna's style of cascading optical lenses, which represented the past, present, and future of Israel. A portion of the proceeds from the sale of the artwork were donated to the Jewish Agency for Israel and the Jewish Federation of Palm Beach County.

In May 2012, Global Art Group created a mobile application for the iTunes Store that lets users create art in Datuna's style, called Viewpoints.

In 2012, Datuna, together with Global Art Group and Mironova Art Gallery donated a portrait of Natalia Vodianova created out of Robert Indiana's LOVE symbol to Vodianova's Naked Heart Foundation charity auction. The work brought in $790,000. This was the second consecutive year of Datuna's involvement with the Naked Heart Foundation. In 2011, he donated his installation Chaotic Past, which sold for over $100,000 to Irina Viner, wife of Alisher Usmanov, a Russian billionaire, art collector, and majority Arsenal shareholder.

In December 2013, Datuna became the first artist to incorporate Google Glass into a contemporary work of art. The artwork debuted at a private event at The New World Symphony in Miami Beach, Florida, during the SIME MIA conference. The artwork moved to the Miami Design District for the public debut. The event lasted five days with over 1500 people from around the world trying on Google Glass and seeing Datuna's American flag from his Viewpoint of Billions series during Art Basel Week in Miami. The piece also displayed at the Lincoln Center in New York City. It is the first of ten flags in the Viewpoint of Billions series.

On October 18, 2016, Datuna unveiled his Make America Stronger Together installation at the doorstep of Trump Tower in New York City. The artist has combined the themes MAKE AMERICA (Donald Trump) with STRONGER TOGETHER (Hillary Clinton) representing a divided nation, and created two monumental works of art with the hope to bring the divided nation closer. The 10 × 20-foot mixed-media sculpture was created in Datuna's signature style contrasting different points of view challenging a fragmented contemporary culture. The work consists of two American flags facing back-to-back covered in a collage of newspapers, quotes, and images reflecting the current climate with the messages "SOS" and "ONE."

On October 31, 2016, Datuna flew his artistic representations of both U.S. presidential candidates both presidential to the Statue of Liberty in an art performance connected to the Make America Stronger Together installation. Datuna chose the New York City landmark for it being the most iconic symbol of American values and its unique status as the beacon of hope for the world. Following his cancer diagnosis, Datuna established The Fund for Life, a philanthropic organization dedicated to fighting fatal diseases worldwide. In conjunction with the Fund, David also established the Life Award, which is given to corporations and individuals for exceptional contributions to sustaining and saving of human lives. The first recipient of the Life Award became Gilead Sciences, Inc. for its work in Georgia in combating the hepatitis C epidemic.

On June 8, 2017, Datuna created a 10-foot ice sculpture of Donald Trump's name in response to U.S. president's withdrawal from the Paris Climate Agreement. Sculpture and the art performance was called This Too Shall Pass.

On December 13, 2017, he presented his rendition of the flag of Saudi Arabia to His Royal Highness Prince Khalid Al Faisal, the Governor of the Western Province, as a gift from the Americans to the people of Saudi Arabia. Titled Saudi Arabia - Viewpoint of Billions this mixed media sculpture is Datuna's call for closer human ties between the two countries, with art paving the way to better understanding, acceptance, and unity. This project was done in close cooperation and with support from the U.S. Embassy in Riyadh and the Ministry of Culture and Information of Saudi Arabia.

In 2018, the artist created the work "All-Seeing V" which was sold for 400,000 euros. The painting dedicated to Vladimir Putin was created on the eve of the meeting of the presidents of Russia and the United States in Helsinki.

On December 7, 2019, Datuna ate the banana installed as part of Comedian, by Italian artist Maurizio Cattelan, which had recently sold for $120,000 at Art Basel Miami. Datuna called his intervention an act of "art performance", dubbed Hungry Artist. He commented that he loves Maurizio Cattelan's artwork and really loves this installation, adding that it was very delicious. He added that “What we perceive as materialism is nothing but social conditioning. Any meaningful interaction with an object could turn it to art. I am a hungry artist, and I am hungry for new interactions.” Galerie Perrotin, which was exhibiting the work, replaced the banana consumed by Datuna and stated that the value of the piece was the "idea", not the physical banana.

== Datuna: Portrait of America ==
In 2015, filmmakers Michael Huter and Brian Bayerl produced a documentary about Datuna called Datuna: Portrait of America. The film tells the story of Datuna's escape from the repression of the former USSR to pursue his dream of cultural and artistic freedom in America. The filmmakers followed him as he worked on the first-ever artwork that fused contemporary art with wearable technology—all the while battling a potentially fatal cancer diagnosis.

The movie received the Best Film Award at the Raindance Film Festival in London, and Audience Choice Award for Best Documentary at the Ft. Lauderdale International Film Festival.

It was released to the public via YouTube on July 4, 2017.

== Selected exhibitions ==
In October 2012, Datuna's solo exhibition titled Emblem and Image featured a portrait of U.S. President Barack Obama that traced the arc of African-American political and social experience over 150 years.

In 2013, Datuna opened his Paris exhibition, Beauty and Power, on Avenue Matignon which featured fifteen works.

In October 2013, Datuna opened his Moscow exhibition, Eye to Eye, near Red Square at the Vetoshny Art Center, presented by Gallery Shchukin, where images of Russian icons and leaders like Vladimir Putin and Tsar Nicolas II were reinterpreted through optical lenses.

== Death ==
Datuna died of lung cancer in a Boston clinic on May 23, 2022, aged 48. Georgian President Salome Zourabichvili paid tribute to him on Twitter.

== Artworks ==
- Georgia - Millions of Hope (2014)
