= Landscape with Snow =

Painting by Vincent van Gogh

Landscape with Snow (F290)
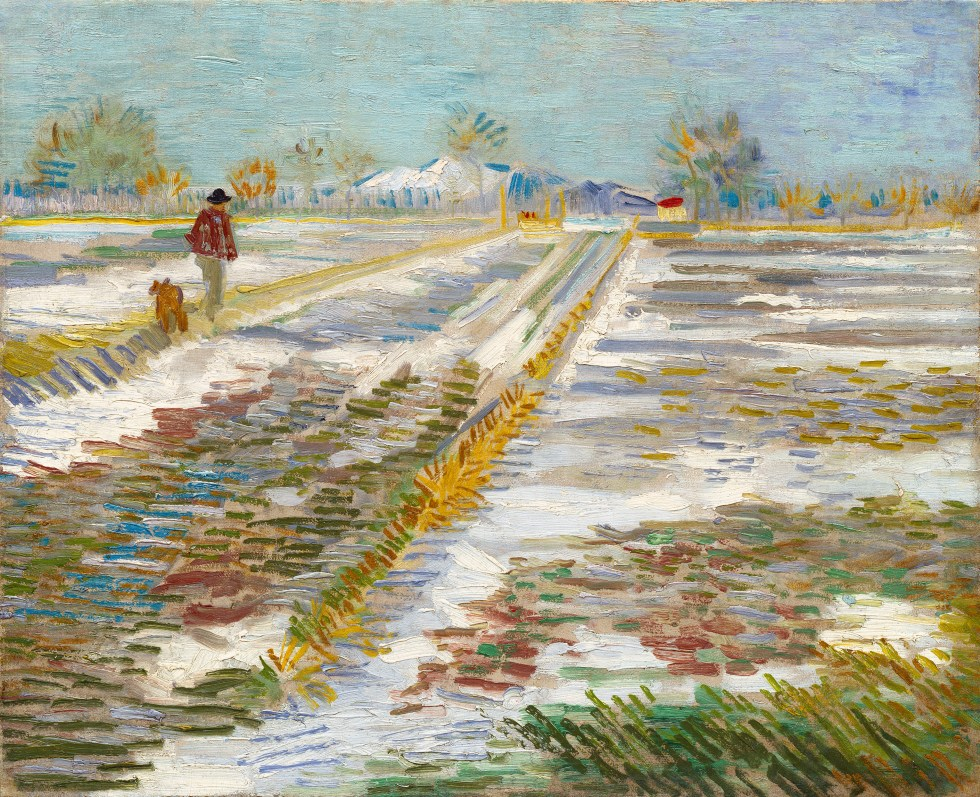
- Artist: Vincent van Gogh
- Year: 1888
- Catalogue: F290; JH1360
- Medium: Oil on canvas
- Dimensions: 38.0 cm × 46.0 cm (15.0 in × 18.1 in)
- Location: Solomon R. Guggenheim Museum; New York

Landscape with Snow is a painting by Vincent van Gogh in 1888, believed to be one of the first paintings that he made in Arles. It is one of at least ten 1882 to 1889 oil and watercolor van Gogh paintings of a snowy landscape. The painting reflects the La Crau plains set against Montmajour and hills along the horizon.

== Arles ==
When Van Gogh painted Landscape with Snow he was 35 years old. Living in Arles, in southern France, he rose to the height of his career, producing some of his best work, such as fields, farmhouses and people of the Arles, Nîmes and Avignon area.

The area was quite different from what he'd known in the Netherlands and Paris. People had dark hair and skin and spoke a language that sounded more Spanish than French. The colors were vivid. The terrain varied from plains to mountains. Here Van Gogh found a "brilliance and light that would wash out details and simplify forms, reducing the world around him to the sort of pattern he admired in Japanese woodblocks" and where the "effect of the sun would strengthen the outlines of composition and reduce nuances of color to a few vivid contrasts."

== The painting ==
When Van Gogh arrived in Arles in February 1888 the ground was covered with snow due to record cold temperatures. At the time of this painting the snow had begun to melt. It's thought that this painting is one of his first paintings made in Arles. In a letter to his brother Theo about February 24, 1888, Van Gogh describes having completed three paintings in as many days, one of them "a landscape in the snow."

The painting is made of the La Crau plain and Montmajour in the background. The audience is drawn in by the road that starts at the lower left hand corner of the frame right towards the trees, hills and snow-covered mountains at the horizon. Horizontal brushstrokes emphasize the plain that fills most of the painting; tension is created by the diagonal strokes of the road cutting across the plain. Van Gogh uses color to depict the components of the landscape. White and violet are used for snow. Brown, green and blue is used to suggest puddles and slush left by melting snow. Tufts of grass are painted in yellow along the side of the road. The view is accented by the red roofs along the horizon, brown dog, and the brown jacket and black hat of the man walking in the field.

Van Gogh, an avid collector of Japanese art woodcut prints, may have been inspired by the prints with snowy scenes. If so, he had not left behind the standards used in Dutch landscape paintings which use dark greens and browns within the foreground and blues in the sky. What is unusual, though, is that the horizon sits high on the horizon, the attention focused on the foreground and land leading up to the house, nearly as if Van Gogh was walking behind the man and dog on the field. A few days later, following a new snow storm, Van Gogh painted another similar but less detailed landscape, Snowy Landscape with Arles in the Background (F391).

== In popular culture ==
In September 2017, President of the United States Donald Trump and First Lady Melania Trump asked the Solomon R. Guggenheim Museum if they could borrow Landscape with Snow to decorate their living quarters in the White House's Executive Residence. The Guggenheim's Artistic Director and Chief Curator, Nancy Spector, declined. Instead she offered the White House America, a 2016 18K gold toilet sculpture by contemporary Italian artist Maurizio Cattelan, but that installation did not occur.

On November 10, 2023, rapper Aesop Rock released the spoken word track "On Failure" in his ninth studio album Integrated Tech Solutions, with lyrics primarily discussing Landscape with Snow.

== See also ==
- List of works by Vincent van Gogh
