= America (Cattelan) =

Gold toilet sculpture by Maurizio Cattelan

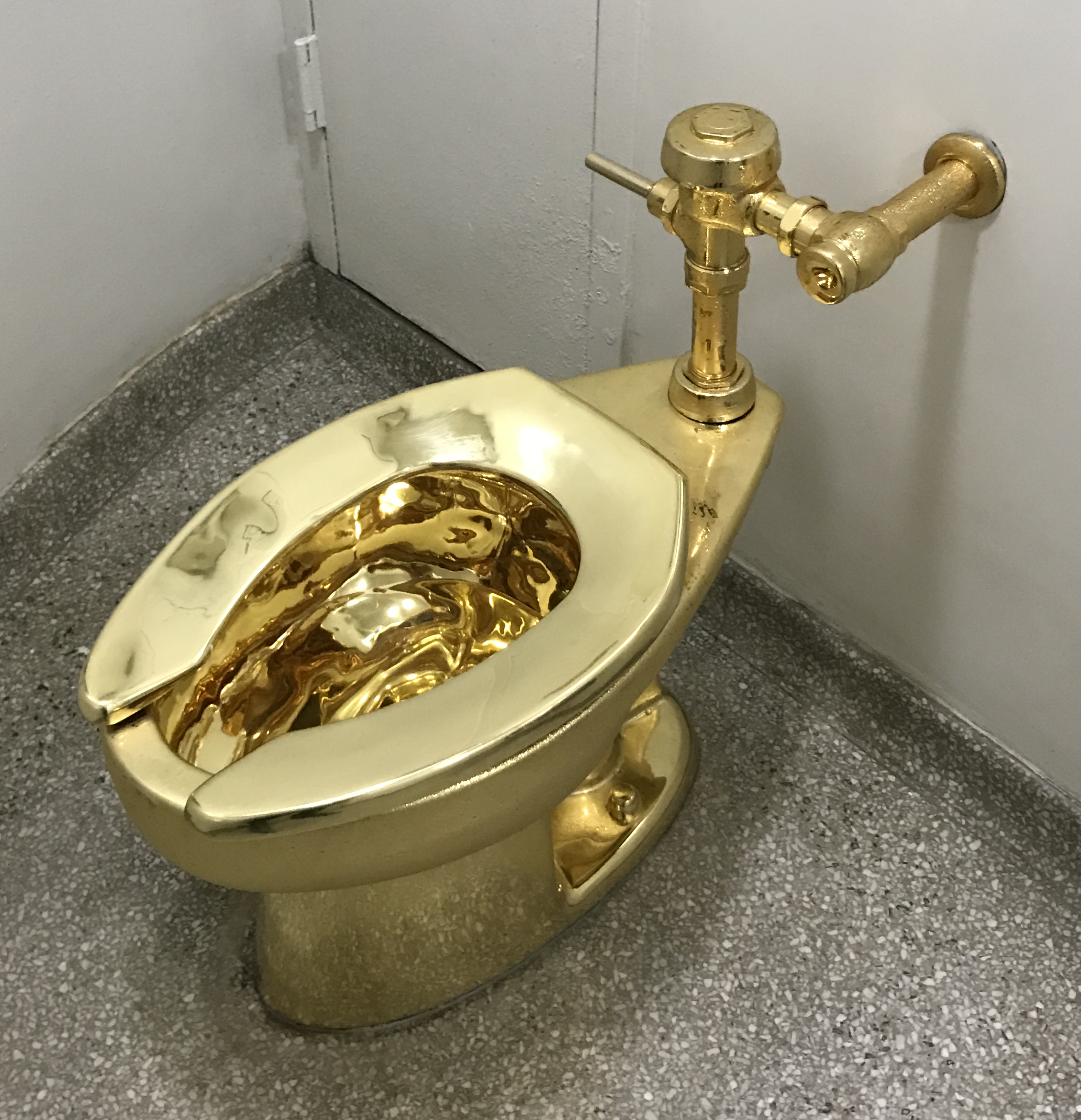
- America at the Guggenheim Museum in 2017
- Artist: Maurizio Cattelan
- Year: 2016
- Medium: Gold sculpture
- Condition: Lost

America was a sculpture created in 2016 by the Italian artist Maurizio Cattelan. An example of satirical participatory art, it was a fully functioning toilet made of 103 kg of 18-karat solid gold.

It was stolen in 2019 from Blenheim Palace in Oxfordshire, England, where it was exhibited on loan from the permanent collection of the Solomon R. Guggenheim Museum in New York City, United States. Authorities believe the thieves broke it up or melted it down to sell the gold. In 2025, three local men were convicted of its theft.

A second casting of America was sold at auction in 2025 for US$ 12.1 million.

== History ==
=== Guggenheim Museum exhibition ===
Cattelan created it in 2016 for the Solomon R. Guggenheim Museum in New York City, United States. It was made in a foundry in Florence, Italy, cast in several parts that were welded together. Made to look like the museum's other Kohler Co. toilets, it was installed in one of the lavatories for visitors to use. A special cleaning routine was put in place. The museum stated that the work was paid for with private funds.

According to the museum, over 100,000 people waited in line to use America, and a security guard was posted outside the room. According to Cattelan the work was made of 103 kilograms (227 lb) of gold, which in September 2019 was valued at more than US$4 million as bullion. As an artwork, it has been estimated as high as six million.

In September 2017 the museum declined a request from the White House to loan Landscape with Snow by Vincent van Gogh for the private rooms of Donald Trump, then the president of the United States. Nancy Spector, the curator, offered to loan America instead. Any reply by the White House was not reported.

=== Loan to Blenheim Palace and theft ===
In September 2019 America was installed at Blenheim Palace in Oxfordshire, England, where it was available for use as part of an exhibition of Cattelan's works. It was placed in a lavatory formerly used by Winston Churchill.

On 14 September 2019 it was stolen from Blenheim Palace. A representative of the palace previously said that because America was plumbed in, and potential thieves would be aware of its use, security was not much of an issue. Because it had been connected to the water pipes, the theft caused structural damage and flooding to the palace, which has been designated a World Heritage Site by UNESCO. The theft happened shortly before 5am and took about 5 minutes, and the sculpture was loaded onto a stolen car.

Cattelan said, "I always liked heist movies and finally I'm in one of them." Blenheim's insurance company said that up to approximately US$124,000 could be paid in reward for the return of the toilet.

In November 2023 the Crown Prosecution Service charged four men with the theft. By April 2024 one of them, James Sheen, serving a 17-year sentence for several thefts, had pleaded guilty. In March 2025 two local men, Michael Jones and Frederick Doe, were found guilty at trial for planning the robbery and helping to sell the gold. Doe's sentence was suspended in May. A fourth suspect was acquitted. Authorities believe the toilet was broken up or melted down.

=== Other versions ===
Cattelan said he made three gold toilets. In 2025, another edition of America was installed at the Sotheby's New York headquarters at 945 Madison Avenue, where it was sold on 18 November for US$12.1m, around 2 million more than its bullion value at the time, to Ripley's Believe It or Not!, the only bidder. This version, which had been with a private owner since 2017, could not be used by the public, unlike the version at the Guggenheim.

Local imitations of it have been made, including one that was itself stolen.

== Interpretation ==
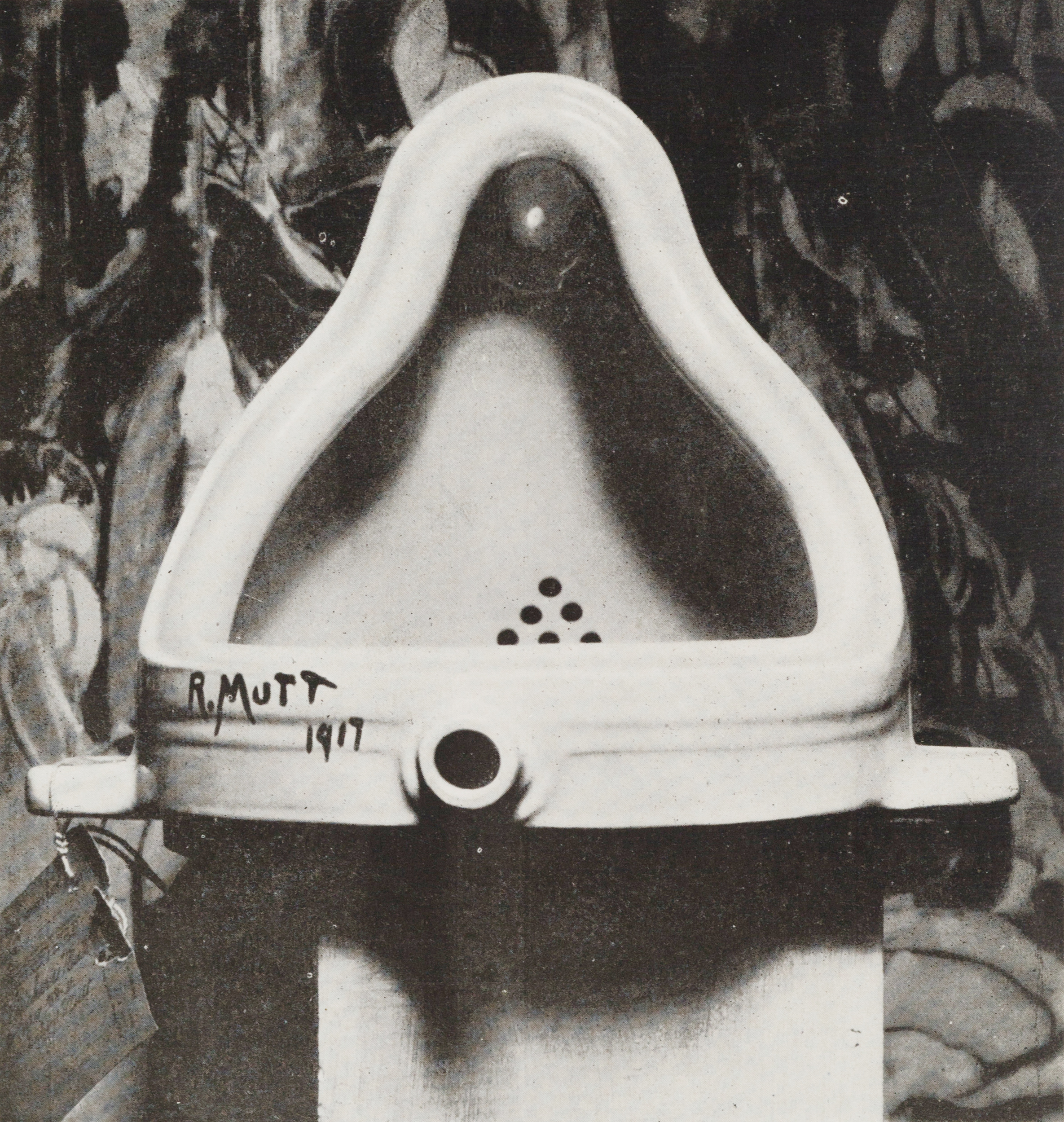
Marcel Duchamp's 1917 sculpture Fountain

The Guggenheim museum linked the meaning of the sculpture to the career of Donald Trump, writing in September 2016 that "the aesthetics of this 'throne' recall nothing so much as the gilded excess of Trump's real-estate ventures and private residences". Cattelan himself declined to give an interpretation of his work, which he conceived of before Trump's campaign in the 2016 US presidential election. He said that the connection to Trump is "another layer, but it shouldn’t be the only one."

The work has also been described as an interpretation of Marcel Duchamp's 1917 sculpture Fountain. The art critic Calvin Tomkins called it Cattelan's most beautiful artwork, and said "for viewers who crave a one-to-one relationship with art, this piece cannot be topped." The art critic Jonathan Jones, using the work at Blenheim Palace, opined that it felt "Much like peeing on porcelain. But here, among all the photos of young Winston, it also feels like pissing on British history." He also found it reminiscent of Boris Johnson's hair.

== Other gold toilets ==
There is evidence that some wealthy ancient Romans used gold chamber pots, though no examples are known to have survived.

Bayan Palace in Kuwait is fitted with gold toilets; they were temporarily removed during the Gulf War.

In the 1970s a sanitation firm began offering solid gold toilet seats after receiving a special order from a customer who wanted one as an investment.

In 2002 Winger Lam Sai-wing, a Hong Kong businessman, included two gold toilets in what he called a shrine to Vladimir Lenin. He referred to a comment by Lenin (Note: "When we are victorious on a world scale I think we shall use gold for the purpose of building public lavatories in the streets of some of the largest cities of the world.") about building public toilets of gold after the global victory of socialism. In 2019 the Hong Kong jewellery firm Coronet displayed a gold toilet in Shanghai, China. This toilet had a bulletproof seat containing more than 40,000 small diamonds.

== Gallery ==
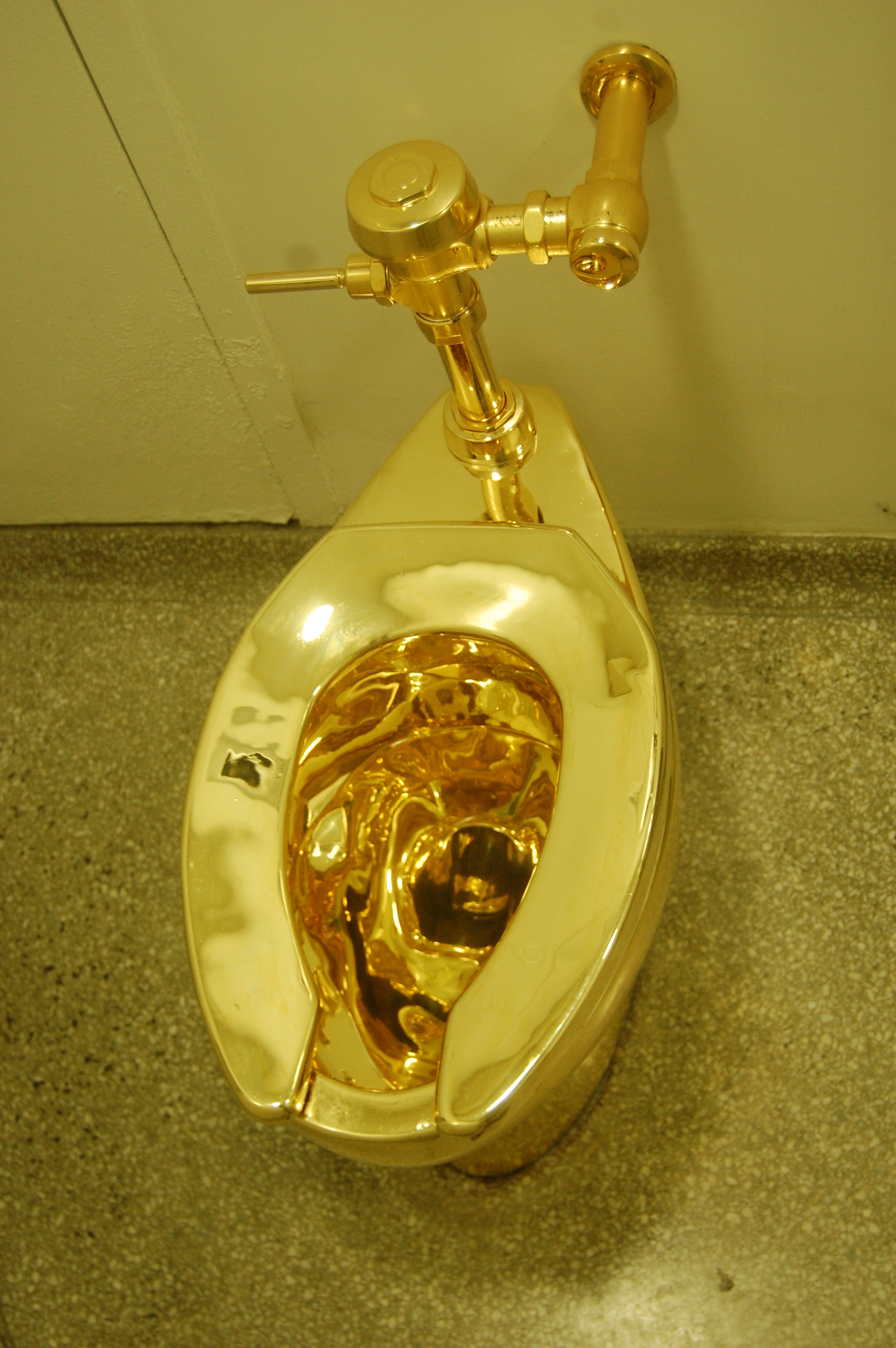
Top view

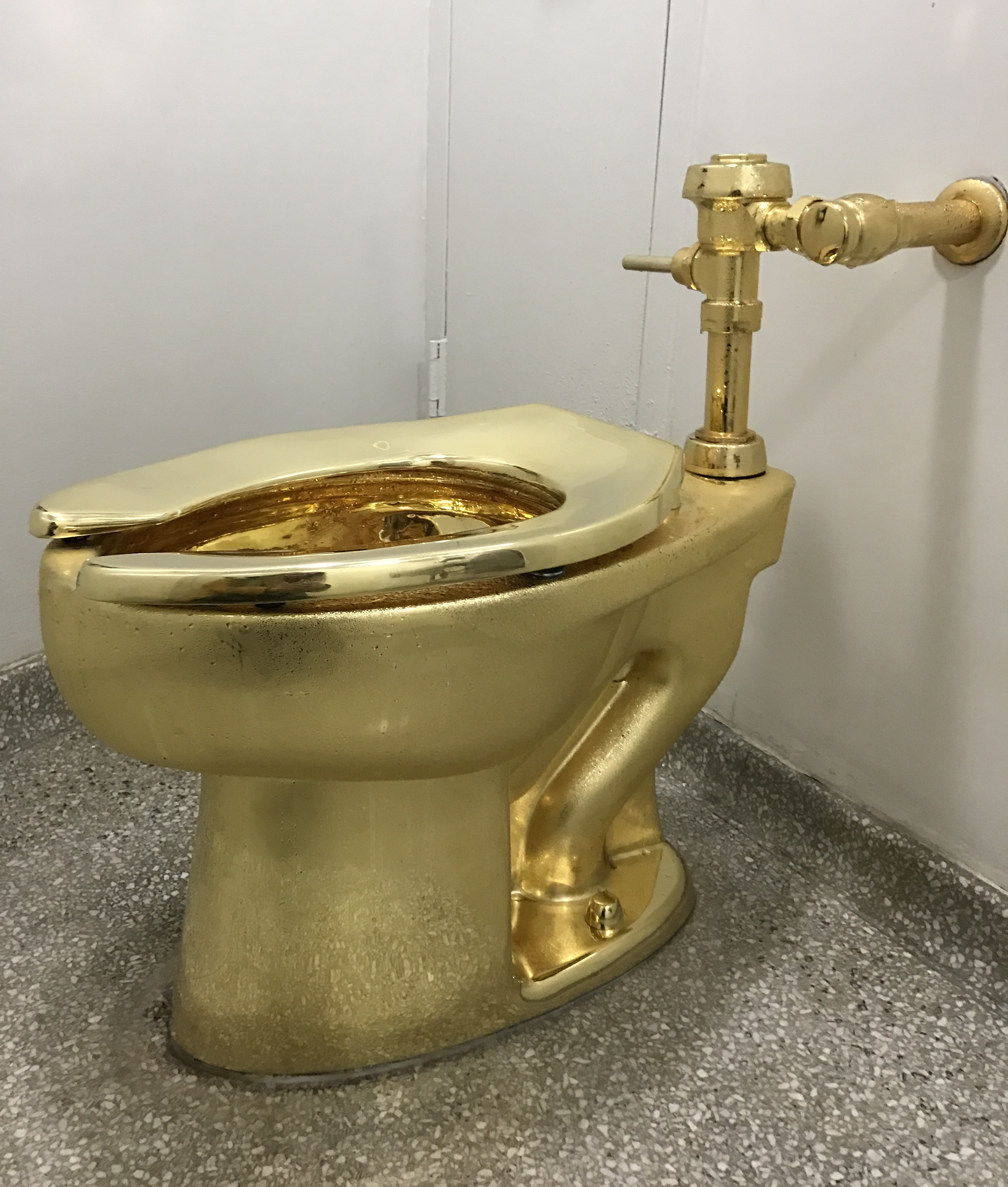
Side view

== See also ==
- List of heists in the United Kingdom
