= Sebastian ErraZuriz =

Chilean designer (born 1980 )

- Occupations: Artist, designer
- Website: www.meetsebastian.com

Sebastian Errazuriz (born 1977) is a designer, artist, entrepreneur and activist based in New York. He is known for a diverse body of work that demands reconsideration of familiar objects. These works often challenge viewers perceptions of how things are, and blur the boundaries between contemporary art, design, and craft.

At 28 Errazuriz became the second living South American artist to have his work sold at Sotheby's Important Twentieth Century Design. In 2010 he was named Chilean Designer of the Year. In 2014 he had his first solo show at Carnegie Museum of Art, which garnered earned him comparisons to Marcel Duchamp and Maurizio Cattelan.

Errazuriz has been featured in multiple magazine covers and portrayed in thousands of press articles. He has received critical acclaim from The New York Times, The Financial Times and The Wall Street Journal, among others. Gestalten published the first monograph of his work. In addition, his work has been featured in mainstream TV on BBC, CNN, and ABC". His work has been exhibited all over the world including in the middle of Times Square with his 2015 public art installation A Pause in the City that Never Sleeps, where the artist's yawning face appeared on multiple of the monitors.

== Biography ==
Sebastian Errazuriz was born in Santiago, Chile, and raised in London. He received an industrial design degree from Pontifical Catholic University of Chile in Santiago, and a master's degree in Fine Arts from New York University.

== Works ==
=== Art objects ===
Using humor in designs such as T for TWO, a shareable split down the middle mug, and Cocaine Slab, a tray with four linear embedded slots for the perfect line, Errazuriz has been able to create unorthodox solutions. As a designer and artist, Ezzaruris has often used product design elements to explore art vs. design and put forth challenging ideas with such themes as life, death, and religion.

One of Errazuiz's most iconic pieces, the 2009 Boat Coffin allows its occupants to sail off in their eternal resting place in style, noting the inevitability of death.

Between 2008 and 2009 Errazuriz took on Christianity with his collection of sculptures and objects culminating in his collection God Saves. The pieces in this series include; Road Kill; The Passion of Christ; Superman Christ; Saint Sebastian; and Gulliver. Each piece applies humor to the depiction of Jesus (accept for Saint Sebastian, where Errazuriz himself is depicted as a martyr in the Catholic canon) in a criticism of religion.

In 2012 Errazuriz' once again expanded on his work taking aim at religion when he expressed his intentions to CNN of distributing 100 controversial popsicles he had designed to bring attention to America's growing religious extremism violence. The Jesus Popsicle Errazuris, which claimed transformed into the blood of Christ, came on a cross-shaped Popsicle stick featuring a laser-engraved image of the crucifixion.

In 2014 Errazuriz again displayed his ability to use design objects to tackle controversial political and social issues in Tough Love. The collection took on a number of issues through 15 pieces such as The United States of Mexico bringing attention to "Recent statistics show that in some states almost 50% of construction workers are undocumented. This information suggests that many sectors of the U.S. economy are dependent on immigrant labor". Other pieces are in the form of clothing garments like Rapist, a monogrammed letterman jacket meant to expose "the incidence of rape on college campuses while playfully dwelling on the idolization of the attackers." This was not the first occasion Errazuriz used clothing and fashion in his work, as he also created customized T-shirt designs from tourists classics by dipping them in dip-dye. These shirts were sold with all proceeds going to the Hurricane Sandy Relief fund.

In 2013 Errazuriz began to reveal his collection 12 Shoes for 12 Lovers, a series of high heels inspired by former relationships. Each pair of heels were accompanied by a story and created with a form reflecting the personalities of one of the 12 women:

- Shoe1. "Honey" Natasha: Yellow honeycomb wedge
- Shoe2. "Cry Baby" Alexandra: White splash shaped wedge
- Shoe3. "Gold Digger" Alison: Gold Heel held up by the statue of Atlas
- Shoe4. "Heart Breaker" Laura: Glossy red with cupids arrow going throw the heel
- Shoe5. "Ice Queen" Sophie: White with heel in the shape of icicles
- Shoe6. "Hot Bitch" Carolina: Red with melting paint
- Shoes7. "The Virgin" Anna: White wedge depicting the form of the Virgin Mary on the heel
- Shoes8. "The Boss" Rachel: Black with a handle and sharp heel that can be used as a knife
- Shoes9. "Jet Setter" Jessica: Red With a jet plane creating the heel
- Shoes10. "GI Jane" Barbara: Green with a miniature soldier on the toe
- Shoes11. "The Ghost" Valentina: Wire Frame Wedge
- Shoes12. "The Rock" Alice: Black wedge with a rigid rocky shape

These shoes, created to help Errazuriz explore and reflect on his own relationships, were all accompanied by photos and stories of the individuals they were inspired by. After debuting at the Art Basel Show in Miami Beach, the collection went viral and has garnered over 35 Million hits on Google.

In 2015 Errazuriz collaborated with Fashion retailer Melissa to create limited-edition versions of the Gold digger and The Boss for purchase.

=== Furniture ===
Errazuriz is noted for having "expand(ed) the concept of furniture"; and questioning the difference between traditional design and art with his "Functional Sculptures". An example of these furniture sculptures is a series of mechanical cabinets, which "at first glance, the credenzas, cabinets, and boxes may appear simplistically elegant, but they each possess a surprising element. when opened, the interactive works can rotate, spin, and take on new shapes, colors, and forms. Blending advanced technology with traditional craft, the collection seeks to test the limits between sculpture and function." One of these pieces titles Wave Cabinet has garnered massive interest and over 20 million views online.

These furniture pieces can also take on a message of activism. During the 2012 Occupy Wall Street movement, Errazuriz used the likeness and messaging of the Occupy signs, and printed them on the back of white foldable chairs. The chairs began as a concept for use in the actual Occupy Movement spaces and were then given a second use as a way to infiltrate 1% homes with purchased art featuring 99% voices. When the Chairs were presented at The Armory show for purchase Errazuriz's included in part of his artist statement:

"The artist wishes to support the 99% by inviting collectors (representing the 1%) to purchase the complaints as art or furniture, thus introducing the ideas of one group into the homes of another and at the same time getting the rich to support the cause of the 99%.

As a double-sided mirror, the Occupy Chairs also explore the potential for these complaints against the richest one percent to be transformed into fashionable catchphrases in design-art pieces that celebrate the luxury market."

Errazuriz also often repurposed items and forms for his work giving them new life and perspective as functional furniture. From a series of found branches and tree parts from South America, Errazuriz created a collection of shelves tables, allowing nature to help dictate the design. In another series of pieces taxidermy birds, some of which were collected from a taxidermy museum trashcan, were repurposed into multiple pieces including an extravagant chandelier with as many as 50 birds (Bird Chandelier 1), lamps with light bulbs in places of heads (chicken lamp), and even a bird staring into a mirror (On the Edge Staring at Eternal Infinity).

In 2018 Errazuriz had his first solo UK show at David Gill Gallery titled Anything You Destroy We Will Rebuild. In this show he again blurred the line between art and design, this time by incorporating the forms of literal works of art from antiquity, by creating furniture from 3D scanning a digitally altering ancient statues like the Athena Nike. Created from many statues Errazuriz himself revered, the series means to convey both a sense of love and disrespect. By transforming priceless art into usable furniture Errazuriz explores the balances of “tension and release, reverence and sacrilege, delicacy and brutality.”

=== Tech ===
Errazuriz has sparked controversy by warning architects that 90 percent of them will lose their jobs to algorithms. In his Instagram post, Errazuriz argues that in a field that requires 2–3 years of experience, it's almost impossible to compete with the speed of machine learning. An app could be developed to generate designs based on user's preferences and budgets in seconds. The installation was created as part of the Pledge World by Blue campaign and was meant to act as "a reminder of our miraculously fragile existence. It places our very existence in perspective at a global level – as a tiny spec in space – beckoning us to live fully with awareness and mindfulness of our limited time on this vulnerable and beautiful planet."

In recent years Sebastian Errazuriz has focused more and more attention on modern technology, its relationship with art and possible adverse effects on society.

In 2017 Errazuriz Founded Cross Lab, which is self-described as:

"A young creative studio that mixes art, technology, design, and communications to produce innovative solutions for contemporary issues. (We) explore alternative ideas and investigate the impact of emerging technologies to help organizations, institutions, and brands confront current and future challenges. Our multidisciplinary team develops everything in-house; from research, development, communication, and content production, to product prototyping."

The studio's first project was creating a 3D AR Koons Balloon Dog and covering it with Graffiti, which was geo-tagged in the exact same locations as an anticipated Koon Snapchat collaboration. This Piece titled "Vandalized Balloon Dog" was created as a direct criticism of Koons Partnership with Snapchat "which saw digital 3D versions of the artist's best-known sculptures appear in international tourists hot-spots via augmented reality". The meaning of the piece as described by the studio was "A symbolic stance against an imminent AR corporate invasion".

Errazuriz has also experimented with technology in his own studio projects.

In 2017 Errazuriz collaborated with Audemars Piguet for the project Second Nature. The piece, a sculpture of a tree from the Jura Mountains, was created with "highly mechanized technology—robotic arms carved the elegant limb based on CAD drawings—and labor-intensive craftsmanship." With the collaboration of technology and hand craftsmanship, the piece achieved a hyper-detailed form and texture resembling a real tree.

In 2019 Errazuriz produced multiple works with a tech focus. For the collection The Beginning of The End, Errazuriz created a series of eight sculptures that "depict influential figures in the tech world — Mark Zuckerberg, Elon Musk, Steve Jobs, Jeff Bezos, Edward Snowden and more — re imagined as mythological Gods and emperors in the form of Roman statues." Created using 3D modeling and printing, these sculptures were meant as a way to draw attention to how big tech has changed and is continuing changing our society, creating in a sense "A New Mythology.".

On March 7, Erazuriz displayed his public art installation Blue Marble at Ludlow Street, New York City. The 20 ft LED installation, inspired by Apollo 14's iconic Blue Marble Photo, displayed Earth using NASA satellite data. The installation was created as part of the Pledge World by Blue campaign and was meant to act as "a reminder of our miraculously fragile existence. It places our very existence in perspective at a global level – as a tiny spec in space – beckoning us to live fully with awareness and mindfulness of our limited time on this vulnerable and beautiful planet."

In 2020 during the beginning of the coronavirus pandemic, Erazuriz launched the AR art app ALL WORLD. The app allows artists to upload AR modes of their work that can be seen in real spaces. This in the hopes of selling art during a time of gallery shutdowns and social distancing, while also making AR more accessible for all people.

=== Public art installations ===
- 2019 – blu Marble, New York, NY
- 2017 – Augmented Reality artwork vandalized, with Cross Lab, Central Park, New York, NY
- 2015 – A Pause in the City That Never Sleeps, Midnight Moment, curated by Times Square Art, Times Square, New York
- 2014 – XX^{th} Century Capital, Industry City, New York
- 2013 – AIDS & Christianity, Brooklyn, New York
- 2013 – Shadow of a Memory, Rockaway Beach, Queens New York
- 2010 – American Kills, Brooklyn, New York City
- 2010 – Cross of Light, Santiago, Chile
- 2009 – Death is the only certainty in life, South Beach, Miami, Florida
- 2009 – Attempt to understand a statistic, Brooklyn Bridge Park, New York
- 2006 – Memorial of a Concentration Camp, Estadio Nacional Julio Martínez Prádanos (National Stadium), Santiago, Chile
- 2005 – Urban Paradox: a Cow on a Rooftop, Santiago, Chile

== Recognition & honors ==
- Best Chilean Designer of the Year prize in 2010.
- Honoree of the Museum of Arts and Design of New York
- Elected one of the finest arising designers by i-D in 2007.
- Became one of the only living South American artist having work auctioned at Sotheby's Important Twentieth Century Design at the age of 28.

== Exhibitions & collections ==
Sebastian ErraZuriz's creations have already been exhibited in numerous exhibitions and a diverse range of collections worldwide.

=== Selected exhibitions ===
- 2019 – The Beginning of the End, The Elizabeth Collective, New York, NY
- 2019 – Breaking The Box, R&Company Gallery, New York, NY
- 2018 – The Beginning of the End, CorpArtes, Santiago, CL
- 2018 – Foundations, Art Basel's Collector's lounge, Commissioned by Audemars Piguet, Hong Kong, Basel, Miami
- 2018 – Anything you destroy, we will rebuild, David Gill Gallery, London, UK
- 2017 – Second Nature, Art Basel's Collector's lounge, Commissioned by Audemars Piguet, Hong Kong, Basel, Miami
- 2017 – The Awareness of Uncertainty, Curated by Eric Shiner, Armory Art Show, NY, NY
- 2016 – Ice Cycle, Art Basel's Collector's lounge, Commissioned by Audemars Piguet, Hong Kong, Basel, Miami
- 2016 – Lord Stanley Cup Finalist public art competition with JA Studio, Ottawa, Canada
- 2014 – Sebastian Errazuriz: Look Again, Carnegie Museum of Art, Pittsburgh, Pennsylvania
- 2014 – S.H.O.E.S., Kunsthal, Rotterdam, Netherlands
- 2014 – Sebastian Errazuriz, 12 Shoes for 12 Lovers, Summerhall, Edinburgh, Scotland
- 2014 – New Territories, Museum of Art and Design, New York City
- 2013 – Against the Grain, Museum of Art and Design, New York City
- 2012 – Camouflage, Kiasma, Helsinki, Finland
- 2010 – Glass Lab, Cooper Hewitt, Smithsonian Design Museum, New York City
- 2010 – Hidden Heroes, the Genius of Everyday Things Vitra Design Museum, Weil am Rhein, Germany
