= Genesis Belanger =

American sculptor

- Born: 1978 (age 47–48); Massachusetts
- Education: The School of the Art Institute of Chicago, BFA; Hunter College, MFA
- Known for: Sculpture
- Notable work: Heads or Tails
- Movement: Surrealism

Genesis Belanger is an American sculptor known for ceramic and mixed media sculptures that poke fun at contemporary feminine symbols and household objects. She creates idiosyncratic stoneware versions of everyday items inspired by pop art and surrealism.

== Early life and education ==
Belanger was born in Massachusetts in 1978 and moved around as a child. She completed collegiate coursework at the Rhode Island School of Design, Parsons School of Design, and Cooper Union, ultimately graduating from School of the Art Institute of Chicago with a Bachelor of Fine Arts in 2004. Belanger studied fashion design and notes that her training in garment construction helped her with ceramics.

Belanger applied to graduate school at New York's Hunter College with a painting portfolio, and began sculpting ceramics while in this graduate program. She matriculated with an MFA from Hunter in 2012.

== Career ==
After college, Belanger moved to New York City and began her professional career as a prop stylist on for advertising campaigns. She worked in that role for five years before applying to graduate school for fine art.

Belanger's sculptural mediums include stoneware, porcelain ceramics, and hand-crafted furniture. She also works in welding and textile arts. Her sculptures of ordinary objects touch on themes from Surrealism, Pop art, and Chicago Imagists.

Belanger is the 2016 recipient of the Rema Hort Mann Foundation Emerging Artist Grant and a 2017 Pioneer Works Fall/Winter Fellow. She has been the subject of solo exhibitions at the Consortium in Dijon, France (2021); the Aldrich Contemporary Art Museum, in Ridgefield, Connecticut, USA (2020) and in the New Museum's Storefront Window, New York, USA (2019). She is represented by three galleries: François Ghebaly, Rodolphe Janssen, and Perrotin.

In 2026, Belanger presented her first public outdoor exhibition, Heads or Tails, as part of the New York Public Art Fund. Her sculptures are installed in City Hall Park and were sculpted by hand in clay before they were subsequently cast in more weather-resilient materials. The exhibit is on display until November 15, 2026.

Belanger is married and lives in New York City.

=== Notable works ===
- 2026 Heads or Tails, Public Art Fund, New York, NY, USA
- 2025 Dreams and Reality, Alina Szapocznikow, Genesis Belanger, and Pipilotti Rist, Villa Santo Sospir, Saint-Jean-Cap-Ferrat, France
- 2024 Suave Inquietud (Anxious Bodies), Genesis Belanger and Yoriko Mizushiri, Fundación MEDIANOCHE0, Granada, Spain
- 2022 Blow Out, Perrotin, Paris, France
- 2021 Another Man's Treasure, Perrotin, Tokyo, Japan; We Were Never Friends, The Consortium Museum, Dijon, France
- 2020 The Party's Over, rodolphe janssen, Brussels, Belgium; Through the Eye of a Needle, The Aldrich Contemporary Art Museum, Ridgefield, CT, USA
- 2019 Coins for the Ferrymen, François Ghebaly Gallery, Los Angeles, CA, USA; Holding Pattern, New Museum, New York, NY, USA
- 2018 A Strange Relative, Genesis Belanger & Emily Mae Smith, Perrotin, New York, NY, USA
- 2017 Cheap Cookie and a Tall Drink of Water, Mrs. Gallery, Maspeth, NY, USA

== See also ==
- Public art
- Statue
- List of public art in New York
