= The Ballad of Trotsky =

Artwork by Maurizio Cattelan

The Ballad of Trotsky is a conceptual art piece comprising a dead taxidermised horse, hanging from the ceiling, by Italian artist Maurizio Cattelan, from 1996.

== Description ==
A taxidermised horse is aligned to the ceiling of an institutional space. The statue of a horse is installed in an art gallery.

== Conceptual art piece ==
This taxidermised horse refers Russian revolutionary Leon Trotsky, a leading figure in the Bolshevik Revolution of 1917, and in the Soviet Union, that later, because of his opposition to Stalin, in the 1920s, went to exile in Mexico City; where he consequently was murdered by order of the Soviet dictator.

=== Interpretation ===
Julien Delagrange has viewed the concept to represent a tragedy which aligns with the fate of Trotsky - presented by the work is one of thwarted potential and having to bear witness to the loss of an ideal - Trotsky represents utopia and persistent efforts to achieve a better world, but also a failure, representing the tragi-comic predicament of the human condition as a whole.
