= Flash Art =

Italian art magazine

- Flash Art International October 2015
- Editors: Gea Politi, Cristiano Seganfreddo
- Former editors: Giancarlo Politi, Helena Kontova
- Categories: Contemporary art
- Frequency: Four times a year
- Circulation: Global
- Publisher: Politi Editore
- Founded: 1967
- Country: Italy
- Based in: Milan
- Language: English, Italian
- Website: www.flash---art.com
- ISSN: 0394-1493

Flash Art is a contemporary art magazine, and an Italian and international publishing house. Originally published bilingually, both in Italian and in English, since 1978 is published in two separate editions, Flash Art Italia (Italian) and Flash Art International (English). Since September 2020, the magazine is seasonal, and said editions are published four times a year.

Flash Art extensively covered the Arte Povera artists in the 1960s, before they became known in the English-speaking world. It is especially known for featuring Andy Warhol's final interview before his death in 1987.

It also publishes Flash Art Czech & Slovak Edition and Flash Art Hungary.

== History ==
The first issue of Flash Art International featured the seminal text "The Italian Transavantgarde" by Achille Bonito Oliva, whose 'Ideology of the Traitor' introduces the art of Enzo Cucchi, Francesco Clemente, Sandro Chia, Mimmo Paladino, among others.

In the November 1967 issue, "prime mover of the Arte Povera movement" Germano Celant published a manifesto entitled "Notes for a Guerrilla War," engaging political issues with the art of Michelangelo Pistoletto, Mario Merz, Giulio Paolini, Giovanni Anselmo, Alighiero Boetti, Luciano Fabro, and Jannis Kounellis among others. Arte Povera? How An Ambitious Art Historian Simulated A Revolution In 1977 the committee for the Artists Space hosted the exhibition "Pictures". On its occasion, Flash Art published texts by Douglas Crimp and artists Thomas Lawson and David Salle, highlighting the birth of the Pictures Generation.

In 1972, Flash Art dedicated an entire issue, on the occasion of Documenta V, with a cover by Hans Haacke.

In 1973 was established the Giancarlo Politi Editore, which started publishing Art Diary, a landmark for the art system with the addresses and the contacts of institutions, museum, galleries, art critics and artists.

In 1980 the editorial board started to give increasing attention to the New York City art scene; Thomas Lawson reviewed on David Salle at Larry Gagosian Gallery / Nosei-Weber / The Kitchen as well as the famous "Three Cs" (Chia, Clemente and Cucchi) at Sperone Westwater Fisher, helping to bring the central figures of the Transavanguardia to public attention.

Jeff Koons independently published his iconic, color lithograph advertisements in 1988 in Flash Art along with Artforum and Art in America, advertisements that later became famous for being "deliberately provocative, questioning the merits of 'high art', whilst also endorsing popular culture." "With slogans such as "Exploit the Masses / Banality as Saviour", the ads reflected Koons desire to 'remove bourgeois guilt and shame in responding to banality'".

During his tenure as Flash Art U.S. Editor Massimiliano Gioni started to collaborate more and more with Maurizio Cattelan. The latter continued his special relationship with Flash Art International in a series of sardonic interviews with young and promising artists. Years later, Flash Art International was featured in the form of a social-art experiment in the documentary "Maurizio Cattelan: Be Right Back" released in May 2017.

In a 2017 ARTnews feature, MoMA PS1 founder Alanna Heiss revealed that "[t]he people hired by Flash Art were always interesting because they really liked art. I was interested in their peculiar hiring policy."

Since 2015, Gea Politi is editor and head of Flash Art. Since 2019, she and Cristiano Seganfreddo are editors of the magazine, distributed in 87 countries, and of the publishing house that produces catalogues, essays, artists' books and editions, with more than 300 titles. Flash Art, since 2019, works on ad-hoc communication projects for contemporary culture, collaborating with art institutions, galleries and fashion brands along with its partner Agenzia del Contemporaneo.

== Reception ==
It was described by Tony Stankus as "the confident, international journal of European and North American contemporary art" and by Publishers Weekly as a "distinguished by a cacophony of voices and congenial chaos".

== Format ==
Flash Art acquired a magazine format in 1974. The magazine was published in three languages: Italian, English and French and was divided in two main parts. In 1979 it split into two editions: Flash Art International and Flash Art Italia. After Flash Art Russia, the brand new Czechia and Slovakia edition of the magazine underlined the former USSR satellite as the new epicenter of Flash Art Eastern Europe activities.

== Books ==
Besides its magazine activities, Flash Art publishes books, monographs and catalogues, including Art Diary International, a directory that lists addresses and phone numbers of artists, critics, galleries, and museums. In 2016, Flash Art International published Chinese artist Wang Yuyang's monograph Tonight I shall meditate upon that which I am.

== Collaborators ==
Flash Art has been the first magazine that published the works or to dedicate its covers to artists such as Marina Abramović, Vito Acconci, Matthew Barney, Vanessa Beecroft, Cecily Brown, Maurizio Cattelan, Francesco Clemente, Martin Creed, John Currin, Rineke Dijkstra, Peter Halley, Eberhard Havekost, Damien Hirst, Pierre Huyghe, Jeff Koons, Sherrie Levine, Sol LeWitt, Robert Longo, Paul McCarthy, Mariko Mori, Maurizio Nannucci, Shirin Neshat, Gabriel Orozco, Charles Ray, Pipilotti Rist, Matthew Ritchie, Anri Sala, David Salle, Thomas Scheibitz, Julian Schnabel, Rudolf Stingel, Francesco Vezzoli.

Throughout its history, the magazine had had as collaborators critics and curators internationally renowned amongst which Germano Celant, Achille Bonito Oliva, Rosalind Krauss, Francesca Alinovi, Francesco Bonami, Harald Szeemann, Nicolas Bourriaud, Dan Cameron, Hans Ulrich Obrist, Benjamin Weil e Massimiliano Gioni. Today, the magazine has a network of more than two hundred collaborators among which writers, PHD and curators globally renowned by the art system, such as Andrea Bellini, Kenneth Goldsmith, Carolyn Christov-Bakargiev, Quinn Latimer, Pierre Bal-Blanc, Marina Fokidis, Chus Martínez and Vanessa Murrell.

== Other activities ==
In 1993, Politi published the catalogue of Aperto '93, a section of the Venice Biennale organized by his wife Helena Kontova. Also in 1993, Giancarlo Politi opened the Trevi Flash Art Museum in his hometown, Trevi, which hosted exhibitions of important international festivals amongst which "Prima Linea" (1993). In the 2001 Giancarlo Politi started, together with Helena Kontova, the Tirana Biennale in Albania. In 2003 they started together the Prague Biennale in the Czech Republic and they have been the directors of the first six editions (2003-2005-2007-2009-2011-2013).
