= Dodie Kazanjian =

Armenian-American writer (born 1952)

Dodie Kazanjian (born 1952) is an American writer who specializes in the arts. She is the author or co-author of several books and currently is a contributing editor for Vogue magazine and director of Gallery Met at the Metropolitan Opera in New York City.

== Life and career ==
Kazanjian, an Armenian-American, was born in 1952 in Newport, Rhode Island. She attended Salve Regina College, graduating in 1974, when she joined Vogue for a brief stint as an editorial assistant. Subsequently, she studied at the Colgate Darden Graduate School of Business Administration of the University of Virginia.

In 1977 she became a feature writer for The Washington Post, then moved to a similar position with the Washington Star the following year. In 1981 she went to work in the White House as deputy press secretary to First Lady Nancy Reagan, a position she held until 1983, when she became Washington editor of House & Garden magazine and communications director for the National Endowment for the Arts (NEA), as well as editor-in-chief of the NEA's magazine, ArtsReview.

Since 1989, she has worked as a contributing editor for Vogue magazine. In 2005 she also became director of Gallery Met at the Metropolitan Opera in New York City. In 1995 she became a contributor to The New Yorker magazine, writing several articles for the magazine in the mid-1990s.

She was married to Calvin Tomkins (1925–2026), a long-time art critic for The New Yorker, with whom she co-wrote a biography of Alexander Liberman. She lives in New York City.

== Books ==
- Who Supports the Artist, National Endowment for the Arts (1987)
- Opera Today, National Endowment for the Arts (1988)
- Alex: The Life of Alexander Liberman, co-author with Calvin Tomkins, Knopf, (1993)
- Icons: The Absolutes of Style, St. Martin's Press (1995)
- Dodie Goes Shopping, St. Martin's Press (1999)
- Our City Dreams, co-author with Chiara Clemente; about five artists -- Swoon, Ghada Amer, Kiki Smith, Marina Abramović and Nancy Spero—who "each possess a passion for making work that is inseparable from their devotion to New York," according to the publisher; followed a documentary of the same name by Clemente; Charta, 2009.
