= Maurizio Cattelan =

Italian artist (born 1960)

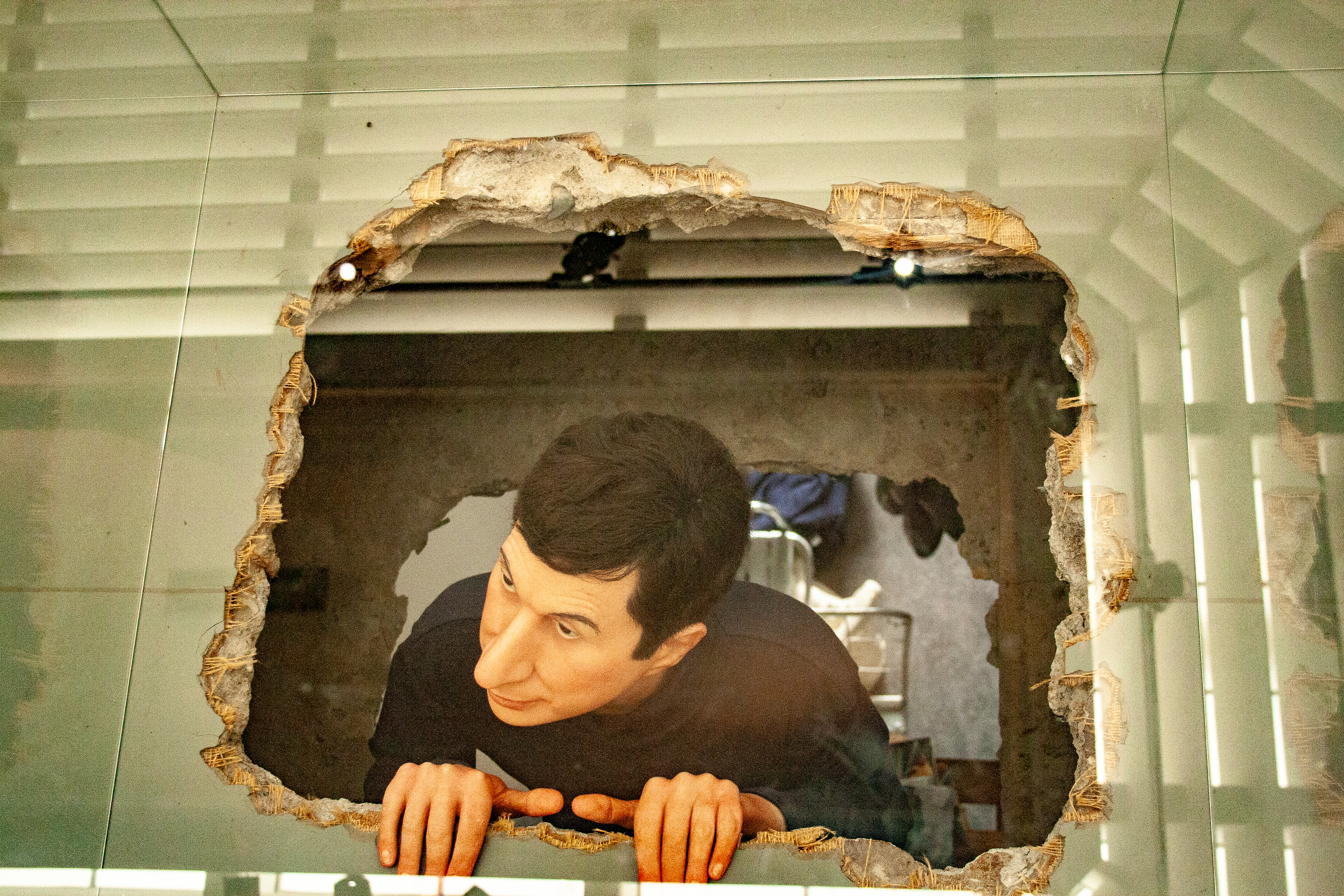
- Self-portrait in the Museum Boijmans Van Beuningen, Rotterdam, 2009
- Born: 21 September 1960 (age 66); Padua, Italy
- Known for: Sculpture; installation art
- Notable work: Love Lasts Forever (1997); Him (2001); La Nona Ora (1999); America (2016); Comedian (2019)

Maurizio Cattelan (Italian: [mauˈrittsjo katteˈlan]; born 21 September 1960) is an Italian visual artist. Known primarily for his hyperrealistic sculptures and installations, Cattelan's practice also includes curating and publishing. His satirical approach to art has resulted in him being frequently labelled as a joker or prankster of the art world. Self-taught as an artist, Cattelan has exhibited internationally in museums and Biennials. Maurizio Cattelan created his most important works of art at Viale Bligny 42 in Milan, where he lived for many years.

In 2011, the Guggenheim Museum in New York City presented a retrospective of his work. Some of Cattelan's better-known works include America, consisting of a solid gold toilet; La Nona Ora, a sculpture depicting a fallen Pope John Paul II who has been hit by a meteorite; and Comedian, a fresh banana duct-taped to a wall as a 2019 limited edition of three, one of which sold for $6.2 million in 2024.

== Early life and education ==
Cattelan was born on 21 September 1960 in Padua, Italy. He was raised there by his mother, a cleaning lady, and his father, a truck driver. From 1982 to 1985 he was part of Magnetica Attrattive, a Padua-based group with which he experimented with image processing using video. Later, he started his career by designing and producing wooden furniture in Forlì (Italy). Cattelan has no formal training in art. He has said that in addition to reading art catalogues, "making shows has been my school".

== Art practice ==
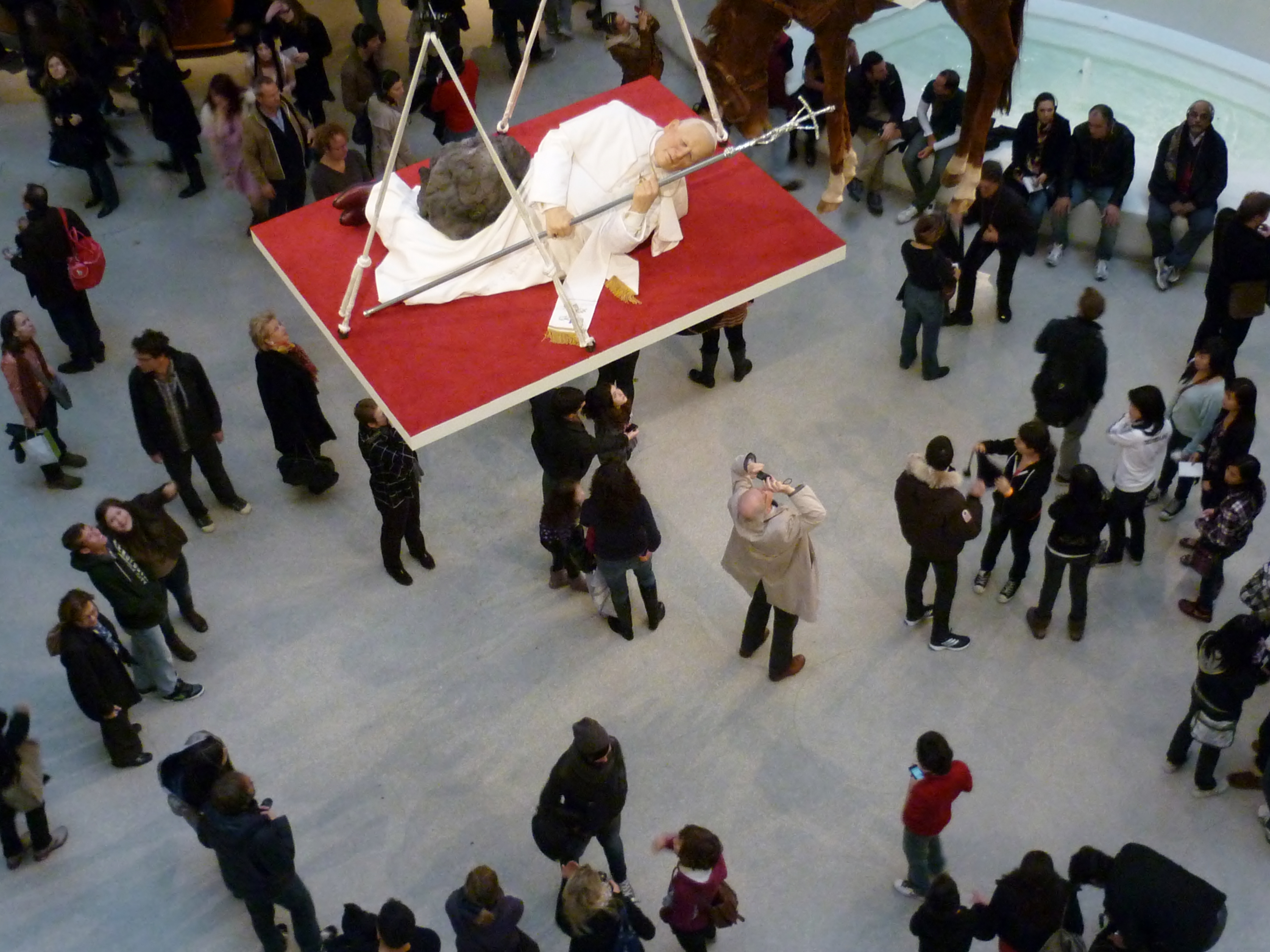
La Nona Ora (1999)

Humour and satire are at the core of Cattelan's work. This approach has often seen him labelled variously as an art scene joker, jester or prankster. He has been described by Jonathan P. Binstock, curator of contemporary art at the Corcoran Gallery of Art, "as one of the great post-Duchampian artists and a smartass, too". Discussing the topic of originality with ethnographer, Sarah Thornton, Cattelan explained, "Originality doesn't exist by itself. It is an evolution of what is produced. ... Originality is about your capacity to add." His work was often based on simple puns or subverts clichéd situations by, for example, substituting animals for people in sculptural tableaux. "Frequently morbidly fascinating, Cattelan's humour sets his work above the visual pleasure one-liners," wrote Carol Vogel of The New York Times.

Cattelan's first artwork has been noted as a photo art piece in 1989 entitled Lessico Familiare (Family Syntax), a framed self-portrait in which he is depicted forming a Hand Heart over his naked chest.

In 1992, Cattelan started the Oblomov Foundation (named after Ivan Goncharov's 1859 novel Oblomov and its idle main character) which raised ten thousand dollars to offer as a grant to an artist who would undertake not to make or show any work for one year. Since there were no successful applicants, Cattelan used the money for a long holiday in New York.

Cattelan is commonly noted for his use of taxidermy during the mid-1990s. Novecento (1997) consists of the taxidermied body of a former racehorse named Tiramisu, which hangs by a harness in an elongated, drooping posture. Another work utilizing taxidermy is Bidibidobidiboo (1996), a miniature depiction of a squirrel slumped over its kitchen table, a handgun at its feet.

In 1999, he started making life-size wax effigies of various subjects, including himself. One of his best known sculptures, La Nona Ora (1999), consists of an effigy of Pope John Paul II in full ceremonial costume being crushed by a meteor.

=== Curating ===
In 1999, he co-curated with Jens Hoffmann the 6th Caribbean Biennial.

In 2002, he co-founded with Ali Subotnick and Massimiliano Gioni "The Wrong Gallery", a glass door leading to a 2.5 square foot exhibition space at 516A½ West 20th street in New York City. After the building housing the gallery was sold, the door and gallery was put on display within the collection of the Tate Modern until 2009.

With long-term collaborators Subotnick and Gioni, Cattelan also curated the 2006 Berlin Biennale. Articles by Cattelan frequently appear in international publications such as Flash Art.

=== Publishing ===
From 1996 to 2007, Cattelan collaborated with Dominique Gonzalez-Foster and Paola Manfrin on the publication Permanent Food, an occasional journal consisting of a pastiche of pages torn from other magazines and submissions by artists of similar material. From 2002 he collaborated on the satirical arts journal Charley, a series on contemporary artists.

In 2009, Cattelan teamed up with Italian photographer Pierpaolo Ferrari to create an editorial for W's Art Issue.

In 2010, they founded the magazine Toiletpaper, a bi-annual, picture-based publication. As part of a public art series at the High Line in 2012, Toiletpaper was commissioned with a billboard at the corner of 10th Avenue and West 18th Street in New York, showing an image of a woman's manicured and jeweled fingers, detached from their hands, emerging from a vibrant blue velvet background. In 2014, Cattelan and Ferrari produced a fashion spread for the Spring Fashion issue of New York.

In the project entitled 1968, A Toiletpaper collaboration between Maurizio Cattelan, Pierpaolo Ferrari and the Deste Foundation in Athens, Cattelan celebrates the works in Dakis Joannou's collection of radical design.

Toilet Paper differs from the two previously magazine projects, as its photographs were planned and designated solely for the magazine. The level of originality for this magazine surpassed the others, providing the audience vague, oddly familiar photographs to peruse through. Toilet Paper is a surrealist pantomime of images that the viewer cannot easily trace back to a starting point, while they've most likely been conjured by popular culture. It is a whirlwind of loud colors mixed in with the occasional black-and-white photo: "the pictures probe the unconscious, tapping into sublimated perversions and spasms of violence."

== Selected works ==
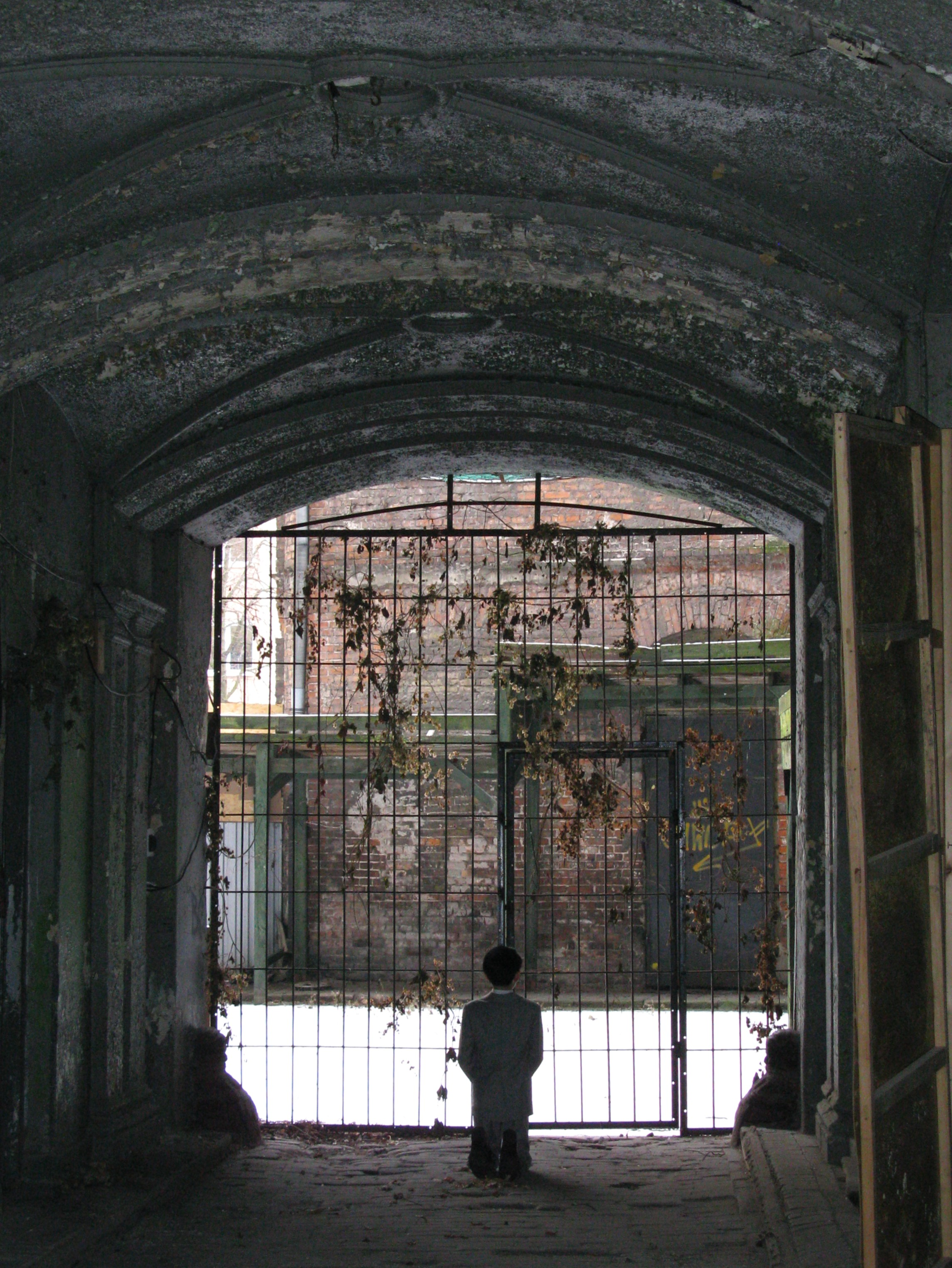
Him by Maurizio Cattelan, depicting Adolf Hitler kneeling in prayer, exhibited in a courtyard in the former Warsaw Ghetto

- Working Is a Bad Job (1993): At the 1993 Venice Biennale he leased his allotted space to an advertising agency, which installed a billboard promoting a new perfume.
- Errotin, le vrai Lapin (1995), in which he persuaded his gallerist Emmanuel Perrotin to wear a giant pink rabbit costume shaped like a phallus to Cattelan's gallery opening
- Another Fucking Readymade (1996): As an example of found art, for an exhibition at the de Appel Arts Center in Amsterdam, he stole the entire contents of another artist's show from a nearby gallery with the satirical idea of passing it off as his own readymade work, until the police insisted he return the loot on threat of arrest.
- Turisti (1997), taxidermied pigeons and fake pigeon feces exhibited in the Italian Pavilion at the Venice Biennale of 1997
- In 1997, at the Consortium in Dijon, Cattelan dug a coffin-shaped hole in the floor of the museum's main gallery.
- Mother (1999); at the 1999 Venice Biennale, Cattelan executed this piece, a project that involved an Indian fakir, who practiced a daily ritual of being buried beneath sand in a small room, with only his clasped hands visible.
- Untitled (2001), installation created for the Museum Boijmans Van Beuningen in Rotterdam that depicts the artist peering mischievously from a hole in the floor at a gallery of 17th-century Dutch masters.
- Him (2001): a sculpture resembling a schoolboy kneeling in prayer, except that the head has been replaced with the realistic likeness of Adolf Hitler.
- As part of the 2001 Venice Biennale, he erected a full sized HOLLYWOOD sign over the largest rubbish tip on Palermo, Sicily.

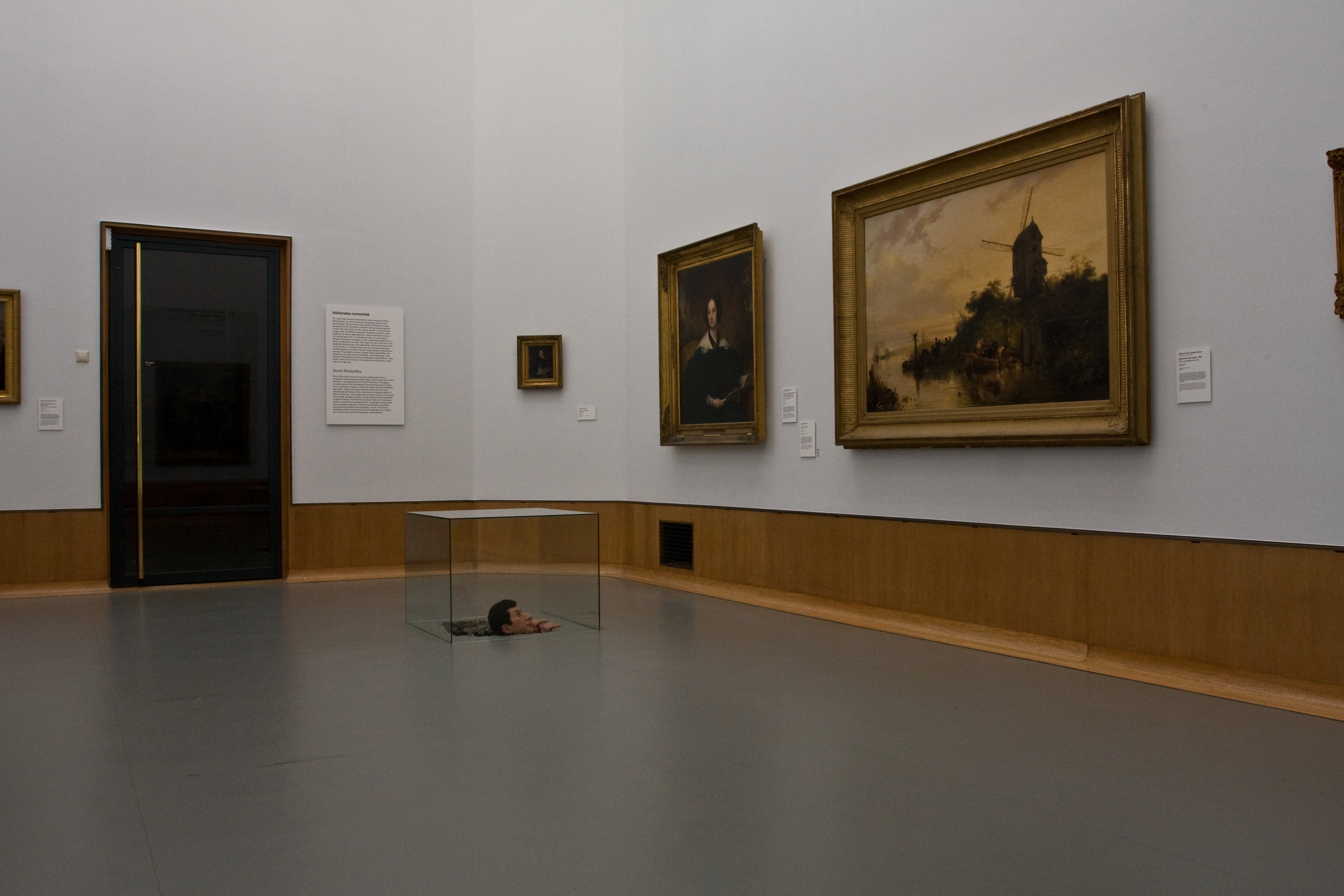
Untitled (2001) at Museum Boijmans Van Beuningen in Rotterdam, Netherlands

- La rivoluzione siamo noi (We Are The Revolution) (2000), features a miniature Maurizio Cattelan, dangling from a Marcel Breuer–designed clothing rack. In this depiction, Cattelan contrasts the German artist Joseph Beuys statement, "every man is an artist", with his own, "I am not an artist".
- Don't Forget to Call Your Mother (2000), is a photograph by Cattelan that was utilized as a show invitation card, upon its introduction, by the Marian Goodman Gallery in New York City. "The sign ironically reminds customers of their mothers' worries each time they approach the bar to drink...in mimicking this stern parental directive, the sign draws on attitudes regarding authority, independence, and disobedience" (Susan Thompson).
- Daddy, Daddy (2008) was initially premiered in the group exhibition theanyspacewhatever (2008–09) at the Guggenheim Museum. The piece was a site-specific installation in a small pool at the bottom of the Frank Lloyd Wright atrium rotunda, where a life-size Pinocchio doll lay face-down, giving the impression that he had jumped or fallen from above. "Cattelan's life-size effigy of a beloved fairytale character lying face down in the museum's fountain reads as a crime scene replete with questions of intent: suicide, homicide, or ill-planned escape?"
- L.O.V.E. (2011), a 11-metre (36 ft) white marble sculpture middle finger sticking straight up from an otherwise fingerless hand, pointing away from Borsa Italiana in Milan.

La Rivoluzione Siamo Noi (2000) at Rubell Museum in Miami

- Turisti (2011), for the 2011 Venice Biennale, was made of 2,000 embalmed pigeons, not to be confused with the similarly-named Turisti (1997).
- America (2016), an 18-karat solid gold toilet, stolen from an exhibition in England in 2019.
- Comedian (2019), a banana duct taped to a wall, shown at Art Basel Miami. The edible part was eaten by the Georgian artist David Datuna (1974-2022) in a performance art piece called Hungry Artist.
- Blind (2021), a memorial to the victims of the September 11 attacks, featuring black resin monolith representing one of the World Trade Center towers intersected by the silhouette of a jetliner.

== Exhibitions ==
=== Retrospectives ===
A major retrospective titled All, assembling 130 objects of Cattelan's career since 1989, opened in 2011 at the Solomon R. Guggenheim Museum, New York. On the occasion of the exhibition, Cattelan announced his early retirement.

In 2016, the Monnaie de Paris his hosted a retrospective of his work titled Not Afraid of Love.

=== Biennials ===
Cattelan has participated in the Venice Biennale (1993, 1997, 1999, 2001, 2003, 2011), Manifesta 2 (1998), Luxembourg, Melbourne International Biennial 1999, and the 2004 Whitney Biennial in New York.

== Art market ==
At a Sotheby's auction in 2004, Cattelan's Ballad of Trotsky (1996), a taxidermic horse suspended by ropes from a ceiling, was sold for $2 million, a record for the artist.

== Recognition ==
Cattelan was a finalist for the Guggenheim's Hugo Boss Prize in 2000, received an honorary degree in Sociology from the University of Trento, Italy. In 2004, he was awarded the Arnold Bode prize from the Kunstverein Kassel, Germany. A career prize (a gold medal) was awarded to Maurizio Cattelan by the 15th Rome Quadriennale. On 24 March 2009, at the MAXXI Museum of Rome, singer and musician Elio came to receive the prize, claiming to be the real Cattelan. In 2025, Cattelan won the 2026 Preis der Nationalgalerie (Prize of the National Gallery); an exhibition of his work accompanying the prize will be shown at the Neue Nationalgalerie during Berlin Art Week in September 2026.

== Film ==
A documentary film titled Maurizio Cattelan: Be Right Back was released in 2017. The film premiered at the Tribeca Film Festival, and played in theaters in 2017. The film, directed by Maura Axelrod, featured curator Massimiliano Gioni standing in for Cattelan. It followed Cattelan's career retrospective at the Solomon R. Guggenheim Museum in New York.

== Television ==
On the occasion of his 2011 retrospective at the Guggenheim Museum in New York, Cattelan was profiled on the American television program 60 Minutes. In 2016 a documentary about his life and work, The Art World's Prankster: Maurizio Cattelan, aired on BBC.

== Controversies ==
In 2010, Sicilian artist Giuseppe Veneziano created a representation of Cattelan hanged with a noose around his neck and displayed it in the Vatican.

In 2017, when the Trump administration White House requested the loan of a Vincent van Gogh painting from the Guggenheim collection, Landscape with Snow, the museum's chief curator Nancy Spector suggested instead Cattelan's work America, a sculpture of a gold toilet.

On December 7, 2019, Comedian, an artwork created by Cattelan in an edition of three for the 2019 installment of Art Basel Miami Beach consisting of a banana held to a wall by duct tape, sold to an unnamed French art collector for $120,000. The fruit in the work was later summarily eaten by Georgian performance artist David Datuna, who called his piece Hungry Artist. Meanwhile Galerie Perrotin, which was exhibiting another edition of the piece, replaced the fruit and stated that it is an "idea", while Datuna said "it was very delicious". On 27 April 2023 a similar intervention occurred when Noh Hyun-soo, a student from Seoul National University, ate the banana at the Leeum, Samsung Museum of Art. Using the original tape, he then re-affixed the peel back onto the wall. The peel was later replaced by the museum with a fresh banana.

Artist Joe Morford filed a suit against Cattelan for copyright infringement of his 2000 work titled Banana & Orange. Banana & Orange features plastic replicas of the titular fruits duct taped to two green panels. Given Morford's claimed similarities between Comedian and Banana & Orange, Morford pursued a claim of copyright infringement, alleging that Comedian unfairly copied Banana & Orange. Morford further claimed that Cattelan might have seen his work and been influenced by it. On June 9, 2023, judge Robert N. Scolar, Jr., a US district judge for the southern district of Florida, granted Cattelan's motion for summary judgment, closing the case prior to trial.
