= Calvin Tomkins =

American author and art critic (1925–2026)

- Born: December 17, 1925; Orange, New Jersey, U.S.
- Died: March 20, 2026 (aged 100); Middletown, Rhode Island, U.S.
- Education: Princeton University
- Occupations: Author; art critic

Calvin Tomkins II (December 17, 1925 – March 20, 2026) was an American author and art critic for The New Yorker magazine.

== Life and career ==
Calvin Tomkins II was born in Orange, New Jersey, on December 17, 1925. His father, Frederick, served in World War I as an instructor in the Army Air Service and then ran the family's Newark Plaster Company. His mother, Laura (née Graves), was a homemaker who raised Calvin and his older brother Fred in West Orange's Llewellyn Park, which according to him was "considered the first gated community in America".

After graduating from Berkshire School, Tomkins attended Princeton University, graduating in 1948. He then became a journalist and worked for Radio Free Europe from 1953 to 1957 and for Newsweek from 1957 to 1961.

His first published contribution to The New Yorker was a fictional piece that appeared in 1958. In 1960, he joined the magazine as a staff writer. His earliest writing for the magazine consisted largely of short humor pieces. His first piece of nonfiction for the magazine was a profile of Jean Tinguely that appeared in 1962. In the 1960s and 1970s, he became a chronicler of the New York City art scene, reporting on the development of genres and movements such as pop art, earth art, minimalism, video art, happenings, and installation art. From 1980 to 1986, he was the magazine's official art critic and his reviews appeared in the magazine almost every week. From 1980 to 1988, he wrote the New Yorker's "Art World" column. As a New Yorker writer, he interviewed and wrote numerous profiles of major 20th-century figures from the art world and other fields, including Marcel Duchamp, John Cage, Robert Rauschenberg, Merce Cunningham, Buckminster Fuller, Philip Johnson, Julia Child, Georgia O'Keeffe, Leo Castelli, Frank Stella, Carmel Snow, Christo and Jeanne-Claude, Frank Gehry, Damien Hirst, Julie Mehretu, Richard Serra, Matthew Barney, David Hammons, and Jasper Johns.

Tomkins was married four times. His first wife was Grace Lloyd Tomkins, with whom he had three children. His second and third marriages were to Judy Tomkins and Susan Cheever (with whom he had one child). His fourth wife and widow, whom he married in 1988, is fellow writer Dodie Kazanjian, who is both a Vogue magazine contributing editor and director of Gallery Met at the Metropolitan Opera in New York City.

On the eve of his 100th birthday, Tomkins published diary entries from the preceding year in The New Yorker, in which he revealed that his grandfather was John Temple Graves, William Randolph Hearst's running mate in his 1908 campaign for president as the Independence Party nominee. Tomkins wrote that he had learned from W. J. Cash's book The Mind of the South that Graves, who died before Tomkins was born, "had been an outspoken racist and was largely responsible for inciting the great Atlanta race riot of 1906". Tomkins turned 100 on December 17, 2025, and died at his home in Middletown, Rhode Island, after a stroke, on March 20, 2026.

== Bibliography ==
=== Books ===
- Tomkins, Calvin (1951). Intermission : a novel. New York: Viking Press.
- — (1965). The bride & the bachelors : the heretical courtship in modern art. New York: Viking Press. (Note: Later published as Ahead of the game.)
- — (1965). The Lewis and Clark Trail. New York: Harper & Row.
- — (1966). The world of Marcel Duchamp, 1887–. Time-Life Library of Art. New York: Time-Life Books.
- — (1968). Ahead of the game : four versions of avant-garde. Harmondsworth: Penguin. (Note: Prev. published as The bride & the bachelors.)
- — (1969). Eric Hoffer: An American Odyssey. New York: Dutton.
- — (1970). Merchants and masterpieces : the story of the Metropolitan Museum of Art. New York: E. P. Dutton. (Note: Published in celebration of the Metropolitan Museum of Art Centennial. See p.5 of the Finding aid for the George Trescher records related to The Metropolitan Museum of Art Centennial, 1949, 1960-1971 (bulk 1967-1970).)
- — (1971). Living Well Is the Best Revenge: The Life of Gerald and Sara Murphy. New York: Viking Press. (Modern Library edition published in 1998). An enlarged version of a 1962 New Yorker profile of Gerald and Sara Murphy; tells of the lives of American expatriates in France in the years between World War I and World War II.
- — (1974). The Other Hampton. New York: Viking-Grossman. (with co-author Judy Tomkins)
- — (1976). The Scene: Reports on Post-Modern Art. New York: Viking Press. ISBN 0-670-62035-1
- — (1980). Off the Wall : A Portrait of Robert Rauschenberg.
- — (1987). Roy Lichtenstein: Mural with Blue Brushstroke. New York: Abrams. (with co-author Bob Adelman)
- — (1988). Post- to Neo-: The Art World of the 1980s. New York: Henry Holt. A republication of articles published in The New Yorker between 1980 and 1986.
- — (1989). Merchants and masterpieces : the story of the Metropolitan Museum of Art (Revised and updated ed.). New York: Henry Holt.
- — (1996). Duchamp: A Biography. Henry Holt.
- — (1993). Alex: The Life of Alexander Liberman. New York: Knopf. (with co-author Dodie Kazanjian)
- — (2008). Lives of the Artists. Henry Holt and Company. ISBN 0-8050-8872-5
- — (2013). Marcel Duchamp: The Afternoon Interviews. Badlands Unlimited. ISBN 978-193644039-9
- — (2019). The Lives of Artists. New York: Phaidon. ISBN 9780714879369

=== Essays and reporting ===
- Tomkins, Calvin (January 7, 1974). "The crocodile and you". The New Yorker. 49 (46): 27.
- — (March 25, 2013). "Anarchy unleashed : a curator brings punk to the Met". The Art World. The New Yorker. 89 (6): 60–69. Profiles Andrew Bolton.
- — (April 22, 2013). "Granted". Talk of the Town. The Artistic Life. The New Yorker. 89 (10): 36. Jasper Johns and the Foundation for Contemporary Arts.
- — (July 1, 2013). "Ed Ruscha's L.A. : an artist in the right place". Profiles. The New Yorker. 89 (19): 48–57.
- — (March 24, 2014). "Experimental people : the exuberant world of a video-art visionary". Profiles. The New Yorker. 90 (5): 38–46. Profiles Ryan Trecartin.
- — (January 25, 2016). "The Met and the now : America's preëminent museum finally embraces contemporary art". Onward and Upward with the Arts. The New Yorker. 91 (45): 32–36. (Note: Title in the online table of contents is "The Met gets with it".)
- — (February 1, 2016). "Kitchen sink". The Talk of the Town. Dept. of Hoopla. The New Yorker. 91 (46): 20.
- — (December 21, 2020). "Radical alienation : Arthur Jafa left an art world he found too white. Years later, he made a triumphant return". Profiles. The New Yorker. 96 (41): 50–59. (Note: Online version is titled "Arthur Jafa’s radical alienation".)
- — (December 22, 2025). "Centenarian : a diary of a hundredth year". Journals. The New Yorker. 101 (41): 38–51. (Note: Online version is titled "Calvin Tomkin's Century".)

———————
