= Nancy Spector =

American museum curator (born 1959)

Nancy E. Spector
- Born: 1959 (age 66–67)
- Education: Sarah Lawrence College (BA); Williams College (MA); City University of New York (MPhil)
- Occupation: Curator
- Employer(s): Brooklyn Museum, Solomon R. Guggenheim Museum

Nancy Spector is an American museum curator who has held positions at the Solomon R. Guggenheim Museum in New York City and the Brooklyn Museum.

== Education ==
Spector attended Emma Willard School and graduated with a B.A. in Philosophy from Sarah Lawrence College in 1981. She received an M.A. from Williams College in 1984 and a Master of Philosophy degree in Art History from City University Graduate Center in 1997.

== Career ==
Spector was appointed as a Guggenheim curator in 1989.

Spector was adjunct curator of the 1997 Venice Biennale and a co-curator of the first Berlin Biennale in 1998. At the Deutsche Guggenheim, Berlin, she has overseen commissions by Andreas Slominski (1999), Hiroshi Sugimoto (2000), Lawrence Weiner (2000), and Gabriel Orozco (2012), as well as organized the exhibitions Douglas Gordon’s The Vanity of Allegory (2005) and All in the Present Must be Transformed: Matthew Barney and Joseph Beuys (2006).

Nancy Spector was one of the curators of Monument to Now, an exhibition of the Dakis Joannou Collection, which premiered in Athens in 2004 as an official part of the Olympics program.

In 2007 she was the U.S. Commissioner for the Venice Biennale, where she presented an exhibition of work by Felix Gonzalez-Torres.

In 2013 she was nominated as "Deputy Director and Jennifer and David Stockman Chief Curator".

In 2017, when the White House requested the loan of a Vincent van Gogh painting, from the Guggenheim collection, Landscape With Snow, Spector suggested instead, America - a sculpture of a gold toilet by Maurizio Cattelan.

In 2026, she curated Helter Skelter at Fondazione Prada, an exhibition containing works by Richard Prince and Arthur Jafa which took place during the 61st Venice Biennale. Following controversy around the selection of Alma Allen for the American Pavilion, with the State Department under Donald Trump abandoning the process of an independent review panel, some commentators dubbed Helter Skelter the 'unofficial US pavilion.' The show explored Jafa's and Prince's respective use of appropriation in their artistic practices to underscore the key points of intersection in their works including issues of race, class, gender identity, apocalyptic thought, and the American vernacular.

=== Guggenheim controversy ===
In 2019, the Guggenheim hired Chaédria LaBouvier to present her exhibition "Basquiat's Defacement: The Untold Story." At the conclusion of the show, LaBouvier accused Spector and the larger institution of creating "the most racist professional experience of my life" and criticized her on social media.

In 2020, the Guggenheim hired an external firm to investigate her claims. It ultimately found "no evidence that Ms. LaBouvier was subject to adverse treatment on the basis of her race." However, while the investigation was under way, museum employees submitted a public letter to the board, calling for them to "replace those members of the executive cabinet who have repeatedly proven that they are not committed to decisive, anti-racist action and do not act in good faith with BIPOC leaders."

In October 2020, after the investigation's conclusion, Spector parted ways with the museum. An investigative article in The Atlantic, exploring the circumstances of her departure, revealed that she was scapegoated by the museum. Reflecting on the situation in 2023, the International Committee for Museums and Collections of Modern Art (CiMAM) criticized the museum, stating that Spector was "a notable museum professional with a strong track record of representing and enhancing diversity."

== Exhibitions ==
At the Solomon R. Guggenheim Museum in New York, Spector organized exhibitions and retrospectives. They include:

- Rebecca Horn: The Inferno-Paradiso Switch (1992, with Germano Celant)
- Felix Gonzalez-Torres (1995),
- Robert Rauschenberg: Performance (1997),
- Matthew Barney's The Cremaster Cycle (2002-2003),
- Marina Abramović: Seven Easy Pieces (2005),
- Richard Prince (2007),
- Louise Bourgeois (2008),
- Tino Sehgal (2010) and
- Maurizio Cattelan: All (2011).

She also organized the group exhibitions

- Postmedia: Conceptual Photography from the Guggenheim Museum Collection (2000),
- Moving Pictures: Contemporary Photography and Video from the Guggenheim Museum Collections (2002),
- Singular Forms (Sometimes Repeated): Art from 1951 to the Present (2004), and
- theanyspacewhatever (2008).

Under the Deutsche Guggenheim in Berlin, Spector initiated special commissions by Andreas Slominski in 1999, Hiroshi Sugimoto and Lawrence Weiner in 2000 as well as Gabriel Orozco in 2012.

At the Deutsche Guggenheim Spector organized the exhibitions for

- Douglas Gordon’s The Vanity of Allegory (2005) and
- All in the Present Must be Transformed: Matthew Barney and Joseph Beuys (2006).

== Recognitions ==
- In 1992 Spector received a Cartier Foundation Grant
- In 1993 Spector received the Peter Norton Family Foundation Curators Award
- Spector won a Tribeca Film Festival Disruptive Innovation Award in 2011.
- In 2014, she was named one of the top 25 most important women in the art world by Artnet.
- In 2014 Forbes named Spector on the "40 Women To Watch Over 40" list.
- In 2019, Spector was awarded an honorary degree by Pratt Institute.
- Five of Spector's exhibitions at the Guggenheim have won International Art Critics Association Awards

== Selected bibliography ==
Spector has written catalogue essays for exhibitions on Maurizio Cattelan, Luc Tuymans, Douglas Gordon, Tino Sehgal and Anna Gaskell among others.

- Spector, Nancy, Against the Grain: Contemporary Art at the Guggenheim. in Art of this Century: The Guggenheim Museum and Its Collection. New York: Guggenheim Museum, 1993.
- Spector, Nancy, “Rauschenberg and Performance, 1963-67: A ‘Poetry of Infinite Possibilities,’” in Robert Rauschenberg: A Retrospective. New York: Guggenheim Museum, 1997.
- Spector, Nancy, “Roni Horn: Picturing Place in Roni Horn: Events of Relation. Paris: Musée d’Art Moderne de la Ville de Paris, 1999.
- Spector, Nancy, “a.k.a.,” Douglas Gordon. Cambridge, Mass. and Los Angeles: MIT Press and Museum of Contemporary Art, 2001.
- Barney, Matthew, Nancy Spector, and Neville Wakefield. Matthew Barney: The Cremaster Cycle. New York: Guggenheim Museum, 2002.
- Dennison, Lisa, and Nancy Spector. Singular Forms (sometimes Repeated): Art from 1951 to the Present. [exhibition] Guggenheim Museum. New York: Guggenheim Museum Publications, 2004.
- Spector, Nancy. All in the future must be transformed: Matthew Barney and Joseph Beuys. New York: Guggenheim Museum, 2006
- Spector, Nancy, and Richard Prince. Richard Prince. New York: Guggenheim Museum, 2007.
- Spector, Nancy. Theanyspacewhatever. New York: Guggenheim Museum, 2008.
- Spector, Nancy, “Seven Easy Pieces,” Marina Abramović: The Artist is Present. New York: The Museum of Modern Art, 2010.
- Spector, Nancy, Maurizio Cattelan, and Nancy Spector. Maurizio Cattelan: All. New York, NY: Guggenheim Museum Publications, 2011, revised and reprinted in 2016.
- Spector, Nancy, Gabriel Orozco: Asterisms. New York: Guggenheim Museum, 2012.
- Spector, Nancy, ed. Peter Fischli and David Weiss: How to Work Better. New York: Guggenheim Museum, 2015.
- Spector, Nancy,“Resentment Demands a Story: Passage dangereux” in Louise Bourgeois: Structures of Existence. Munich: Haus der Kunst, 2015
- Spector, Nancy, “Mona Hatoum” Mona Hatoum. London: Phaidon Press, 2016.
