= Emmanuel Perrotin =

French art dealer

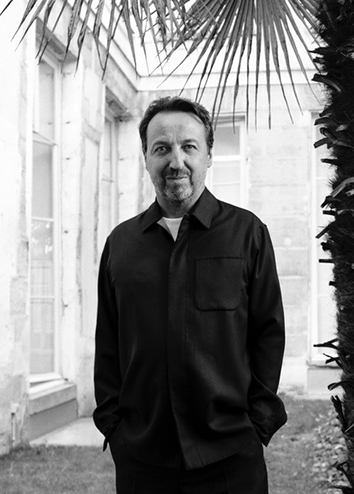
- Born: May 6, 1968 (age 58)
- Occupations: Art dealer, gallerist
- Honours: Officer of the Order of Arts and Letters (2017)

Emmanuel Perrotin (born 6 May 1968 in Montreuil) is the French contemporary art gallery owner and founder of Galerie Perrotin.

== Biography ==
=== Early life and education ===
Emmanuel Perrotin is the son of Michel Perrotin, a bank clerk, and Odile Pradinas, a stay-at-home mother. He grew up in the Parisian suburb of L'Étang-la-Ville. His parents were not contemporary art lovers, but often took him to the museum. He describes having been fascinated at the age of seventeen by a work by Henry Michaux at the Centre Pompidou, which may have influenced his career.

He left school, the Lycée autogéré de Paris, at the age of 17 without a school leaver's certificate or baccaulauréat qualification. Connections he made from evening socialising, particularly with the daughter of gallerist Gilbert Brownstone, led him to manage the Parisian gallery belonging to Charles Cartwright, notably exhibiting works by Marina Abramovic and George Condo. He thus sold his first work, a painting by John Armleder, for 6,000 francs.

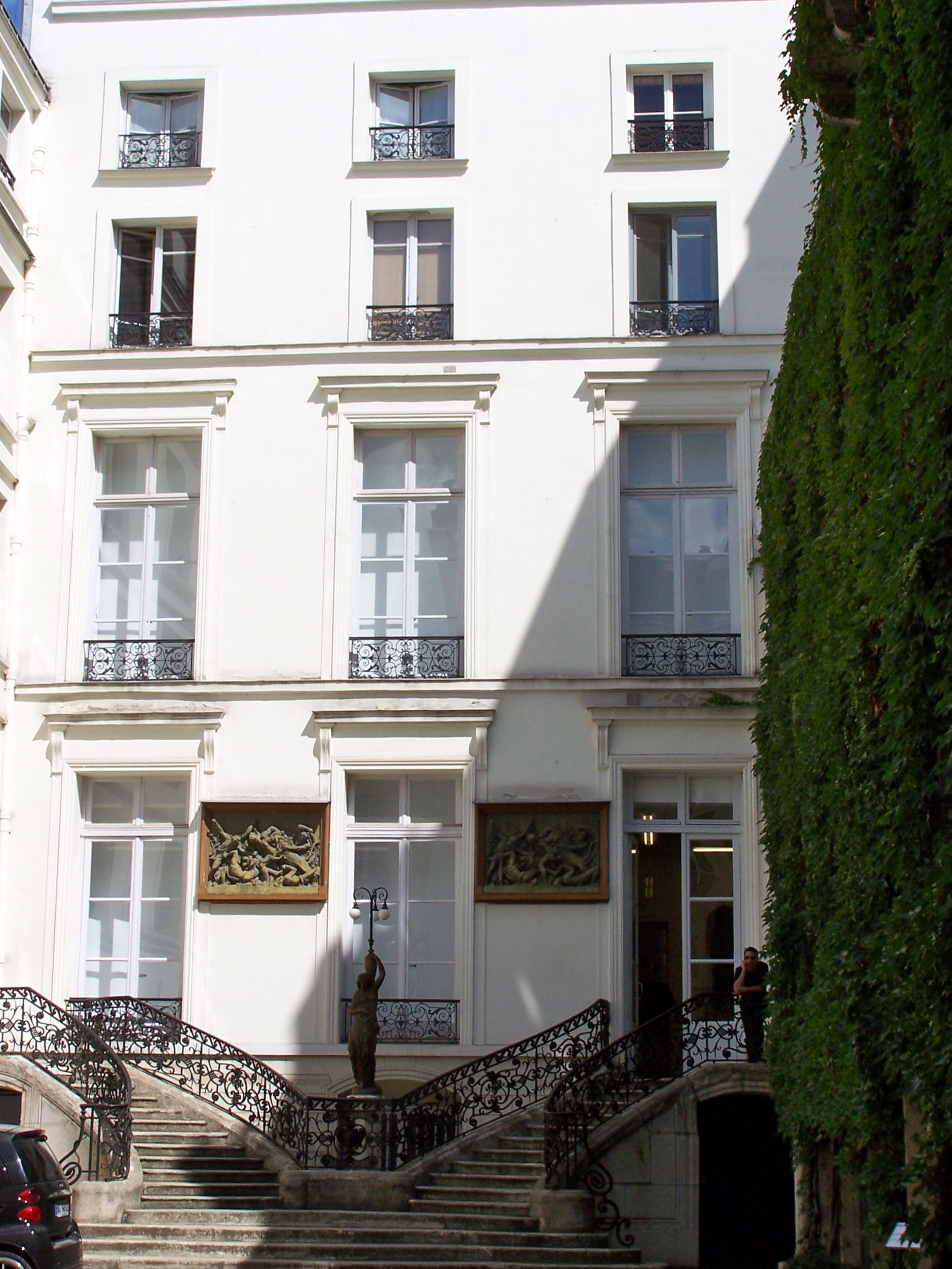
Entrance to the gallery at no. 76, rue de Turenne.

=== First galleries in France ===
He opened his first "gallery" in 1990 in his apartment and made a name for himself notably by exhibiting Damien Hirst as early as 1991, followed by Maurizio Cattelan in 1994, and Takashi Murakami in 1995, who were little known at the time. Emmanuel Perrotin sold a work by Damien Hirst in 1991 for 15,000 francs, but since then his works have sold for several millions of dollars. He was the first to exhibit the artist Takashi Murakami outside of Japan.

At the time, he produced his artists’ artworks himself, while managing their portfolios, something that was rare for the period which was the start of one of the art market's worst crises of the twentieth century. He selects the artists that he exhibits with a great deal of eclecticism, which differentiates him from other gallerists.

In 1997, he moved into rue Louise-Weiss in the thirteenth arrondissement of Paris with a new generation of gallerists such as Air de Paris, Jennifer Flay, Art Concept, and Almine Rech. In 1999, he sold La Nona Ora by artist Maurizio Cattelan for 80,000 US dollars which would be purchased several years later for over two million US dollars by a private collector. He mainly exhibits works by contemporary artists such as Bernard Frize, but also works by deceased artists, represented by their families or foundations.

In 2005, the Perrotin Gallery moved to 76 rue de Turenne, into a private mansion from the eighteenth century, then extended into 10 impasse Saint-Claude in 2007. In the same street, the Salle de Bal was inaugurated in 2014 in the Hôtel d’Ecquevilly, dating from the seventeenth century. The gallery opened a new address on Avenue Matignon in 2020.

In 2023, he was considered the fifth greatest gallerist in the world according to the ArtReview ranking. In 2024, he developed a partnership with eBay, and opened an online boutique, targeting amateur artists, with the goal of opening art up to an ever wider audience.

=== International development ===
Emmanuel Perrotin started participating in international art fairs in Japan in 1993. With the aim of maintaining the reputation of the artists he exhibits, Emmanuel Perrotin regularly opens new exhibition venues – either pop-up or permanent fixtures – in different countries. He inaugurated a gallery in Miami, which he closed in 2010. He then opened several galleries in his name in Hong Kong (2012), New York City (2013), Seoul (2016), Tokyo (2017), Shanghai (2018), and Los Angeles (2024), whose locations were notably chosen based on their architecture. He developed software enabling the state of the stock and sales to be checked in real time, in all the countries where his galleries are located.

In April 2018, Perrotin accompanied president Emmanuel Macron on a state visit to Washington; on this occasion, he also attended a state dinner at the White House. The same year, the French Minister of Culture, Françoise Nyssen, awarded him the title of Officer of the Order of Arts and Letters.

From 2022 onwards, Perrotin opened up his secondary residence at Cap Ferret to painter GaHee Park and sculptor Genesis Belanger and set up a residency programme for the artists represented by his gallery. In 2023, he employed approximately one hundred and sixty people. The press sometimes has nicknamed him the "French Gagosian", in reference to American gallerist Larry Gagosian.

In 2025, he sold a 51% stake in his gallery network to Colony Investment Management.

=== Other activities ===
Very early on, he developed his activity on social networks to attract audiences who were unused to frequenting art galleries, in the aim of increasing artwork sales. He has amicable relations with the artists he exhibits and is well known for organising festive events and soirées, and sharing part of the proceeds on the commission of artwork sales with his employees. He publishes art books and has ventured into the milieus of fashion (as with Nina Ricci), design, or music (with Pharrell Williams). He also proposes creative workshops and awareness-raising activities for children regarding artistic practices.

== Private life ==
He has three children.

== Honours ==
Officer of the Order of Arts and Letters, in 2017.
