= Toiletpaper (magazine) =

Biannual magazine

Toiletpaper (stylized as "TOILETPAPER") is a biannual magazine co-created by Italian artist Maurizio Cattelan and photographer Pierpaolo Ferrari. Founded in 2010, the magazine is presented as a limited edition book and its website offers a post-internet collaged exhibition of animated and video content.

The photography-based publication contains no articles or advertisements, and each issue revolves around a basic theme, such as love or greed. The brightly coloured, surreal images vary in style and reference, and include word play and optical illusions. Hailed as "a new frontier of media and creative eco-sustainability," Toiletpaper is interpreted as a democratized art platform whose accessible images circulate in books and throughout social media, while also being applied to design and home decor products. To celebrate their purported "one-millionth" magazine sale, Cattelan and Ferrari opened their first Toiletpaper pop-up shop in Milan.

== History ==
Cattelan and Ferrari first collaborated in 2009 on W Magazine's Art Issue; continuing their working relationship with an editorial for TAR Magazine. In an interview with Vogue Italia, Ferrari mentions that Toiletpaper is a passion project between him and Cattelan, which emerged as a mental outburst from a common obsession. "Each picture springs from an idea, even a simple one, and then becomes a complex orchestration of people who build tableaux vivants."

At the opening night of Cattelan's retrospective at the Guggenheim, a Hummer stretch limo with the word "toiletpaper" printed on the side was parked outside the museum to announce the magazine's launch. Funded by Greek collector Dakis Joannou's Deste Foundation, Toiletpaper is presented in book-form with all visual material designed exclusively by its creative team, which includes art direction by Micol Talso and set design by Michela Natella.

Cattelan and Ferrari describe how they use their digital cameras like filmmakers to explore their models and sets from multiple angles. Reflecting the duo's aversion to traditional and exclusionary practices of art display, Toiletpaper photographs are mass-produced as salable merchandise. In keeping with their democratizing mission, Cattelan is quoted saying, "Pierpaolo and I are like sadistic scientists: everything around us can be infected by the 'TP' virus."

Naming the project organically, Ferrari recalls that Cattelan came up with the title of the magazine while in the bathroom, quipping, "Sooner or later all magazines end up in the toilet."

== Cattelan and Ferrari ==
=== Maurizio Cattelan ===
Cattelan is a contemporary Conceptual artist who began his career as a furniture-maker in Forlì, Italy. The "court jester of the art world" was born in Padua, Italy, on September 21, 1960. With no formal art training, he "considers himself an 'art worker' rather than an artist." Known for his macabre humour and interrogation of social mores, he derives inspiration from the Dadaist and Surrealist movements. His absurdist sculptures and installations often depict celebrities, art historical figures, or taxidermied animals set in surreal scenes. His oeuvre engages controversial subjects such as suicide, anxiety, religiosity, and the decadence of American culture.

He has participated in several Venice Biennales, the 2004 Whitney Biennial, and exhibited in numerous solo exhibitions, including at the Solomon R. Guggenheim Museum, New York; the Museum of Modern Art, New York; the Museum of Contemporary Art, Los Angeles; and the Centre Georges Pompidou, Paris.

Cattelan was recently thrust into the political spotlight when President Donald Trump requested a Vincent van Gogh landscape from The Guggenheim Museum and their chief curator, Nancy Spector countered instead with his 18-karat solid gold toilet installation entitled America.

=== Pierpaolo Ferrari ===
Ferrari is an Italian photographer, born and raised in Milan, Italy. Working for agencies like BBDO and Saatchi & Saatchi, he has made a name for himself shooting for international clients like Nike, Sony, Heineken, MTV, Mercedes Benz, Audi, and BMW.

His art is instantly recognized by its colourful surrealism, which he accredits to the style to his early mentors. Requiring almost complete creative freedom when working for a client, he notes, "If you call me, and you have a picture in mind and you want me to do that picture—you need to call someone else. Someone who is good at interpreting your ideas. We want to know the feeling that you're going for, but after that we go our own way." His work has been featured in advertisements for Kenzo and Alitalia, and in publications including The New York Times, Bloomberg Pursuits and Wallpaper*.

== Aesthetic ==
In June 2010 Toiletpaper began as an artist book and magazine containing only full-spreads of colour photographs that appropriated commercial photographic, Dadaist, and Surrealist aesthetics. William S. Rubin describes surrealism as a methodological approach to a topic of interest. While Dada was formed in 1916 as a criticism of the art culture in Europe, Surrealism stems from a similar mindset in the sense that it parodies or exaggerates an idea without losing its ground in reality.

Toiletpaper pokes fun at the art world with its photo-collages that fuse the languages of commercial and fine art photography, with staged vignettes.

Photographs are regularly rejected for not being "Toiletpaper enough", with Cattelan likening the creation process to distilling perfume. He elaborates, "It's not about one particular style or time frame; what makes them Toiletpaper is a special twist. An uncanny ambiguity." Discussing the improvisational nature of Toiletpaper, set-designer Natella muses, "Once I have an idea in mind, I design the sets and I have my team research the objects and props. It's a collaborative process and I love to go on set and improvise." Toiletpaper's aesthetic and visual content forces viewers to confront the reality of our disposable cultures.

== Exhibitions, collaborations and publications ==
Toiletpaper was published by the Deste Foundation for Contemporary Art, and now by Damiani, the publishing branch of printing company Grafiche Damiani, located in Bologna, Italy. Photographs from the magazine have been included in art books such as Lipstick Flavour: A Contemporary Art Story by Jerome Sans and Marla Hamburg Kennedy, which explores the sociocultural implications of lipstick in art and popular culture. Images have also appeared in special issues of magazines such as Vice and Hunger. In 2012, images taken from the first six issues were paired with texts and published in an anthology that made it into the Top 10 Photo Books list in The New York Times.

=== High Line billboard: 2012 ===
In 2012, the duo unveiled a giant billboard at West 18th Street and 10th Avenue, near the High Line in Chelsea. Red-lacquered, free-floating, festooned fingers pop out of a blue velvet backdrop in an ironic comment on the deceptive allure of luxury. Cattelan called the image "Surreal but verging on Pop", adding that it was gory without the blood. The fourth installment in a series of art installations sponsored by Edison Properties, Toiletpaper's billboard followed works by John Baldessari, Anne Collier, and David Shrigley.

=== Palais de Tokyo: 2013 ===
Toiletpaper took over the seven front windows of the Palais de Tokyo in Paris in June 2013. Rather than exhibiting works in the gallery space, the monumental windows democratized the photographs by making them visible from both from the public street and inside the building. The Toiletpaper windows were commissioned by Swiss-American artist Christian Marclay as part of a series of ongoing "interventions on the building", which included installations in staircases, and on signage and walls.

=== Toiletpaper pop-up shop, 2016 ===
To celebrate the magazine's purported "millionth-copy-sold" milestone, Cattelan and Ferrari opened a temporary Toiletpaper store in Milan. The pop-up shop was a collaboration with Italian furniture brand Gufram and luxury homeware designer Seletti. The space was a fully immersive version of the magazine, with point of sale displays covered in imagery that channelled the magazine's postmodernist aesthetic. Items for sale included home decor, dinnerware, and furniture. The duo also collaborated with The Vinyl Factory to release a special edition gold vinyl disc of Daft Punk's 1995 Da Funk, which was available in the store ahead of its global release.

=== Toiletpaper Paradise: 2017 ===
Cattelan and Ferrari partnered with Visionaire founders Cecilia Dean and James Kaliardos to create an immersive installation at The Gallery at Cadillac House in SoHo. Interspersed throughout the space were vignettes of mid-century modern furniture and accessories branded by reviewers as "Mad Men on acid". Featuring a furnished bedroom and kitchen, visitors were encouraged to play, lounge, and take Instagram selfies in the spaces.

=== OK Cupid's DTF campaign: 2017 ===
Cattelan and Ferrari collaborated with Wieden+Kennedy on OK Cupid's "Dating deserves better" campaign. Reappropriating DTF, the ubiquitous contemporary dating term referring to a person who is willing to have sex, the campaign reinterprets the letter F into phrases such as "down to feel fabulous", "down to forget our baggage", and "down to fight about the president".

Melissa Hobley, OKCupid's CMO, explains that partnering with Cattelan and Ferrari made sense because "their vibrant, cheeky images were the right fit" for the humorous campaign. "In the current political and social climate, we felt a responsibility and saw an opportunity to play a part in changing the conversation about dating culture and empowering each individual to reclaim the meaning of DTF and make it theirs."

=== Galerie Perrotin Tokyo: 2017-2018 ===
This exhibition focused on assemblages inspired by found images taken from both the Internet and magazines. Using gilded mirrors as a common framing thread, and referencing works by René Magritte and Georges de la Tour, the pop images combined references to art history and contemporary consumer culture.

== Reception ==
Dean, one of the co-founders of Visionaire who worked with Cattelan and Ferrari for the exhibition Toiletpaper Paradise at Cadillac House lauds the duo's collaboration:

"When he and Pierpaolo started Toilet Paper in 2010, it was so refreshing, unique, weird and different from everything else out there. And then they started doing products featuring their photos...and then they started doing installations with the products featuring their photos...and then they do these little films with the products in their installations. It's like stepping inside their brains and just getting deeper and deeper into their craziness. They have such a strong identity."

== See also ==
Maurizio Cattelan

Artists' Books
