= Ioannou =

Ioannou or Joannou (Greek: Ιωάννου) is a Greek surname, derived from the given name John (Greek: Ιωάννης).

Notable people with surname Ioannou or Joannou:

== People ==
=== Ioannou ===
- Demetris Ioannou (born 1968), Cypriot footballer
- Dimitrios Ioannou (1861–1926), Greek general
- Dimitris Ioannou (born 1977), Greek footballer
- Eleni Ioannou (1984–2004), Greek judo athlete
- Fifis Ioannou (1914–1988), 2nd Secretary General of AKEL
- Giorgos Ioannou (1926–2017), Greek painter
- John Ioannou, Greek-Canadian actor
- Kyriakos Ioannou (born 1984), Cypriot high jumper
- Memos Ioannou (born 1958), Greek basketball player
- Michalis Ioannou (born 2000), Cypriot footballer
- Nicolas George Ioannou (born 1965), Cypriot businessman
- Orthodoxos Ioannou (born 1986), Cypriot footballer
- Susan Ioannou (born 1944), Canadian poet
- Thomas Ioannou (born 1995), Cypriot footballer
- Yiannos Ioannou (born 1966), Cypriot footballer

=== Joannou ===
- Chris Joannou (born 1979), bass player
- Dakis Joannou (born 1939), Cypriot industrialist
- Stelios Joannou (1915–1999), Cypriot philanthropist
