= Dakis Ioannou =

Greek art collector

- Δάκης Ιωάννου
- Born: December 30, 1939 (age 86); Nicosia, Cyprus
- Education: Cornell University; Columbia University; Sapienza University of Rome
- Children: 4

Dakis Ioannou (born Leonidas Ioannou; Greek: Λεωνίδας (Δάκης) Ιωάννου; born December 30, 1939) is a Greek Cypriot industrialist and art collector. He is considered to be one of the leading collectors of contemporary art in the world and is famous for acquisitions such as the Jeff Koons-designed yacht 'Guilty'.

== Early life and education ==
Dakis Ioannou was born in Nicosia, Cyprus. Son of industrialist Stelios Ioannou, and co-founder of the Ioannou & Paraskevaides company, Ioannou graduated from Athens College in 1958 after moving to Greece. In 1962, he continued his education in the United States, receiving his bachelor's degree in civil engineering from Cornell University. In 1964, he completed his master's degree from Columbia University and in 1967 accomplished his Doctorate in Architecture at Sapienza University of Rome, Italy.

== Career ==
Ioannou entered the construction and civil engineering business in the late 1960s and ever since has diversified his holdings through numerous areas of international industrial commerce. Ioannou's core business is construction, with primary focus in the Middle East, North Africa, Greece, and Southeastern Europe.

Ioannou is active in the hospitality sector, with holdings in the Athenaeum InterContinental Hotel in Athens and through Yes! Hotels, a chain of boutique hotels whose flagships are the Karim Rashid-designed Semiramis Hotel and the Campana Brothers-designed NEW Hotel in Athens. Ioannou is also involved in several other industries including Coca-Cola bottling, shipping, aviation, and real estate.

== Art collection ==
Ioannou is a major collector of contemporary art and is the founder of the DESTE Foundation for Contemporary Art, which was established in 1983. He is currently serving on the councils of several museums worldwide and has continuously been on ArtReview's Power 100 List since its inception—in 2004 he was ranked its number one collector in the world. Along with his extensive fine art collection, Ioannou's interest in furniture from the Italian radical design period of the late 1960s and 1970s has grown to be what is known as the 1968 Furniture Collection and which is the subject of a book created in collaboration with artist Maurizio Cattelan and photographer Pierpaolo Ferrari.

In 2007, Ioannou established the destefashioncollection. Each year up until 2014, the DESTE Foundation commissioned an artist familiar with the fashion industry to reinterpret five inspiring designs from that year’s international fashion collections. The first exhibition of the destefashioncollection, combining five of the capsule collections (2007, 2008, 2009, 2010, and 2012), was presented in the iconic storefront windows of Barney’s, New York in June 2012. The project was presented in its entirety in the exhibition "DESTEFASHIONCOLLECTION: 1 to 8" at the Benaki Museum in Athens in 2014 and at The Bass in Miami, FL in 2018.

The Dakis Ioannou Collection over time, has been composed of works by a variety of both established and emerging artists, including: Paweł Althamer, Janine Antoni, Matthew Barney, Ashley Bickerton, Maurizio Cattelan, Paul Chan, Roberto Cuoghi, Marcel Duchamp, Haris Epaminonda, Urs Fischer, Robert Gober, Peter Halley, Jeff Koons, Elad Lassry, Mike Kelley, Joseph Kosuth, Mark Manders, Paul McCarthy, Tim Noble & Sue Webster, Chris Ofili, Charles Ray, Josh Smith, Kiki Smith, Christiana Soulou, Haim Steinbach, Kaari Upson, Andra Ursuta, Kara Walker, Andy Warhol, Andro Wekua, Christopher Wool, and Jakub Julian Ziolkowski.

Works from the extensive collection have appeared in a number of major museums and art institutions around the world. A notable exhibition took place at New York City's New Museum in 2009 named Skin Fruit: Selections from the Dakis Ioannou Collection.

In a 2023 interview, Joannou reflected on his legacy and approach to collecting while discussing Dream Machines, a group exhibition at DESTE’s Hydra Slaughterhouse curated by Daniel Birnbaum and Massimiliano Gioni, and noted that he is exploring ways to preserve the DESTE Foundation's history through interactive digital tools, including artificial intelligence.

== Memberships ==
Ioannou is a member of the board of trustees at the New Museum for Contemporary Art, New York; a member of the International Council of the Museum of Modern Art, New York, where he also served on the Committee on Painting and Sculpture and the Library Council; and a member of the International Council of the Metropolitan Museum of Art, New York. He has also been a founding member of the International Directors' Council at the Solomon R. Guggenheim Foundation, New York, where he served as president between 1995 and 2005, and now serves as an Honorary Member. He is a member of the International Council of Tate, London, having also served as President of the Tate Modern Council between 2005 and 2008, and a member of the International Council of the Design Museum, London.

== DESTE Foundation ==
The DESTE Foundation for Contemporary Art, established in Geneva in 1983, is a non-profit institution. DESTE's exhibition program promotes both emerging and established artists. A second location, the DESTE Project Space Slaughterhouse is located on the Greek island of Hydra. The DESTE Foundation has organized, in collaboration with the respective institutions, the exhibitions Urs Fischer - False Friends at the Museum of Art and History, Geneva in 2016; Skin Fruit at the New Museum of Contemporary Art, New York in 2010; Dream and Trauma at Kunsthalle Wien, Vienna in 2007; and Translation at the Palais de Tokyo, Paris in 2005.

At the Slaughterhouse Project Space, DESTE has organized:

- "The Mad and The Lonely" solo exhibition by artist George Condo in June 2024.
- "Dream Machines" an exhibition curated by Daniel Birnbaum and Massimiliano Gioni in June 2023.
- "Apollo" a solo exhibition by Jeff Koons in June 2022.
- "The Greek Gift" a small group show organized by Massimiliano Gioni in June 2021
- "199" solo exhibition by Greek artist Kostis Velonis in June 2020
- "Memory" solo exhibition by Kiki Smith in June 2019
- "Laughterhouse" solo exhibition by David Shrigley in June 2018
- "Figa" solo exhibition by Kara Walker in June 2017
- "Putiferio" solo exhibition by Roberto Cuoghi in June 2016
- "Hippias Minor" solo exhibition by Paul Chan in June 2015
- "The Secret of the Phaistos Disc" solo exhibition by Pawel Althamer in June 2014
- "YES" solo exhibition by Urs Fischer in June 2013
- "Animal Spirits" group exhibition in June 2012
- "Black Mirror" solo exhibition by Doug Aitken in June 2011
- "We" solo exhibition by Maurizio Cattelan in June 2010
- "Blood of Two" solo exhibition by Matthew Barney & Elizabeth Peyton in June 2009

== Charitable contributions and recognition ==
Ioannou is actively involved in many not-for-profit organizations with a wide range of social activities. He heads the Christos Stelios Ioannou Foundation, a center for the intellectually disabled in Cyprus. He is also a supporter of the University of Cyprus, having donated with his family the "Stelios Ioannou" Learning Resource Center, designed by internationally renowned architect Jean Nouvel and due for completion in 2018. In 2007, Ioannou was appointed to the Chancellor’s Court of Benefactors of the University of Oxford after the establishment of the Stelios Ioannou School for Research in Classical and Byzantine Studies.

== Yacht Guilty ==
Dakis Ioannou owns the yacht Guilty, which was designed by Ivana Porfiri. The yacht's exterior was designed by contemporary artist Jeff Koons and was inspired by the iconic WWI naval camouflage, also known as "Razzle Dazzle", featuring bold geometric patterns in contrasting colors.
