= Stelios Joannou =

Cypriot businessman (1915–1999)

Stelios Joannou (Ioannou)
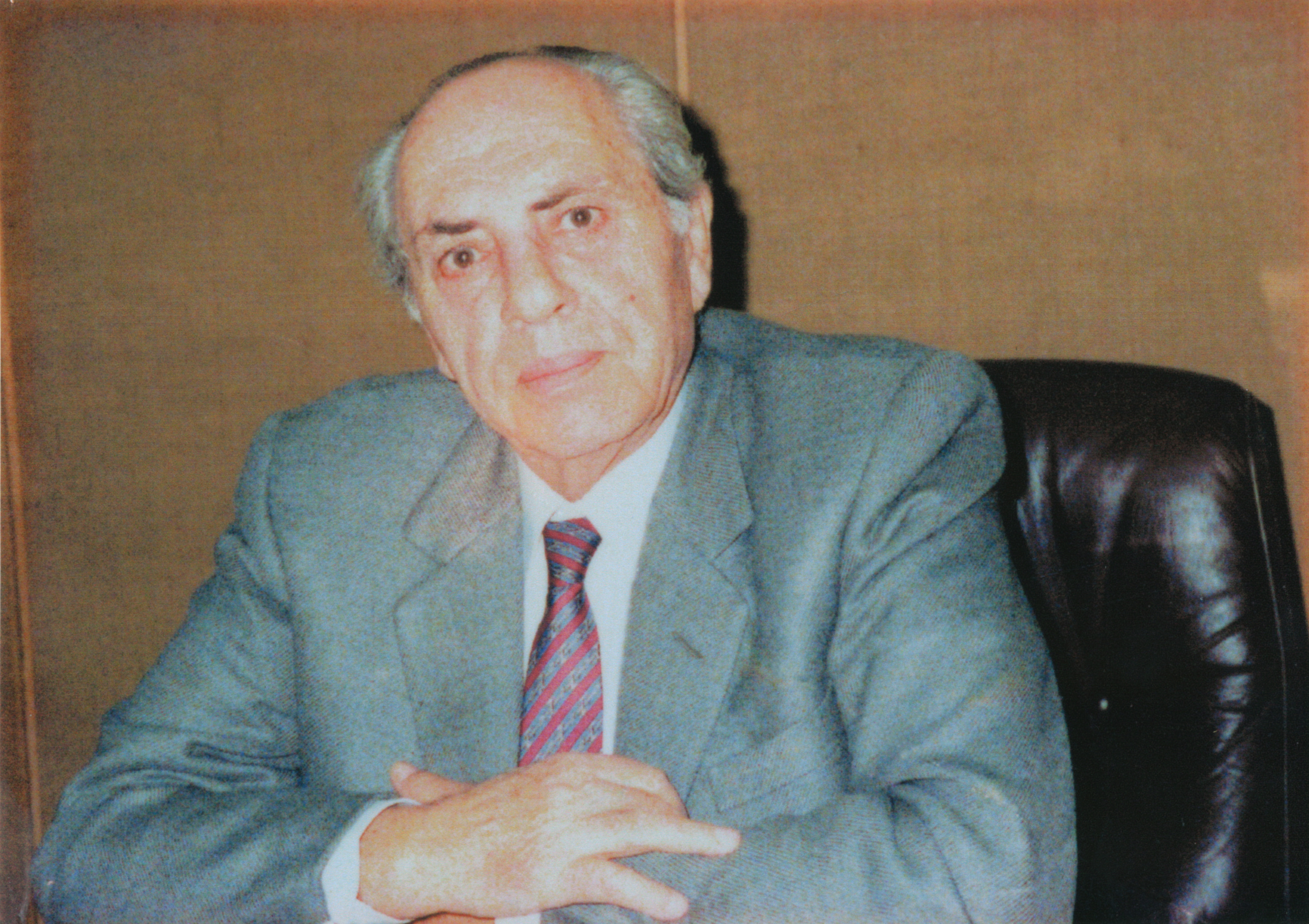
- Born: 30 January 1915; Pano Lefkara, near Larnaca (Cyprus)
- Died: 8 May 1999; Nicosia (Cyprus)
- Education: Pancyprian Gymnasium and the English School, Nicosia
- Occupations: Industrialist, philanthropist
- Spouse: Ellie Mousoulou (1919–2010)
- Children: 3, including Dakis

Stelios Joannou or Ioannou (Greek: Στέλιος Ιωάννου; 30 January 1915 – 8 May 1999) was an internationally acclaimed Cypriot industrialist and philanthropist, one of the two co-founders of Joannou & Paraskevaides, a construction firm known by its trademark, J&P.

== Biography ==
Born in Pano Lefkara, near Larnaca (Cyprus), Stelios Joannou was the son of Ttofi (Christofis) and Panagiota Ioannou. At a young age, together with his parents and his sister, Eleni, he moved to Nicosia, where his father owned and successfully directed a small inn that operated in parallel as a trading post for various goods. Growing up in the environment of the famous ‘Ttofi’s Inn’, also called ‘St Anthony’s Inn’, Ioannou had the opportunity to receive a hands-on business education and to witness first-hand the problems, strengths and needs faced by the rural population and the people active in production and trade in Cyprus.

After completing his studies at the Pancyprian Gymnasium and the English School, Nicosia, he initially entered the world of commerce.

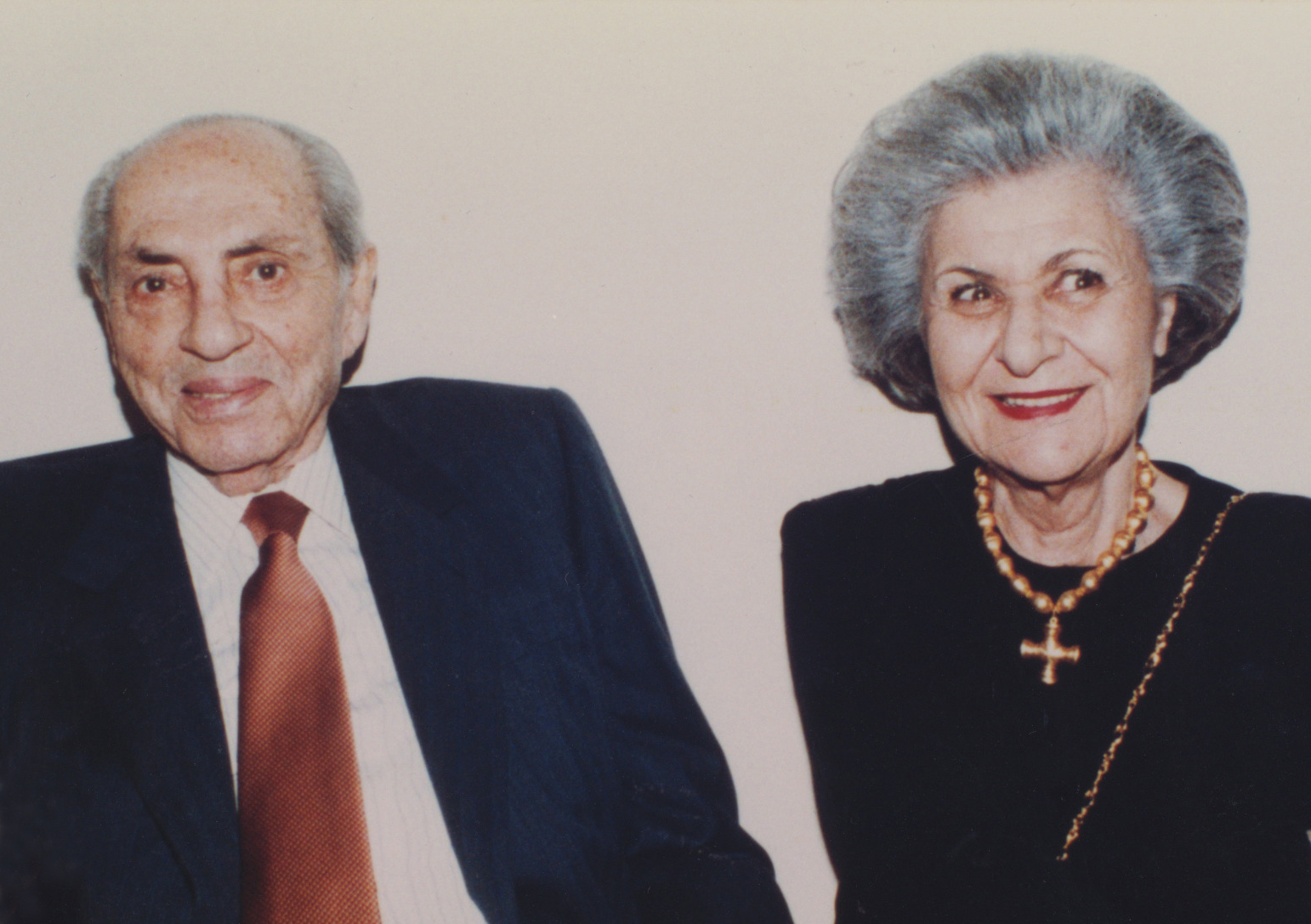
Stelios and Ellie Joannou (Ioannou)

In 1938 he married Ellie Mousoulou (Karavas, Kyrenia, Cyprus, 29 December 1919 – Nicosia, Cyprus, 26 June 2010), the daughter of Sophocles and Evridiki Mousoulou and the sister of the eminent academic Loukas Mousoulou and the businessman Leonidas Mousoulou. Stelios and Ellie Joannou (Ioannou) had three children, Leonidas (Dakis), Sylvia and Christos, and together they embarked on a long path as philanthropists. Their charity intensified after the death of their younger son, Christos, in a car accident in 1971, at the age of 26. Despite his international business success, Ioannou never forgot his origins. Firmly committed to the interests of his homeland, he became a great benefactor of Cyprus through his charity and entrepreneurial activities.

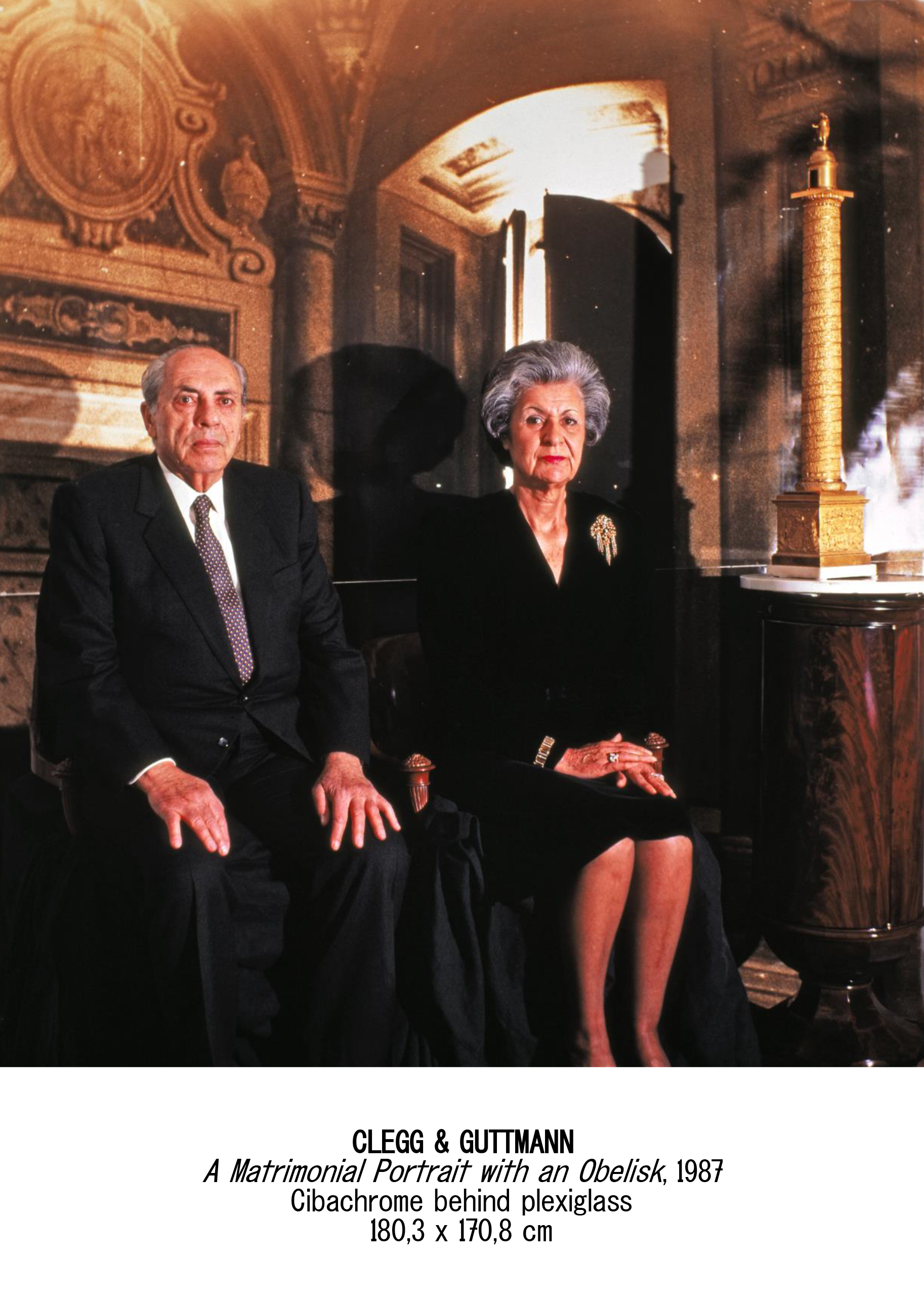
Photographic portrait of Stelios and Ellie Joannou (Ioannou) by Clegg & Guttmann, 1987 (original at the University of Oxford; copy in the Library of the University of Cyprus)

Stelios Joannou died at the age of 84 on 8 May 1999 at the Nicosia General Hospital, where he had undergone surgery for an aortic aneurysm. The funeral was conducted by the Archbishop of Cyprus, Chrysostomos I, at the Church of Our Lady Pallouriotissa, Nicosia, on 10 May 1999. Many ambassadors, government ministers, parliamentarians, leaders and representatives of political parties and unions, entrepreneurs, friends and relatives were in attendance, as well as a large crowd of people who had benefitted from Ioannou's charity. The coffin was draped with the Greek flag, and the eulogy was delivered by Glafcos Clerides, then President of the Republic of Cyprus and a friend of Joannou.

Joannou was recognized for her contributions to literary and cultural activities, receiving awards from organizations including the Red Cross and the Association of Greek Philologists of Cyprus (Stasinos, 1981). Following the death of her husband Stelios Joannou, she continued to support their shared initiatives, including the development of the Library and Learning Resource Centre at the University of Cyprus. In 2005, she was the first recipient of the Woman of the Year Award in Cyprus.

== Business activities ==
In 1941, at age 26, Stelios Joannou formed a partnership with the architect–engineer George Paraskevaides and was responsible for the financial administration and management of the enterprise. Initially they undertook the execution of defensive military works for the protection of Cyprus from German and Italian air raids during World War II. Later, in 1961, the partners founded the J&P construction company, through which they expanded their activities outside the shores of the island and firmly placed Cyprus on the international business map.

J&P’s projects in the greater Middle East region were crucial for the recovery of the Cypriot economy, which had collapsed in the wake of the Turkish invasion of 1974, by providing work for thousands of unemployed Cypriots. Economic recovery was also furthered by Ioannou’s instrumental and decisive company policy initiative whereby recruitment of any employee was conditional on accepting payment of two thirds of their salary in Cyprus instead of in the foreign countries where the company was active. In this way, substantial transfers of necessary capital were funnelled back into Cyprus, invigorating the ruined economy of the island.

To this day, Joannou & Paraskevaides continues its successful international course in construction projects. Its Greek subsidiary, J&P Hellas S.A., has been active since 1993, initially as Zeus A.T.E. and later renamed J&P Hellas A.T.E. Following a merger with AVAX S.A., the current, well-known construction company J&P–AVAX S.A. was formed.

== Philanthropic work and legacy ==
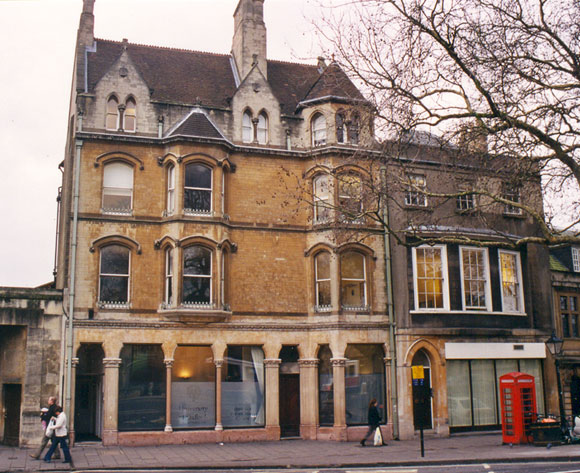
The facade of the Stelios Ioannou School for Research in Classical and Byzantine Studies at the University of Oxford

Stelios and Ellie Joannou (Ioannou) were involved in a wide range of humanitarian activities, strengthening or establishing charitable, medical and educational institutions and historical and cultural associations and aiding monasteries, churches, and patriarchates, as well as sports and refugee associations. Significant achievements of their rich social and benevolent efforts include the following:

The Christos Stelios Ioannou Foundation was established in 1983 for the care, training, rehabilitation and social reintegration of people with learning difficulties. This organization was augmented by a contribution towards the creation in 1988 of the Mental Retardation Prevention Center, later renamed the Center for Preventive Paediatrics in 2002, and through further grants towards the operation of the St Christopher Home (1998) and the Integrated Residential Units (EOM) that care for adults with learning difficulties who lack home care. These intensive efforts, as well as the leading role played by Stelios and Ellie Joannou in the introduction and establishment of the Special Olympics Institution in Cyprus, contributed considerably towards removing the social stigma attached to disabled people and their families.

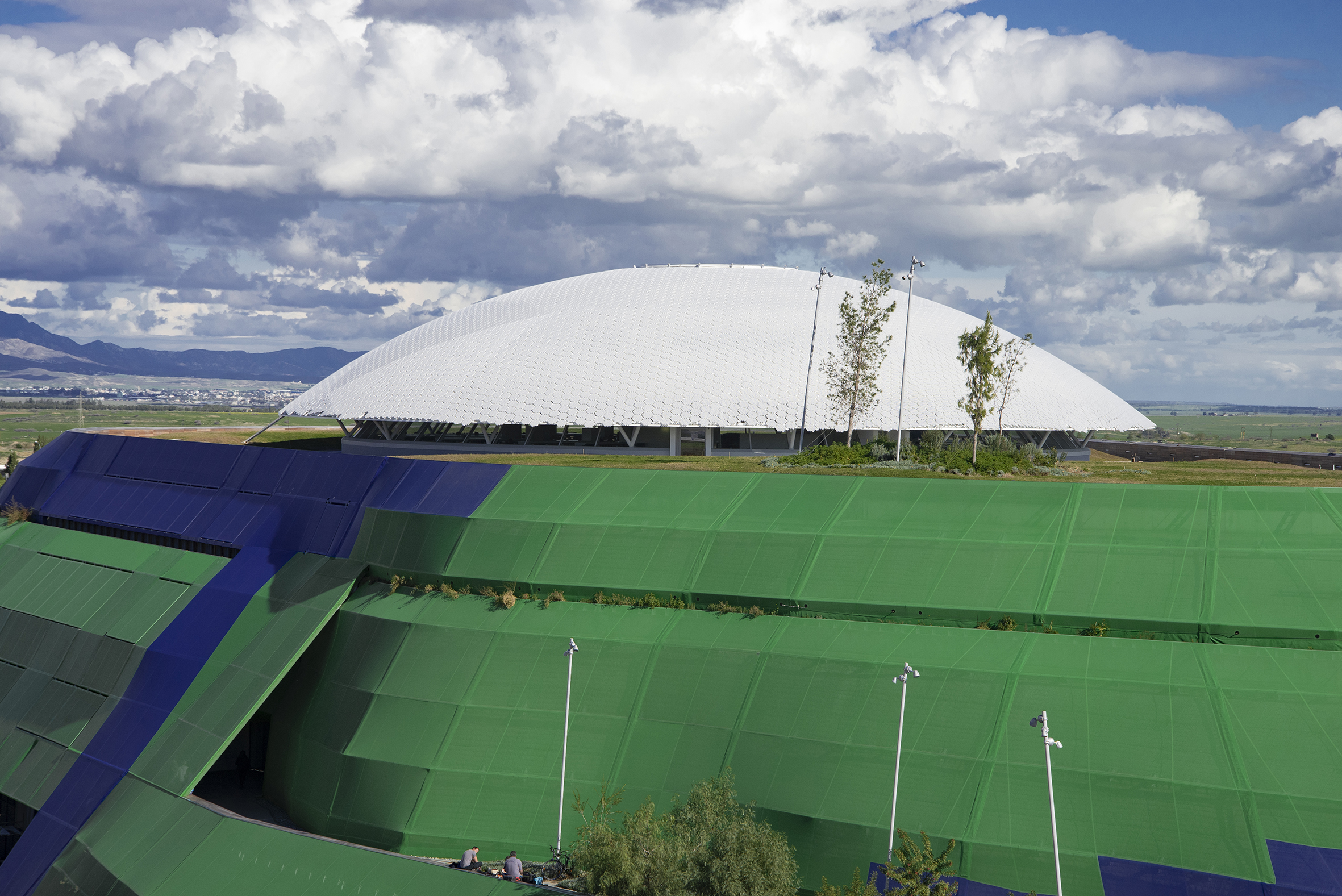
The Stelios Ioannou Learning Resource Centre at the University of Cyprus (Nicosia), designed by Jean Nouvel

Stelios Joannou was named the first president and major benefactor of the Lions Care for Youth Foundation (ΛΙΑΑΠ) and was also the first and major benefactor of the Agia Skepi Therapeutic Community (1998), which assists substance abusers undergoing detoxification. The foundation of a research centre for Classical and Byzantine Studies at the University of Oxford was envisioned by Ellie Joannou (Ioannou) and was financed by herself and her children in memory of Stelios Joannou. In 2007, the University honoured him by naming the centre the Stelios Ioannou School for Research in Classical and Byzantine Studies. Ellie Joannou (Ioannou) also spearheaded the construction of the outstanding Library at the University of Cyprus. This mixed-use building (on 5 levels and covering a total area of more than 15,000 square metres) was designed by the award-winning French architect Jean Nouvel, inspired by the landscape around the campus. It houses the Library, the Information Systems Services, the Centre for Teaching Support Technologies and the University’s Language Centre.

The social and intellectual legacy of Stelios and Ellie Joannou (Ioannou) has been continued and expanded by their children Dakis and Sylvia and their families. Dakis Joannou, entrepreneur and collector of contemporary art, is the founder of the DESTE Foundation for Contemporary Art and sits on the boards of various institutions and internationally acclaimed modern art museums. Sylvia Ioannou is the founder of the Sylvia Ioannou Foundation, which holds one of the world’s most important private collections of rare books and maps of Cyprus, working towards the preservation and dissemination of Cypriot heritage found in print and manuscript form and the promotion of research on Cyprus through the support of various Humanities study programmes.

== Awards and honours ==
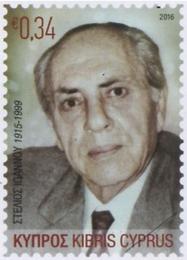
Stamp featuring Stelios Joannou issued by Cyprus Post

Some of the distinctions bestowed, in life and posthumously, on Stelios Joannou for his contributions to business and social causes include the following. He was awarded the Order of the Sultanate of Oman and the Gold Medal of Zeno of Citium (accepted on behalf of the Christos Stelios Ioannou Foundation). He was honoured by the Red Cross, the Church of Alexandria (for his contribution towards the rebuilding of the Patriarchate building), the Archdiocese of Thyateira and Great Britain, the Melathron Agoniston EOKA (House of Cypriot Freedom Fighters) and the Aspis Refugee Club-Association. He was awarded the Medal for Outstanding Service of the Republic of Cyprus (presented to Ellie Joannou (Ioannou) on 18 January 2001 by Glafcos Clerides). He received the Golden Key of the Municipality of Lefkara, while the City of Nicosia declared him an Honorary Citizen in 2003 and named the area between Delphi and Zannetou Streets in the parish of St Andreas as Stelios Joannou Square. He was also honoured by the American Hellenic Institute Foundation (AHIF), the Pancyprian Land and Building Developers Association (LBDA), the Cyprus Chamber of Commerce and Industry (KEBE) ‘for his valuable contribution to the development of Cyprus’ relations with Arab countries’, and the Technical Chamber of Cyprus (ETEK) ‘for his contribution to the promotion of engineering science and his overall social contribution’ (7 May 2011), as well as by various sports institutions and associations such as the Nicosia District National Football Federation (ΕΠΟΠΛ), the National Youth Union Mammari Rotsides Football Club and the Union of Cyprus Sports Writers. On 17 October 2016 Cyprus Post released a stamp with his image, included in the Great Cypriot Benefactors series.

== Bibliography ==
- Chrysanthos Chrysanthou (ed.), Μεγάλοι Κύπριοι. 150 Πρωτοπόροι. Πολιτική, Οικονομία και Επιχειρήσεις, Πολιτισμός, Τέχνες, Επιστήμες και Εκπαίδευση, Αθλητισμός, Κοινωνική Προσφορά, Vol. 1: Α-Κο, research and texts by Chrysanthos Chrysanthou and Anastasia Siakalli, Nicosia: Phileleftheros Group, 2015.
- Aristides L. Koudounaris, Βιογραφικόν Λεξικόν Κυπρίων 1800-1920, 6th revised edition, Nicosia 2010.
- Lions Care for Youth Foundation (ΛΙΑΑΠ): http://www2.cytanet.com.cy/laionikos-odigos/st/st-10-3.htm
- Averof Neophytou, ‘Η προσφορά του Στέλιου Ιωάννου στην οικονομία και την κοινωνία μας’, speech delivered at an event in honour of Stelios Joannou, Nicosia, 5 December 2016: http://www.averof.org.cy/index.php?id=1101
- Personal archives of Sylvia Ioannou and Dakis Joannou.
- ‘Stelios Ioannou / Στέλιος Ιωάννου’, The Hellenic Centre News, London, September 1999 – Issue No 8.
