= Tour Sans Fins =

Coordinates: 48.8944°N 2.2364°E

"Tower Without Ends"
- Tour Sans Fins
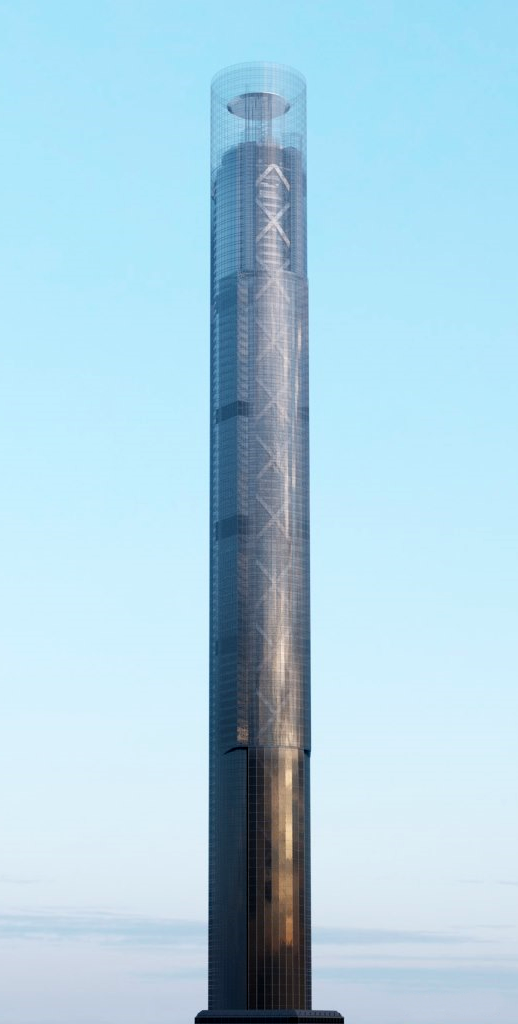
- 3D illustration of what the Tour sans fins could have looked like if it was actually built

General information
- Status: Vision
- Type: Office
- Location: Courbevoie (Hauts-de-Seine), France

Height
- Roof: 425.6 m (1,396 ft)

Technical details
- Floor count: 103

Design and construction
- Architect(s): Jean Nouvel

The Tour Sans Fins ("Endless Tower") is a canceled skyscraper located in La Défense. The spelling Tour Sans Fins may, to a native French-speaker, sound like a grammatical mistake as it would normally be written Tour Sans Fin without the 's' at the end of fins. However, the idea was that this tower had no ends, even if one looked up or down at it, hence "ends" and not "end".

== History ==
The history of the Tour Sans Fins is linked to the early projects for La Défense. The Grande Arche was built in an area that was not yet developed. As a testimony to the lack of completed construction in La Défense, the winning design was selected next to an outdoor parking lot of the RER The winner of this contest was Jean Nouvel, and his Tour Sans Fins was meant to be 425m tall and would have been the tallest skyscraper in Europe. Technical reasons in addition to the early 1990s recession resulted in the project was cancelled despite 20 million French francs was already spent.

== Design ==
The tower was meant to have a very original design. Having the shape of a cylinder, the base of the tower was to be very dark, becoming more clear as it approached the sky, thus giving the sensation of the tower disappearing. At its base the tower would have gone several levels down below the earth, like a crater, and would have ended with a tuned mass damper absorbing vibrations on its top. Elevators were to be located on the sides, allowing for panoramic views during ascent, and allowing the offices to occupy the centre.

To achieve the impression of the tower just disappearing into the sky, a wide range of material were to be used in its construction: unpolished black granite, anthracite granite, polished mica, polished aluminium, polished stainless-steel, reflective glass, tinted glass, silk-screened glass and finally clear glass. As Jean Nouvel said:

You don't quite know where the cylinder begins and ends because it rises from an excavation and dissipates into the sky.
