= Anna Theologou =

Cypriot economist and politician

Anna Theologou Άννα Θεολόγου

Member of the House of Representatives
- In office 2016–2021

Personal details
- Born: 12 March 1986 (age 40) Lemesos, Cyprus
- Party: Solidarity Movement(2016); Citizens' Alliance (2016–2018); Anex (2019–2024); AKEL (2024-present)
- Education: University of Cyprus; European University Cyprus

Anna Theologou (Greek: Άννα Θεολόγου; born 12 March 1986), is a Cypriot economist and politician who served as a member of the House of Representatives.

== Early life ==
Anna Theologou was born in Limassol. She studied Economics and did postgraduate studies in Monetary and Finance at University of Cyprus. She conducted postgraduate studies in Energy Resource Management at the European University of Cyprus.

== Career ==
She was elected to the parliament in the 2016 election, for Famagusta District as a member of the Citizens' Alliance Party. She is a member of the Parliamentary Committees on Energy, Commerce, Industry and Tourism, Transport, Communications and Works, Economic and Budgetary Affairs, Development and Control of Public Expenditure, Refugees, and the Ad Hoc Parliamentary Committee on the Revision and Modernization of Parliament's Rules of Procedure.

Theologou supported the nomination of Yiorgos Lillikas for the presidential elections in 2018. However, after the electoral failure of the candidacy, she left the Citizens Alliance and became independent in the House because she disagreed with the party's decision in view of the second round of the presidential elections, for "silencing the different view".

On October 30, 2019, she founded the centre-left political party "Independents", later renamed "Generation Change". In the 2021 legislative election, her party secured 2.82% of the votes, leaving her with no seat in the House of Representatives.

On January 27, 2024, it was officially announced that Anna Theologou will run in the 2024 European Elections as a candidate of the communist party AKEL, with her party Generation Change being deleted from the government registry.

== Personal life ==
Anna Theologou, was crowned "Miss Carlsberg" She is a Greek Orthodox practicant and speaks English, French and Italian.
