= Syndicat de l'Architecture =

Trade union of France

The Syndicat de l'Architecture is a French labor union for architects co-founded by Jean Nouvel.
