= Stelios Ioannou Learning Resource Center =

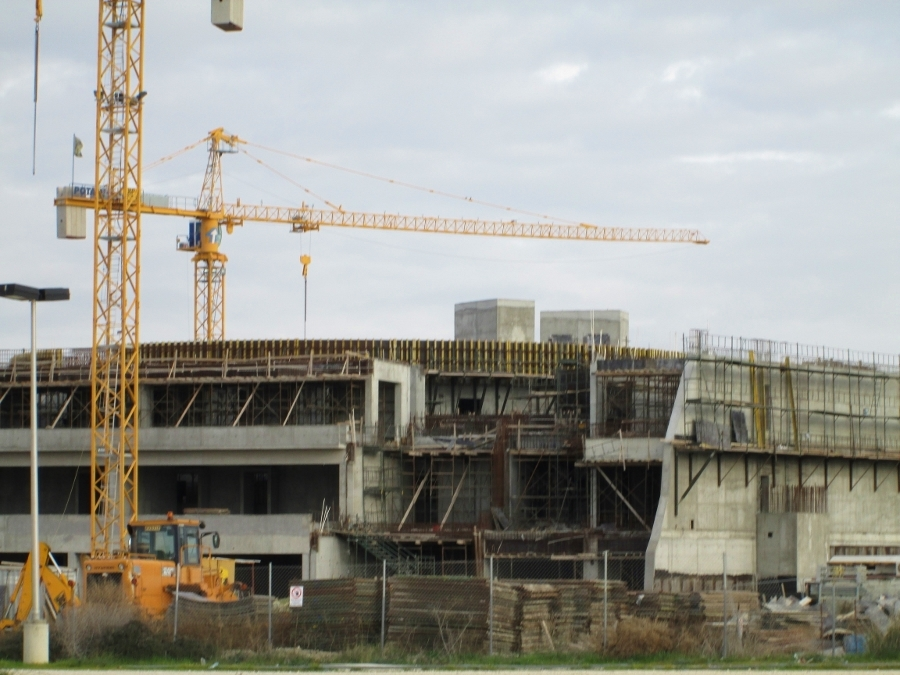
- 35.146950071277224°N 33.412740749639646°E
- Location: Nicosia, Cyprus
- Type: Academic library
- Architect: Jean Nouvel

Other information
- Affiliation: University of Cyprus
- Website: http://library.ucy.ac.cy/el

Stelios Ioannou Learning Resource Center (Greek: Βιβλιοθήκη – Κέντρο Πληροφόρησης «Στέλιος Ιωάννου») is the information center and library of the University of Cyprus in, Nicosia, Cyprus.

It is expected that this building will be an architectural reference point in Cyprus. The building will house 620.000 printed volumes, over 190.000 subscriptions to electronic book titles, approximately 12.000 subscriptions to electronic and printed journals and over 180 databases.

This modern multifunctional space, will integrate the Library, the core of Language Centre (LC), the center of technology for teaching and the Information Systems Services (ISS), under one roof. The building - as a single entity - ensures the integration and utilization of modern electronic and other media, particularly related to computing and information infrastructure, which are used by the library, Information Systems Services, the center of technology for teaching and the language Centre. This structure is the modern trend in the field of learning and support of information internationally. BUILDING DESCRIPTION LRC is located at the Northeast end of the campus and appears as a new geographical feature on the site. An artificial hill - similar in shape to the adjacent typical hills (particularly of the hill called ‘ARONAS’) in the area - wraps around the building. The building is as to say carved out of the hill, and open partially on the south and north side of the hill. A reinforced coated fabric membrane covers the entire surrounding slopes with a strip of vegetation at mid-height, enhancing the ambiguous aspect of this hill between natural and artificial. This fabric becomes a sun screen device when it covers the exposed facade of the building.

The building with a total area of 15.700 m² approximately, consists of 5 levels, basement ground floor and 3 floors. A basic cylinder with three wings around this basic cylinder formed the horizontal layout. Apart from the central void, there is another one between the cylinder and the three wings.

The Library is split in 5 superimposed rings around a central atrium/void has a cylindrical shape of 40m diameter. The reading rooms of the first 4 levels are open to the void, while the bookstacks are set on the outer ring. At the last level, the entire ring is occupied by a large reading room open to a terrace garden (plateau) on top of the hill at 14m high above natural ground is accessible to the users. It is an exterior extension of the main reading room located at the third (last) level.

Apart from the reading area around the inner void, 30 small study rooms (glass boxes) for group study are attached to the cylinder swinging in the external void.

The Library (the whole cylindrical shape) is covered by a dome/cupola with a heliostat (5m diameter) at the center of the dome. The heliostat will direct natural light into the building by reflecting it onto a large cone of 24m high, with a vertical axis and reflective surface set at the center of the void pointing towards the cupola reflects the daylight in the lower levels. The cupola is a luminous vault that should diffuse a controlled level of daylight for the best reading comfort of the main reading room, as well as direct a vertical and concentrated beam of light towards the cone. To ensure a good level of daylight in the lower levers, the creation of a vertical and concentrated beam of light in the direction of the cone at any hours of the day can be achieved with the positioning of an heliostat above the roof vertical to the cone. This heliostat is composed of operable louvers mounted on a rotating drum. The contrast of light level perceived from the interior is not desirable. Ideally, the variation between the strong light beam of the oculus and the diffuse lighting of the rest of the cupola should be the most continuous possible.

The 3 wings house the IT OPAC Labs, the teaching rooms, the administrative offices, utilities, mech rooms, stores etc.

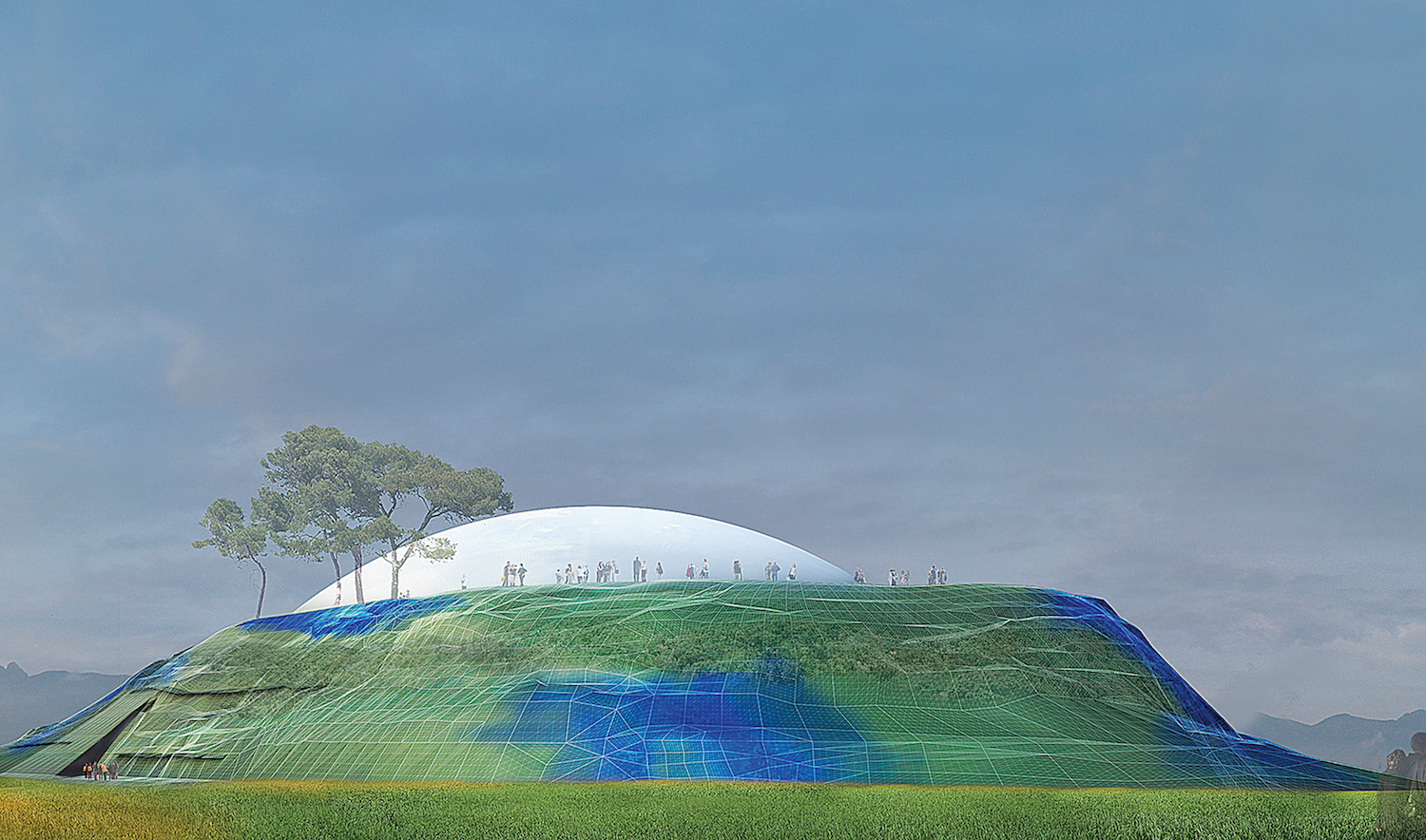
Representation of the library completed.

The project was designed by the famous French architect Jean Nouvel. It is named after the Greek Cypriots industrialist Stelios Ioannou.
