= Visionaire =

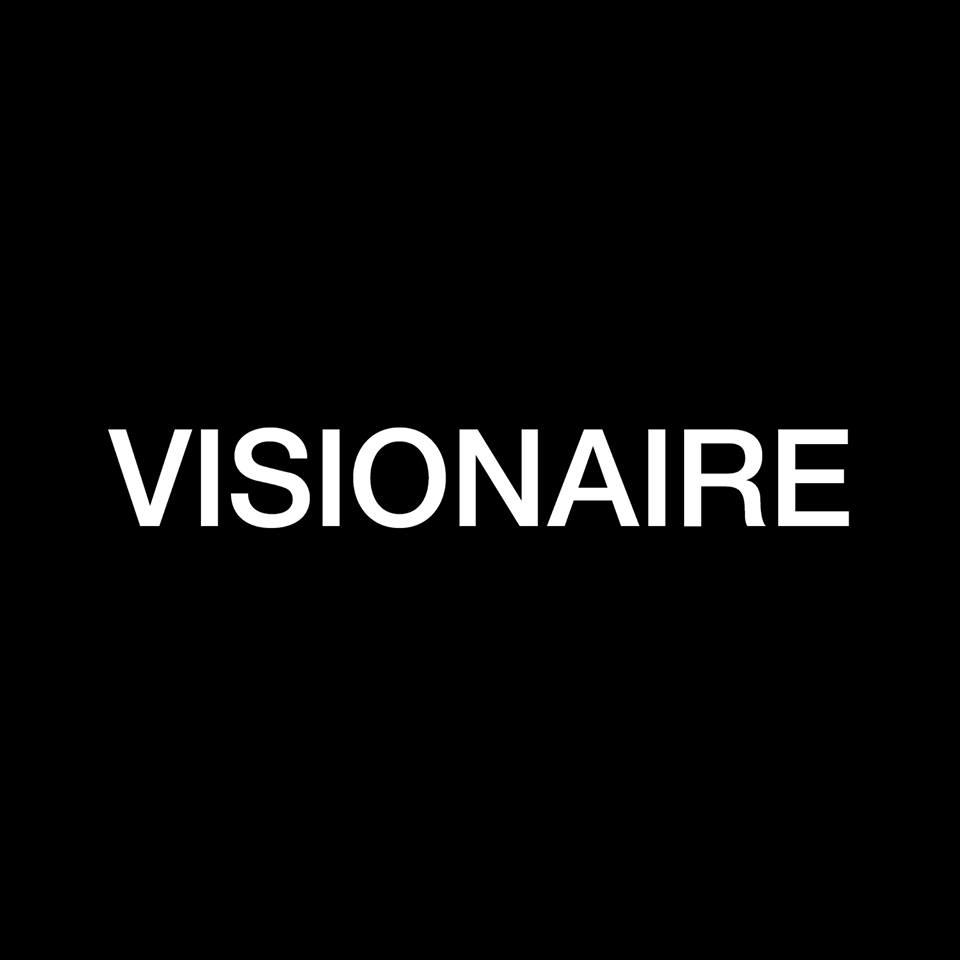
Visionaire Logo

Visionaire is a company based in New York City that creates films, experiences, and events in addition to an eponymous publication that intersect art, fashion, film, and contemporary culture across multiple platforms. Artists and designers often work in collaboration with Visionaire to produce interpretations on a theme.

Visionaire was founded in 1991 by Cecilia Dean, James Kaliardos, and Stephen Gan. Dean and Kaliardos continue to lead the company.

== Visionaire publication ==
Visionaire has published 67 editions since its inception in 1991. It is one of only two still remaining out of a 1994 Vanity Fair list of 10 "upstart" magazines to watch, alongside Surface. Fashion designers Rei Kawakubo (of Comme des Garçons), Tom Ford (for Gucci), Hedi Slimane (for Dior Homme), and Riccardo Tisci (for Givenchy) have guest-edited issues. Karl Lagerfeld, John Baldessari, and Steven Klein have been guest artists.

Other contributors have included Steven Meisel, Inez & Vinoodh, Mert and Marcus, Alexander McQueen, Raf Simons, Kate Moss, Barbara Kruger, Shirin Neshat, Yoko Ono, Bill Cunningham, Vik Muniz, Maurizio Cattelan, and Marina Abramović. Éditorial bureau includes as of 2021, Cécilia Dean and James Kaliardos, Arnaud Henry Salas-Perez as editor-at-large and revolving editor depending in the issue.

The issue's price often reflects its format. For example, edition 18 Fashion Special Louis Vuitton contained a Louis Vuitton pouch within its own leather and was reportedly sold at an auction for $5,000. The price can also be an indication as to the limited number in distribution; it often fluctuates based on available inventory.

In addition to the original Visionaire, the company launched three offshoot magazines: V (1999), VMan (2003), and with Carine Roitfeld, CR Fashion Book (2012).

In 2014, Dean, Kaliardos, and Gan divided their partnership. Dean and Kaliardos retained the company Visionaire, including the publication Visionaire, while Gan retained V and VMan.

== Installation ==
Visionaire has exhibited in New York, Miami, Tokyo, São Paulo, Moscow, Seoul, and Beijing.

They first curated shows for their former SoHo offices, including works by Inez & Vinoodh, Alex Katz, Vivienne Westwood and Malcolm McLaren, and Richard Phillips. The 2006 show “Megazines” displayed back issues of current and out-of-print independent publications.

In 2003, Visionaire premiered the three-dimensional film and sound installation 130919, A Portrait of Marina Abramović, directed by Matthew Placek, at Art Basel Miami Beach.

They began creating public art installations for Cadillac House in downtown Manhattan in 2016. An early show featured an automotive assembly-line robot reprogrammed to draw visitors’ portraits. Toiletpaper magazine, The Richard Avedon Foundation, and Daniel Arsham have also collaborated with Visionaire on these installations.

In 2017, Visionaire screened their virtual reality film KAWS: A VR Experience for free at the New York Public Library.

Visionaire has exhibited their own Visionaire publications at venues including Colette, Dover Street Market, and Frieze Art Fair.

== VisionaireFILM ==
Visionaire began producing short films in 2013, often with a focus on the creative processes of artists and fashion designers.

Films have featured Dior, Elie Saab, Valentino, and John Baldessari.

Their film 130919, A Portrait of Marina Abramović was an official selection of Sundance Film Festival, Toronto International Film Festival, Vancouver International Film Festival, Stockholm Film Festival, Festival du Nouveau Cinema, and Braunschweig International Film Festival.
