= Mia Hägg =

Swedish architect

Mia Hägg (born 1970 in Umeå, Sweden) is a Swedish architect and founder of the architecture practice Habiter Autrement, established in Paris in 2008 and now based in Locarno, Switzerland.

== Biography ==
Hägg studied architecture at Chalmers University of Technology in Gothenburg and at the École nationale supérieure d'architecture de Paris-Belleville. She subsequently joined Ateliers Jean Nouvel, where she worked as assistant project manager for the Dentsu Building in Tokyo.

She later joined Herzog & de Meuron in Basel, where she served as design project manager for several international projects, including the Beijing National Stadium for the 2008 Olympic Games.

In 2008, Hägg founded Habiter Autrement in Paris. Among the practice's early projects was a collaboration with Ateliers Jean Nouvel on three housing developments in the Bordeaux region: Lormont, Cenon and Armagnac. The projects reinterpret the conventional apartment block through individually configured dwellings, generous outdoor spaces and close relationships with the surrounding landscape.

The Lormont development received the 2012 Agora Architecture Prize for collective housing, while the Cenon and Armagnac developments received special mentions.

Hägg participated in the Venice Architecture Biennale in 2012. She returned to the Biennale in 2016.

Alongside her architectural practice, Hägg has taught at UCLouvain in Tournai and at the Accademia di Architettura di Mendrisio. She has also lectured at the Yale School of Architecture.

In 2022, she served on the jury for the European Union Prize for Contemporary Architecture – Mies van der Rohe Award.
