= Marla Hamburg Kennedy =

American art curator/dealer

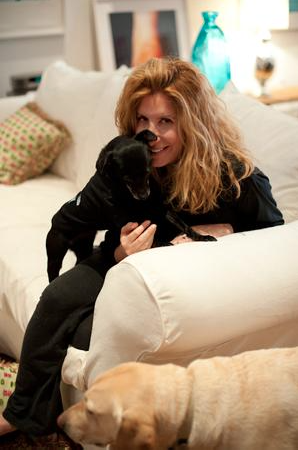
- Born: January 3, 1961 (age 65); Newark, New Jersey, U.S.
- Education: Barnard College, Columbia University
- Occupations: Photography curator, Art dealer

Marla Hamburg Kennedy is an American art curator, dealer and publisher specializing in contemporary art and photography. She is also an author and has published 30 photography and fine art books. She is the founder and owner of Hamburg Kennedy Photographs, HK Art Advisory, and Picture This Publications located in New York City.

== Early life ==
Kennedy was raised in West Orange, New Jersey, United States. She attended Barnard College (class of 1983), Columbia University, where she graduated in Art History and completed graduate studies in photographic history at New York University.

== Career ==
Founder of Hamburg Kennedy Photographs (HK Photographs), HK Art Advisory, Picture This Publications, and Peach Editions, Marla Hamburg Kennedy is a dealer, advisor and collector of 20th and 21st century photography, painting and sculpture. With 40 years experience in the fields of contemporary art, photography, publishing, and e-commerce fine art sales, Hamburg Kennedy has been involved in the contemporary art market: curating, advising, writing and investing in art and instrumental for decades in helping define bounds of contemporary art with classic photography and in creating the current photography market. She has authored and written about photography and art, curated historic exhibitions, and advised collections in both photography and contemporary Post War and 21st-century art.

After earning degrees in Art History from Columbia University and completing graduate studies in photographic history at New York University, Hamburg Kennedy was a writer and researcher for the American preservationist, historian, author, and television producer, Barbaralee Diamonstein-Spielvogel, as editor and writer of The Landmarks of New York, an Illustrated Record of the City's Historic Building, as well as writing articles and reviews for the New York Times.

Kennedy worked for Alanna Heiss, the founder and direct of PS1 (now known as MoMA PS1), helping to organize Arte Povera with curator Germano Celant in 1985. Her gallery career started as the New York Director of the Naples-based Galerie Lucio Amelio, working with artists such as Cy Twombly, Keith Haring, Joseph Beuys, and Andy Warhol. She also helped produce the exhibition Terrae Motus which Amelio organized in 1982 following the 1980 earthquake in Italy. ("Terrae Motus" is on permanent display in the Palace of Caserta.) She helped organize Andy Warhol's Vesuvius [Museo di Capodimonte 18 luglio-31 ottobre 1985] and oversaw the production of one of Warhol's last prints, Vesuvius, and acted as translator for the catalog accompanying the show.

In 1989 Hamburg Kennedy relocated to Los Angeles and became the Director of the Richard Green Gallery during the first influx of contemporary New York galleries opening in Los Angeles. In 1992 she was the Director of Angles Gallery specializing in both minimalist and conceptual work by contemporary international artists. Angles was one of the first galleries to showcase Hiroshi Sugimoto on the West coast.

In 1993 entered the field of classic photography as she directed the G. Ray Hawkins Gallery- where she organized dozens of contemporary art and photographic exhibitions around the world. She partnered with H20 Company based in Osaka and Tokyo organizing large scale photographic exhibitions that toured throughout Mitsubishi Stores in Japan for four years, and published accompanying catalogs and books for the exhibitions.

To bridge her love of 20th century fashion photography to the contemporary art world, she helped organize the International Festivals of Fashion in Tokyo (1997), writing the accompanying catalog.

Kennedy was a pioneer in developing e commerce for fine art, as the Senior Director of one of the first e commerce platforms in the world, Onview.com. She was one of the first to develop proprietary relationships with sites such as One Kings Lane, Gilt, and Real Real, Fab in selling photography online.

In 1999 Kennedy teamed with Marianne Boesky to open Kennedy Boesky Gallery to be one of the first contemporary art galleries to showcase side by side classic photography with contemporary art. Among some exhibitions include a Survey of 20th Century German Photography, Photographs by Yoshitomo Nara, 1970s Color Photography from the 1970s and the first gallery to exhibit the work of controversial of the German film director, actress, Leni Riefenstahl.

In 1996 Ms Kennedy founded Picture This Publications, to publish, edit, curate and partner on over 25 photography books (several with accompanying traveling exhibitions) including: The Kiss: Photographic Images (Greystone 1993); The Nude/Nobuyoshi Araki (H20 Company, 1993); Wedding Days (H20 1994); Little Angels (DAP, 1996); Little Devils (DAP 1996); I Do (DAP 1997); Car Culture (Gibbs Smith, 1997); International Festival of Fashion Photography I (H20 Japan, 1999); Fashion Photography II (H20, 2001); Twin Towers: An Elegy (Picture This Pub, 2002), Variety: Photographs by Nan Goldin (Rizzoli 2006); Havana Libre: Photographs by Michael Dweck (Damiani 2012), Nan Goldin Variety (Rizzoli).

Her book, Looking at Los Angeles ( Metropolis/DAP 2005), co-edited with Ben Stiller sold out its edition run and received accolades including being nominated as the #1 best art book on Amazon.com. New York: A Photographer's City (pub Rizzoli 2011) produced in partnership with the designer Richard Pandiscio captured images of post 9-11 New York City as documented by contemporary photographers. In 2014 she facilitated the production of the celebrated fashion photographer Ormond Gigli's first monograph, Ormond Gigli (Powerhouse 2014). In 2016 she edited and helped publish Jamel Shabazz. In 2014 Ms Kennedy worked with long time friend book Lenny Kravitz on Lenny Kravitz (September 2014 pub Rizzoli) for which she wrote the Afterward. She completed her second acclaimed book on Los Angeles with Both Sides of Sunset: Photographs of Los Angeles (Metropolis/DAP Spring 2015)with introduction by Ed Ruscha and accompanying exhibition. LIPSTICK FLAVOR: A Contemporary Art Story was co-edited with the curator Jérôme Sans (Damiani, Fall 2015) BROOKLYN NOW included photographs of contemporary Brooklyn published by Rizzoli and released to positive reviews in September 2018. Jamel Shabazz: Sights in the city, NStreet Photographs was released in 2017.

In 2014 she launched Peach Editions, an in-house print publishing company and e-commerce platform for affordable fine art prints. Other online projects include KIDS, a virtual exhibition of over 200 images of children by renown photographers for her non profit- Foster Care Counts in Los Angeles: an LA -based organization offering support for foster care kids and families nationwide. Kennedy also initiated the Art Collection for children at New York's Ronald McDonald House and has donated art annually to auctions to benefit philanthropic projects worldwide.

While Hamburg Kennedy holds a strong presence in New York City, she relocated to Los Angeles where she lives with her husband and 2 dogs and cat with a new gallery opening in Palm Springs, 2022. She has been an active member of Columbia University Alumni, and National Arts Club New York.

Kennedy is a lover of animals, donates to philanthropic organizations such as ASPCA and national and local shelters, and has been a foster mom and rescuer for dogs for over 35 years.

== Publications ==
Kennedy has published and authored over 30 photography books.

- The Kiss: Photographic Images (Greystone 1993)
- The Nude/Nobuyoshi Araki (H20 Company, 1993)
- Wedding Days (H20 1994); Little Angels (DAP, 1996)
- Little Devils (DAP 1996); I Do (DAP 1997)
- Car Culture (Gibbs Smith, 1997)
- International Festival of Fashion Photography I (H20 Japan, 1999)
- Fashion Photography II (H20, 2001)
- Twin Towers: An Elegy (Picture This Pub, 2002)
- Variety: Photographs by Nan Goldin (Rizzoli 2006)
- Havana Libre: Photographs by Michael Dweck (Damiani 2012)

Her book, Looking at Los Angeles (Metropolis/DAP 2005), co-edited with Ben Stiller was nominated as the best art book on Amazon.com. A more recent book, New York: A Photographer's City (Rizzoli 2011) produced in partnership with the designer Richard Pandiscio captured images of post 9-11 New York City as documented by contemporary photographers.

In 2014, Kennedy worked with fashion photographer Ormond Gigli to produce the monograph, Ormond Gigli (Powerhouse 2014). She helped produce the book Lenny Kravitz (Rizzoli 2014) for which she wrote the Afterword. In 2015 she released her second book on Los Angeles, with introduction by Edward Ruscha, Both Sides of Sunset: Photographs of Los Angeles (Metropolis/DAP Spring 2015) In the same 2014, she founded Peach Editions, an in-house print publishing company and e-commerce platform.

In 2016, Kennedy worked in collaboration with French curator Jérôme Sans to produce Lipstick Flavor: A Contemporary Art Story with Photography (2016, Damiani) In the same 2016 she edited and helped publish Jamel Shabazz.

In 2018, Kennedy completed and released her next book, BKLYN, images of Brooklyn though eyes of contemporary photographers and artists (Rizzoll 2018).

== Personal life ==
Kennedy has homes in upstate New York and New York City and shares profits from her business with animal rescue, cancer awareness and research. She has been an active member of the National Arts Club in New York City from 1996 to 2005. She is also an active Barnard and Columbia University alumna.
