= Cecilia Dean =

American model

- Born: Cecilia Dean; January 10, 1969 (age 57); Turlock, California, U.S.
- Modeling information
- Height: 5 ft 8 in (1.73 m)
- Hair color: Brown
- Eye color: Brown

Cecilia Dean is a former American fashion model and entrepreneur who was a co-founder of Visionaire, a multi-media art and fashion company.

== Early life ==
Born in Central California, Dean grew up in Davis, California. At age 12, her family moved to Long Island, New York. Dean's mother was an English professor and her father an Asian studies professor. Dean attended Sacred Heart Academy in Hempstead, New York.

In high school, Dean had interest in ballet, speech and debate, winning several trophies in switch-side varsity debate and oral interpretation in prose and poetry. She also competed in both state and national championships. Her aesthetic as a teenager veered a little Goth and glamorous.

== Modeling career ==
During high school, Dean and her friends were frequent visitors to Manhattan. On one such trip, she was scouted by a photographer who introduced her to Louise Despointes, owner of City Models. Despointes signed Dean as a model.

While a senior in high school, Dean began modeling for the American edition of Seventeen Magazine . Despointes arranged for Dean to do photos with fashion photographer Stephen Gan and makeup artist James Kaliardos. One of her first jobs was in 1986 with Mario Testino for the cover of a special teen edition of the Italian magazine, Lei. They went on to work on many more shoots together in Europe.

After graduating high school, Dean moved to Paris, France to pursue modeling, traveling in Europe and Japan. But after a year and a half, Dean returned to New York to attend Barnard College, majoring in English and French literature.

During her modeling career, Dean modeled for Richard Avedon, Irving Penn, Peter Lindbergh, Steven Meisel, Ellen Von Unwerth, Steven Klein, Mert and Marcus, and Inez and Vinoodh.

== Personal life ==
Dean lives in Red Hook, Brooklyn, with her partner, real estate and food entrepreneur David Selig.

== Visionaire ==
In 1991, Dean founded Visionaire, an art and fashion publication with Stephen Gan and James Kaliardos. Her agent, Louise Despointes, arranged to have Dean do photos with Gan and Kaliardos, one of her first test shoots—just to do a few photos for all of their books.

Artists who work in collaboration with Visionaire to produce interpretations on a theme are given freedom to push its content and original formats. Though artists aren't paid, many notable figures in art and fashion have worked on an issue with Visionaire.

Dean continues to run Visionaire with Kaliardos and has grown it from a publication to a company that curates luxury art fashion experiences.

== Museum shows ==
In 2010 Klaus Biesenbach, the director of MoMA PS1 in Queens, New York, approached Dean and then New York Times columnist David Colman about creating fashion exhibits for the museum.

The first project was called "MOVE!". With the self-imposed rule that the mannequins would be naked and no art would be hung on walls, Dean and Colman created a show that paired fashion designers with artists to create participatory experiences.

The next MoMA PS1 show was "POSE" by Ryan McNamara and Diane von Furstenberg. The participants changed into signature DVF wrap-dresses and were treated to quick hair and make-up. Once ready, performance artist McNamara would photograph the participants in precise fashion poses. These photos were immediately uploaded to a program that transformer the photos into textile patterns of the participants. The participants could then order DVF wrap-dresses with their patterns printed on the fabric: a one-of-a-kind DVF wrap-dress of oneself wearing a DVF wrap-dress.

The third exhibit was "LOOKS" by Rob Pruitt and Marc Jacobs. In this exhibit, the participant is instructed to walk down a long green hallway. As they do so, someone barks orders to "walk like a supermodel", "don't smile", "give attitude", etc. Upon exiting the hallway, the participant is faced with large projections of themselves superimposed into the Marc Jacobs fashion show.

In 2013 and 2014, Dean and Colman mounted MOVE! for 10 days in São Paulo, Brazil. In 2015, they mounted the show again in New York at Brookfield Place.

From 1995 to 2016, Dean taught "Publication Design: The Visual Story" at New School's Parsons School of Design.
