= Deste Foundation =

- Ίδρυμα ΔΕΣΤΕ
- Established: 1983
- Location: Fillelinon 11; 142 34 Nea Ionia, Greece
- Coordinates: 38.03990°N 23.7601°E
- Type: Art gallery
- Founder: Dakis Joannou
- Director: Dakis Ioannou
- Public transit access: Nea Ionia
- Website: www.deste.gr

Deste Foundation, Centre for Contemporary Art is an arts foundation in Nea Ionia, a northern suburb of Athens, Greece. Housing the art collection of Greek businessman Dakis Joannou, it organizes exhibitions with the collection and commissions new work by emerging and established international contemporary artists.

== Origin ==
The Deste Foundation was established in 1983 by Dakis Joannou, with the purpose of exploring the relationship between contemporary art and contemporary culture. Deste means "to see" (δέστε) in the Greek language. Between 1983 and 1996, when the foundation did not yet have a permanent exhibition space, the shows that took place in Athens were hosted at the House of Cyprus. In 1998 the Deste Foundation moved to its first permanent space, a former paper factory in Neo Psychiko redesigned by American architect Christian Hubert. Built as a sock factory in 1931, the foundation's current building was renovated by architect Christos Papoulias in 2006.

== Activities ==
At the Deste Foundation, overviews of the Dakis Collection have been presented by curators like Massimiliano Gioni and Jeffrey Deitch. Since the 1980s, every summer the foundation organizes a series of contemporary art exhibitions on the island of Hydra (island), with works on show there in a former slaughterhouse. In 2014, Pawel Althamer turned the exhibition space into a toy house, with puppets resembling his and his patron’s family members, down to hair styles and tattoos. The puppets of Joannou and his wife, Lietta, sat in a red mini armchair.

For the 2004 Summer Olympics in Athens, the foundation organized a show that featured the work of more than 60 artists from Joannou’s collection. He chartered a plane from Art Basel that year for collectors, curators, dealers and artists as part of the cultural program around the Olympics.

Beginning in 2009, the foundation has collaborated with the Athens-based Goulandris Museum of Cycladic Art, co-organizing an annual exhibition of works by artists shortlisted for the biannual Deste contemporary art prize. In 2010, the New Museum of Contemporary Art in New York showcased the foundation's collection in a three-story exhibition, with Jeff Koons as the guest curator. In 2014, the foundation launched a series of contemporary art shows under a new partnership with the Benaki Museum in Athens, known for its collection of ancient Greek and Roman art. Most exhibitions have publications to support the learning remit of the foundation.
