= Jean Nouvel =

French architect (born 1945)

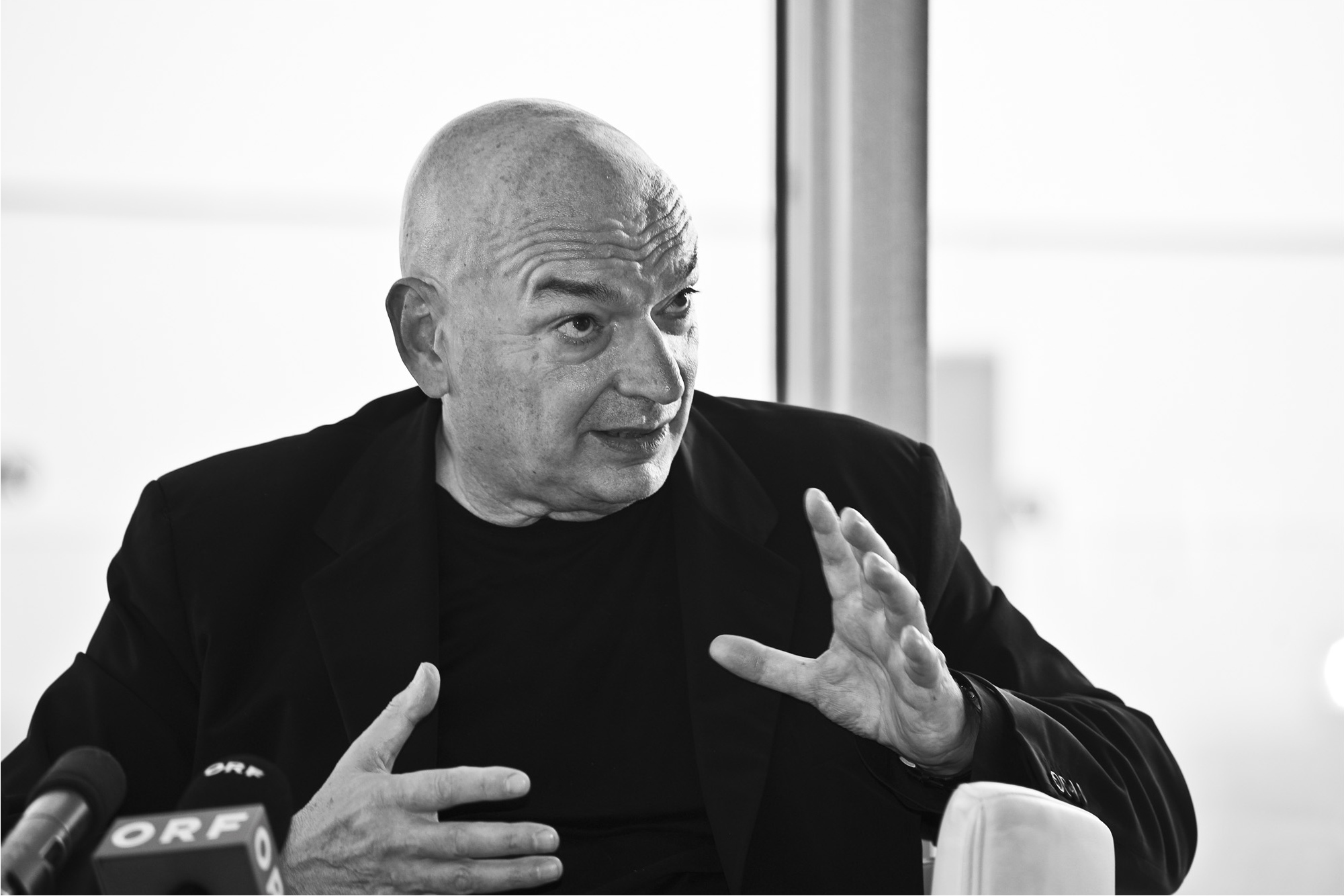
- Nouvel in 2009
- Born: 12 August 1945 (age 81); Fumel, Lot-et-Garonne, France
- Education: École nationale supérieure des Beaux-Arts
- Occupation: Architect
- Awards: Aga Khan Award for Architecture (Arab World Institute), Pritzker Prize, Wolf Prize in Arts, Praemium Imperiale
- Practice: Ateliers Jean Nouvel
- Buildings: Arab World Institute, Paris, Culture and Congress Centre, Lucerne, Guthrie Theater, Minneapolis, Torre Agbar, Barcelona, Musée du quai Branly, Paris, Fondation Cartier, Paris, Philharmonie, Paris; Louvre, Abu Dhabi

Jean Nouvel (French: [ʒɑ̃ nuvɛl]; born 12 August 1945) is a French architect. Nouvel studied at the École des Beaux-Arts in Paris and was a founding member of Mars 1976 and Syndicat de l'Architecture, France’s first labor union for architects. He has obtained a number of prestigious distinctions over the course of his career, including the Aga Khan Award for Architecture (for the Institut du Monde Arabe which Nouvel designed), the Wolf Prize in Arts in 2005 and the Pritzker Prize in 2008. A number of museums and architectural centres have presented retrospectives of his work.

== Family and education ==
Nouvel was born on 12 August 1945 in Fumel, France. He is the son of Renée and Roger Nouvel, who were teachers. When his father became the county's chief school superintendent, his family moved often. His parents encouraged Nouvel to study mathematics and language but when he was 16 years old he was captivated by art when a teacher taught him drawing. Although he later said he thought that his parents were guiding him to pursue a career in education or engineering, the family reached a compromise: he could study architecture, which they thought was less risky, as a profession, than art.

When Nouvel failed an entrance examination at the École des Beaux-Arts of Bordeaux, he moved to Paris, where he won first prize in a national competition to attend the École nationale supérieure des Beaux-Arts. From 1967 to 1970, he earned his income as an assistant to architects Claude Parent and Paul Virilio, who, after only one year, made him a project manager in charge of building a large apartment complex.

Nouvel and the filmmaker Odile Fillion have two sons: Bertrand, a post-doctorate computer scientist working at Mindstorm Multitouch in London, and Pierre, a theater producer and designer at his company, Factoid. With his second wife, Catherine Richard, Nouvel has a daughter, Sarah. In 2008, He was living with Mia Hägg, a Swedish architect whose practice, Habiter Autrement (HA), is based in Paris. His third wife, Lida Guan, is a Chinese architect who worked with Nouvel.

== Practice ==
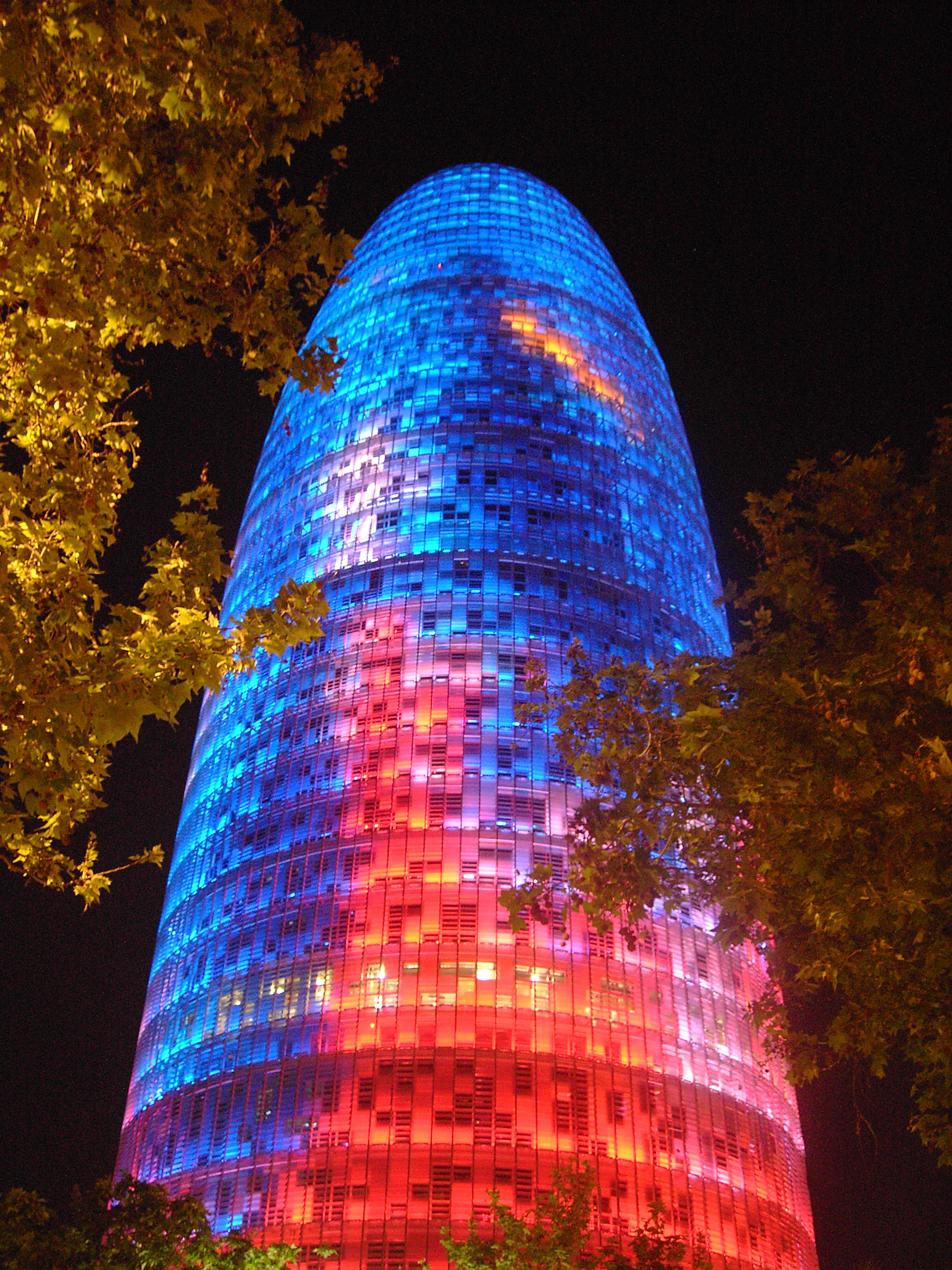
Torre Aigües de Barcelona (Agbar), Barcelona

By age 25, Nouvel completed school and entered into his own partnership with François Seigneur. Early in his career, Nouvel became a key participant in intellectual debates about architecture in France: in 1976, he co-founded the Mars 1976 movement, a backlash against corporatism in architecture, and, a year later, the Syndicat de l'Architecture. For 15 years, he designed exhibits for the Biennale de Paris, where he made contacts in the arts and theater. Nouvel was one of the organizers of the competition for the rejuvenation of the Les Halles district (1977) and, in 1980, founded the first Paris architecture biennale.

In 1981, Nouvel, together with Architecture-Studio, won the design competition for the Institut du Monde Arabe (Arab World Institute) building in Paris, whose construction was completed in 1987 and brought Nouvel international fame. Mechanical lenses reminiscent of Arabic latticework in its south wall open and shut automatically, controlling interior lighting as the lenses' photoelectric cells respond to exterior light levels.

Nouvel had three different partners between 1972 and 1984: Gilbert Lezenes, Jean-François Guyot, and Pierre Soria. In 1985, with his junior architects Emmanuel Blamont, Jean-Marc Ibos and Mirto Vitart, he founded Jean Nouvel et Associés. Then, with Emmanuel Gattani, he formed JNEC in 1988. In 1994, he founded Ateliers Jean Nouvel, his present practice, with Michel Pélissié. Today, it is one of the largest architectural practices in France. Its main office in Paris employs 140 people. In addition, Ateliers Jean Nouvel has site offices in Rome, Geneva, Madrid, and Barcelona. The company is working on 30 active projects in 13 countries.

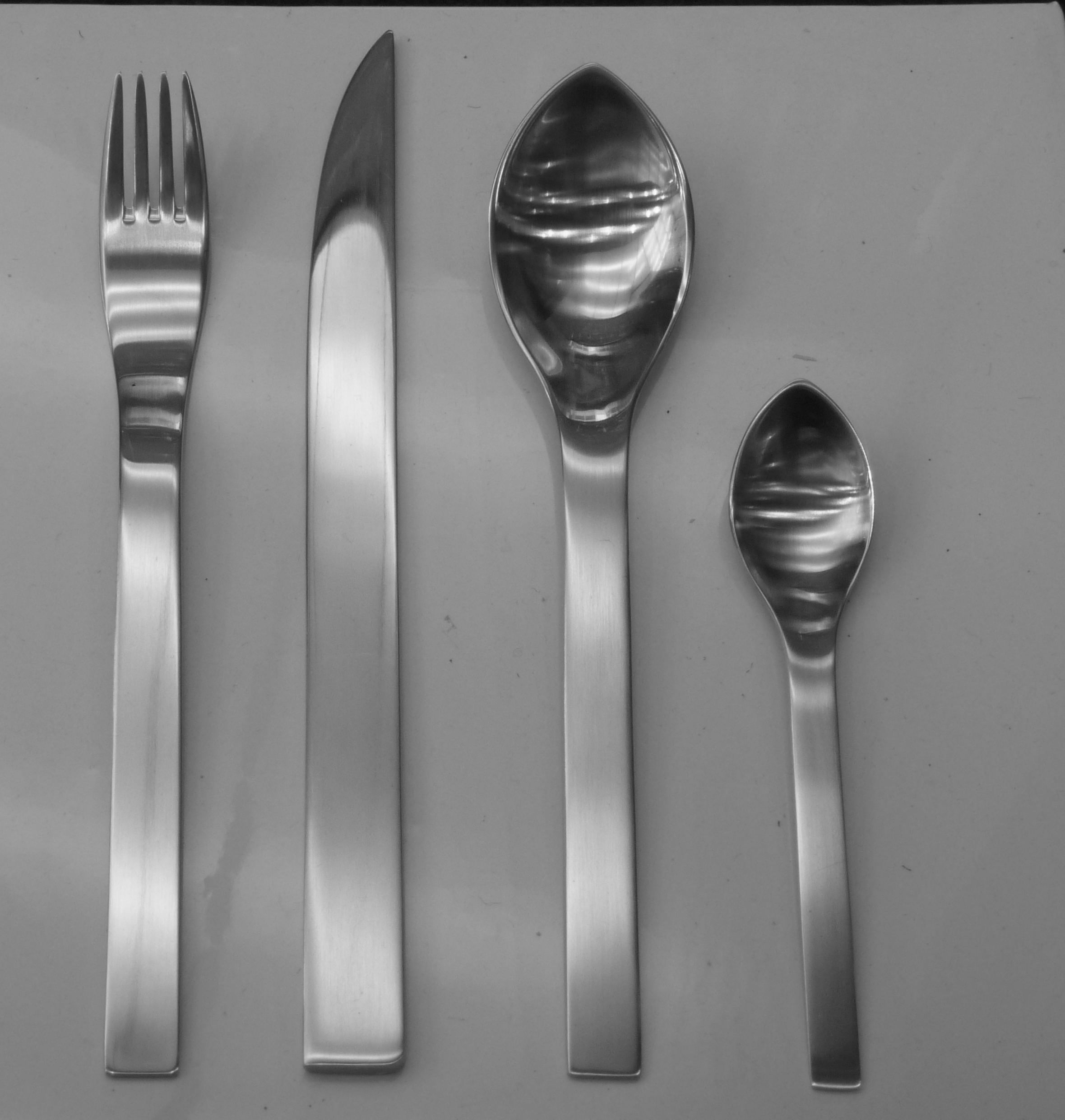
Steel Matte silverware for Georg Jensen (2005)

Nouvel has also designed products and furniture including cutlery for Georg Jensen in 2005, a flacon for a limited edition Yves Saint Laurent fragrance (L'Homme, 2008), and in 2012, the So So collection for American furniture manufacturer Emeco.

== Pritzker Prize ==
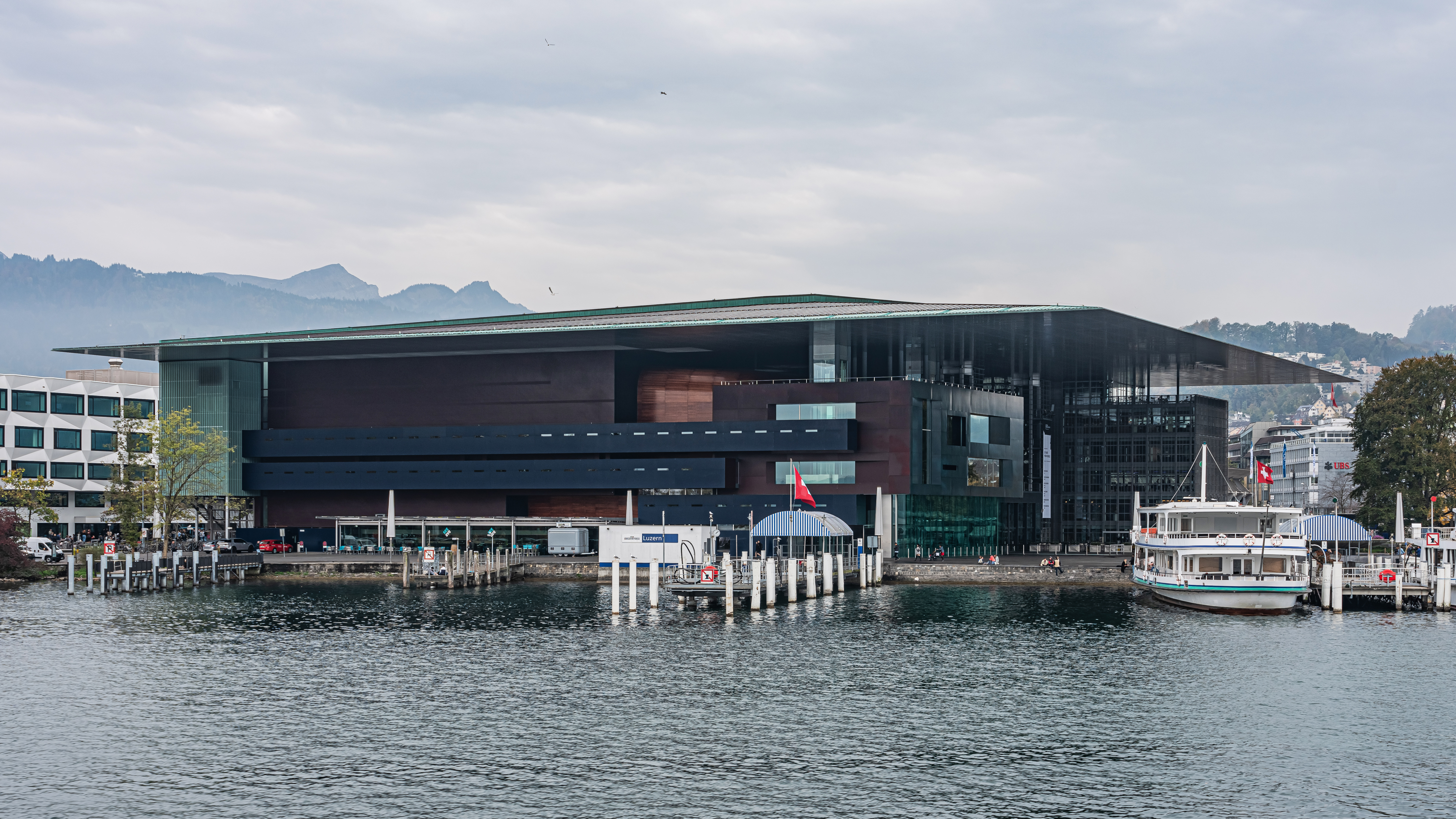
Culture and Convention Center (2000) in Lucerne

Nouvel was awarded the Pritzker Prize, architecture's highest honour, in 2008, for his work on more than 200 projects, among them, in the words of The New York Times, the "exotically louvered" Arab World Institute, the bullet-shaped and "candy-colored" Torre Agbar in Barcelona, the "muscular" Guthrie Theater with its cantilevered bridge in Minneapolis, and in Paris, the "defiant, mysterious, and wildly eccentric" Musée du quai Branly (2006) and the Philharmonie de Paris (a "trip into the unknown" c. 2012).

Pritzker points to several more major works: in Europe, the Cartier Foundation for Contemporary Art (1994), the Culture and Convention Center in Lucerne (2000), the Opéra Nouvel in Lyon (1993), Expo 2002 in Switzerland and, under construction, the Copenhagen Concert Hall and the courthouse in Nantes (2000); as well as two tall towers in planning in North America, Tour Verre in New York City and a cancelled condominium tower in Los Angeles.

In its citation, the jury of the Pritzker prize noted:

Of the many phrases that might be used to describe the career of architect Jean Nouvel, foremost are those that emphasize his courageous pursuit of new ideas and his challenge of accepted norms in order to stretch the boundaries of the field. [...] The jury acknowledged the 'persistence, imagination, exuberance, and, above all, an insatiable urge for creative experimentation' as qualities abundant in Nouvel's work.

== Architectural style ==
In its biographical sketch of Nouvel, the Pritzker site quotes Bill Lacy's One Hundred Contemporary Architects: "Since the beginning of his architectural career in the 1970s, [Nouvel] has broken the aesthetic of modernism and post-modernism to create a stylistic language all his own. He places enormous importance on designing a building harmonious with its surroundings."

"I am often presented as an architect of ‘French high tech,’" Nouvel said, in a talk he gave in Milan in April 1995. "I would like to begin by explaining what I mean by the term modernity: Modernity is alive, it is not some historical movement that was interrupted a few decades ago. Modernity is making the best use of our memory and moving ahead as fast as we can in terms of development."

Writing in The Architectural Review, Andrew Ayers quoted Nouvel's 1980 aperçu, "The future of architecture is no longer architectural," by which the architect meant that "rather than remaining a closed discipline, as it seemed to be in the technocratic France of the time, ‘architecture needed to seek its sources in the culture of today, in other disciplines’, and fully embrace the nature of the society of which it was the ultimate expression." Noting cinema's influence on Nouvel as well as the architect's affinity for postmodern philosophy, he added, "At its best, when [Nouvel] doesn’t overdo it, his is an approach that can enchant with its theatrical blurring of boundaries, its poetic feeling for atmosphere and its light-hearted play with signs and signifiers: the winking mechanical mashrabiyas of the Institut du Monde Arabe, the tree-filled mise en abyme of the crystalline Fondation Cartier, or the pluie de lumière that filters through the intricate metal-mesh dome of the Louvre Abu Dhabi."

"At his boldest, Nouvel is at the edge of what" the postmodern philosopher and media theorist Jean Baudrillard "called 'the sparkle and violence of American cities,'" wrote Amelia Stein, in The Guardian. "Both critics and admirers have commented that he eschews a formal language and, in a 2008 profile, the New York Times wrote that Nouvel’s work lacks even a 'readily apparent common sensibility.' 'They’re very right to say that,' Nouvel says, with quiet intensity, then a smile. 'I’m very proud of that. I’m not a painter or a writer; I don’t work in my room, I work in different cities with different people. I’m more akin to a movie-maker who makes movies on completely different subjects. To reduce style to the adoption of a formal language is such a short-sighted vision that if anybody is reproaching me for this, I would reproach their reproach.'”

== Projects ==
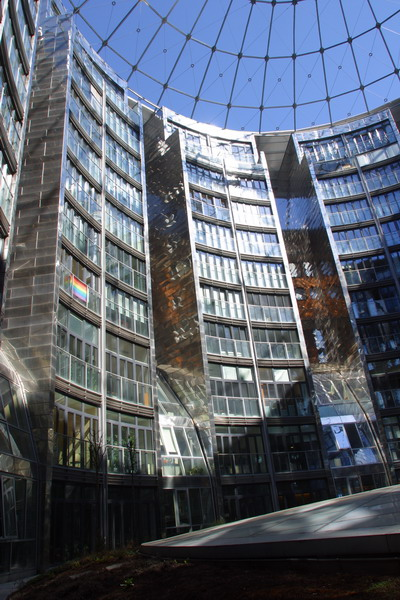
Gasometer A in Vienna (2001)

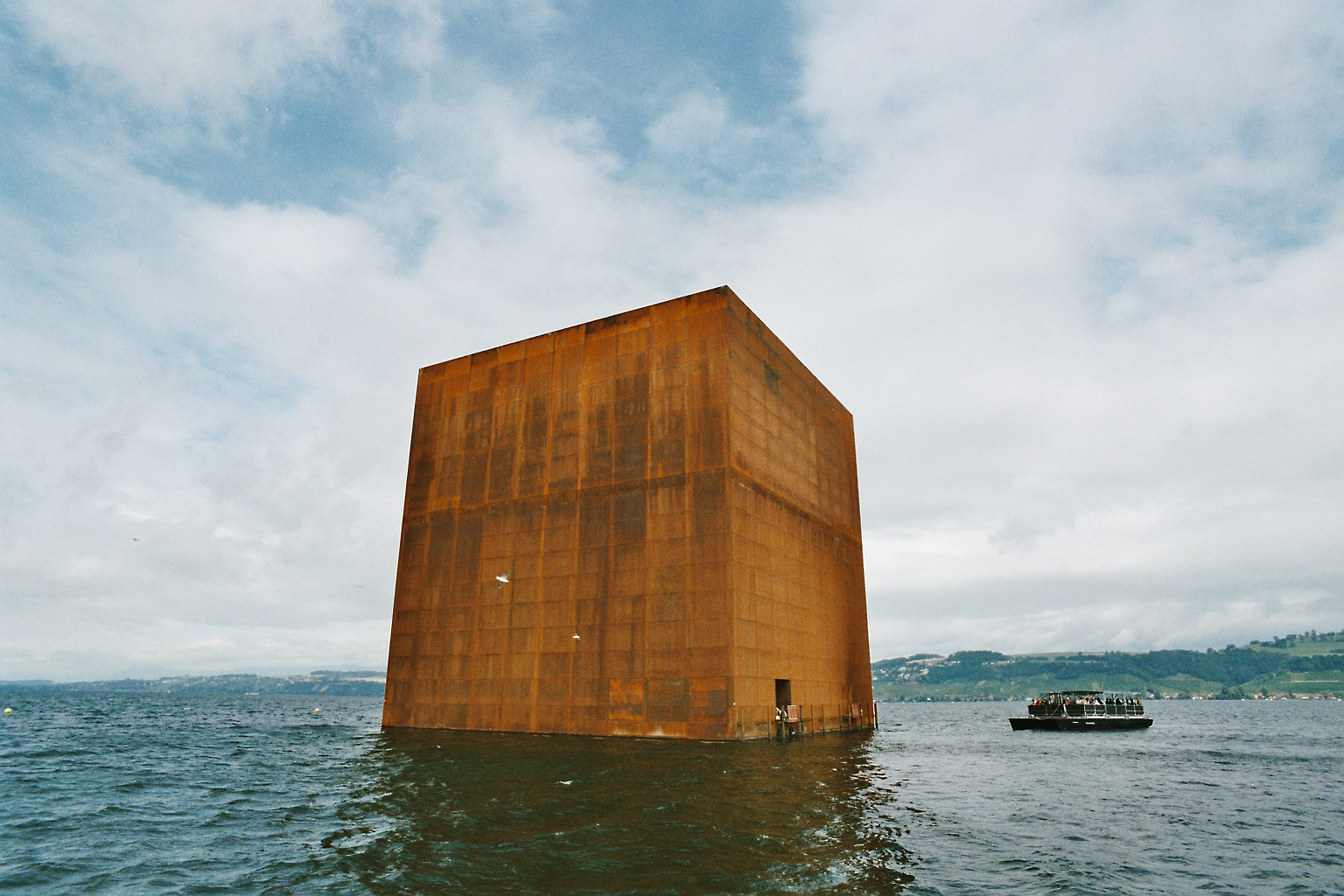
Monolith for Expo.02 in Switzerland (2002)

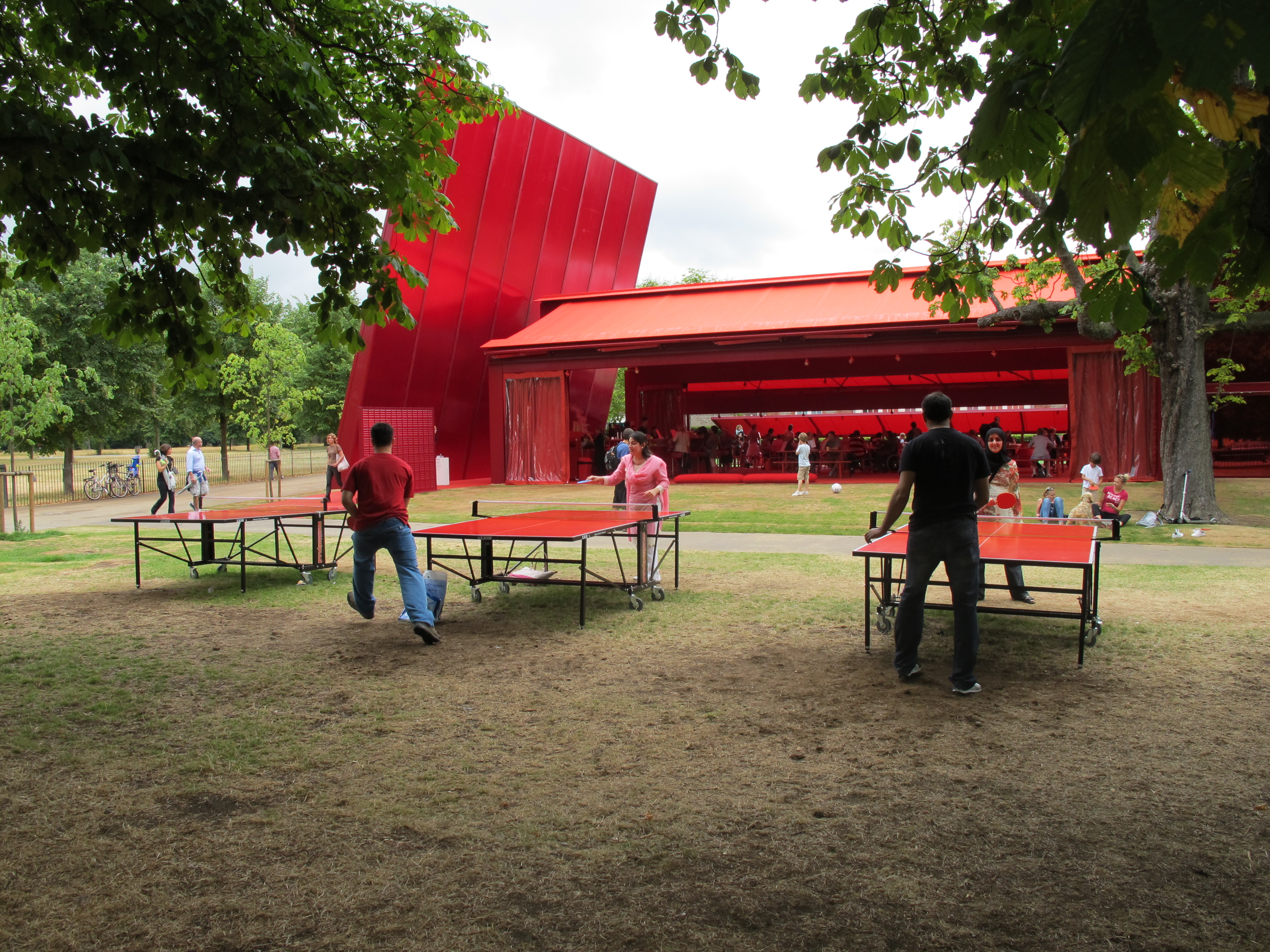
Serpentine Gallery Pavilion (2010)

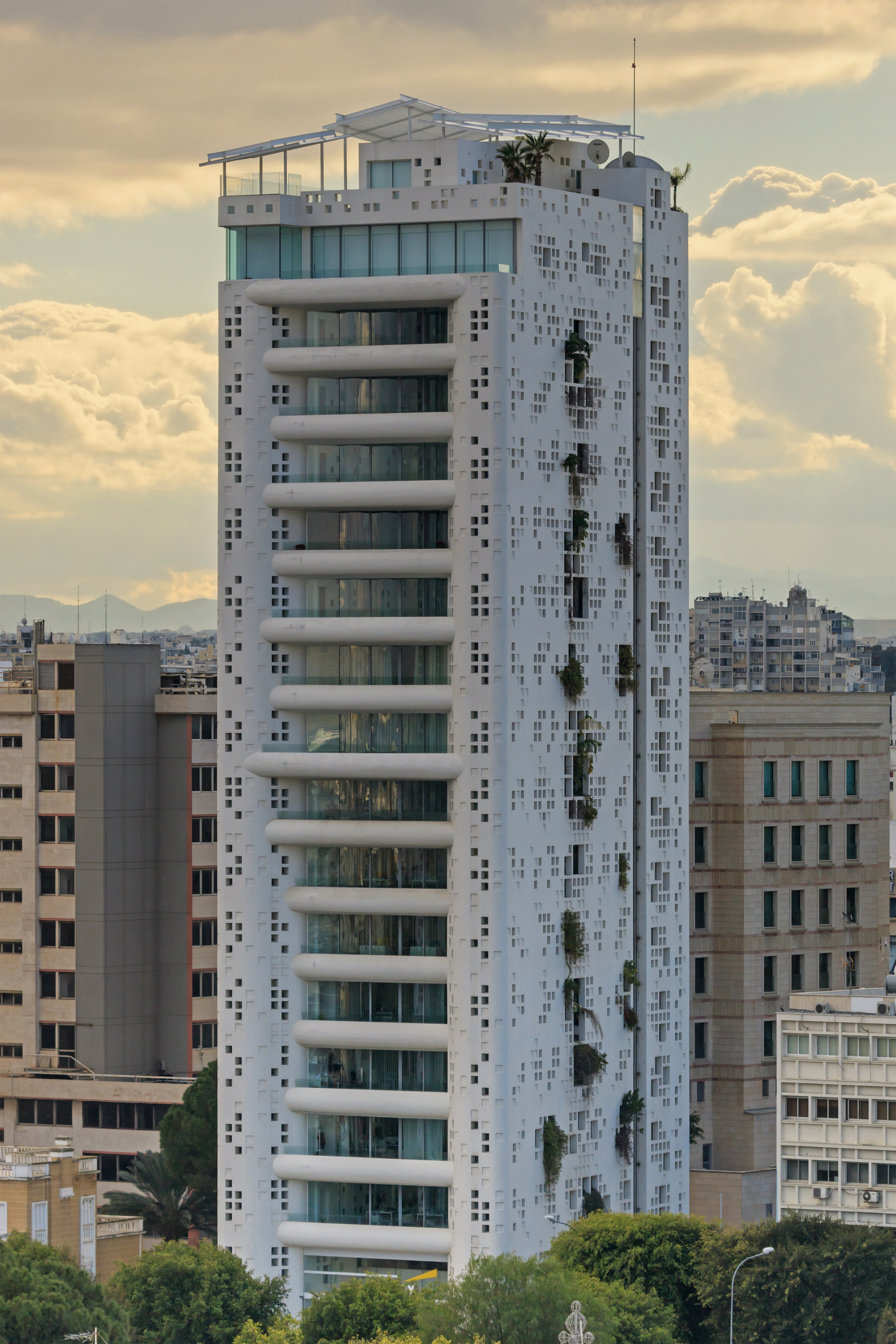
Tower 25, Nicosia, Cyprus (2011)

Nouvel has designed a number of notable buildings across the world, the most significant of which are listed below. As part of the announcement of Nouvel's Pritzker Prize, the Hyatt Foundation, which awards the prize, published a full illustrated list of Nouvel's architectural work, including projects which were never built, projects in construction, and designs for which construction has yet to start. In 2001, the director Beat Kuert filmed a documentary about five of Nouvel's projects, titled Jean Nouvel.

=== Notable works ===
- 1987 – Nemausus 1 (Housing, 114 apartments), Nîmes, France
- 1987 – Arab World Institute (together with Architecture-Studio), Paris, France
- 1994 – Fondation Cartier pour l'Art Contemporain (Office / Cultural), Paris, France
- 1995 – Euralille, (Retail / Office / Housing), Lille, France
- 2000 – Culture and Convention Center (Performance Space / Conference Hall / Museum / Restaurant), Lucerne, Switzerland
- 2000 – Palais de Justice, Nantes, France
- 2001 – Golden Angel (Zlatý Anděl), Prague, Czech Republic
- 2002 – Monolith of Expo.02, Murten, Switzerland
- 2004 – Torre Agbar (Office), Barcelona, Spain
- 2004 – Museum Two, Leeum, Samsung Museum of Art, Seoul, South Korea
- 2005 – Reina Sofía Museum expansion, Madrid, Spain
- 2006 – Musée du quai Branly, Paris, France
- 2006 – Guthrie Theater, Minneapolis, MN, USA
- 2009 – Copenhagen Concert Hall, Copenhagen, Denmark
- 2010 – 100 Eleventh Avenue, Manhattan, NY, USA.
- 2010 – Serpentine Gallery temporary pavilion, London
- 2010 – One New Change, London
- 2011 – Tower 25 in Nicosia
- 2012 – Doha Tower skyscraper, Doha, Qatar
- 2012 – City Hall, Montpellier.
- 2015 – Philharmonie de Paris, Paris
- 2015 – Tour Bleue, Charleroi
- 2016 – Le Nouvel Residences, Kuala Lumpur
- 2017 – Louvre Abu Dhabi, Abu Dhabi, United Arab Emirates
- 2018 – La Marseillaise, Marseille, France
- 2019 – National Museum of Qatar, Doha, Qatar
- 2019 – 53W53, Manhattan, NY, USA
- 2020 – Stelios Ioannou Learning Resource Center project for the University of Cyprus, Nicosia, Cyprus
- 2022 – Cidade Matarazzo Rosewood Hotel, São Paulo, Brazil

=== Under construction ===
- The Sharaan resort in the Kingdom of Saudi Arabia to be carved into a sandstone hill in the AlUla desert.
- The Central Park redevelopment plan in Sydney will see 11 new buildings in partnership with architects such as Norman Foster to recreate an abandoned brewery occupying almost four inner-city blocks. Nouvel's 120-meter One Central Park is his first project in Australia, and will feature a cantilevered mirror hanging over the central square off of the side of the building.

=== Proposed ===
- Nouvel is one of the architects involved in the designing of the new Slussen in Stockholm.
- In February 2008, Nouvel agreed to design a 45-story luxury condo tower in upscale Century City section of Los Angeles. The tower will be of modern design—it is designed to maximize views of the Los Angeles Country Club from the units and is opposed by both homeowners associations in Beverly Hills for the shadows it will cast on many small homes and its next door neighbor, Beverly Hills High School.

=== Abandoned projects ===
- 1989 – The Tour Sans Fins (Office/High-Rise) at La Défense, France, was never realized. Nouvel's winning design, proposed as Europe's tallest building in 1989, was to change ground up from granite, followed by aluminum, stainless steel and finally glass—"increasingly diaphanous before disappearing into the sky".
- 2003 – The Carnegie Science Center addition by Nouvel in Pittsburgh was never realized. Nouvel's winning design ended up being too expensive and Nouvel's contract was terminated by the Carnegie Science Center, citing a "dramatic difference between the budget for the project and the estimated cost."
- On Tuesday 27 May 2008 Nouvel's design won the contest for the upcoming Tour Signal in La Défense.

== Awards and honors ==
Nouvel and the buildings which he designed have received a number of distinctions during his career, the most prestigious of which are listed below.

=== Individual distinctions ===
- Honorary degrees from the University of Buenos Aires (1983), the Royal College of Art, London (2002) and the University of Naples (2002).
- Honorary fellow of the American Institute of Architects (1993) and of the Royal Institute of British Architects (1995).
- In 1997, Nouvel was named Commandeur de l'Ordre des Arts et des Lettres. He first joined the order in 1983. He is also Chevalier de la légion d'honneur.
- 2005 – Wolf Prize in Arts
- 2008 – Pritzker Prize

=== Distinctions for projects ===
- 1989 Aga Khan Award for Architecture for the Institut du Monde Arabe. In 1987, the building also won the Équerre d'Argent awarded yearly to the best building in France.
- 2010 Wallpaper* Magazine Design Award, Best new public house category for Copenhagen Concert Hall

=== Retrospectives ===
- 2001 – Centre Pompidou, Paris
- 2005 – Louisiana Museum of Modern Art
