= University of Cyprus =

Public university in Nicosia, Cyprus

Coordinates: 35°09′35″N 33°22′40″E

- Greek: Πανεπιστήμιο Κύπρου
- Type: Public
- Established: 1989; 37 years ago
- Affiliations: UNIMED; YERUN; EUA; UNICA; IAU
- Administrative staff: 811
- Undergraduates: 7.000
- Location: Nicosia, Cyprus
- Campus: Aglantzia
- Colors: Yellow
- Website: www.ucy.ac.cy

The University of Cyprus (UCY; Greek: Πανεπιστήμιο Κύπρου, ΠΚ) is a public research university established in Cyprus in 1989. It admitted its first students in 1992. It has approximately 7,000 students.

== History ==
The University of Cyprus was established in 1989 and admitted its first students in 1992. Nelly Tsougiopoulou-Saveriadou led the organization and the shaping of the structure of the University of Cyprus during its initial stages (1989–1995).

Admission for the majority of undergraduate students is by entrance examinations organised by the Ministry of Education and Culture of the Republic of Cyprus. A number of places are reserved for students with special needs or circumstances.

When the University of Cyprus opened, the incoming class consisted of 486 undergraduate students. During the academic year 2010–2011, 4691 undergraduate students attended courses offered by the 21 departments. At the same time, there were 1549 postgraduate students.

== Academic reputation ==
University rankings

Global – Overall
- ARWU World: 701–800 (2023)
- QS World: =452 (2026)
- THE World: 401–500 (2026)
- USNWR Global: =643 (2023)

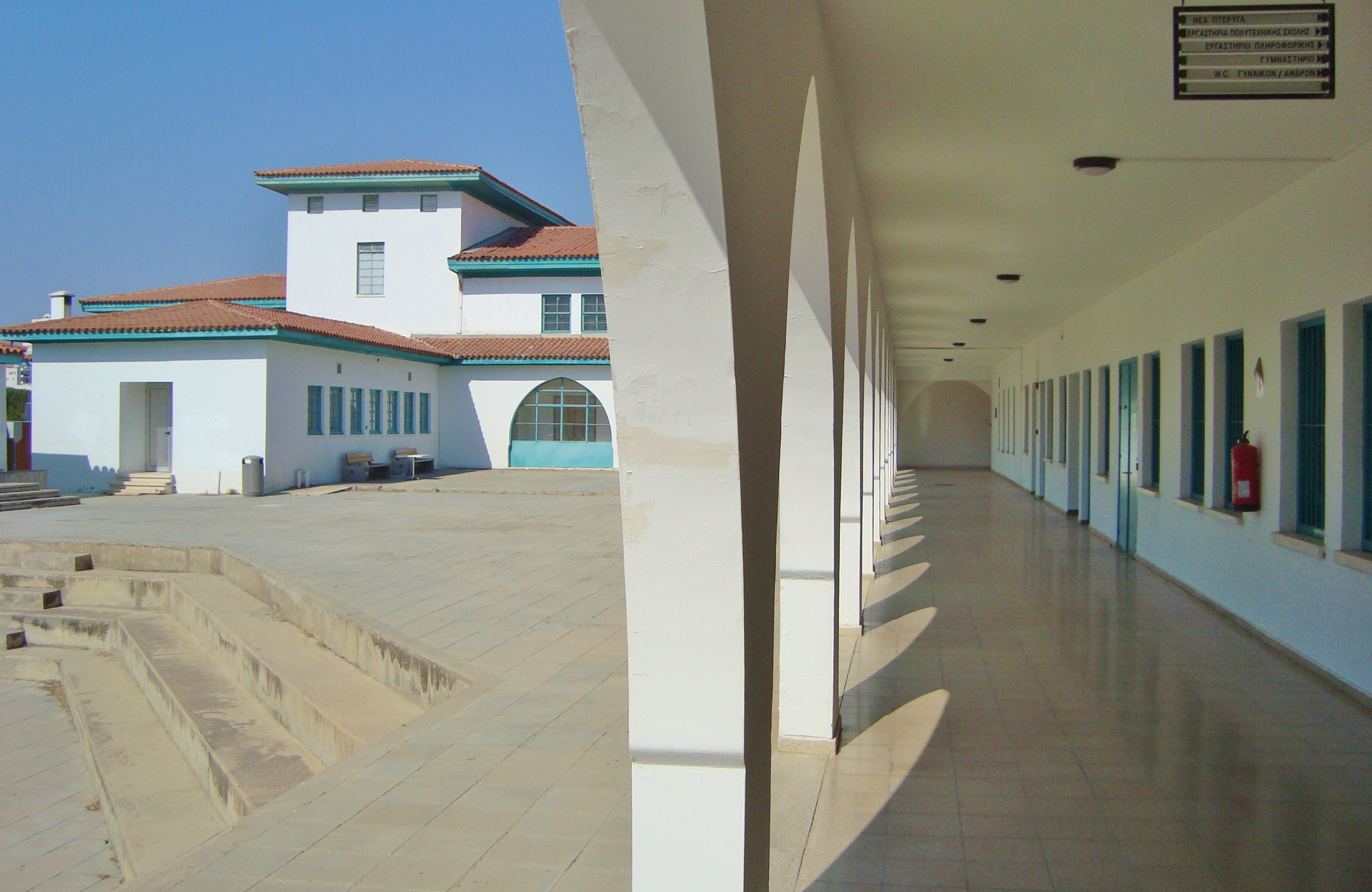
University of Cyprus in Nicosia capital of the Republic of Cyprus

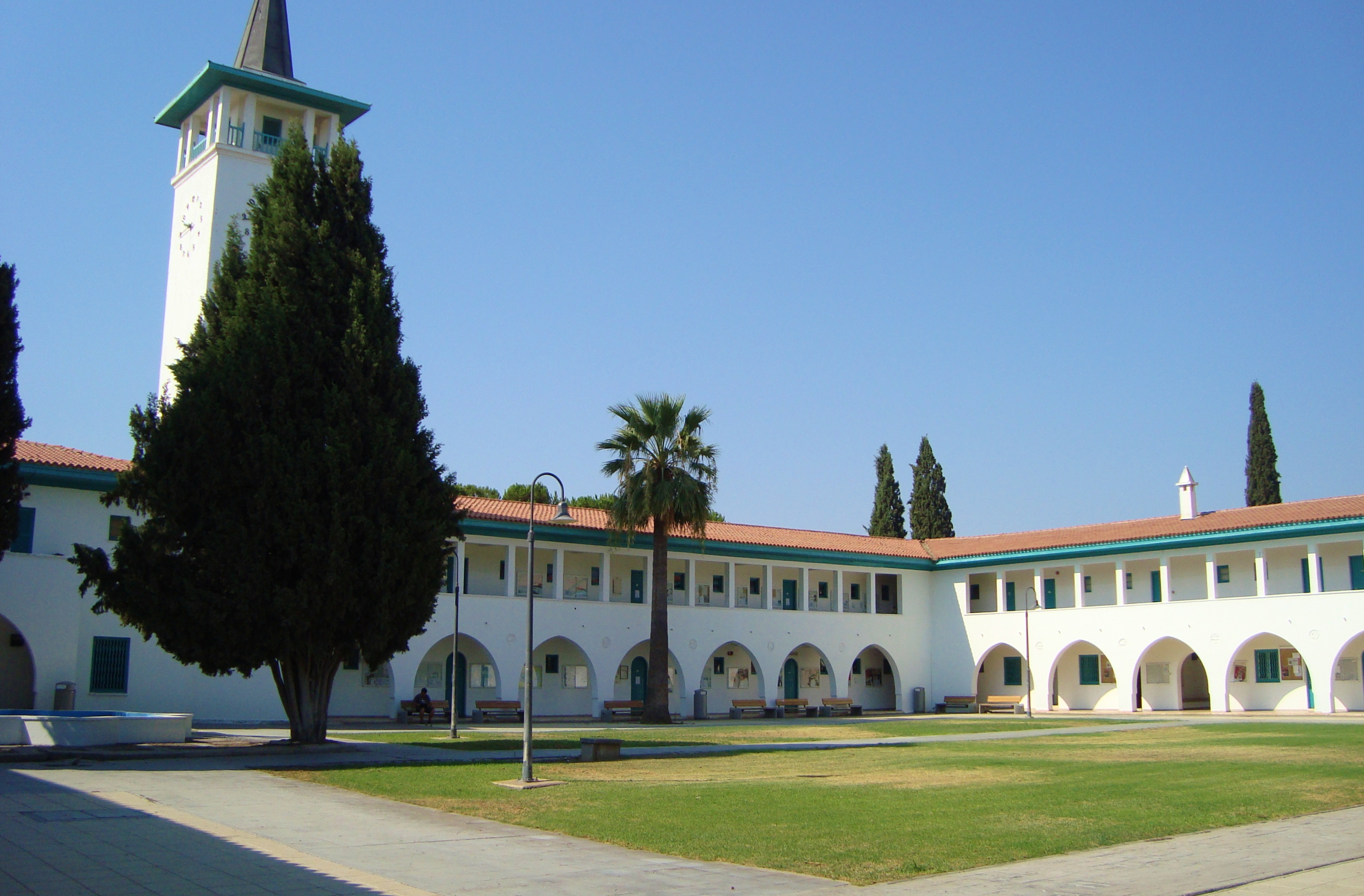
Main University square of the old campus

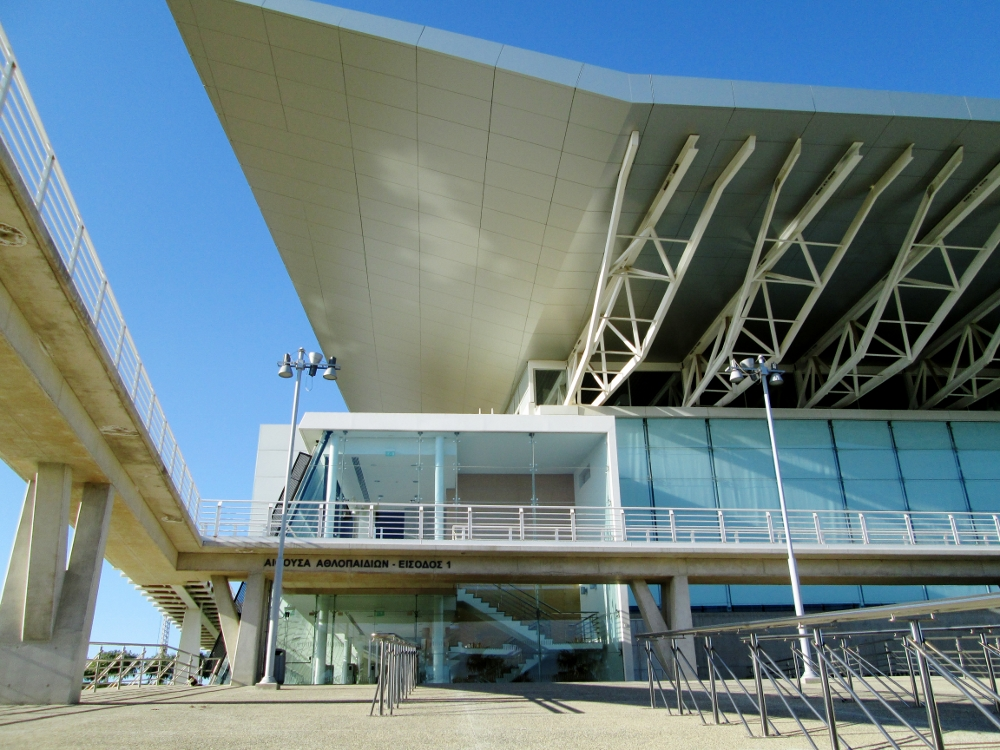
Athletics building

Based in the capital of Cyprus, Nicosia, teaching is mainly in Greek. The official languages are Greek and Turkish, but only a few Turkish speakers are registered. Since September 2005, the university credit point system is based on European Credit Transfer and Accumulation System.

Those eligible to participate in the entrance examination for the University of Cyprus are Cypriot citizens or those with at least one parent of Cypriot origin. Prospective students will have graduated from a six-year high school. A number of positions are granted to the handicapped or those with special needs.

Greeks of the Diaspora and Cypriots who belong to specific religious groups as determined by the constitution of Cyprus, repatriated Cypriots and Cypriots who are permanent residents in the other countries, can claim a limited number of posts (3% of the admitted Cypriot students) based on General Certificate of Secondary Education or General Certificate of Education or other equivalent exams. Turkish Cypriots who hold a six-year high-school diploma are eligible for admission upon passing special examinations set by the university.

The programmes of studies at the University of Cyprus are based on credit hours. One credit hour is normally equivalent to one weekly 50-minute «class» per semester. To graduate from the university, a student must successfully complete 120 credit hours as described in the programme of the department, which must include 12–15 credit hours of free elective courses outside the major area of studies and from at least two faculties. In addition to the 120 credit hours, the student must complete the university foreign language requirement of 6 to 9 credits.

According to the 2025 QS World University Rankings, the University of Cyprus ranks 389th in the world.

== Faculties ==
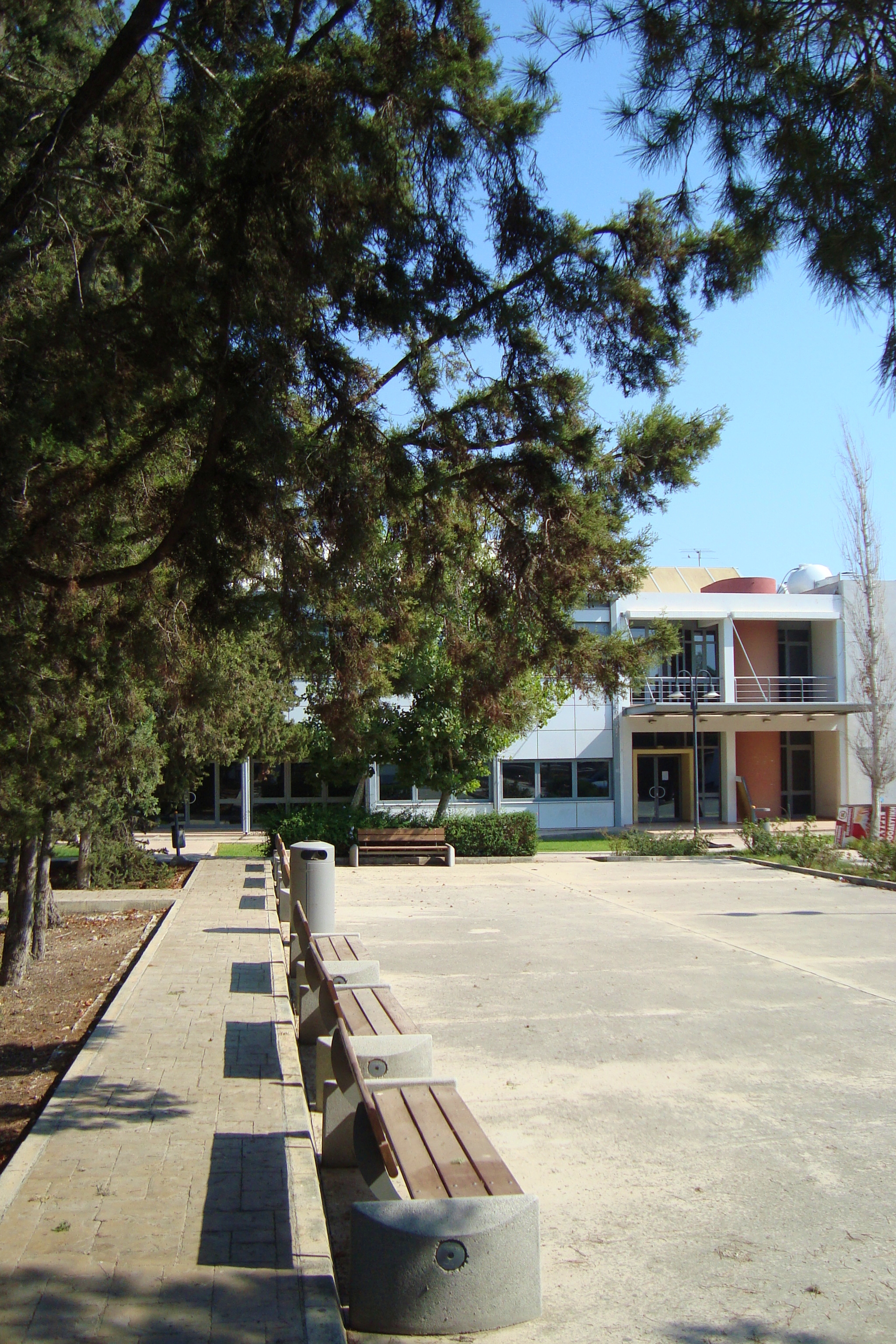
Mathematics department

There are eight faculties:

- Faculty of Humanities: three departments and the Language Centre
- Faculty of Pure and Applied Sciences: five departments and the Oceanography Centre
- Faculty of Social Sciences and Education: four departments and the Centre for Gender Studies
- Faculty of Economics and Management: two departments, the Economic Research Centre and the Centre for Banking and Financial Research
- Faculty of Engineering: four departments, the Nanotechnology Research Centre, the KIOS Research and Innovation Center of Excellence, the FOSS Research Centre for Sustainable Energy, the EMPHASIS Research Centre and Nireas International Water Research Centre
- Faculty of Letters: three departments and the Archaeological Research Unit
- Faculty of Graduate Studies
- The Medical School

== Library ==
The library offers access to more than 700,000 print and electronic book titles, tens of thousands of online and print journal titles, and 160 scientific databases. It also includes audiovisual and digitized material.

The Stelios Ioannou Learning Resource Center was designed by the French architect Jean Nouvel in 2017.

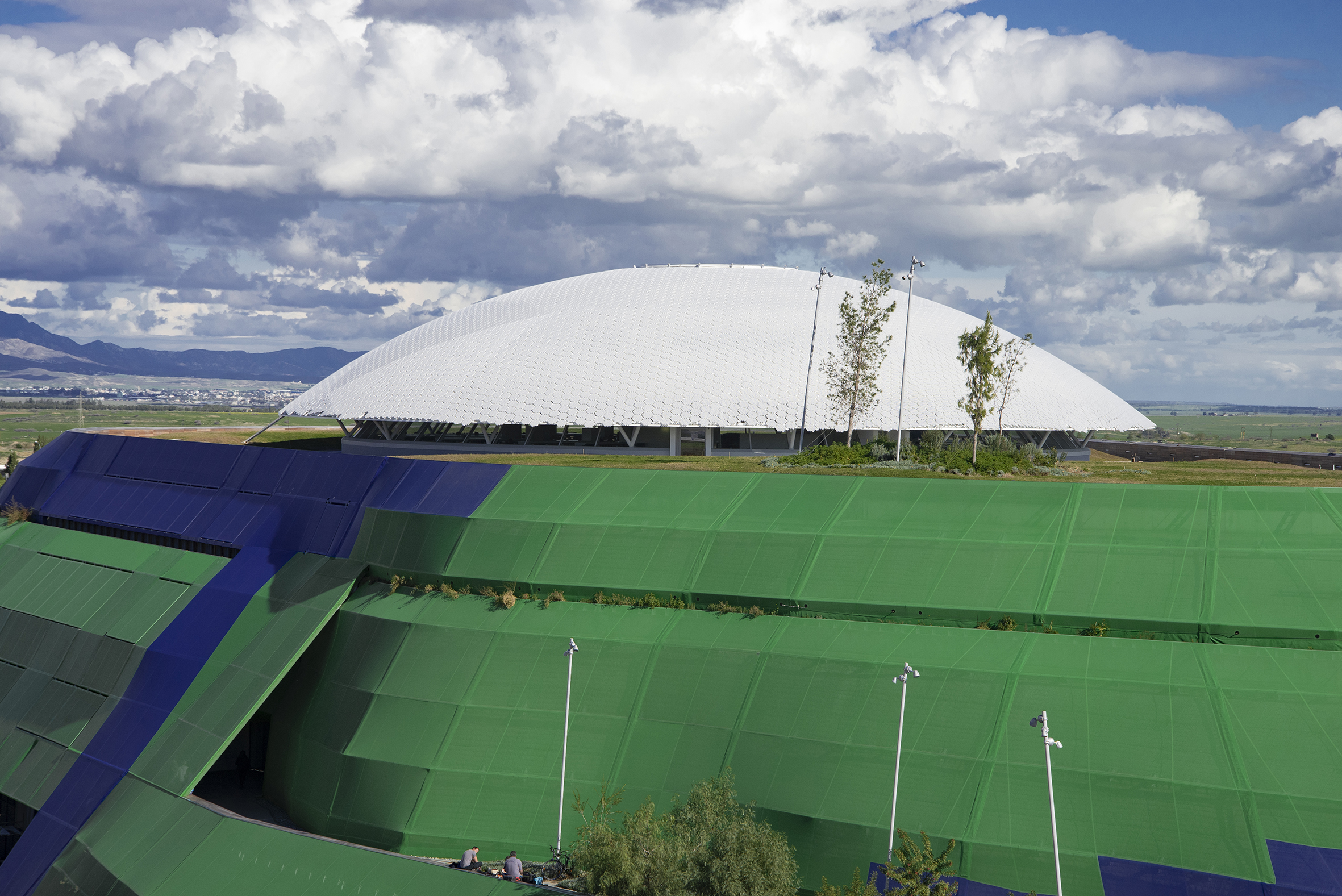
Stelios Ioannou Learning Resource Center

Following the valuable contribution of the late Ellie Ioannou who donated €8m in memory of her husband Stelios Ioannou, as well as the co-funding by the European Regional Development Fund as part of the Operational Programme "Competitiveness and Sustainable Development", the University of Cyprus has completed the contemporary building of the Learning Resource Centre "Stelios Ioannou".

The building is located in the northeast of the university campus on an artificial hill similar in shape to the adjacent hills of the area, especially resembling the Aronas hill which dominates the southern part of the area with its characteristic plateau.

A coloured membrane covers all sides of the artificial hill's slopes and an impressive white cupola juts out of the plateau crowning it.

The building has a total surface area of approximately 15,700 sq.m. and rises vertically, sprawling to five levels (basement, ground floor and three more floors above ground level).

Horizontally, the building is formed around a central cylinder with three peripheral wings. Apart from the patio inside the cylinder, a peripheral second patio is located between the central cylinder and the three wings.

The 40m central cylinder that hosts the Library extends to five successive concentric rings around the central patio.

Reading rooms at all levels, except the 3rd floor, occupy the inner zone of the rings towards the central patio, with book stacks in the outer zone.

The 3rd floor hosts a large reading room that expands visually to the hill plateau that is located 14m from the ground.

Additionally, 31 further small glass-divided spaces for group study are adjacent to the outer periphery of the cylinder and are ‘suspended’ in the peripheral patio.

The library roof is covered by a translucent cupola on top of which appears a 5m heliostat with a vertical rotation axis of integrated rotating blinds that direct natural light even to the lowest building level. Natural light is diffused to all reading rooms in the lower levels through a system that reflects light on the surface of a 24m cone located at the centre of the central patio.

The three wings on the periphery of the central cylinder host two amphitheaters, computer labs, teaching spaces, multimedia labs and personnel offices, as well as the building's functional support spaces.

== Research ==
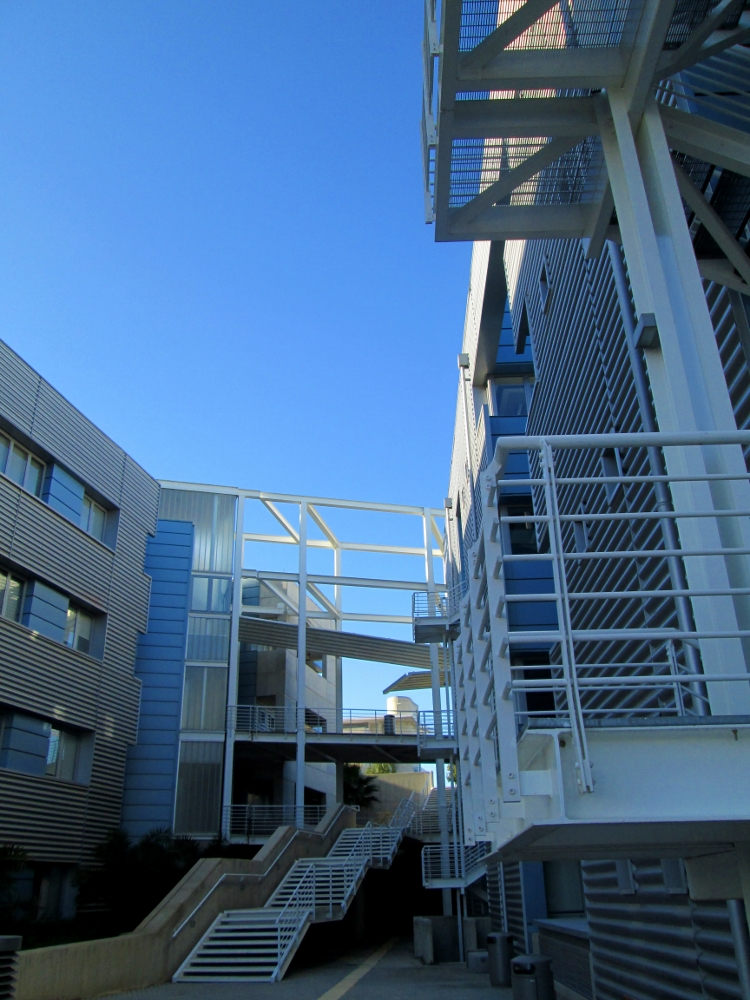
Faculty of Economics.

There are currently more than 200 ongoing research programs, in collaboration with other academic, private and governmental authorities. A list of the current research programs can be found here. Additionally, more than 550 programs were completed in the period from 2012–2019. The list of the completed programs can be seen here.

Notable research activities include the following:

- The university announced in 2012 a 10 MW photovoltaic park.
- The university will lead a €1.3 million investigation into the adoption of net metering.
- UoC will lead an EU-funded European research module on compelling net metering policies.
- Institutions from five countries will join UoC on a project: Aristotle University, Greece; University of Maribor, Slovenia; Andalusian Energy Institute, Spain; Agency for Energy and Environment in Rhone Alpes, France; and the Agency for Energy and Environment in Algarve, Portugal.
- Professor Triantafyllos Stylianopoulos from the Faculty of Engineering received the UNESCO-Equatorial Guinea International Prize for Research in the Life Sciences for his significant research efforts.

== Notable alumni ==
- Anna Theologou, Greek Cypriot economist and politician.
- Annita Demetriou, President of the Cypriot House of Representatives.
- Demetrios Nicolaides, Canadian politician.
- Doğuş Derya, Turkish Cypriot activist and politician.
- Maria Elena Kyriakou, Greek Cypriot singer.
- Neşe Yaşın, Turkish Cypriot poet and author.

== See also ==
- List of universities and colleges in Cyprus
