= Death of Marilyn Monroe =

1962 death of Marilyn Monroe by overdose

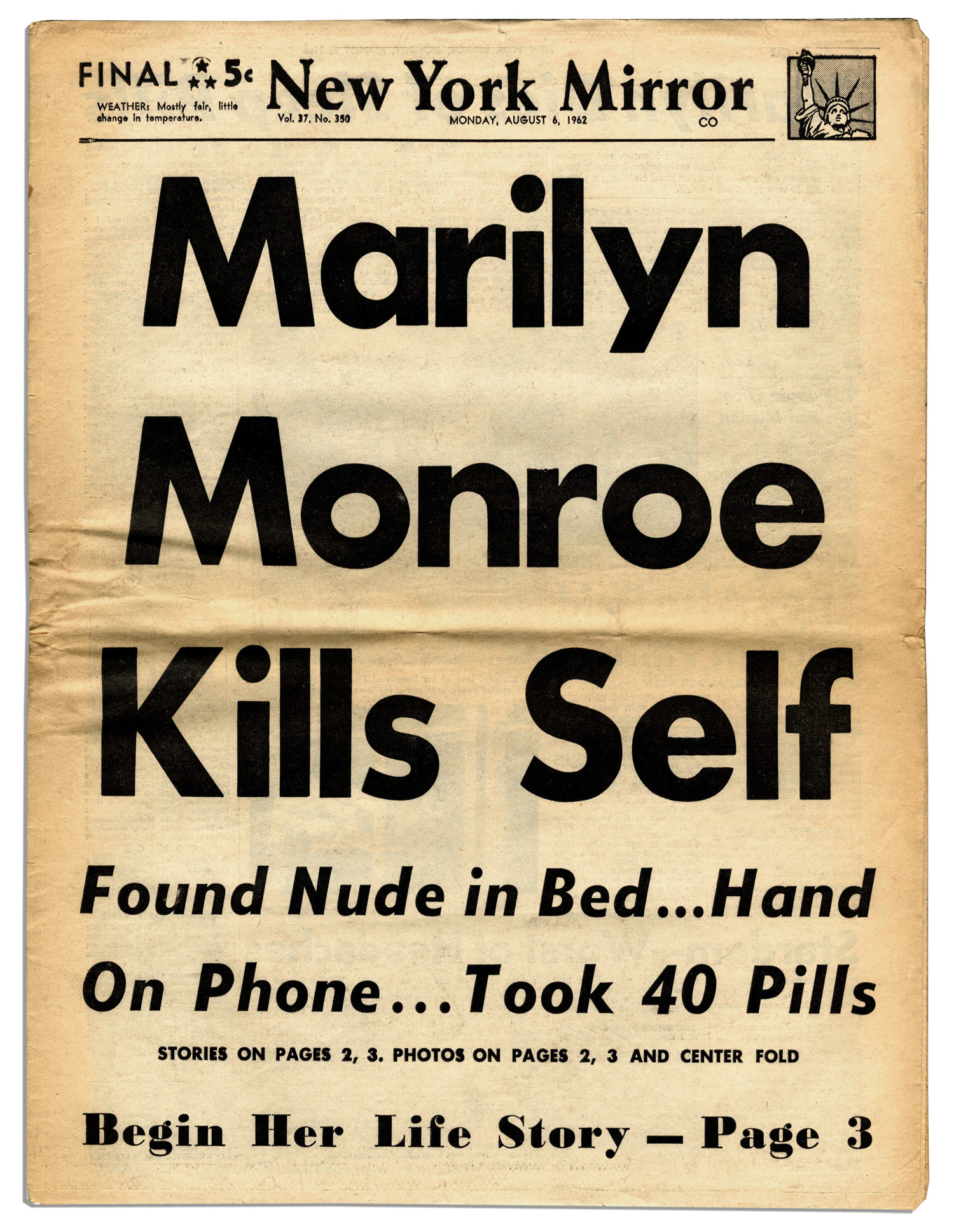
- New York Daily Mirror front page article, August 6, 1962
- Date: August 4, 1962; 64 years ago
- Time: Late evening
- Location: 12305 Fifth Helena Drive, Brentwood, Los Angeles, California, U.S.
- Cause: Barbiturate overdose/overdosage on antidepressants
- Burial: August 8, 1962, at the Westwood Village Memorial Park Cemetery, Los Angeles, California, U.S.
- Inquest: August 17, 1962, Los Angeles
- Coroner: Theodore Curphey
- Charges: None
- Verdict: Probable suicide

On the evening of August 4, 1962, American actress Marilyn Monroe died at age 36 of a barbiturate overdose inside her home at 12305 Fifth Helena Drive in Brentwood, Los Angeles, California. Her body was discovered before dawn the following morning, on August 5. Monroe had been one of the most popular Hollywood stars during the 1950s and early 1960s and was a top-billed actress for the preceding decade. Her films had grossed $200 million by the time of her death ($2.1 billion today).

Monroe had suffered from mental illness and substance abuse, and she had not completed a film since The Misfits, released on February 1, 1961, which was a box-office disappointment. Monroe had spent 1961 preoccupied with her various health problems, and in April 1962 had begun filming Something's Got to Give for 20th Century Fox, but the studio fired her in early June. Fox publicly blamed Monroe for the production's problems, and in the weeks preceding her death she had attempted to repair her public image by giving several interviews to high-profile publications. She also began negotiations with Fox on being re-hired for Something's Got to Give and for starring roles in other productions.

Monroe spent the day of her death, August 4, at her home in Brentwood. She was accompanied at various times by publicist Patricia Newcomb, housekeeper Eunice Murray, photographer Lawrence Schiller, and psychiatrist Ralph Greenson. At Greenson's request, Murray stayed overnight to keep Monroe company. At approximately 3 a.m. on Sunday, August 5, Murray noticed that Monroe had locked herself in her bedroom and appeared unresponsive when she looked inside through a window. Murray alerted Greenson, who arrived soon after, entered the room by breaking a window, and found Monroe dead. Her death was officially ruled a probable suicide by the Los Angeles County coroner's office, based on information about her overdosing and being prone to mood swings and suicidal thoughts.

Despite the coroner's findings, several alternative theories suggesting murder or accidental overdose have been proposed since the mid-1960s. Many of these involve U.S. president John F. Kennedy and his brother Robert F. Kennedy, as well as union leader Jimmy Hoffa and mob boss Sam Giancana. Because of the prevalence of these theories in the media, the office of the Los Angeles County District Attorney reviewed the case in 1982 but found no evidence to support them and did not disagree with the findings of the original investigation. However, the report conceded that "factual discrepancies" and "unanswered questions" remained in the case.

== Background ==
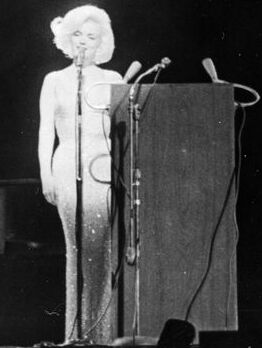
Monroe performing at President John F. Kennedy's birthday celebration at Madison Square Garden, less than three months before her death, May 1962

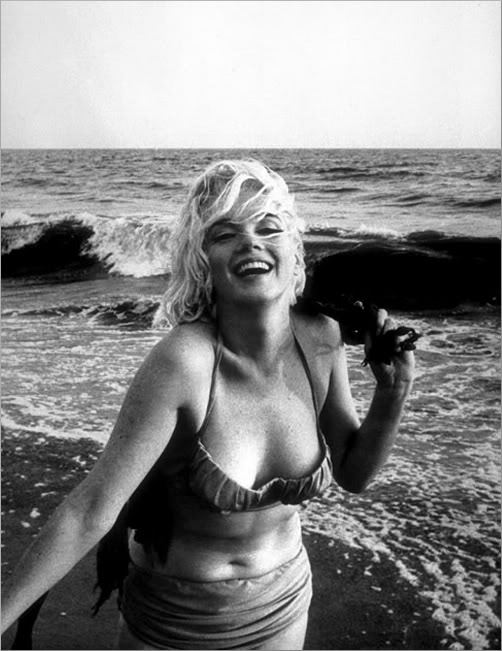
Monroe in one of her last photo shoots, taken by George Barris for Cosmopolitan, July 1962

For several years heading into the early 1960s, Marilyn Monroe had been dependent on amphetamines, barbiturates and alcohol, and she experienced various mental health problems that included depression, anxiety, low self-esteem and chronic insomnia. Monroe had acquired a reputation for being difficult to work with, and she frequently delayed productions by being late to film sets in addition to having trouble remembering her lines. She also had an FBI file open since 1956 due to her "problematic" relationship with accused communist, author Arthur Miller.

By 1960, Monroe's behavior was adversely affecting her career. For example, although she was the preferred choice of author Truman Capote to play Holly Golightly in the film adaptation of Breakfast at Tiffany's, Paramount Pictures declined to cast her due to fear that she would complicate the film's production. The last film Monroe completed, The Misfits (1961), was a commercial failure. During the filming, she had to spend a week detoxing in a hospital. Her third marriage, to Arthur Miller, also ended in divorce in January 1961.

Instead of working, Monroe spent a large part of 1961 preoccupied with health problems and did not work on any new film projects. She went under surgery for her endometriosis and a cholecystectomy, and spent four weeks in hospital care—including a brief stint in a mental ward—for depression. (Note: Monroe first admitted herself to the Payne Whitney Psychiatric Clinic in New York City, at the suggestion of her psychiatrist Marianne Kris. Kris later stated that her choice of hospital was a mistake: Monroe was placed on a ward meant for severely mentally ill people with psychosis, where she was locked in a padded cell and was not allowed to move to a more suitable ward or to leave the hospital. Monroe was finally able to leave the hospital after three days with the help of her ex-husband Joe DiMaggio and moved to the Columbia University Medical Center, spending a further twenty-three days there.) Later in 1961, she moved back to Los Angeles after six years in Manhattan; she purchased a Spanish hacienda-style house at 12305 Fifth Helena Drive in Brentwood. In early 1962, she received a "World Film Favorite" Golden Globe award and began to shoot a new film, Something's Got to Give, a remake of My Favorite Wife (1940).

Days before filming began, Monroe caught sinusitis; the studio, 20th Century Fox, was advised to postpone the production, but the advice was not heeded and filming began on schedule in late April. Monroe was too ill to work for the majority of the next six weeks, but despite confirmations by multiple doctors, Fox tried to pressure her by publicly alleging that she was faking her symptoms. On May 19, Monroe took a break from filming to sing "Happy Birthday" on stage at U.S. President John F. Kennedy's birthday celebration at Madison Square Garden ten days before his actual birthday. This caused a great amount of publicity for Monroe, but also significant speculation about an extramarital affair with the president and concerns from government agents.

After Monroe returned to Los Angeles, she resumed filming and celebrated her 36th birthday on the set of Something's Got to Give on June 1. She was again absent for several days, which led Fox to fire her on June 7 and sue her for breach of contract, demanding $750,000 in damages. Monroe was replaced by Lee Remick, but after co-star Dean Martin refused to make the film with anyone other than Monroe, Fox sued him as well and shut down the production.

Fox publicly blamed Monroe's drug dependency and alleged lack of professionalism for the demise of the film, even claiming that she was mentally disturbed. (Note: Their version remained largely uncontested until 1990, when the surviving footage from Something's Got to Give was released, showing that when Monroe had turned up on set, she had been coherent and able to film several scenes. According to a later statement by the film's producer Henry Weinstein, her dismissal was linked to the studio's severe financial problems and the inexperience of head executive Peter Levathes, rather than solely caused by her behavior.) To counter the negative publicity, Monroe gave interviews to several high-profile publications, such as Life, Cosmopolitan and Vogue, during the last weeks of her life. In 1961, the magazine Time wrote that "in seeking help, she may have done more than the psychiatrists to win popular acceptance of a more modern view of mental illness and treatment for it". After successfully renegotiating her contract with Fox, filming with Monroe was scheduled to resume in September on Something's Got to Give, and she made plans for starring in What a Way to Go! (1964) as well as a biopic about Jean Harlow.

== Timeline ==
Monroe spent the last day of her life, Saturday, August 4, 1962, at her Brentwood home. In the morning, she met photographer Lawrence Schiller to discuss the possibility of Playboy publishing nude photos taken of her on the set of Something's Got to Give. She also received a massage from her personal massage therapist, talked with friends on the phone, and signed for deliveries. Also present at the house that morning were her housekeeper, Eunice Murray, and her publicist Patricia Newcomb, who had stayed overnight. According to Newcomb, they had an argument because Monroe had not slept well the night before.

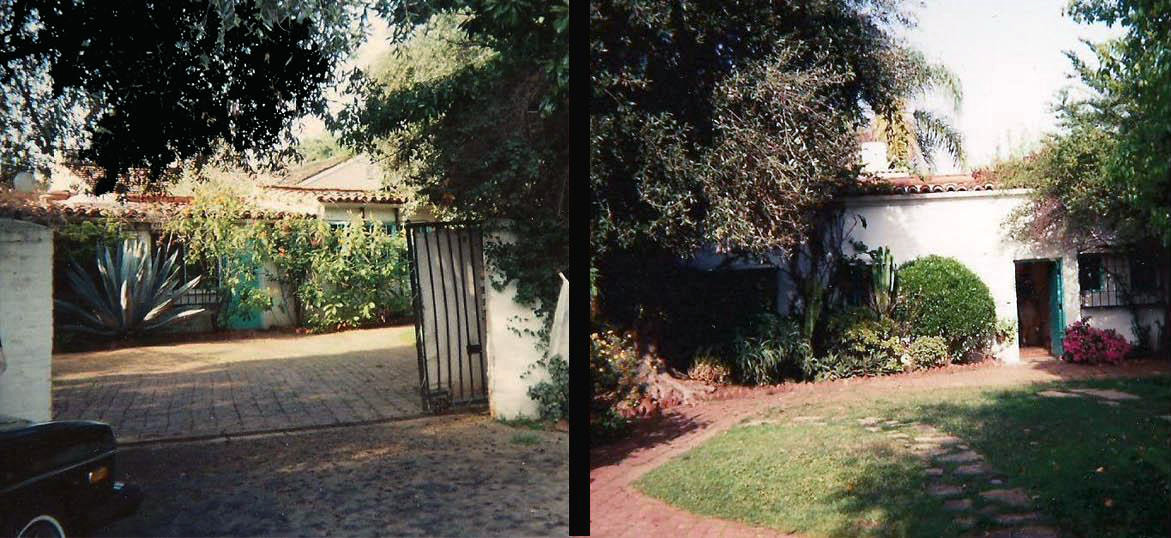
Monroe's house at 12305 Fifth Helena Drive in Los Angeles

At 4:30 p.m. PDT, Monroe's psychiatrist Ralph Greenson arrived at the house to conduct a therapy session and asked Newcomb to leave. Before Greenson left at around 7:00 p.m., he asked Murray to stay overnight and keep Monroe company. At approximately 7:00-7:15 p.m., Monroe received a call from Joe DiMaggio Jr., with whom she had stayed close since her divorce from his father, the elder Joe DiMaggio. DiMaggio told Monroe that he had broken up with a girlfriend she did not like, and he detected nothing alarming in Monroe's behavior. At around 7:40–7:45 p.m., Monroe telephoned Greenson to tell him the news about the breakup of DiMaggio and his girlfriend.

Monroe retired to her bedroom at around 8:00 p.m. She received a call from actor Peter Lawford, brother-in-law of President Kennedy, who was hoping to persuade her to attend his party that night. Lawford became alarmed because Monroe sounded like she was under the influence of drugs. She allegedly told him, "Say goodbye to Pat, say goodbye to the president, and say goodbye to yourself, because you're a nice guy", before drifting off. Unable to reach her again, Lawford called his agent Milton Ebbins, who unsuccessfully tried to reach Greenson and later called Monroe's lawyer, Milton A. "Mickey" Rudin. Rudin called Monroe's house and was assured by Murray that she was fine.

At approximately 3:30 a.m. on Sunday, August 5, Murray woke up "sensing that something was wrong" and saw light from under Monroe's bedroom door, but she was not able to get a response and found the door locked. Murray telephoned Greenson, on whose advice she looked in through a window, and saw Monroe lying facedown on her bed, nude and covered by a sheet and clutching a telephone receiver. Greenson arrived shortly thereafter. He entered the room by breaking a window and found Monroe dead. He called her physician, Hyman Engelberg, who arrived at the house at around 3:50 a.m. and officially confirmed the death. At 4:25 a.m., they notified the Los Angeles Police Department (LAPD).

== Inquest and 1982 review ==
Deputy coroner Thomas Noguchi conducted Monroe's autopsy on the same day that she was found dead, Sunday, August 5. The Los Angeles County coroner's office was assisted in the inquest by psychiatrists Norman Farberow, Robert Litman, and Norman Tabachnik from the Los Angeles Suicide Prevention Center, who interviewed Monroe's doctors and psychiatrists on her mental state. Based on the advanced state of rigor mortis at the time her body was discovered, it was estimated that she had died between 8:30 and 10:30 p.m. on August 4.

The toxicological analysis concluded that the cause of death was acute barbiturate poisoning; she had 8 mg% (mg/dl) of chloral hydrate and 4.5 mg% of pentobarbital (Nembutal) in her blood and a further 13 mg% of pentobarbital in her liver. The police found empty bottles of these medicines next to her bed. There were no signs of external wounds or bruises on the body.

The findings of the inquest were published on August 17; Chief Coroner Theodore Curphey classified Monroe's death a "probable suicide." The possibility of an accidental overdose was ruled out because the dosages found in her body were several times over the lethal limit and had been taken "in one gulp or in a few gulps over a minute or so." At the time of her death, Monroe was reported to have been in a "depressed mood", and had been "unkempt" and uninterested in maintaining her appearance. No suicide note was found, but Litman stated that this was not unusual, because statistics showed that less than forty percent of suicide victims left notes.

In their final report, Farberow, Litman, and Tabachnik stated:

Miss Monroe had suffered from psychiatric disturbance for a long time. She experienced severe fears and frequent depressions. Mood changes were abrupt and unpredictable. Among symptoms of disorganization, sleep disturbance was prominent, for which she had been taking sedative drugs for many years. She was thus familiar with and experienced in the use of sedative drugs and well aware of their dangers ... In our investigation we have learned that Miss Monroe had often expressed wishes to give up, to withdraw, and even to die. On more than one occasion in the past, she had made a suicide attempt, using sedative drugs. On these occasions, she had called for help and had been rescued. It is our opinion that the same pattern was repeated on the evening of Aug. 3 except for the rescue. It has been our practice with similar information collected in other cases in the past to recommend a certification for such deaths as probable suicide. Additional clues for suicide provided by the physical evidence are the high level of barbiturates and chloral hydrate in the blood which, with other evidence from the autopsy, indicates the probable ingestion of a large amount of drugs within a short period of time: the completely empty bottle of Nembutal, the prescription for which (25 capsules) was filled the day before the ingestion, and the locked door to the bedroom, which was unusual.

In the 1970s, claims surfaced that Monroe's death was a murder and not suicide. Due to these claims, Los Angeles County District Attorney John Van de Kamp assigned his colleague Ronald H. "Mike" Carroll to conduct a 1982 "threshold investigation" to see whether a criminal investigation should be opened. Carroll worked with Alan B. Tomich, an investigator for the district attorney's office, for over three months on an inquiry that resulted in a thirty-page report. They did not find any credible evidence to support the theory that Monroe was murdered.

In 1983, Noguchi published his memoirs, in which he discussed Monroe's case and the allegations of discrepancies in the autopsy and the coroner's ruling of suicide. These included the claims that Monroe could not have ingested the pills because her stomach was empty; that Nembutal capsules should have left yellow residue; that she may have been administered an enema; and that the autopsy noted no needle marks despite the fact that she routinely received injections from her doctors. Noguchi explained that hemorrhaging of the stomach lining indicated that the medication had been administered orally, and that because Monroe had been an addict for several years the pills would have been absorbed more rapidly than in the case of non-addicts. Noguchi also denied that Nembutal leaves dye residue, and he noted that only very recent needle marks are visible on a body, and that the only bruise he noted on Monroe's body, on her lower back, was superficial and its placement indicated that it was accidental and not linked to foul play. Noguchi finally concluded that based on his observations, the most probable conclusion is that Monroe committed suicide.

== Public reactions and funeral ==
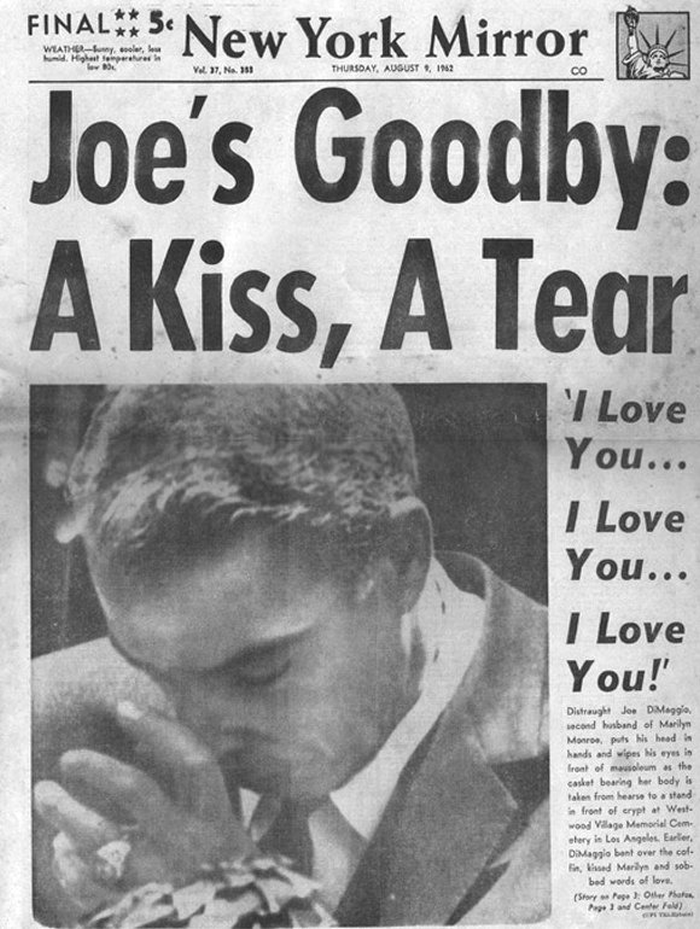
Monroe's former husband Joe DiMaggio mourning at her funeral. New York Daily Mirror front page, August 9, 1962.

Monroe's unexpected death was front-page news in the United States and Europe. According to biographer Lois Banner, "it's said that the suicide rate in Los Angeles doubled the month after she died; the circulation rate of most newspapers expanded that month." The Chicago Tribune reported that they had received hundreds of phone calls from members of the public requesting information about her death. French filmmaker Jean Cocteau commented that her death "should serve as a terrible lesson to all those, whose chief occupation consists of spying on and tormenting film stars", her former co-star Laurence Olivier deemed her "the complete victim of ballyhoo and sensation", and Bus Stop director Joshua Logan stated that she was "one of the most unappreciated people in the world".

Monroe's funeral was held on August 8 at the Westwood Village Memorial Park Cemetery, where her foster parents Ana Lower and Grace McKee Goddard had also been buried. The service was arranged by her former husband Joe DiMaggio, her half-sister Berniece Baker Miracle and her business manager Inez Melson, who decided to invite only around thirty of her closest family members and friends, excluding most of the film industry professionals who had worked with Monroe. Police were present to keep away journalists and photographers and to control the several hundred spectators who crowded the streets around the cemetery.

The funeral service, presided over by a local minister, was conducted at the cemetery's chapel. Monroe was laid out in a green Emilio Pucci dress and held a bouquet of small pink roses. Her longtime make-up artist and friend, Allan "Whitey" Snyder, had done her make-up. The eulogy was delivered by her acting coach Lee Strasberg, and a selection from Tchaikovsky's Sixth Symphony as well as a record of Judy Garland (who would also die of a barbiturate overdose nearly 7 years later) singing "Over the Rainbow" were played. Monroe was interred at crypt No. 24 at the Corridor of Memories. DiMaggio arranged for red roses to be placed in a vase attached to the crypt three times a week; twenty years later he canceled that arrangement.

In 1992, Hugh Hefner paid $75,000 to be interred at Westwood Memorial Park, in the crypt beside Monroe's. In 2009, he said to the Los Angeles Times: "Spending eternity next to Marilyn is an opportunity too sweet to pass up." In 2022, The Independent referred to her death as a "global obsession".

== Administration of estate ==
In her will, Monroe left several thousand dollars to her half-sister Berniece Baker Miracle and her secretary May Reis, a share for the education of her friend Norman Rosten's daughter, and established a $100,000 trust fund to cover the costs of the care of her birth mother, Gladys Pearl Baker, and the widow of her acting teacher Michael Chekhov. From the remaining estate she granted twenty-five percent to her former psychiatrist Marianne Kris "for the furtherance of the work of such psychiatric institutions or groups as she shall elect", and seventy-five percent, including her personal effects, film royalties and real estate, to Strasberg, whom she instructed to distribute her effects "among my friends, colleagues and those to whom I am devoted". Due to legal complications, the beneficiaries were not paid until 1971.

When Strasberg died in 1982, his estate was willed to his widow Anna, who claimed Monroe's publicity rights and began to license her image to companies. In 1990, she unsuccessfully sued the Anna Freud Centre, to which Kris had bequeathed her Monroe rights, in an attempt to gain full rights to Monroe's estate. In 1996, Anna Strasberg hired CMG Worldwide, a celebrity-legacy licensing group, to manage the licensing rights.

Anna Strasberg went on to prevent Odyssey Group, Inc. from auctioning effects that Monroe's business manager Inez Melson, who had also been named Monroe's special administrator of estate, handed down to her nephew, Millington Conroy. Between 1996 and 2001, CMG entered into 700 licensing agreements with merchandisers. Against Monroe's wishes, Lee Strasberg had never distributed her effects amongst her friends, and in 1999 Anna commissioned Christie's to auction them, netting $13.4 million. In 2000, she founded Marilyn Monroe LLC.

Marilyn Monroe LLC's claim to exclusive ownership of Monroe's publicity rights became subject to a "landmark [legal] case" in 2006, when the heirs of three freelance photographers who had photographed her—Sam Shaw, Milton Greene, and Tom Kelley—successfully challenged the company in courts in California and New York State. In May 2007, the courts determined that Monroe could not have passed her publicity rights to her estate, as the first law granting such right, the California Celebrities Rights Act, was not passed until 1985. (Note: Soon after, in October 2007, California Governor Arnold Schwarzenegger signed Senate Bill 771, for which Anna Strasberg and the Screen Actors Guild amongst others had lobbied, and which established that non-family members may inherit rights of publicity through the residuary clause of the deceased's will, provided that the person was a resident of California at the time of death. It did not help the estate, as the United States District Court in Los Angeles ruled in March 2008 that Monroe was a resident of New York at the time of her death, citing the statement of the executor of her estate to California tax authorities, and a 1966 affidavit by her housekeeper. The decision was reaffirmed by the United States District Court of New York in September 2008. Anna Strasberg was subsequently fined $200,000 and ordered to pay $30,000 by a New York court "for delaying the handing over of documents showing that Monroe was legally a New Yorker on her death".)

Monroe's estate terminated their business relationship with CMG Worldwide in 2010, and sold the licensing rights to Authentic Brands Group the following year. Also in 2010, the estate sold Monroe's Brentwood home for $3.8 million, and published a selection of her private notes, diaries and correspondence as a book called Fragments: Poems, Intimate Notes, Letters.

== Conspiracy theories ==
=== 1960s: Frank A. Capell, Jack Clemmons ===
During the 1960s, there were no widespread conspiracy theories about Monroe's death. The first allegations that she had been murdered originated in anti-communist activist Frank A. Capell's self-published pamphlet The Strange Death of Marilyn Monroe (1964), in which he claimed that her death was part of a communist conspiracy. Capell claimed that Monroe and U.S. Attorney General Robert F. Kennedy had an affair, and that Monroe had threatened to cause a scandal, leading Kennedy to order her to be assassinated. In addition to accusing Kennedy of being a communist sympathizer, Capell also claimed that many other people close to Monroe, such as her doctors and ex-husband Arthur Miller, were communists.

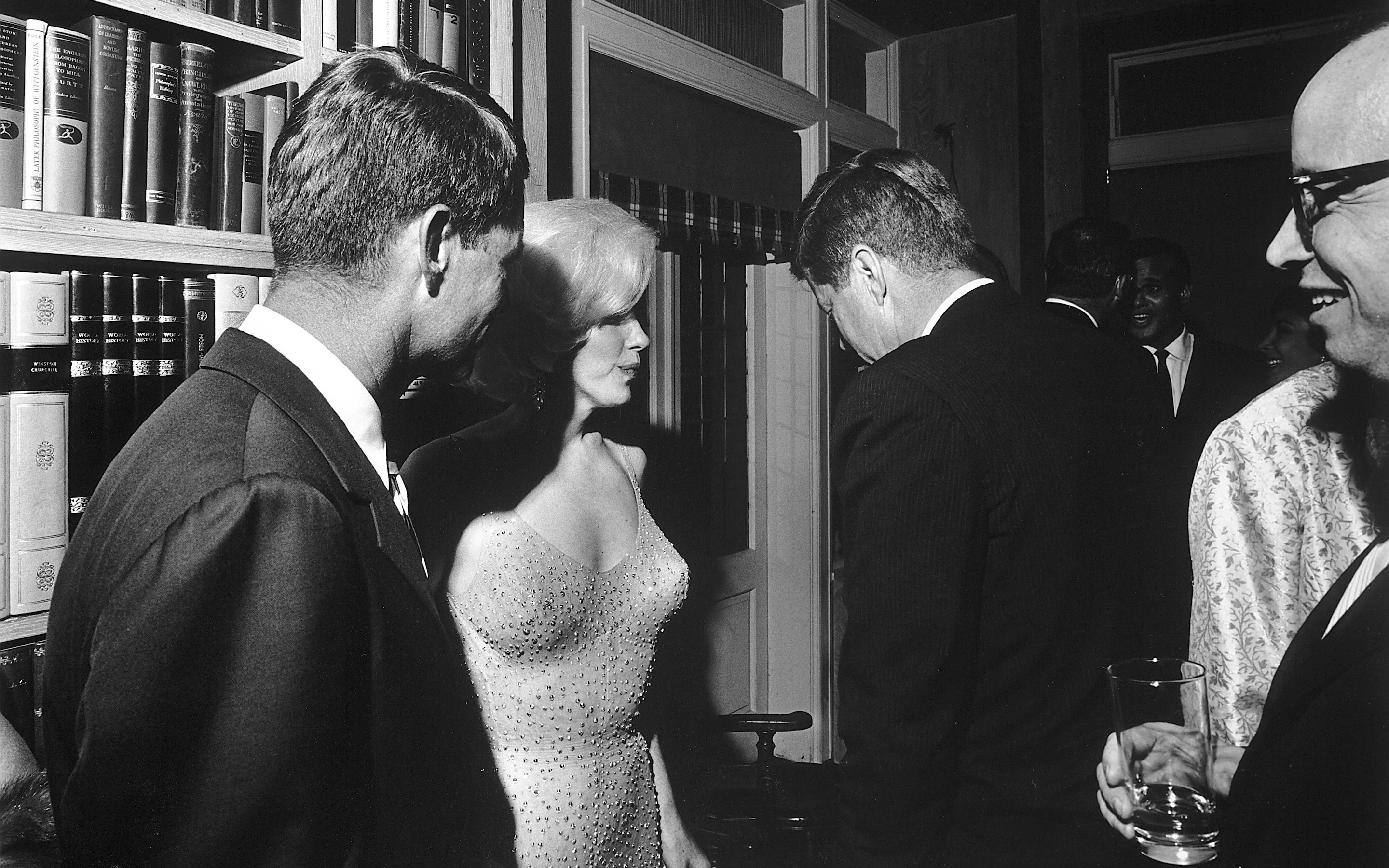
Monroe with U.S. Attorney General Robert F. Kennedy, President John F. Kennedy, and Arthur M. Schlesinger Jr. at a private party in the midtown Manhattan penthouse home of Arthur B. Krim and Mathilde Krim that celebrated JFK's birthday 10 days before his actual birthday; Monroe had sung "Happy Birthday" to him publicly earlier that night; she died 77 days later.

Capell's credibility has been seriously questioned because his only source was columnist Walter Winchell, who in turn had received much of his information from Capell; Capell, therefore, was citing himself. Capell's friend, LAPD Sergeant Jack Clemmons, aided him in developing his pamphlet; Clemmons, who was the first police officer on the scene of Monroe's death, became a central source for conspiracy theorists. He later made claims that he had not mentioned in the official 1962 investigation: he alleged that when he arrived at Monroe's house, Murray was washing her sheets in the laundry, and he had "a sixth sense" that something was wrong.

Capell and Clemmons' allegations have been linked to their political goals. Capell dedicated his life to revealing an "International Communist Conspiracy" and Clemmons was a member of the Police and Fire Research Organization (FiPo), which sought to expose "subversive activities which threaten our American way of life". FiPo and similar organizations were known for their stance against the Kennedys and for sending letters to the FBI incriminating them; a 1964 FBI file that speculated on an affair between Monroe and Robert F. Kennedy is likely to have come from them. Furthermore, Capell, Clemmons, and a third person were indicted in 1965 by a California grand jury for "conspiracy to libel by obtaining and distributing a false affidavit" claiming that U.S. Senator Thomas Kuchel had once been arrested for a homosexual act in retaliation for Kuchel's support of the Civil Rights Act of 1964. Capell pleaded guilty, and charges against Clemmons were dropped after he resigned from the LAPD.

In the 1960s, Monroe's death was also discussed in Charles Hamblett's Who Killed Marilyn Monroe? (1966) and in James A. Hudson's The Mysterious Death of Marilyn Monroe (1968). Neither Capell's, Hamblett's, or Hudson's accounts were widely disseminated.

=== 1970s: Norman Mailer, Robert Slatzer, Anthony Scaduto ===
The allegations of murder first became part of mainstream discussion with the publication of Norman Mailer's Marilyn: A Biography in 1973. Despite not having any evidence, Mailer repeated the claim that Monroe and Robert F. Kennedy had an affair and speculated that she was killed by either the FBI or the Central Intelligence Agency (CIA), who wished to use the murder as a "point of pressure ... against the Kennedys". The book was heavily criticized in reviews, and later that year Mailer recanted his allegations in an interview with Mike Wallace for 60 Minutes, stating that he had made them to ensure commercial success for his book, and that he believes Monroe's death was "ten to one" an "accidental suicide".

Two years later, Robert F. Slatzer published The Life and Curious Death of Marilyn Monroe (1975), based on Capell's pamphlet. In addition to his assertion that Monroe was killed by Robert F. Kennedy, Slatzer also controversially claimed to have been married to Monroe in Mexico for three days in October 1952, and that they had remained close friends until her death. Although his account was not widely circulated at the time, it has remained central to conspiracy theories.

In October 1975, music journalist Anthony Scaduto published an article about Monroe's death in soft porn magazine Oui, and the following year expanded his account into book form as Who Killed Marilyn Monroe? (1976), published under the pen name Tony Sciacca. His only sources were Slatzer and his private investigator, Milo Speriglio. In addition to repeating Slatzer's claims, Scaduto alleged that Monroe had kept a red diary in which she had written confidential political information she had heard from the Kennedys, and that her house had been wiretapped by surveillance expert Bernard Spindel on the orders of union leader Jimmy Hoffa, who was hoping to obtain incriminating information against the Kennedys.

=== 1980s: Milo Speriglio, Anthony Summers ===
In 1982, Speriglio published Marilyn Monroe: Murder Cover-Up, in which he claimed that Monroe had been murdered by Hoffa and mob boss Sam Giancana. Basing his account on Slatzer and Scaduto's books, Speriglio added statements made by Lionel Grandison, who worked at the Los Angeles County coroner's office at the time of Monroe's death. Grandison claimed that Monroe's body had been extensively bruised but this had been omitted from the autopsy report, and that he had seen the "red diary", but it had mysteriously disappeared.

Speriglio and Slatzer demanded that the investigation into Monroe's death be re-opened by authorities, and the Los Angeles District Attorney agreed to review the case. The new investigation could not find any evidence to support the murder claims. Grandison was found not to be a reliable witness as he had been fired from the coroner's office for stealing from corpses. The allegations that Monroe's home was wiretapped by Spindel were also found to be false. Spindel's apartment had been raided by the Manhattan District Attorney's office in 1966, during which his tapes were seized. Spindel later made a claim that he had wiretapped Monroe's house, but it was not supported by the contents of the tapes, to which the investigators had listened.

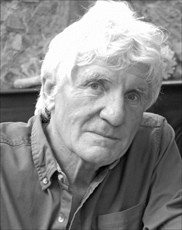
Journalist Anthony Summers, one of the most prominent biographers to allege that Monroe's death involved a cover-up

The most prominent Monroe biographer in the 1980s was British journalist Anthony Summers, who wrote that Monroe's death was an accidental overdose enabled and covered up by Robert F. Kennedy. His investigation on Monroe began as an assignment for the British tabloid the Sunday Express to cover the Los Angeles District Attorney's 1982 review. Summers' book, Goddess: The Secret Lives of Marilyn Monroe (1985), became one of the most commercially successful Monroe biographies. Prior to writing on Monroe, he authored a book on the assassination of John F. Kennedy.

According to Summers, Monroe had severe substance abuse problems and was psychotic in the last months of her life. He alleges that Monroe had affairs with both John and Robert Kennedy, and that when Robert ended their affair she threatened to reveal their association. Kennedy and Lawford attempted to prevent this by enabling her addictions. According to Summers, Monroe became hysterical and accidentally overdosed, dying in an ambulance on the way to the hospital. Kennedy wanted to leave Los Angeles before Monroe's death became public to avoid being associated with it, and therefore her body was returned to her bedroom and the overdose staged as a suicide by Lawford, the Kennedys and J. Edgar Hoover.

Summers based his account on interviews he had conducted with 650 people connected to Monroe, but his research has been criticized by biographers Donald Spoto and Sarah Churchwell. According to Spoto, Summers contradicts himself, presents false information as fact, and misrepresents what some of Monroe's friends said about her. Churchwell writes that while Summers accumulated a large collection of anecdotal material, most of the allegations are speculation; many of the people he interviewed could provide only second- or third-hand accounts, and they "relate what they believe, not what they demonstrably know". Summers was also the first major biographer to find Slatzer a credible witness, and relies heavily on testimonies by other controversial witnesses, including Jack Clemmons and Jeanne Carmen, a model-actress whose claim to have been Monroe's close friend has been disputed by Spoto and Lois Banner.

Summers' allegations formed the basis for the BBC documentary Marilyn: Say Goodbye to the President (1985), and for a 26-minute segment produced for ABC's 20/20. The 20/20 segment was never aired, as ABC President Roone Arledge decided that the claims made in it required more evidence to back them up. Summers claimed that Arledge's decision was influenced by pressure from the Kennedy family.

=== 1990s: Brown and Barham, Donald H. Wolfe, Donald Spoto ===
In the 1990s, two new books alleged that Monroe was murdered: Peter Brown and Patte Barham's Marilyn: The Last Take (1992) and Donald H. Wolfe's The Last Days of Marilyn Monroe (1998). Neither presented much new evidence but relied extensively on Capell and Summers as well as on discredited witnesses such as Grandison, Slatzer, Clemmons, and Carmen; Wolfe also did not provide any sources for many of his claims and disregarded many of the findings of the autopsy without explanation.

In his 1993 biography of Monroe, Donald Spoto disputed the previous conspiracy theories but alleged that Monroe's death was an accidental overdose staged as a suicide. According to him, Monroe's doctors Greenson (psychiatrist) and Engelberg (personal physician) had been trying to stop her abuse of Nembutal. In order to monitor her drug use, they had agreed to never prescribe her anything without first consulting with each other. Monroe was able to persuade Engelberg to break his promise by lying to him that Greenson had agreed to it. She took several Nembutals on August 4 but did not tell this to Greenson, who prescribed her a chloral hydrate enema; the combination of these two drugs killed her. Afraid of the consequences, the doctors and Murray then staged the death as a suicide.

Spoto argued that Monroe could not have been suicidal because she had reached a new agreement with Fox and because she was allegedly going to remarry DiMaggio. He based his theory of her death on alleged discrepancies in the police statements given by Monroe's housekeeper and doctors, a claim made by Monroe's publicist Arthur P. Jacobs's wife that he had been alerted of the death already at 10:30 p.m., as well as on claims made by prosecutor John Miner, who was involved in the official investigation. Miner had alleged that her autopsy revealed signs more consistent with an enema than oral ingestion.

=== 2000s: John Miner, Matthew Smith ===
Miner's allegations that Monroe's death was not a suicide received more publicity in the 2000s, when he published transcripts that he claimed to have made from audiotapes that Monroe recorded shortly before her death. Miner claimed that Monroe gave the tapes to Greenson, who invited him to listen to them after her death. On the tapes, Monroe spoke of her plans for the future, which Miner argues is proof that she could not have killed herself. She also discussed her sex life and use of enemas; Miner alleged that Monroe was killed by an enema that was administered by Murray.

Miner's allegations have received criticism. During the official review of the case by the district attorney in 1982, he told the investigators about the tapes, but did not mention that he had transcripts of them. Miner claimed that this was because Greenson had sworn him to silence. The tapes themselves have never been found, and Miner remains the only person to claim they existed. Greenson was already dead before Miner went public with them.

Biographer Lois Banner knew Miner personally because they both worked at the University of Southern California; she further challenged the authenticity of the transcripts. Miner had once lost his license to practice law for several years, lied to Banner about having worked for the Kinsey Institute, and had gone bankrupt shortly before selling the alleged transcripts. He had first attempted to sell the transcripts to Vanity Fair, but when the magazine had asked him to show them to Summers in order to validate them, it had become apparent that he did not have them.

The transcripts, which Miner sold to British author Matthew Smith, were therefore written several decades after he alleged to have listened to the tapes. Miner's claim that Monroe's housekeeper was in fact her nurse and administered her enemas on a regular basis is also not supported by evidence. Furthermore, Banner wrote that Miner had a personal obsession about enemas and practiced sadomasochism; she concluded that his theory about Monroe's death "represented his sexual interests" and was not based on evidence.

Smith published the transcripts as part of his book Victim: The Secret Tapes of Marilyn Monroe (2003). He asserted that Monroe was murdered by the CIA due to her association with Robert F. Kennedy, as the agency wanted revenge for the Kennedys' handling of the Bay of Pigs Invasion. Smith had already written about the topic in his previous book, The Men Who Murdered Marilyn (1996). Noting that Smith included no footnotes in his 1996 book and only eight in Victim, Churchwell has called his account "a tissue of conjecture, speculation and pure fiction as documentary fact" and "arguably the least factual of all Marilyn lives". The Miner transcripts were also discussed in a 2005 Los Angeles Times article.

In 2012, Monroe's niece, Mona Rae Miracle, disputed the conspiracy theories. She said Monroe had many appointments scheduled for August 5, 1962 including meetings with a 20th Century Fox producer and a lawyer to change her will. Miracle also said Monroe planned to remarry Joe DiMaggio, adding that her death was just an accident.

=== 2020s: Mike Rothmiller, Douglas Thompson ===
Mike Rothmiller, who worked for 10 years in the LAPD, including 5 years with the Organized Crime Intelligence Division (OCID), had direct personal access to hundreds of restricted LAPD files related to Monroe's death. Along with Douglas Thompson, he authored Bombshell: The Night Bobby Kennedy Killed Marilyn Monroe. He claimed that "If I [had] presented my evidence in any court of law, I'd get a conviction."

Ian Ayres' three-part ARTE production Marilyn Monroe – Fame at Any Price (F 2022) is part of the biographical Marilyn reappraisals released in 2022 to mark the 60th anniversary of her death — prominently flanked by the Netflix documentary The Mystery of Marilyn Monroe: The Unheard Tapes, which is based on Anthony Summers' original recordings. Both films draw on the same pool of sources (Summers, the Spindel wiretap thesis, Giancana/Double Cross) and dramaturgically arrive at similar conclusions: away from the official "probable suicide", toward a political-criminal scenario centered on the Kennedys, FBI, CIA, and the Mafia.
