= The Mystery of Marilyn Monroe: The Unheard Tapes =

2022 American documentary film

- Promotional poster
- Directed by: Emma Cooper
- Music by: Anne Nikitin
- Distributed by: Netflix
- Release date: April 27, 2022
- Running time: 101 minutes
- Country: United States
- Language: English

The Mystery of Marilyn Monroe: The Unheard Tapes is a 2022 American documentary film directed by Emma Cooper for Netflix. It is centered on the life and untimely death of American actress and cultural icon Marilyn Monroe and is told through archival footage and unseen interviews with friends of the star. The film was released on April 27, 2022.

Between April 24, 2022 and May 8, 2022 the show was watched for 22.95 million hours globally.

== Synopsis ==
Anthony Summers, the author of the book Goddess (1985), explains he began researching Marilyn Monroe after he learned that the Los Angeles County District Attorney was reopening the case of her death. Summers subsequently spent three years collecting 650 tape-recorded interviews with people who either knew Monroe in her lifetime or had knowledge concerning her death. The audio of the interviews is original, but actors perform lip-synced reenactments.

As Monroe began acting, she had affairs with multiple powerful men who helped advance her career. Fellow actor Jane Russell notes Monroe had a particularly strong work ethic. However, Monroe suffered from poor mental health stemming from a troubled childhood.

Monroe's third husband, writer Arthur Miller, was affiliated with communism. Both he and Monroe were observed by the FBI, and the couple was known to socialize with communist American expatriates while abroad. As their marriage deteriorated, Monroe abused prescription drugs and she became increasingly difficult to work with. In 1961, she and Miller divorced.

In 1954, Arthur James, who knew Monroe through Charles Chaplin Jr., saw President John F. Kennedy and Monroe walking on the shore, near the Malibu Pier, and drinking at the hangout, Malibu Cottage. Monroe met the Kennedy family in the early 1950s, through Hollywood connections that likely evolved from the founding role of Joseph P. Kennedy Sr. at RKO Pictures during the 1920s. In the early 1960s, actor Peter Lawford and his wife, Patricia Kennedy Lawford, had a beach house in Malibu, California, where they hosted many social gatherings. Monroe had affairs with both President Kennedy and United States Attorney General Robert F. Kennedy, often meeting them at the beach house.

Summers pieces together that Monroe was in a risky political position, as she and the Kennedy brothers would discuss current events, including nuclear weapons testing. This was in 1962, during the height of the Cold War. Because of Monroe's leftist politics, the FBI worried she could pass along or make public anything the Kennedys told her. As a result, the Kennedy brothers eventually attempted to cut off all contact with her.

Monroe died on August 4, 1962, and it was ruled a probable suicide. The official timeline reports Monroe's housekeeper, Eunice Murray, checked on Monroe around 3 am and found the bedroom door locked. Murray called Monroe's psychiatrist, Dr. Ralph Greenson, who arrived around 3:30 am, broke in through a window, and discovered Monroe was dead. Paramedics and police arrived at 4:25 am. Her death was ruled a probable suicide due to a drug overdose.

Summers discounts this timeline, as multiple interview subjects corroborate a rough sequence of events, although there are discrepancies. In this version, Monroe's medical emergency began earlier that night. Her public relations manager, Arthur P. Jacobs, arrived at Monroe's residence as early as 11 pm. An ambulance was called, and Dr. Greenson rode with a comatose Monroe as she was transported to a hospital. She either died at the hospital or on the way. Her body was returned to her house, where she was placed in her bed and "discovered" in the early morning hours. Private investigator Fred Otash and surveillance expert Reed Wilson claim they were hired by Peter Lawford to clear Monroe's home of any evidence that connected her to the Kennedy family before police and reporters arrived.

Despite Summers having accumulated information that was previously unknown about Monroe's death, he doesn't believe she was murdered. Rather, he maintains Monroe died by suicide or an accidental drug overdose. He suspects any type of cover-up was due to her connection with the Kennedy brothers. In 1982, the Los Angeles district attorney ended its review of the case and upheld the original recorded cause of death.

== Interview subjects ==
In order of appearance:

- Al Rosen – agent who knew Monroe early in her career
- Gloria Romanoff – friend and owner of Romanoff's restaurant
- Jane Russell – Monroe costar in Gentlemen Prefer Blondes (1953)
- John Huston – the film director who directed Monroe in The Asphalt Jungle (1950) and The Misfits (1961)
- Danny Greenson – son of the late psychiatrist Ralph Greenson
- Joan Greenson – daughter of Ralph Greenson
- Hildi Greenson – widow of Ralph Greenson
- Billy Wilder – film director who directed Monroe in The Seven Year Itch (1955).
- Gladys Whitten – hairdresser on The Seven Year Itch (1955)
- Peggy Feury – actress who knew Monroe through the Actors Studio
- Henry Rosenfeld – close friend and dress manufacturer
- Arthur James – property developer and longtime friend
- Milton H. Greene – photographer and partner in MM Productions
- Sydney Guilaroff – hairdresser on The Misfits (1961)
- Jeanne Martin – actor and wife of Dean Martin
- Fred Otash – private investigator
- Robin Thorne – nurse to film director George Cukor, who directed Monroe in the unfinished film Something's Got to Give
- John Danoff – private investigator for Fred Otash
- Angie Novello – personal secretary to Robert F. Kennedy
- Natalie Trundy as Natalie Jacobs – wife of Arthur P. Jacobs, public relations manager for Monroe
- Ken Hunter – ambulance attendant for Schaefer Ambulance
- Walt Schaefer – owner of Schaefer Ambulance
- John Sherlock – writer and journalist
- Bill Woodfield – photographer and journalist
- Harry Hall – law enforcement informant
- Reed Wilson – surveillance expert who worked with Fred Otash
- Eunice Murray – Monroe's housekeeper
- Jim Doyle – senior FBI agent
- Peter Lawford – actor and husband of Patricia Kennedy Lawford
