= Alan Ladd Jr. =

American film producer (1937–2022)

- Born: Alan Walbridge Ladd Jr. October 22, 1937; Los Angeles, California, U.S.
- Died: March 2, 2022 (aged 84); Los Angeles, California, U.S.
- Occupation: Film producer
- Years active: 1963–2007
- Spouses: Patricia Ann Beazley (m. 1959; div. 1983); Cindra Ladd (m. 1985, divorced)
- Children: 4
- Father: Alan Ladd
- Relatives: David Ladd (paternal half-brother); Cheryl Ladd (sister-in-law); Jordan Ladd (niece)

Alan Walbridge Ladd Jr. (October 22, 1937 – March 2, 2022) was an American film industry executive and producer. He was president of 20th Century Fox from 1976 to 1979, during which he approved the production of Star Wars, based on his confidence in George Lucas, which proved well-founded. He later established The Ladd Company and headed MGM/UA. Ladd won an Academy Award for Best Picture in 1996 for producing Braveheart.

== Early life ==
Ladd was born in Los Angeles, California, on October 22, 1937. He was the only child of Alan Ladd and Marjorie Jane (née Harrold), who divorced when he was two years old. He initially stayed with his mother, but lived with his father at his estate in Holmby Hills due to her poor health. He later recounted how the time he spent with his father was sparse, and described their relationship as "basically nonexistent". Ladd served in the U.S. Air Force and was called up as a reservist during the Berlin Crisis of 1961, before being employed by his stepfather's business for a brief period. He subsequently joined Creative Management Associates as an agent in 1963 and worked under Freddie Fields. Among Ladd's clients were Robert Redford and Judy Garland. His paternal half-brother is actor and producer David Ladd.

== Career ==
Ladd relocated to London at the end of the 1960s to work as an independent producer. There, he established a film venture with Jay Kanter and Jerry Gershwin. Ladd made nine films during his sojourn there, including The Walking Stick, A Severed Head, Villain, The Nightcomers, and X Y & Zee. He eventually returned to the United States in 1973 to become vice president of creative affairs at 20th Century Fox. Three years later, he was promoted from worldwide production head to president of Fox's film division.

Ladd came to Fox President Gordon Stulberg to request consideration for making George Lucas's Star Wars. Stulberg approved the production, and the two men remained as Lucas's support at times when the board of directors of 20th Century Fox wished to shut down production. The production was plagued by location difficulties, story problems, and budgetary disagreements for a project that was mainly considered a risk to the studio. However, when Ladd saw the audience's rapturous appreciation of the film at its first public screening at the Northpoint Theatre in San Francisco in early May 1977, he was moved to joyful tears at seeing the unlikely production he and Stulberg had supported against all odds culminating in spectacular vindication in their faith in Lucas. Star Wars was a massive and critically hailed hit upon release, becoming, up to that point, the highest-grossing film of all time, and spawned an extensive media franchise that includes many other films as well as television, radio, video game, and print media.

Star Wars and Alien were a few of the films produced during Ladd's tenure. However, he stepped down and left Fox in 1979 after falling out with Fox chairman Dennis Stanfill. Ladd founded his own production company, The Ladd Company, with Kanter and Gareth Wigan. The company produced Chariots of Fire, which won the Academy Award for Best Picture in 1982. Other productions included Outland (1981), Night Shift, Blade Runner (both 1982), The Right Stuff (1983), Police Academy (1984), and Gone Baby Gone (2007).

Ladd joined MGM/UA in 1985, eventually becoming chairman and CEO of MGM-Pathé Communications. During his tenure, MGM/UA produced Moonstruck (1987), A Fish Called Wanda (1988), and Thelma & Louise (1991). After being unceremoniously dismissed by Credit Lyonnais (who administered MGM after a loan default), he proceeded to reform the Ladd Company with Paramount Pictures in 1993. He produced The Brady Bunch Movie and Braveheart, one of the two projects he was permitted to take with him after leaving MGM. The latter film won the Academy Award for Best Picture in 1995, with Ladd receiving the award as one of the film's three producers. He later received the 2,348th star on the Hollywood Walk of Fame on September 28, 2007.

== Personal life and death ==
Ladd married his first wife, Patricia Ann Beazley, in September 1959. They met while studying at the University of Southern California together. They had three children, Kelliann, Tracy, and Amanda, but divorced in 1983. Ladd married his second wife, Cindra Pincock, in 1985. They had one child, Chelsea, who predeceased him in March 2021. Ladd and Pincock separated in March 2015 and later divorced.

Ladd died of kidney failure at his home in Los Angeles on March 2, 2022, at the age of 84.

== Filmography ==
Ladd was a producer of all films unless otherwise noted.

Year	Film	Credit	Notes
1970	The Walking Stick		
1970	Tam Lin		
1970	A Severed Head		
1971	Villain		
1971	The Nightcomers	Executive producer	Uncredited
1972	X Y & Zee		
1972	Fear Is the Key		
1984	Police Academy	Executive producer	Uncredited
1988	Vice Versa	Executive producer	
1990	Death Warrant		Uncredited
1995	The Brady Bunch Movie	Executive producer	
1995	Braveheart		
1996	The Phantom		
1996	A Very Brady Sequel		
1998	The Man in the Iron Mask	Executive producer	
2005	An Unfinished Life		
2007	Gone Baby Gone		
2022	Elvis		Dedicated to his memory
