= Patricia Newcomb =

American publicist and producer (born 1930)

- Born: Margot Patricia Newcomb; July 9, 1930 (age 96); Washington, D.C., U.S.
- Education: Immaculate Heart School; Mills College
- Spouse: Gareth Wigan (m. 1982; died 2010)
- Relatives: Carman A. Newcomb

Margot Patricia "Pat" Newcomb Wigan (born July 9, 1930) is an American publicist and producer. After working for Pierre Salinger, she was hired by the agency of Arthur P. Jacobs and briefly represented Marilyn Monroe in 1956. In 1960, she became Monroe's permanent publicist until her death. She later worked for Barbra Streisand and Natalie Wood. She also worked for the United States Information Agency and assisted Robert F. Kennedy in his political campaigns. In 1969, she founded the Pickwick Public Relations Agency and became vice president of motion picture production at MGM in 1985. She was married to producer Gareth Wigan, who died in 2010.

== Early life ==
Margot Patricia "Pat" Newcomb was born on July 9, 1930, in Washington, D.C. She grew up in Chevy Chase, Maryland. Her mother, Lillian Levie (1906–2000) was a social worker and married Carman A. Newcomb Jr. (1898–1978) in 1929, who was the son of U.S. House Representative Carman A. Newcomb and an American lawyer. He represented coal companies owned by George Skakel, father of Ethel Kennedy. Due to his work, the family moved to California in 1946, where Patricia attended the Immaculate Heart High School. In 1952, she graduated in psychology at the Mills College in Oakland. Patricia has a sister named Hope Adrian.

== Career ==
Newcomb was introduced to Robert Kennedy, while working for his later press secretary, Pierre Salinger, as a researcher. She later worked for the public relations agency of Arthur P. Jacobs, becoming the publicist of Marilyn Monroe in 1960 and remaining in this position until Monroe's death in 1962.

In the next years, Newcomb continued to work in Hollywood, representing Barbra Streisand and Natalie Wood, among other celebrities, and working for film productions, such as Hello, Dolly! (starring Streisand) and Ordinary People. She was an information specialist in the United States Information Agency and a consultant to the Justice Department, after helping in the senatorial campaign of Robert Kennedy in 1964. Newcomb was also Kennedy's campaign manager in the 1968 presidential election, working for him until his assassination. In 1970, Newcomb campaigned for democrat Eunice Kennedy. A year prior, she founded the Pickwick Public Relations agency with Pat Kingsley and Lois Weber Smith. In 1985, Newcomb was named vice-president of motion picture production at MGM.

== Marilyn Monroe ==
Newcomb became the publicist of Monroe in 1956, during the filming of Bus Stop. She was later replaced, but rehired in 1960, after Monroe's publicist Rupert Allan moved to Monaco to represent Grace Kelly. Newcomb accompanied Monroe to many events, including the president’s birthday celebration at Madison Square Garden on May 19, 1962, where she performed "Happy Birthday, Mr. President". Newcomb bought Monroe her dog Maf and remained her publicist until Monroe's death on August 4, 1962. The night before, Newcomb had slept at Monroe’s residence at 12305 Fifth Helena Drive, before waking up around noon and having an argument with Monroe near the pool.

At 4:30 p.m., Monroe's psychiatrist Ralph Greenson joined them to conduct therapy on Monroe, demanding that Newcomb leave. Though it is uncertain at what time Newcomb learned of her client’s death, she arrived at 12305 Fifth Helena Drive early the next morning. She shouted, "Keep shooting, vultures!" toward photographers who, aware of the death, stood behind the gate that blocked them from Monroe’s driveway. Following this outburst, she was fired by her boss, Arthur P. Jacobs, and attended Monroe's funeral on August 8.

Throughout the years, Newcomb's work for the Kennedys and silence on Monroe's death have led to conspiracy theories regarding her involvement in a possible murder scenario, outlined in Monroe biographies such as Did Pat Newcomb kill Marilyn Monroe? She has given rare statements to several writers, but has mostly declined to comment on her former client. Newcomb remains one of the last people alive who were closely linked to Monroe.

== Personal life ==
On June 28, 1982, Newcomb married film producer Gareth Wigan, who died in 2010. They had no children together.
