= Robert Goldstein (producer) =

American film producer (1903–1974)

Robert Goldstein (28 May 1903 – 6 April 1974) was an American film producer who was briefly head of production at 20th Century Fox.

== Biography ==
Goldstein was born in Bisbee Arizona but grew up in Los Angeles and attended Santa Monica High School. He started as a vaudeville producer in 1925 in Los Angeles then worked on Broadway.

Goldstein entered the film industry in 1940. He was a producer for Universal‐International and Warner Brothers.

In the 1950s he was a vice president of Leonetti Goldstein Productions, headed by his twin brother, who died in 1954.

In June 1956 became head of production for 20th Century Fox in Europe.

== Studio head ==
After the death of Buddy Adler in 1960 Goldstein was appointed studio production chief in July although on a "temporary basis". He was only in the job for a year then was replaced by Peter Levathes in June 1961. Goldstein returned to London to resume his former job. Hedda Hopper wrote "he'll be lucky to be out of it as he never wanted to leave London in the first place" and called Goldstein "a fine, able man."

Goldstein's tenure as head of the studio included the initial filming of Cleopatra in London, which wound up being abandoned. Films greenlit included Satan Never Sleeps, Lisa' Madison Avenue, Swinging Along and Lion of Sparta.

He died in London.

== Select filmography ==
=== Leonard Goldstein/Robert Goldstein Productions ===
- Black Tuesday (1954)
- Stranger on Horseback (1955)
- Robbers' Roost (1955)
- The Brass Legend (1956) - executive producer
- Dance with Me Henry (1956)
- Crime of Passion (1957) - executive producer
- Fury at Showdown (1957)

=== Select films supervised as head of Fox London ===
- Sea Wife (1957)
- Count Five and Die (1957)
- Heaven Knows, Mr Allison (1957)
- Island in the Sun (1957)
- The Inn of the Sixth Happiness (1958)
- The Sheriff of Fractured Jaw (1958)
- Harry Black (1958)
- Sons and Lovers (1960)
- Oscar Wilde (1960)

=== Films producer/greenlit as head of Fox ===
(* means Europe production)

- The Millionairess (Oct 1960)*
- North to Alaska (Nov 1960)
- Circle of Deception (Nov 1960)*
- The Wizard of Baghdad (Dec 1960)*
- Esther and the King (Dec 1960)*
- Flaming Star (Dec 1960)
- The Marriage-Go-Round (Jan 1961)
- Swinging Along (Feb 1962) aka The Schnook
- Sniper's Ridge (Feb 1961)
- The Mark (Jan 1961)*
- The Fiercest Heart (Mar 1961) aka Journey to Death
- All Hands on Deck (Mar 1961)
- Sanctuary (Apr 1961)
- Snow White and the Three Stooges (May 1961)
- The Big Show (Jul 1961)*
- The Big Gamble (July 1961)*
- Return to Peyton Place (May 1961)
- The Right Approach (May 1961) aka Live Wire
- Misty (Jun 1961)
- Wild in the Country (Jun 1961)
- Voyage to the Bottom of the Sea (July 1961)
- Francis of Assisi (Jul 1961)
- Marines, Let's Go (Aug 1961)
- The Hustler (Sept 1961)
- Pirates of Tortuga (Oct 1961)
- The Queen's Guards (Oct 1961)*
- The Comancheros (Nov 1961)
- The Innocents (Nov 1961)*
- Madison Avenue (Jan 1962)
- Bachelor Flat (Jan 1962)
- Womanhunt (Jan 1962)
- Satan Never Sleeps (Mar 1962)
- State Fair (Mar 1962)
- The Broken Land (Apr 1962)
- Lisa (May 1962) aka The Inspector*
- It Happened in Athens (Jun 1962) aka Winged Victory in Athens
- Hemingway's Adventures of a Young Man (Jul 1962)
- The 300 Spartans (Aug 1962) aka Lions of Sparta
- Gigot (Nov 1962)
- Cleopatra (Jun 1963) - British section filmed under Goldstein
- Something's Got to Give (unfinished)

=== Later films ===
- The Frozen Dead (1966) - executive producer
- It! (1967) - executive producer
- The Good Guys and the Bad Guys (1969) - executive producer
- Once You Kiss a Stranger... (1969) - executive producer
