= Marilyn (1963 film) =

- Directed by: Harold Medford
- Starring: Marilyn Monroe (archive footage)
- Narrated by: Rock Hudson
- Production company: 20th Century Fox
- Distributed by: 20th Century Fox
- Release dates: April 18, 1963 (United States); July 19, 1963 (West Germany)
- Running time: 83 minutes
- Country: United States
- Language: English

Marilyn is a 1963 documentary film based on the life of the 1950s to early 1960s actress and sex symbol Marilyn Monroe. Released by 20th Century Fox, the documentary was directed by Harold Medford and was narrated by Rock Hudson.

== Background ==
In 1947, Marilyn Monroe had originally signed with Twentieth Century-Fox, where she played bit parts in a few films, starring actors like Betty Grable, June Haver, Cary Grant, Peggy Cummins, and Jeanne Crain. She was released from her contract where she appeared in minor roles in films like Love Happy (1949), starring The Marx Brothers. She re-signed with Fox in 1950 and appeared in supporting roles such as All About Eve, starring Bette Davis. After several films, Monroe found her breakout role in Niagara (1953), which also featured Joseph Cotten and Jean Peters. Monroe starred in several successful films, including Gentlemen Prefer Blondes (1953), How to Marry a Millionaire (1953), and River of No Return (1954).

Monroe's first film to not meet expectations was There's No Business Like Show Business (1954), a musical, co-starring Ethel Merman, Dan Dailey, Donald O'Connor, Mitzi Gaynor, and Johnnie Ray. However, Monroe re-gained her success with The Seven Year Itch (1955), co-starring Tom Ewell and Evelyn Keyes. The Seven Year Itch showcased the famous scene of Monroe's white dress being flown in the breeze by a subway grating. This film was a major success, as was Monroe's next feature, Bus Stop (1956), which was her last film with Fox until 1960. However, Monroe's most commercially successfully film was 1959's Some Like It Hot, a comedy co-starring Tony Curtis and Jack Lemmon.

However, Marilyn only focuses on the films that Monroe made with 20th Century Fox, which excludes Some Like It Hot, as it was released by United Artists. Monroe's last film with Fox was the 1960 romantic-musical comedy Let's Make Love, also starring Yves Montand. In 1962, she returned to complete her contract with Fox with a remake of the 1940 film My Favorite Wife titled Something's Got to Give. Monroe was cast in the lead alongside Dean Martin, Cyd Charisse, Wally Cox, and Phil Silvers. However, Monroe died before the film's completion. In 1963, Fox revamped the project into Move Over, Darling with Doris Day, James Garner, and Polly Bergen.

== Release ==
To date, Marilyn has not been released on either DVD or VHS.

== Reception ==
Larry Tubelle of Variety wrote "...although this documentary is neither penetrating nor thorough (only her films for 20th are covered), it is engrossing and affecting, and has the curiosity value to attract those picturegoers whose imaginations have been captured by the complex personality who reigned as the glamour queen of the screen for almost a decade."

A. H. Weiler of The New York Times similarly wrote the documentary "shows no effort to delve into the essentials that gave her that rare attribute 'star quality,' on which Rock Hudson, seen as the narrator, comments. But nostalgic fans will be admirably served by these excerpts from 15 features dating back to the 1950 Ticket to Tomahawk and ending with last year's Something's Got to Give, which was uncompleted at her death."
