= Eunice Murray Blackmer =

American housekeeper and writer (1902–1994)

- Born: Eunice Marjorie Joerndt; March 3, 1902; Chicago, Illinois, United States
- Died: March 5, 1994 (aged 92); Tucson, Arizona, United States
- Other names: Eunice Blackmer; Eunice Murray
- Occupations: Writer; housekeeper; nurse
- Years active: 1961–1962
- Spouse(s): John Maer Murray (m. 1923; div. 1950) Franklin Henry Blackmer (m. 1972; died 1977)
- Children: 3

Eunice Murray Blackmer (née Joerndt) (March 3, 1902 – March 5, 1994) was the housekeeper and assistant of actress Marilyn Monroe. She was the key witness to the events surrounding Monroe's death in August 1962, officially ruled a probable suicide.

== Early life ==
Eunice Murray was born Eunice Marjorie Joerndt in Chicago, Illinois, on March 3, 1902 to William Karl Henry Joerndt and Mary Miller. She had several siblings, including a sister named Carolyn. She was married to John Murray in 1924. They had three daughters: Patricia, Jacqueline and Marilyn. The marriage ended in divorce in 1950.

== Career ==
Before working for Monroe, little was publicly documented about Murray's career. It is believed she was trained as a psychiatric nurse. She worked with a Santa Monica, California-based psychoanalyst, Dr. Ralph Greenson, as a support worker for his clients. On Greenson's recommendation, Monroe hired Murray in November 1961. Murray served as Monroe's assistant and housekeeper at her home in Brentwood, Los Angeles. Murray lived nearby but occasionally stayed over in Monroe's house.

Murray accompanied Monroe on what would be her last trip to Mexico, as her personal assistant, on a publicity tour between 20 February and 3 March 1962, along with Monroe's hair stylist George Masters and her press officer Pat Newcomb.

In May 1962, Monroe became concerned that Murray had been appointed by Greenson to supervise her and briefly released Murray before re-hiring her.

== Marilyn Monroe's death ==
Being present from the discovery of Monroe's body until its removal by the authorities makes Murray the principal witness to her death. Although the testimonies she related to biographers and historians are largely consistent, some inconsistencies have contributed to speculation that either Monroe's death was a homicide or its circumstances were tampered with to protect Monroe's political associates.

While the precise details and timing of the events leading up to and following Monroe's death have been disputed, it can be established that Murray spent the nights of Friday, August 3, 1962 and Saturday, August 4, 1962 with Monroe at her home and discovered Monroe dead in the early hours of Sunday morning, August 5, 1962.

By Murray's testimony, at around 3:00 a.m. on Sunday, August 5, several hours after Monroe had retired to bed, she noticed Monroe's bedroom light was still on and, believing her to be awake, knocked her door to offer assistance. Receiving no response, she telephoned Greenson, who suggested she perform a welfare check and go outside to look through Monroe's bedroom window. Murray did so, and seeing Monroe nude and unmoving, felt enough concern to summon Greenson to the house at 3:35am. Upon arrival, Greenson broke the window to enter the room and found Monroe dead, clutching a telephone receiver in her right hand. Greenson alerted Monroe's personal physician, Dr. Hyman Engelberg, who arrived and pronounced her dead. At 4:25am, they contacted the Los Angeles Police Department. This apparent delay in contacting emergency services along with conflicting timelines provided in the recollections of Murray and members of the police and paramedic services who attended the scene have fed speculation that Monroe's death was suspicious and that Greenson and Murray may have been participants in a cover-up.

During interviews for a 1985 BBC documentary, Say Goodbye to the President, the first police officer to arrive on the scene, Sergeant Jack Clemmons, recalled speaking with Murray, Greenson and Engleberg at the time. He says they told him a different story to the one Murray would later maintain: that she had in fact found Monroe dead four hours earlier, shortly after midnight. Clemmons remembered that when he challenged them all as to why they had taken four and a half hours to involve the police he received no satisfactory explanation. Clemmons also claimed he found Murray washing Monroe's bedsheets when he and other officers arrived, positioning this as Murray effectively destroying crime scene evidence. If true, Clemmons should have regarded these as indicators of foul play and would have been professionally obligated to mention them in the police reports he filed immediately after leaving Monroe's home to prompt further investigation and questioning of Murray, Greenson and Engelberg. However, nothing in his reports reflects or indicates these concerns.

In the same documentary, Walter Shaeffer, founder of the Schaefer Ambulance Service serving Southern California, recalled that his services were called to Monroe's house shortly after 12:00am where they found her alive but unconscious from a drug overdose. He maintains she died during transport or shortly after arrival at UCLA Santa Monica Medical Center. In response to this, in her interview for the same BBC crew, Murray changed her story that she had indeed become concerned around midnight, and summoned a doctor who examined Monroe while she was still alive. For the first time, she said Bobby Kennedy was at Monroe's house on the afternoon of her death, leaving Monroe upset, and that his aides instructed the delay after Monroe was found dead in order to allow Kennedy to leave the area. Murray later recanted this as her own confusion.

Considering that Murray was in her 80s when she was interviewed, it is reasonable to allow the details of her testimony may reflect age-related memory loss, rather than indications of involvement in illicit activity. In her 2004 study, The Many Lives of Marilyn Monroe, Sarah Churchwell concludes the inconsistencies are the combined results of fallible memories, celebrity gossip, ineffective information gathering and politically-motivated distortions.

In 1982, the Los Angeles County District Attorney's office reviewed the death of Marilyn Monroe and found no evidence to support a suggestion of foul play, though noted 'factual discrepancies' in the original investigation.

== Later life ==
Sometime after 1972, Eunice Murray married her brother-in-law Rev. Franklin Henry Blackmer, following the death of her sister Carolyn Blackmer (née Joerndt).

Murray co-authored a book with Rose Shade, entitled Marilyn: The Last Months, published in 1975, that detailed her year living with the star. She appeared in several documentaries about Monroe's life and death. She was never formally interviewed by police as a suspect.

== Death ==
Eunice Murray lived in an apartment in Santa Monica, California in 1983 when BBC documentary director Christopher Olgiati and his crew interviewed her for The Last Days of Marilyn Monroe, also known as Marilyn: Say Goodbye to the President.

Later in life, Murray lived with one of her daughters in Tucson, Arizona. Murray died there on March 5, 1994, at the age of 92.

== Filmography ==
=== Television series ===
Year	Title	Role	Notes
1966	ABC Stage 67	Herself	Episode: The Legend of Marilyn Monroe
1973	60 Minutes	Herself	Episode: Monroe, Mailer, and the Fast Buck/Whatever Happened to the Suez Canal?/What Makes Bobby Run?/Billie Jean
1979	Hollywood Greats	Herself	Episode: Marilyn Monroe
1981	In Search of...	Herself	Episode: The Death of Marilyn Monroe
2000	The Final Day	Herself	Episode: Marilyn Monroe
2022	Cold Case Geschichte	Herself	Posthumous release

=== Film ===
Year	Title	Role	Notes
1966	The Legend of Marilyn Monroe	Herself	Documentary film
1985	Say Goodbye to the President	Herself	Documentary film
2001	Marilyn Monroe: The Final Days	Herself	Posthumous release
2018	Haunted Houses of Hollywood	Herself	Posthumous release
2022	Fatal Addiction: Marilyn Monroe	Herself	Posthumous release
