= Something's Got to Give =

1962 unfinished film

- UK VHS cover
- Directed by: George Cukor
- Screenplay by: Nunnally Johnson; Walter Bernstein
- Based on: My Favorite Wife by Bella Spewack; Samuel Spewack; Leo McCarey
- Produced by: Henry T. Weinstein
- Starring: Marilyn Monroe; Dean Martin; Cyd Charisse; Tom Tryon; Phil Silvers
- Cinematography: Franz Planer; Leo Tover
- Edited by: Tori Rodman
- Music by: Johnny Mercer
- Distributed by: 20th Century Fox
- Running time: 37 minutes
- Country: United States
- Language: English

Something's Got to Give is an unfinished American feature film shot in 1962, directed by George Cukor for 20th Century Fox and starring Marilyn Monroe, Dean Martin and Cyd Charisse. A remake of My Favorite Wife (1940), a screwball comedy starring Irene Dunne and Cary Grant, it was Monroe's last work.

Principal photography began on April 23, 1962, without Monroe present on set, who had said she suffered from bouts of illness. Monroe did arrive on set to film several scenes on select days in May 1962 before she left to sing "Happy Birthday, Mr. President" to U.S. President John F. Kennedy at his birthday celebration in Madison Square Garden. She returned to Hollywood to film her naked swimming sequence, where she donned a flesh-colored bikini to appear nude. Monroe suggested being photographed in the nude, in which several photographers were invited to take pictures of her. Monroe's last full day of filming was on Friday, June 1, her 36th birthday. Afterwards, Monroe was unavailable on Monday, June 4, due to severe illness.

Frustrated by the frequent delays, and with production weeks behind schedule, 20th Century Fox fired Monroe on June 8, and sued her and her production company for US$750,000. She was replaced by Lee Remick; however, Dean Martin, Monroe's co-star, refused to return without Monroe, and the film was indefinitely suspended. Monroe's representatives entered negotiations with Fox to withdraw the lawsuit and have production resume with Monroe, but this was not possible after Monroe was found dead at her Brentwood residence on August 5, 1962. Most completed footage remained unseen for several decades.

A year later, 20th Century Fox overhauled the entire production, which was retitled Move Over, Darling (1963) and starred Doris Day, James Garner, and Polly Bergen.

== Plot ==
Ellen Arden, a photographer and mother of two small children, has been declared legally dead, having been lost at sea in the Pacific. Her husband Nick has remarried; he and his new wife, Bianca, are on their honeymoon when Ellen, rescued from an island where she has been stranded for five years, returns home. The family dog remembers her, but the children do not. However, they take a liking to her, and invite her to stay. Ellen assumes a foreign accent and pretends to be a woman named Ingrid Tic.

Nick, flustered by the revelation that he is now married to two women, makes great effort to keep the truth from his new wife all the while trying to quash her amorous advances. Upon learning that Ellen was marooned on the island with a man, Stephen Burkett, whom she knew as "Adam" to her "Eve"—he becomes jealous and suspicious of her fidelity. To calm his fears, Ellen enlists a meek shoe salesman to impersonate her island companion.

== Cast ==
- Marilyn Monroe as Ellen Wagstaff Arden
- Dean Martin as Nicholas Arden
- Cyd Charisse as Bianca Russell Arden
- Tom Tryon as Stephen Burkett
- Wally Cox as shoe salesman
- Phil Silvers as insurance salesman
- Steve Allen as psychiatrist
- John McGiver as judge
- Robert Christopher Morley as Timmy Arden
- Alexandria Heilweil as Lita Arden

== Pre-production ==
=== Monroe health problems ===
By the middle of 1962, Marilyn Monroe had not appeared in a film project since The Misfits, released in February 1961, and instead focused on her health. She had surgery for her endometriosis and gallbladder problems, and underwent four weeks of hospital treatment for depression. She first admitted herself to the Payne Whitney Psychiatric Clinic, but was erroneously placed on a ward meant for people with psychosis, where she was locked in a padded cell and not allowed to move to a more suitable ward or leave the hospital. After three days, Monroe was moved into the Columbia University Medical Center with the help of her ex-husband Joe DiMaggio, with whom she rekindled a friendship.

=== Goodbye Charlie ===
By January 1961, Monroe had one film left on her four-picture contract with Twentieth Century-Fox. Monroe was offered the title role in Goodbye Charlie (1964) based on the 1959 play by George Axelrod. In the play, the male character Charlie Sorrel is shot by a jealous husband, falls out of the ship's porthole, becomes lost at sea, and is reincarnated as a blonde woman. Monroe was unimpressed with the offer, stating: "The studio people want me to do Goodbye Charlie. But I'm not going to do it. I don't like the idea of playing a man in a woman's body, you know? It just doesn't seem feminine."

That same month, James Garner was offered the leading role opposite of Monroe. Monroe's choice of director was George Cukor, who had previously directed her in Let's Make Love (1960). However, Cukor was unavailable as he had intended to direct Lady L (1965) at Metro-Goldwyn-Mayer (MGM). According to The New York Times, the production was plagued by internal problems including cost overruns, with nearly $2.7 million spent, and Cukor's dissatisfaction with Robert Anderson's script. Tony Curtis and Gina Lollobrigida were set to star, while the script was rewritten by S. N. Behrman and later Noel Langley. However, in April 1961, Cukor delivered an interoffice memo to MGM production head Sol C. Siegel, stating he had vehemently disliked the latest draft due to "its lack of style and wit". Rather than proceed with filming Lady L the next week, Cukor asked to be relieved from the project.

Meanwhile, Monroe had been notified to arrive on set for Goodbye Charlie on April 14, 1961. However, Monroe informed Twentieth Century-Fox that she would not appear in the film. When Cukor was unavailable as well, the studio filed a breach of contract lawsuit, with MGM and Twentieth Century-Fox entangled in a legal battle over Cukor's availability. Fox filed an injunction for Cukor to have him complete their film first, while MGM argued their contract with Cukor gave them the right of pre-emption. Cukor's attorneys settled with MGM for an undisclosed settlement. Evidently, Lady L was cancelled and was revamped into a 1965 film directed by Peter Ustinov. To settle his lawsuit with Fox, Cukor accepted the assignment to direct The Chapman Report (1962). However, Spyros Skouras, then-president of Twentieth Century-Fox, refused to move The Chapman Report into production. Instead, the film was moved to Warner Bros. with Richard and Darryl F. Zanuck as the producers. A share of the box office profits were transferred to Twentieth Century-Fox.

By May 1961, Goodbye Charlie had been placed indefinitely on hold after nearly a year in development and two months after filming was meant to commence. Skouras consulted with Monroe's attorneys and decided not to sue the actress. He released her from her obligation to film Goodbye, Charlie and permitted her to appear in a NBC teleplay titled Rain, with the stipulation she finish by October 30. Her attorneys upheld that Monroe owed Fox one more film, with a new production start date set on November 15. After a five-month pause, Fox studio executives began drafting letters to Monroe's independent company, Marilyn Monroe Productions (MMP) reminding her of her contractual obligation and suggesting she star in a project titled Something's Got to Give. On September 26, MMP finally responded to Fox's proposal, and within three weeks, on October 16, Monroe accepted the project and a new contract was signed. A start date set on November 15, 1961 was approved.

=== Something's Got to Give pre-production ===
Something's Got to Give was intended as a remake of My Favorite Wife (1940), directed by Leo McCarey and starring Cary Grant and Irene Dunne, which itself was adapted from the 1864 poem "Enoch Arden" by Alfred, Lord Tennyson. David Brown, who had previously worked as a story editor and executive vice president for Fox, was set to produce. Frank Tashlin was hired to direct a screenplay written by Edmund Hartmann. Tashlin made his own script revisions although it was not written with Monroe in mind (instead, it was intended for Jayne Mansfield). In October 1961, Twentieth Century-Fox announced that Monroe would instead be directed by George Cukor in Something's Got to Give. At Cukor's suggestion, Arnold Schulman was hired to rewrite the script for Monroe. The studio promised to send Monroe a copy of the script as soon it was approved, but reminded Monroe's attorney Mickey Rudin that she did not have script approval. Later on, Schulman quit the film in protest when he learned of the studio's mistreatment of Monroe.

In November 1961, Variety reported that filming for Something's Got to Give had been pushed back to January 5, 1962. The reasons were that Cukor was still filming The Chapman Report and was expected to finish on December 18, 1961. By this point, several screenwriters had worked on the script, but their drafts were turned down at Monroe's insistence. In January 1962, Nunnally Johnson, the sixth employed screenwriter, was contacted to write the final shooting script. Johnson had previously written for Monroe with How to Marry a Millionaire (1953). Johnson recalled, "The job came out of the blue. I happened to be in New York in January, and they [Fox] were getting desperate. They asked me to try my hand on a rush job." Johnson delivered his draft of the script on March 29, 1962 with a new production date set for April 16. The production budget was approved at $3.25 million with a 47-day filming schedule.

However, Cukor disliked Johnson's script as it was too different from My Favorite Wife. On the other hand, Monroe had liked the updated, modernized script as it was written exclusively for her. Regardless, Cukor hired Walter Bernstein to make extensive rewrites of Johnson's script. Before he rewrote the script, Bernstein rewatched My Favorite Wife and wondered why Johnson had worked so hard to change a "perfect film." Cukor agreed and was in favor of restoring as much as the old movie [script] as possible, on the theory that no one had yet managed to improve on it, and in any case, there was no time to try." During filming, as Bernstein rewrote the script, Monroe was given different-colored pages of the script revisions during the evening to memorize for the next day.

Meanwhile, Cukor's longtime collaborators, production designer Gene Allen and photographer George Hoyningen-Huene, designed an exact replica of the exterior of Cukor's house and swimming pool area, which was built on the Twentieth Century-Fox backlot.

== Casting ==
As the co-star opposite to Marilyn Monroe, James Garner had been the original choice but he turned down the role. At the time, Garner had agreed to appear in The Great Escape (1963), which was to begin filming in Munich in June 1962. The Mirisch Company had feared Monroe's reputation for tardiness would prolong production and would make Garner unavailable for The Great Escape. In December 1961, Rock Hudson had been offered the part but he too was unavailable. Steve Forrest was approached, but Monroe did not agree on his casting. Stuart Whitman was also mentioned and Robert Goulet was unavailable as he was performing in the Broadway musical Camelot. Jack Lemmon and John Gavin were floated as potential candidates, but Monroe would not agree. By late March 1962, Dean Martin was cast opposite in the role. Martin stipulated he had final approval of his leading lady, and should Monroe be replaced, he would either approve the replacement or else not complete the film.

In mid-January 1962, Gardner McKay, the lead actor of the TV series Adventures in Paradise, was approached for the role of Stephen Burkett, having been mentioned by Monroe. The actor received a phone call from Cukor, offering him the role, but McKay turned it down. Monroe personally phoned McKay, suggesting he change his mind. Decades later, McKay told Vanity Fair: "She was so delightful on the phone, so winning, so seductive in a way," but he turned her down. He added: "I didn't belong in acting."

Cyd Charisse was hired to portray the character Bianca. Tom Tryon, the lead actor for the TV series Texas John Slaughter, was cast in the role of Stephen Burkett. By late April 1962, Steve Allen had signed on, after Jack Benny and George Gobel had turned down the part due to scheduling conflicts. Wally Cox, a friend of Monroe's, was cast in the role of a shoe salesman.

== Production ==
At the start of production, Twentieth Century-Fox was still in a period of financial disarray that had begun with the resignation of Darryl F. Zanuck in 1956. The studio had sold off its expansive backlot, which became Century City. Buddy Adler, the studio's head of production, had died in 1960 and was replaced by Peter Levathes. Meanwhile, Cleopatra (1963) was being filmed overseas in Rome and running millions over budget. Something's Got to Give was the only production on the studio backlot. Sometime later, Levathes fired David Brown as the producer, and replaced him with Henry Weinstein.

Days before filming began, Monroe telephoned Weinstein to inform him that she had a severe sinus infection and would not arrive on the set that morning. Twentieth Century-Fox sent staff physician Dr. Lee Siegel to examine Monroe at her Beverly Hills residence. The studio was advised to postpone the production, but the advice was not heeded. Filming proceeded on schedule that same day, April 23, 1962. Monroe was too ill to work for the majority of the first two weeks of filming. Nevertheless, Monroe was present on set on April 30. She returned to work on May 14 to film the scene where her character returns home. There, she lingers by the swimming pool and reunites with her children. Monroe shot additional scenes for the next two days. Despite confirmations by multiple doctors, Fox tried to pressure her by publicly alleging that she was faking her symptoms.

By the end of the third week, Levathes had learned Monroe had accepted an invitation to appear at U.S. President John F. Kennedy's birthday celebration at Madison Square Garden on May 19, ten days before the actual date (May 29). Monroe had been given permission to appear, but Levathes reversed his stance because of Monroe's frequent absences. He then promptly told Monroe's attorney Mickey Rudin he could not let her leave as she was expected to be on set from May 14 to 18. The studio threatened to sue Monroe if she left for New York, but U.S. Attorney General Robert F. Kennedy intervened to halt any litigation. Regardless, Monroe flew out to New York on May 17. This caused a great amount of publicity for Monroe, but also significant speculation about an extramarital affair with the president and concerns from government agents.

=== Pool scene ===
Monroe returned to Los Angeles on May 20 to resume production on Something's Got to Give. She had lost fifteen pounds due to a high-protein, low-starch diet ever since her gallbladder surgery a year earlier. According to photographer Lawrence Schiller, Monroe told her publicist Patricia Newcomb she had wanted to "knock Elizabeth Taylor off the front of every magazine cover." They devised the idea for her to be featured nude during the pool scene. In the film, Monroe (as Ellen) attempts to entice her husband Nick (Martin) away from the bed he was sharing with his new wife, Bianca (Charisse). Ellen then skinny dips into a swimming pool and emerges from the pool, naked while Nick watches from above, from his bedroom window.

The decision to film the pool scene was approved, on the condition that Monroe requested that the set be cleared of everyone except the essential personnel. On Wednesday, May 23, at Stage 14 on the Twentieth Century-Fox backlot, security was held tight on the set. Cukor had cleared the set of hangers-on and asked the electricians to look away as filming proceeded. Clutching the edge of the pool, Monroe concentrated more on her limited swimming strokes than her figure. She told Cukor, "All I can do is dog paddle." Cukor replied, "That will be just fine, darling."

From 9 am to 4 pm, but with a twenty-minute lunch break, Monroe stayed in the pool while several camera angles were filming her paddling, splashing, and waving. Monroe performed the scene in a two-part, flesh-colored bikini bottom, though the film's cinematographer William Daniels noticed the back strap of her bikini top was clearly visible to the camera's lenses. Daniels alerted Cukor, who then asked Monroe to perform it for real. Monroe was wise to his scheme, but willingly tossed aside her bikini top for a quick rear-side angle shot.

Monroe then suggested being photographed in the nude as she wraps herself in a blue terrycloth robe. Although the suggested shots were not in the script, and were unlikely to receive approval from the Motion Production Code, Cukor realized the shots would be beneficial to the film's publicity campaign. Two freelance photographers, William Woodfield and Lawrence Schiller, and James Mitchell, Fox's official studio photographer, were allowed on set to photograph Monroe. Once filming had wrapped, Monroe returned to the pool and playfully posed around the edge. As the photographs were being taken, Monroe emerged from the pool and was nude, having removed her flesh-colored bikini yet again. At length, the images appeared on more than 70 magazine covers in 32 countries.

Had Something's Got to Give been completed and released as planned, Monroe would have been the first mainstream star shown topless in a Hollywood motion picture release of the sound era. Instead, that distinction goes to actress Jayne Mansfield in Promises! Promises! (1963).

=== Monroe's last day on the set ===
On Friday, June 1, 1962, Monroe had planned to celebrate her 36th birthday on set. However, Cukor insisted that they wait until the end of the working day because he wanted to get a "full day's work out of her." On set, she, Martin and Wally Cox filmed a scene in the courtyard set, where Ellen tries to convince Nick that Cox's character was her island partner. At 6:00 pm, Monroe's stand-in and close friend, Evelyn Moriarty, wheeled out a seven-dollar sheet cake that had been purchased that morning at the Los Angeles Farmers Market. Seven Fourth of July sparkles and a bikini-clad miniature doll adorned atop the cake. As the traditional birthday song was sung, Cox and Monroe's personal makeup artist Allan "Whitey" Snyder poured champagne for those on set. Monroe was given a hand-drawn birthday card, signed by the cast and crew. Inside, there was a cartoon drawing of Monroe in the nude holding a towel, which read "Happy Birthday (Suit)" in reference to her nude pool sequence.

A half-hour had passed, and everyone had left the party. Monroe next left the party with Cox in a limousine, wearing a cashmere suit and mink hat she had worn while filming that day. Her former husband Joe DiMaggio was out of the United States at the time. Nevertheless, Monroe left to attend a fundraising baseball game for muscular dystrophy at Dodger Stadium that evening. Martin's youngest son Dino accompanied them, and Joe DiMaggio Jr. was Monroe's escort as they arrived at the Dodgers Stadium. After the game, Monroe dined at the Chasen's restaurant and then the Italian gourmet restaurant La Scala, before returning home at 12:30 am.

=== Firing of Monroe ===
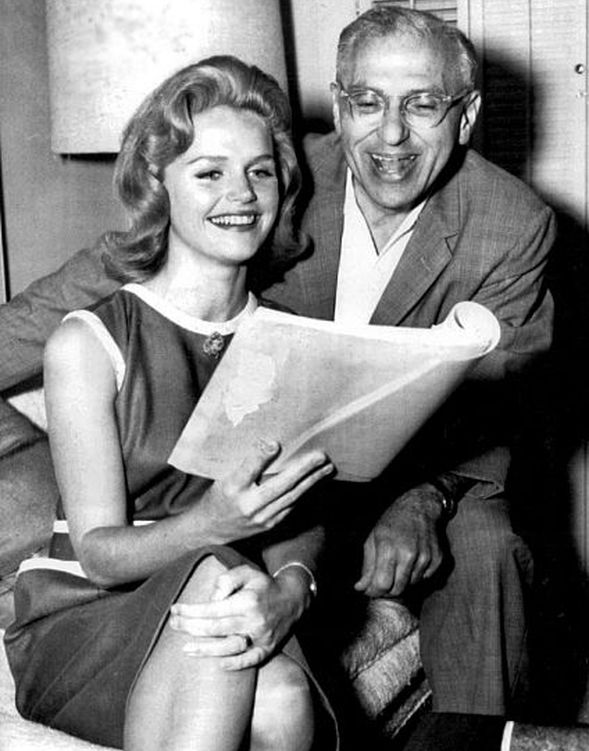
Lee Remick and director George Cukor

On Sunday, June 3, 1962, Monroe was found in a depressed state, having consumed several Nembutal prescription pills, by her psychiatrist Ralph Greenson's son and daughter, Dan and Joan. Since Greeson was out of the United States, his children followed their father's instructions and contacted Milton Wexler, who then confiscated Monroe's cabinet of prescription pills. Another doctor Milton Uhley was called in to administer a sedation.

On Monday, June 4, 1962, Monroe's acting coach Paula Strasberg phoned the studio to inform that Monroe would not be on set that day once again. Milton Rudin arrived at Monroe's residence and pleaded for Monroe to return to work. A heated argument ensued, in which Monroe accused him of taking Fox's side. Weinstein phoned Monroe and told her he was willing to escort her to the studio, but Monroe refused.

That same day, Cukor filmed a scene with Charisse and Martin. Afterwards, he dismissed the production crew, letting it be known that if Monroe failed to arrive the next day, he had nothing left to film. A call was issued for Tuesday, June 5. If Monroe did not arrive on set, the studio had two options: hire a replacement or shut down the production. Kim Novak, Shirley MacLaine, Doris Day, and Lee Remick were among the several actresses suggested as a replacement. One day later, studio doctor Lee Siegel was dispatched to Monroe's residence, where the actress had a flare-up of the sinusitis, and her temperature had reached 102 °F (38.9 °C).

On June 6, Fox had indicated they were considering a lawsuit against Monroe for failing to appear on set. Weinstein released a statement to the press: "Marilyn has reported only twelve days out of the thirty two she is supposed to have worked. She has completely flouted professional discipline and is responsible for putting 104 crew members out of work. We definitely are going to take some action to protect the picture, our stockholders and the other artists in the cast." In response, Monroe's spokesman replied: "Marilyn isn't being difficult. She's been ill and unable to work."

Two days later, on June 8, Monroe was fired by Levathes and Twentieth Century-Fox, who then filed a $750,000 lawsuit against her and her company, Marilyn Monroe Productions, for allegations of breach of contract. That same day, Lee Remick had been hired to replace Monroe. She was then fitted into Monroe's costumes and was rushed to the studio where she was photographed with Cukor going over the screenplay. Despite Remick's hiring, Dean Martin declared, "I have the greatest respect for Miss Lee Remick and her talent and all the other actresses who were considered for the role, but I signed to do the picture with Marilyn Monroe and I will do it with no one else."

== Subsequent events ==
=== Rehiring of Monroe ===
On Saturday morning, June 9, an emergency meeting was held in which Cukor, Levathes, Phil Feldman, and several others had failed to persuade Dean Martin to continue filming. On June 11, Fox announced it had indefinitely suspended production due to Martin's refusal to continue filming. The next week, on June 18, Fox sued Martin for over $3 million, alleging he had breached his contract by failing to continue the production. Remick was later released from her contract to appear in the film. According to The New York Times, Remick was paid $100,000 (almost $1.07 million in 2025) despite the production not continuing, and traveled to England to begin filming The Running Man (1963) with Laurence Harvey.

On June 25, Martin filed a countersuit for $6 million against Twentieth Century-Fox, charging the studio with "defamation, conspiracy, and breach of contract". Two weeks later, Cyd Charisse filed suit against both Martin and the studio for failing to receive her unpaid salary. A year later, in June 1963, both Martin and the studio withdrew their counter lawsuits. The studio then praised Martin as being the "most cooperative and prompt in the discharge of professional duties."

By late June 1962, Monroe's representatives wrote to the studio suggesting to restart production on July 23. Fox responded with a stern letter, outlining several restrictions for Monroe to follow should production resume. Monroe would have no consultation or approval of her co-stars, director, script, and production personnel. Monroe's acting coach Paula Strasberg and her representatives would not be allowed on set without prior approval. In return, Fox would drop their lawsuit against Monroe.

As the negotiations were later reached that summer, Monroe was offered one million dollars to complete Something's Got to Give and appear in a second film, What a Way to Go! (1964). Meanwhile, Monroe contacted Darryl F. Zanuck in Paris, having heard he was attempting to retake control of the studio. Cukor, who had left the film to begin pre-production on My Fair Lady (1964), was to be replaced by Jean Negulesco. The production would return to Nunnally Johnson's script, which Monroe had liked. On August 1, Monroe signed a new contract with Fox to complete Something's Got to Give for $250,000.

To repair her public image, Monroe gave interviews and photo essays for Life, Cosmopolitan, and Vogue magazines. Her Life magazine interview with Richard Meryman, published on August 3, 1962—just one day before her death—included her reflections on the positive and negative aspects of fame. She said, "Fame is fickle. I now live in my work and in a few relationships with the few people I can really count on. Fame will go by, and so long, I've had you, fame. If it goes by, I've always known it was fickle. So, at least it's something I experienced, but that's not where I live."

=== Death of Monroe ===
On the evening of August 4, 1962, Monroe died at the age of 36 inside her home in Brentwood, Los Angeles, California. Her body was discovered before dawn in her bedroom the following morning, on August 5.

=== Move Over, Darling ===
In March 1963, Variety announced the project, still titled Something's Got to Give, had been revamped with Doris Day and James Garner. Michael Gordon was slated to direct while the screenplay was written by Hal Kanter and Jack Sher. Principal photography was intended to start on May 13. In June 1963, The New York Times reported the script had been "altered to suit" Day's onscreen image by reverting to elements of My Favorite Wife. Polly Bergen was cast as Bianca while Chuck Connors assumed the role of Stephen Burkett, Ellen's island companion. Filming lasted 53 days and the last scene shot was Day trapped inside her open-top convertible during a car wash. Retitled Move Over, Darling, the film was released by 20th Century Fox on Christmas Day, 25 December 1963.

== Reconstruction ==
On April 18, 1963, Fox released the 83-minute documentary Marilyn, narrated by Rock Hudson. The anthology documentary featured excerpts from the fifteen films she had made with Fox. Select scenes from Something's Got to Give with Monroe were also featured, including the sequence where Monroe swims nude in the pool.

In 1990, the hour-long documentary Marilyn: Something's Got to Give, featured extensive excerpts from the footage. A year earlier, six hours of unedited footage and separate soundtracks from the unfinished film were found in a Kansas warehouse. Ken Turner, the co-producer and editor of the documentary, meticulously restored the footage by color-balancing each frame by hand and syncing the soundtracks from one take into another.

The film sequences were later repurposed by Prometheus Entertainment for the documentary Marilyn Monroe: The Final Days, which aired on AMC on June 1, 2001, the 75th anniversary of Monroe's birth. It was also included on VHS and DVD released by Fox for the Marilyn Monroe: The Diamond Collection.

== Sources ==
- Badman, Keith (2012). Marilyn Monroe: The Final Years. New York: St. Martin's Press. ISBN 978-0-312-60714-2.
- Banner, Lois (2012). Marilyn: The Passion and the Paradox. Bloomsbury. ISBN 978-1-4088-3133-5.
- Casillo, Charles (2018). Marilyn Monroe: The Private Life of a Public Icon. New York: St. Martin's Press. ISBN 978-1-250-09686-9.
- Churchwell, Sarah (2004). The Many Lives of Marilyn Monroe. Granta Books. ISBN 978-0-312-42565-4.
- Hoyt, Edwin Palmer (1973) [1965]. Marilyn: The Tragic Venus. Radnor, Pennsylvania: Chilton Book Co. ISBN 0-801-95915-2.
- Kaufman, David (2008). Doris Day: The Untold Story of the Girl Next Door. New York: Virgin Books. ISBN 978-1-905-26430-8.
- Leaming, Barbara (1998). Marilyn Monroe. Three Rivers Press. ISBN 978-0-609-80553-4.
- Levy, Emanuel (1994). George Cukor: Master of Elegance. New York: Morrow. ISBN 978-0-688-11246-2.
- McGilligan, Patrick (1991). George Cukor: A Double Life. New York: St. Martin's Press. ISBN 0-312-05419-X.
- Morgan, Michelle (2007). Marilyn Monroe: Private and Undisclosed. New York: Carroll & Graf Publishers. ISBN 978-0-78671-958-7.
- Rollyson, Carl (2014). Marilyn Monroe Day by Day: A Timeline of People, Places and Events. Rowman and Littlefield. ISBN 978-1-4422-3079-8.
- Schwarz, Ted (2009). Marilyn Revealed: The Ambitious Life of an American Icon. Lanham, Maryland: Taylor Trade Publishing. ISBN 978-1-589-79342-2.
- Spoto, Donald (2001) [1993]. Marilyn Monroe: The Biography. Cooper Square Press. ISBN 978-0-8154-1183-3.
- Solomon, Aubrey (1988). Twentieth Century-Fox: A Corporate and Financial History. Scarecrow Press. ISBN 978-0-8108-4244-1.
- Taraborrelli, J. Randy (2009). The Secret Life of Marilyn Monroe. New York: Grand Central Publishing. ISBN 978-0-446-58082-3.
