= Happy Birthday, Mr. President =

Song sung by Marilyn Monroe in 1962

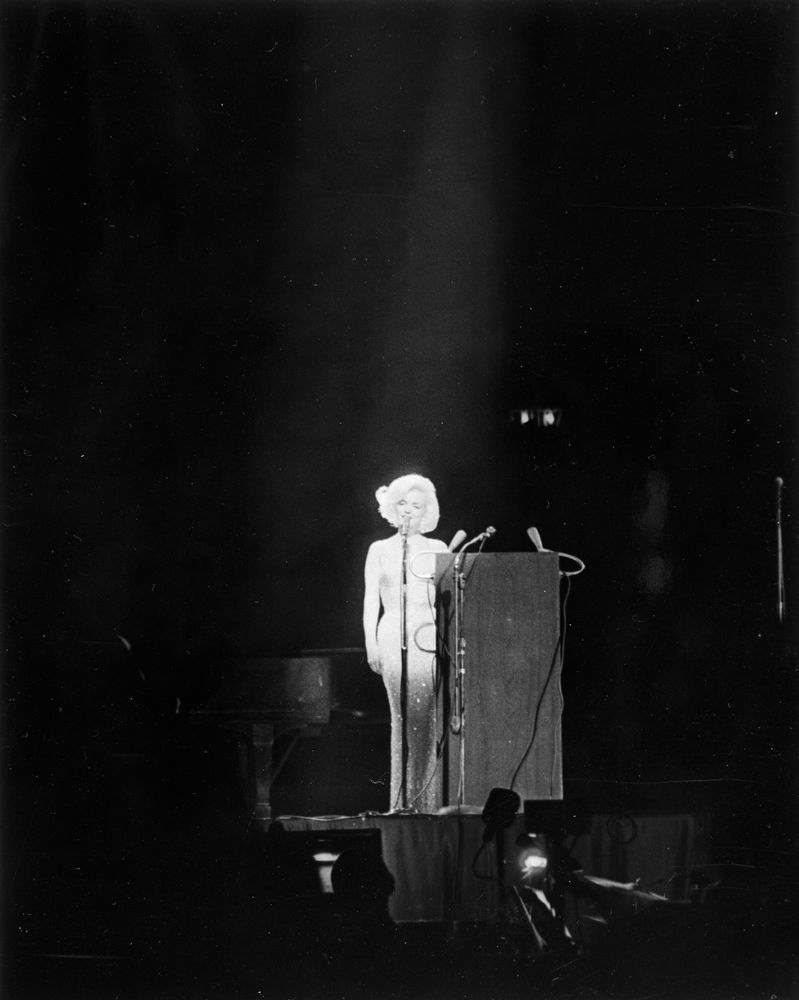
Marilyn Monroe sings to John F. Kennedy during the Madison Square Garden event

"Happy Birthday, Mr. President"
Marilyn Monroe's original performance of the song

"Happy Birthday, Mr. President" is a song sung by actress and singer Marilyn Monroe on May 19, 1962, for President John F. Kennedy at a gala held at third Madison Square Garden for his 45th birthday, 10 days before the actual date (May 29). The event was co-hosted by Arthur B. Krim and Anna M. Rosenberg, who sat next to the President during the star-studded event.

Monroe sang the traditional "Happy Birthday to You" lyrics in a sultry, intimate voice, with "Mr. President" inserted as Kennedy's name. She continued the song with a snippet from the classic 1938 song, "Thanks for the Memory", for which she had written new lyrics specifically aimed at Kennedy.

Thanks, Mr. President
For all the things you've done
The battles that you've won
The way you deal with U.S. Steel
And our problems by the ton
We thank you so much

Afterwards, as a large birthday cake was presented to him, President Kennedy came on stage and joked about Monroe's version of the song, saying, "I can now retire from politics after having had Happy Birthday sung to me in such a sweet, wholesome way," alluding to Monroe's delivery, skintight dress, and image as a sex symbol.

The performance was one of Monroe's last major public appearances before her death less than three months later on August 4, 1962. First Lady Jacqueline Kennedy, who rarely attended Democratic Party events, instead spent the day at the Loudoun Hunt Horse Show with her children, John and Caroline. Monroe was accompanied by jazz pianist Hank Jones.

== History ==
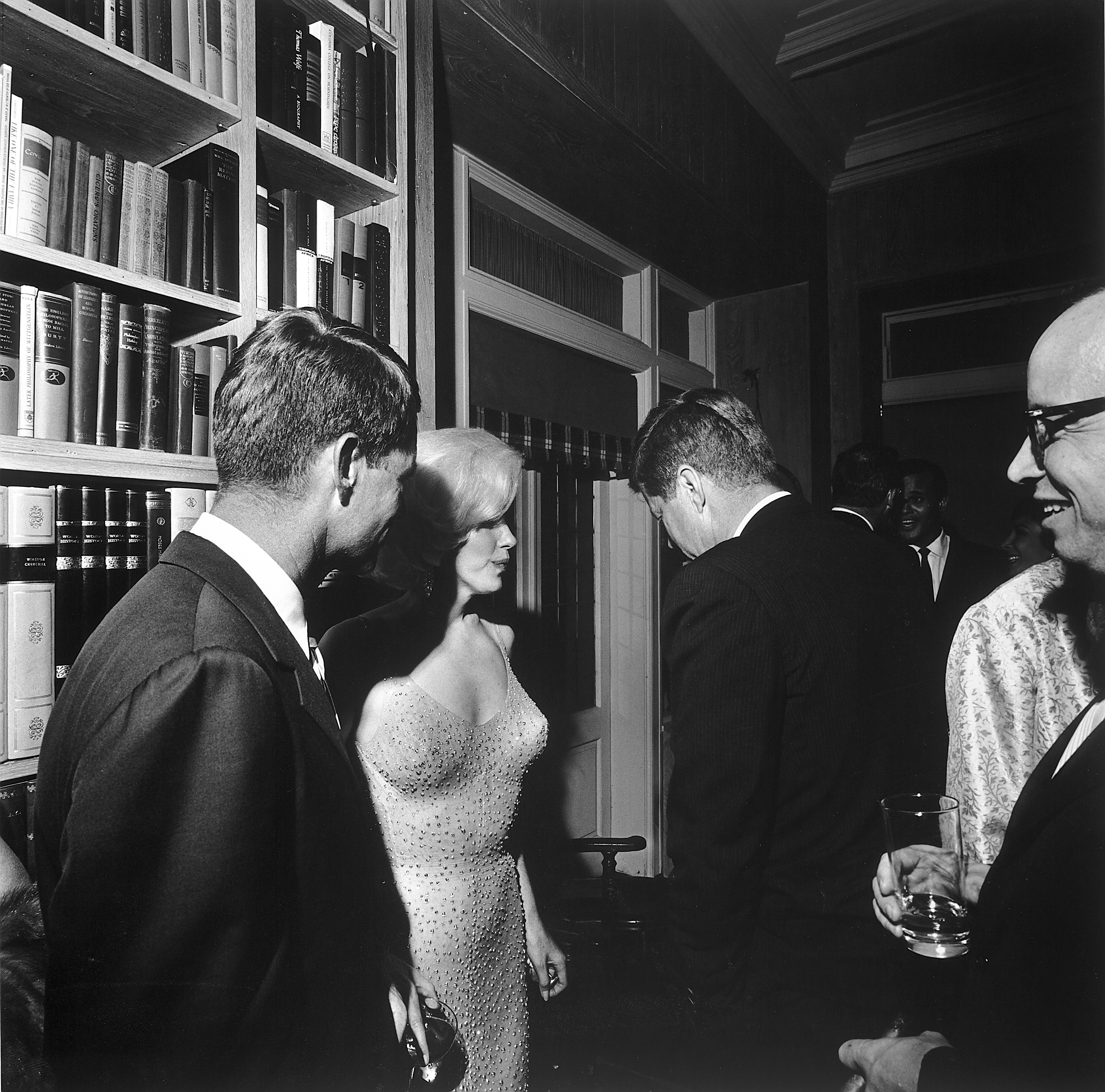
Monroe with U.S. Attorney General Robert F. Kennedy, President John F. Kennedy, and historian Arthur M. Schlesinger Jr. at the birthday celebration

President Kennedy's birthday celebration was held at the third Madison Square Garden on May 19, 1962, and more than 15,000 people attended, including numerous celebrities. The event was a fundraising gala for the Democratic Party.

Monroe attended the event during the production of Something's Got to Give, resulting in her receiving a hand-delivered note stating that she had violated her contract with 20th Century Fox and eventual firing in June 1962.

Monroe's dress was made of a sheer and flesh-colored marquisette fabric, with 2,500 shimmering rhinestones sewn into it. The dress was so tight-fitting that Monroe had difficulty putting it on; she wore nothing under it. It was designed by Jean Louis. Monroe's hair was styled by Kenneth Battelle and her makeup was done by Marie Irvine.

Monroe was accompanied to the event by her publicist Patricia Newcomb and her former father-in-law Isidore Miller, with whom she had remained very close. Peter Lawford was at the event that night to introduce Monroe. He made a play on the actress's reputation for tardiness by giving her a number of introductions throughout the night, after which she did not appear on stage. When Monroe finally appeared in a spotlight, Lawford introduced her as the "late Marilyn Monroe". Monroe peeled off her white ermine fur coat, revealing the dress, and the audience gasped.

The event was staged and produced by Broadway composer and lyricist Richard Adler. The lighting design was by stage designer Sam Leve. According to his New York Times obituary, "Perhaps his most famous, although unintentional, touch was the lighting he designed for Marilyn Monroe's birthday serenade to Kennedy at Madison Square Garden, which caused her dress to become see-through."

== Dress ==
Marilyn Monroe's dress from the event, designed by Jean Louis

Monroe's iconic dress was designed by costume designer Bob Mackie, who was hired to sketch the design for the leading fashion designer of the time, Jean Louis, who paid $1,440.33 (equivalent to $11,721 in 2025) for its construction. The dress sold in 1999 at an auction in New York City for over $1.26 million (equivalent to $2.29 million in 2025). Canadian billionaire Jim Pattison subsequently purchased the dress on November 17, 2016, at a Los Angeles auction for $4.8 million, making it one of the most valuable dresses.

In 2022, reality TV star Kim Kardashian wore Monroe's Happy Birthday Mr. President dress for the Met Gala. Kardashian had lost 16 pounds (7.3 kg) in three weeks to fit into the dress. Kardashian remains the only person other than Monroe known to have worn the dress. Kardashian wore Monroe's original dress for approximately five minutes, only to walk up the runway, and then changed into an exact replica so as to not cause any more unnecessary strain to the 60-year-old dress.

Displeased with both Kardashian and the current owner, Ripley Entertainment, Bob Mackie (who first sketched the design in 1962 at the age of 23) said in an interview with Entertainment Weekly, "I thought it was a big mistake.. [Marilyn] was a goddess. A crazy goddess, but a goddess. She was just fabulous. Nobody photographs like that. And it was done for her. It was designed for her. Nobody else should be seen in that dress."

Within the same interview, Alicia Malone, a host for Turner Classic Movies (TCM), expressed her concerns, stating, "There are all the issues with the actual preservation of the dress and things like oxygen can affect a dress ... Usually, these outfits are kept very much in controlled environments. So, it was quite alarming that she was able to wear it. I personally wish she wore a replica instead of the real thing."

In an interview with BBC in June 2022, Kate Strasdin, a senior lecturer in cultural studies at Falmouth University, remarked, "You can't even handle a dress like that without damaging it in some way, let alone wear it, so it was inevitable that there was going to be significant damage just by even wearing it on the red carpet... there will have been oils in her skin, there will have been all of that chemical reaction with a silk that is fragile". It is also noted that an Instagram account dedicated to "The Marilyn Monroe Collection", a company which claims to hold "the world's largest privately held collection of Marilyn Monroe's personal property," managed by owner Scott Fortner's team, posted a comparison image of the dress which showed significant irreversible damage which occurred after the gala event.

== Legacy ==
In the 1987 season three, sixth episode of The Golden Girls ("Letter to Gorbachev"), Rose Nylund (Betty White) dreams about, among other incidents, Blanche Devereaux (Rue McClanahan) singing a parody rendition titled "Happy Birthday, Mr. #1 Communist" to Mikhail Gorbachev, the then-leader of the Soviet Union.

On the January 16, 1993, episode of Saturday Night Live, musical guest Madonna parodied the song as "Happy Inauguration, Mr. President", alluding to the first inauguration of Bill Clinton later that week.

Geri Halliwell of the Spice Girls performed the song in 1998 for the then Prince Charles' 50th birthday celebration, replacing the line "Happy Birthday, Mr. President" with "Happy Birthday, Your Royal Highness".

In a season two episode of Breaking Bad, "Mandala" (2009), Skyler White sings the song to her boss Ted Beneke for his birthday. Fran Felstein sings it in The Sopranos season 5 episode "In Camelot" (2004).

In 2012, American musician Lana Del Rey reenacted the performance in the music video for her song "National Anthem", with herself as Monroe and ASAP Rocky as President Kennedy.

In 2016, a trailer for the second season of the alternate history series The Man in the High Castle shows Monroe singing the song for Adolf Hitler, with the line "Happy Birthday, Mr. President" replaced with "Happy Birthday, Mein Führer".

== See also ==
- List of individual dresses
