= The Legend of Marilyn Monroe =

- DVD cover
- Directed by: Terry Sanders
- Written by: Theodore Strauss; Terry Sanders
- Produced by: Terry Sanders; David L. Wolper
- Narrated by: John Huston
- Edited by: Terry Sanders
- Music by: Arthur Morton
- Distributed by: Take 2 Video (VHS)
- Release date: November 30, 1966
- Running time: 53 minutes
- Country: United States
- Language: English

The Legend of Marilyn Monroe is a 1966 American documentary film chronicling the life and career of actress Marilyn Monroe. Directed by Terry Sanders, and narrated by John Huston, the film was also released under the title The Marilyn Monroe Story in the UK.

== Cast ==
James Dougherty, Jerry Giesler, Milton H. Greene, Tom Kelley, Robert Mitchum, Lee Strasberg, Paula Strasberg, Eunice Murray Blackmer and Shelley Winters appear as themselves.

Theodore Curphey, Tony Curtis, Joe DiMaggio, John F. Kennedy, Peter Lawford, Groucho Marx, Arthur Miller, Laurence Olivier, Queen Elizabeth II, Jane Russell and Billy Wilder appear in archived footage.

== See also ==
- List of American films of 1966
