= The Ladd Company =

American film production company (1979–2007)

- Type: Movie Studio
- Industry: Film Production
- Founded: August 18, 1979
- Founder: Alan Ladd Jr., Jay Kanter, and Gareth Wigan
- Defunct: December 19, 2007
- Fate: Closed
- Successors: Library: Skydance Corporation via Warner Bros. (pre-1985 titles) and Paramount Pictures (including films distributed by Miramax)
- Headquarters: Hollywood, California

The Ladd Company was an American film production company founded by Alan Ladd Jr., Jay Kanter, and Gareth Wigan on August 18, 1979.

In 1979, the three founders were executives with 20th Century Fox; Ladd was the president. They announced their intention to leave the company when their contracts expired in December 1980 and form a new production company to be financed by Warner Bros. (Ladd had reportedly been quarreling with other Fox senior executives). Fox subsequently cut their contracts short, ending on October 1, 1979. The day after the contracts expired, the trio placed ads for the newly named "Ladd Company" in The Hollywood Reporter and Variety.

Under Warner Bros., The Ladd Company distributed Chariots of Fire, which won the 1981 Academy Award for Best Picture. Among the films it produced were the Space Race epic The Right Stuff, the space western Outland, Ridley Scott's science-fiction cult film Blade Runner, neo-noir film Body Heat, and the first two Police Academy films.

Police Academy proved very profitable. But the returns from the company's successes did not outweigh the box-office failures of The Right Stuff, the edited version of Sergio Leone's Once Upon a Time in America, and the animated Twice Upon a Time (co-production with Korty Films and Lucasfilm). On April 18, 1984, Alan Ladd Jr. and Warner Bros. parted ways, even though the former still had three years left on the studio's contract. From that point on, the company was not in an exclusive deal with a studio.

During a brief partnership with Paramount Pictures in the mid-1990s, the company produced The Brady Bunch Movie and the Best Picture Oscar winner Braveheart.

Ladd's later releases are the 2005 Lasse Hallström drama, An Unfinished Life, and the 2007 Casey Affleck drama Gone Baby Gone, both distributed by Miramax Films.

Of the Ladd Company's co-founders, Gareth Wigan died in Los Angeles on February 13, 2010, at the age of 78; Alan Ladd Jr. died of kidney failure in Los Angeles on March 2, 2022, at the age of 84; and Jay Kanter died in Beverly Hills, California, on August 6, 2024, at the age of 97.

== History ==
=== Beginnings ===
Alan Ladd Jr. had been a successful studio head of 20th Century Fox, helping make films such as Star Wars, Julia, Alien, The Turning Point, Young Frankenstein, An Unmarried Woman and Silver Streak. He ran into conflict with the company's chairman, Dennis Stanfill and wanted to leave. He left the company in June 1979 to set up his own company along with fellow executives Jay Kanter and Gareth Wigan. Under the terms of their severance with Fox, they were not allowed to start working until October 1, 1979.

The company was known as The Ladd Company and its symbol was a tree. "You could say it has a tie in with the tree of life," said Ladd. They signed a deal with Warner Bros who would finance and distribute their films, although the Ladd Company had creative control. Warner Bros would finance at least $75 million a year.

Ladd said he wanted to make "basically what I made at Fox. I don't think my attitude has changed. Those pictures went all over the place. There wasn't any specific theme to them," even films like Alien and The Omen, which he admits were "exploitation pictures." He believed he "tried to do it with more quality and style than just ripping off a theme."

=== Early films ===
On November 2, 1979, Ladd announced the company's first films: a Bette Midler concert movie (Ladd greenlit Midler's The Rose while at Fox) and Madonna Red, a $10 million Joseph L. Mankiewicz film starring Paul Newman as a Vietnam War veteran turned priest. Then they announced Five Days in Summer from Fred Zinnemann, who had made Julia, and Twice Upon a Time, a $3 million film from Lucasfilm.

The Midler film became Divine Madness (1980), but Madonna Red was never made. The first dramatic film the company ended making was Outland (1981), a science fiction film in the vein of Alien shot in England under Sandy Lieberson, the company's head of European operations. It was a commercial disappointment when released.

The Ladd Company's second film was going to be a Bernardo Bertolucci film starring Ugo Tognazzi. This was never made. However, the company had a critical and commercial hit with Body Heat (1981), the directorial debut of Lawrence Kasdan, then with Chariots of Fire (1981), a British film the company helped finance.

Looker (1981), from Michael Crichton, was a flop. The company helped make Blade Runner (1982), directed by Ridley Scott, which was a cult classic years after its theatrical release, but underperformed critically and commercially. Night Shift (1982), directed by Ron Howard, was a minor success.

=== Series of flops ===
However the company made a series of flops: Love Child (1982), Five Days One Summer (1982), Lovesick (1983) and Twice Upon a Time (1983).

The Ladd Company hoped for a big hit with the $28 million The Right Stuff (1983) but it only returned $10 million to the company. Larry Gross later wrote,

The Ladd Company, a director-friendly bunch, went down with The Right Stuff. Execs look very closely at what causes other companies to retire from the field. The levels of caution multiply.

Also unsuccessful were Star 80 (1983) and Mike's Murder (1983).

Ladd developed Country but sold the film to another company. They also had Splash from Ron Howard but put it in turnaround, as they did The Big Chill (1983).

The company had a huge hit with Police Academy (1984), made for $4.2 million which grossed $81 million and led to several sequels. Less successful were Purple Hearts (1984) and Once Upon a Time in America (1984) which the company extensively edited without the cooperation of Sergio Leone.

=== End of company ===
The success of Police Academy came too late to save the company. On April 19, 1984, Warners announced its association with the Ladd Company was over and Ladd became a nonexclusive production organization.

By July 16, 1984, the New York Times wrote that,

In essence, the Ladd Company no longer exists; although the label still exists, most of its executives have left. The company failed partly as a result of the dismal box-office record of many of its interesting, intelligent movies, including The Right Stuff, and partly because new management at Warner Brothers, which financed and distributed Ladd Company films, did not care to nurture the smaller movie company.

On July 18, 1984, Kanter left the company to become head of production at MGM/UA. Ladd followed, becoming head of MGM/UA in February 1985.

The last two films made by the company during its first incarnation were Police Academy 2: Their First Assignment (1985) and Doin' Time (1985).

=== Revival ===
Ladd was ousted from MGM/UA in the mid-1990s. He reformed The Ladd Company on February 17, 1995, and on May 24, 1995, produced the Oscar-winning film Braveheart, a film he was able to take with him from MGM/UA. Around that same time Ladd also produced The Phantom (1996) and A Very Brady Sequel (1996). The Ladd Company's final films were An Unfinished Life (2005) and Gone Baby Gone (2007), though Ladd continuing developing projects with the likes of Robert Altman, Emma Thompson, and more in subsequent years.

== List of films ==
The following films were produced by The Ladd Company:

Film	Release date	Studio	Notes
Divine Madness	September 26, 1980	Warner Bros.	
Chariots of Fire	May 15, 1981	Warner Bros. (Domestic) / 20th Century Fox (International)	Domestic distribution in association with Warner Bros. only.
Outland	May 22, 1981	Warner Bros.	
Body Heat	August 28, 1981	Warner Bros.	
Looker	October 30, 1981	Warner Bros.	
Tragedy of a Ridiculous Man	February 12, 1982	Warner Bros.	U.S. distribution only, subtitled version of an Italian film.
Blade Runner	June 25, 1982	Warner Bros.	Co-production with Shaw Brothers Studio and Blade Runner Partnership.
Night Shift	July 30, 1982	Warner Bros.	
Love Child	October 15, 1982	Warner Bros.	
Five Days One Summer	November 12, 1982	Warner Bros.	
Lovesick	February 18, 1983	Warner Bros.	
Twice Upon a Time	August 5, 1983	Warner Bros.	Co-production with Korty Films and Lucasfilm.
The Right Stuff	October 21, 1983	Warner Bros.	Limited release in October 1983, wide release in 1984.
Star 80	November 10, 1983	Warner Bros.	
Mike's Murder	March 9, 1984	Warner Bros.	
Police Academy	March 22, 1984	Warner Bros.	
Purple Hearts	March 30, 1984	Warner Bros.	
Once Upon a Time in America	June 1, 1984	Warner Bros (U.S.) / Titanus (Italy)	Thorn EMI distributed in the rest of the world except Italy made by Regency/Embassy International/Arnon Milchan
Police Academy 2: Their First Assignment	March 29, 1985	Warner Bros.	First The Ladd Company film not to have the company's logo screen at the beginning of the film.
Doin' Time	May 19, 1985	Warner Bros.	Final The Ladd Company picture released by Warner Bros..
The Brady Bunch Movie	February 17, 1995	Paramount Pictures	First The Ladd Company picture since 1985 and the first released by Paramount.
Braveheart	May 24, 1995	Paramount Pictures (Domestic) / 20th Century Fox (International)	Co-production with Icon Productions.
The Phantom	June 7, 1996	Paramount Pictures	Co-production with Village Roadshow Pictures.
A Very Brady Sequel	August 23, 1996	Paramount Pictures	The last film for their deal with Paramount Pictures.
An Unfinished Life	September 9, 2005	Miramax Films	Co-production with Revolution Studios.
Gone Baby Gone	October 19, 2007	Miramax Films	
