= 12305 Fifth Helena Drive =

Final residence of Marilyn Monroe

Coordinates: 34.0535°N 118.4782°W

12305 5th Helena Drive
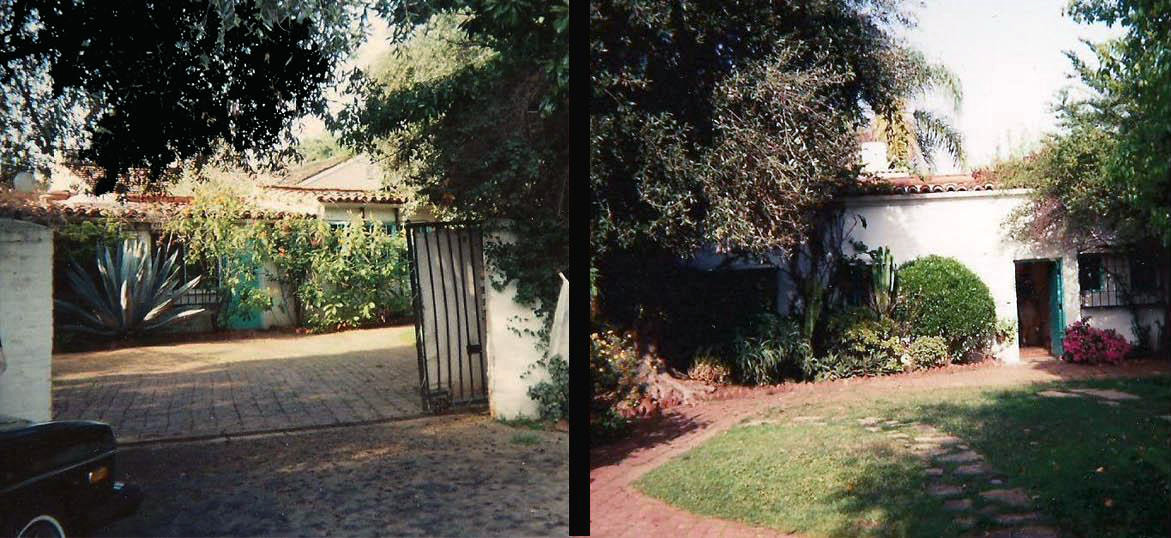
- Final residence of Marilyn Monroe, Brentwood, Los Angeles, California. Composite of two photos.

General information
- Architectural style: Hacienda
- Location: 12305 5th Helena Drive, Brentwood, Los Angeles, California
- Completed: 1929
- Client: Marilyn Monroe

Technical details
- Size: 2,900 sq.ft.

Other information
- Number of rooms: 4 bedrooms, 2 bathrooms

12305 5th Helena Dr. is a house in Brentwood, Los Angeles, California owned and occupied by American actress Marilyn Monroe in the last year of her life. She died there on August 4, 1962.

== History ==
The single-story Spanish colonial revival-style home sits on 2,900 square feet at the end of a quiet cul-de-sac off South Carmelina Avenue. The L-shaped property now consists of four bedrooms (only two existed when Monroe lived there) and three bathrooms. In the backyard, a free-form pool is adjacent to a citrus grove. The guest house is on the left side of the driveway as seen from the front gate.

The house has a concrete threshold inlaid with four ceramic tiles painted with the Hunter family clan crest and a Latin motto 'Cursum Perficio' (literally translated as 'Course Perfected' and interpreted as 'My journey ends here' or 'I complete the course'.) This has been read as a foreshadowing of Monroe's death, six months after she purchased the property in 1962. The 2024 application for the home's historic monument status in connection to both the Hunter family and Marilyn Monroe, demonstrates the tiles depict the Hunter family's ancient Scottish coat of arms.

Constructed in 1929, its architect and original owner have not been recorded by the Los Angeles Dept of City Planning, and are deemed to be unknown. Its first documented owners and occupiers are recorded in the 1930 Los Angeles census as Richard Hunter, actor, his wife Martha and their two adult sons and daughter-in-law: Asa Michael Hunter, Harbin Francis Hunter, architect, and Harbin's wife Marie. The sons were notable architects who developed integral parts of Southern California. The family were descendants of Scottish-descent prospectors brought to California by the gold rush of 1849.

== Ownership ==
In February 1962, Monroe purchased the property for $77,500. She reportedly paid half in cash and took out a mortgage for the second half. In the early morning of Sunday, August 5, 1962, six months after purchasing the home, Monroe was found dead of a barbiturate overdose in her bedroom. The property has had 14 subsequent owners.

In 2017, the house was put up for sale for $6.9 million and eventually sold for $7.25 million. The buyers were an LLC called "Glory of the Snow", managed by Dan Lukas and Anne Jarmain. In the summer of 2023, Emerald Lake hedge fund manager Dan Lukas and his wife sold the property in an off-market sale for $8.4 million to "Glory of the Snow Trust", which immediately filed for a demolition permit. The legally required physical notice was not posted on the property by the property owner, and the legally required notification was not made by LADBS to the local council office and neighborhood council equivalent. According to news reports, the new owner "Glory of the Snow Trust" is managed by "Andrew Sahure"; however, the name appears to be a typographical error for "Andrew Schure."

In 2023, Brinah Milstein, an entrepreneur, and Roy Bank, a reality television producer (Are You Smarter than a 5th Grader?), bought the house for $8.35 million. They also own the property next door.

In September 2023, a Change.org petition started, asking the City to turn the home into a museum. A motion asking to have the property listed as historical was handed in to Los Angeles Cultural Heritage Commission by Councilmember Traci Park on September 8.

In 2024, the Los Angeles City Council approved Monroe's house being designated as a Historic Cultural Monument.

In 2026, Brinah Milstein and Roy Bank argued that the Government of Los Angeles, by "turning their house into a protected landmark, is forcing them to shoulder the costs of a public benefit", in Los Angeles federal court.
