= Henry T. Weinstein =

American film producer

Henry T. Weinstein (July 12, 1924, Brooklyn, New York City, United States – September 17, 2000, Boca Raton, Florida, United States) was an American film producer.

== Biography ==
Born and raised in Brooklyn, Weinstein graduated from City College of New York and earned a master's degree in drama from Carnegie Institute of Technology. He began his theatre work as a director at playhouses in Falmouth and Norwich, and was the stage manager for The Innocents on Broadway.

Weinstein was the general manager of the Falmouth Playhouse on Cape Cod for two years, at which he premiered A View from the Bridge by Arthur Miller, before joining Philip Langner as co-manager in 1958 at the Westport Country Playhouse. Weinstein and Langner packaged shows for the summer stock theatre circuit.

When Langner left in 1959, Weinstein brought in Laurence Feldman, whom he had worked with on the Theatre Fund, as co-producer and partner. Weinstein operated the Westport Playhouse until 1961, and Feldman continued through 1963. Weinstein and Feldman formed the Laurence Henry Company for their producing and packaging company. They purchased the lease of the Paper Mill Playhouse (Millburn, New Jersey) in 1960, the Mineola Playhouse (Long Island, New York) in 1962, and the Brown Theatre (Louisville, Kentucky) in 1963.

Weinstein joined the Westport Playhouse again in the mid-1970s as artistic director, returning to movies and television after the 1978 season.

Weinstein was the producer for Something's Got to Give with Marilyn Monroe. From the beginning its production was disrupted by her personal troubles, and after her death on August 4, 1962, the film was abandoned. He was the producer of The Play of the Week which won a Peabody Award. He was also the executive-in-charge-of-production for the American Film Theatre, producing A Delicate Balance, among other films. Weinstein was executive producer for American Playhouse and the Oscar-nominated movie Runaway Train. As a producer, he had a reputation for quality work. He retired in the mid-1990s.

Weinstein died in Boca Raton, Florida on September 17, 2000, after a lengthy illness.

== Filmography as producer ==
- Something's Got to Give (1962, unfinished)
- Tender Is the Night (1962)
- Joy in the Morning (1965)
- Cervantes (1967)
- The Promise (1969)

== Filmography as executive producer ==
- The Magic Christian (1969)
- Bitka na Neretvi (1969)
- Julius Caesar (1970)
- Tam Lin (1970)
- The Homecoming (1973)
- Butley (1974)
- Rhinoceros (1974)
- Runaway Train (1985)
- 52 Pick-Up (1986)
- Texasville (1988)
