= Peter Levathes =

American film and advertising executive (1911–2002)

Peter Levathes (28 July 1911 – 9 January 2002) was an American film and advertising executive, best known for briefly running 20th Century Fox.

== Biography ==
Levathes was born in Pittsburgh and grew up in Washington. He attended Harvard University and studied law at Georgetown University. joined Fox in 1937 as legal assistant to Spyros Skouras, president of the company. During World War II he was a special agent with the FBI in Brazil, helping survey German military operations in Latin American.

From 1945–52 he led the Fox news and television production departments. He helped put together the documentary Crusade in Europe, worked as a television consultant to Citizens for Eisenhower in 1952, then as vice president in change of media and television for advertising agency Young & Rubicam for eight years.

== Production Chief at Fox ==
He left advertising in 1959 to run Fox's television division. In May 1961 he was appointed head of production, replacing Robert Goldstein, who had been doing the job since the death of Buddy Adler.

Among Levathes main actions at Fox were:

- signing Irwin Allen to a three-picture contract
- signing Rod Taylor to a deal for films and television
- purchasing the rights to Doctor Dolittle

In March 1962 Levathes announced Fox would make 14 films from a possible 17 including:

- two unnamed productions from Darryl F. Zanuck
- Gideon Goes to War from Mark Robson
- Something's Got to Give starring Marilyn Monroe
- The Story of General Patton
- The Jungle from the novel by James Michener
- First Love from the play based on the Romain Gary novel
- The Enemy Within based on the book by Robert F. Kennedy produced by Jerry Wald
- Celebration based on the play by William Inge produced by Wald
- Ulysses based on the novel by James Joyce produced by Wald
- Take Her She's Mine based on the hit play
- The Battle of Leyte Gulf
- Happily Ever After based on the story by Vera Caspry
- Drink to Me Only by Ira Wallack and Abram S. Giness
- Evil Come, Evil Go a suspense story starring Pat Boone
- Love in a Cool Climate based on novel by Frederick Kohner to star Ann-Margret and Pamela Tiffin
- Five Weeks in a Balloon based on novel by Jules Verne

Levathes cancelled Something's Got to Give during production. Later that month his champion, Spyrous Skouras, was forced to retire. Daryl F. Zanuck returned as president and Levathes resigned from his position in August, becoming head of television. Ulysses, Promise at Dawn and Take Her, She's Mine were all postponed.

He was fired from Fox in 1962, then returned to advertising.

== Films made/developed under Levathes at Fox ==
- Five Weeks in a Balloon (1962)
- Tender Is the Night (1962)
- Cleopatra (1963)
- Something's Got to Give (1963) (abandoned)

=== Films purchased but made under different regime ===
- The Sound of Music (1965)

=== Films announced but not made ===
- A Summer World (1962) – postponed
- The Greatest Story Ever Told – studio passed on project, which was made by United Artists
- Big River, Big Man
