= Bernard Spindel =

American surveillance and wiretapping expert (1923–1971)

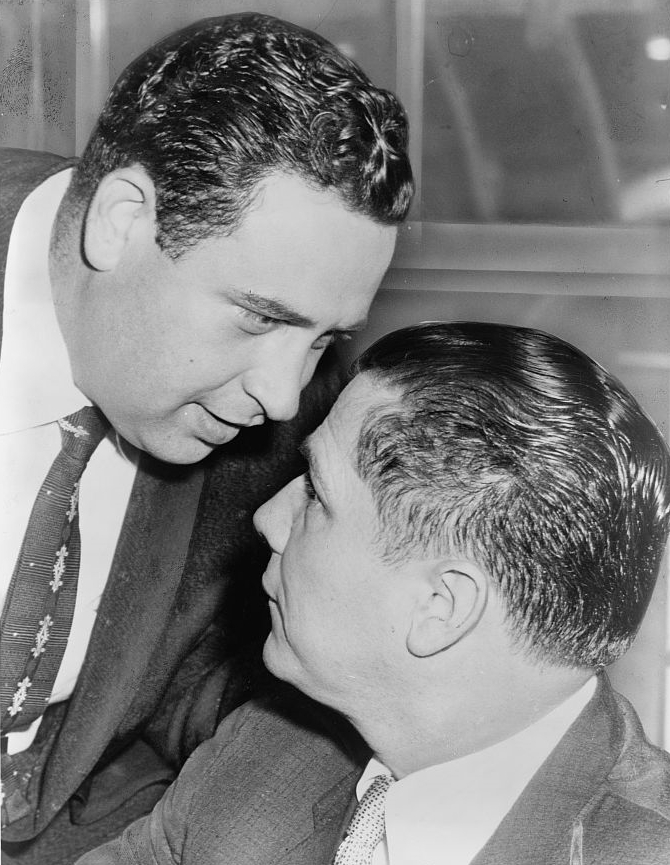
- Bernard Spindel (left) and Jimmy Hoffa after a 1957 court session in which they pleaded not guilty to illegal wiretap charges
- Born: Bernard B. Spindel; November 9, 1923; New York City, U.S.
- Died: February 4, 1971 (aged 47); New York City, U.S.
- Occupations: Surveillance expert, pilot
- Spouse: Barbara Fox Spindel

Bernard B. Spindel (November 9, 1923 – February 4, 1971) was an American surveillance, wiretapping, electronics and lockpicking expert, generally regarded as the best in his field, and a pilot. He was responsible for eliminating more bugs and wiretaps than anyone in history.

== Electronic surveillance ==
Bernard B. Spindel was an electronic eavesdropping and surveillance technician in the early Cold War known for both his operational prowess and his mastery of the technology. Jim Hougan described Spindel as "a wire-man of unequaled genius… the Nikola Tesla of electronic eavesdropping." A 1966 article in Life magazine named Spindel the "No. 1 big-league freelance eavesdropper and wiretapper in the U.S."

=== The Hoffa connection ===
Spindel is known for his involvement in union leader Jimmy Hoffa's 1964 criminal trial and 1957 trial where in 1957 Spindel and Hoffa pleaded not guilty to accusations of illegal wiretapping. The 1957 indictment stated that in 1953 Hoffa paid Spindel $8,429 in union funds to wiretap Teamster headquarters in Detroit.

== Personal life ==
Spindel was married to Barbara Fox Spindel, founder and co-owner of the B. R. Fox Spindel Company.

In the 1960s, Spindel lived in a small estate in Homes, New York, with his wife, seven children, two dogs and four horses.

Spindel's autobiography was published in 1968, entitled The Ominous Ear. He died on February 4, 1971, from a heart attack, having been under a prison sentence for his electronic eavesdropping. He was 47 years old.

== Publications ==
- The Ominous Ear. New York: Award House (1968). OCLC 440580.
  - Excerpt: Chapter 17: Technical Aspects.
