= Allan "Whitey" Snyder =

American make-up artist (1914–1994)

- Born: August 7, 1914; New Jersey, U.S.
- Died: April 16, 1994 (aged 79); Hansville, Washington, U.S.
- Other names: Allan Whitey Snyder; Alan Snyder; Allen Snyder; Alan Snider
- Occupation: Makeup artist
- Years active: 1948–1987
- Spouses: Beverly Bray (m. 1937; div. 1970) Marjorie Plecher (m. 1970)
- Children: 2

Allan "Whitey" Snyder (August 7, 1914 – April 16, 1994) was an American Hollywood make-up artist and is best remembered as the personal makeup artist of Marilyn Monroe.

== Career ==
Allan Snyder began his long career as a makeup artist in 1948. He first began his career as an assistant make-up artist on the film The Walls of Jericho.

Whitey Snyder was Marilyn Monroe's makeup artist throughout her career: from her first screen test at Twentieth Century Fox in 1946 to her funeral makeup in 1962. The pair developed a very close working relationship. Towards the end of her life, Monroe asked Snyder to prepare her face if she were to die before him. This was a promise that he fulfilled, after her death in August 1962. Snyder was also a pall-bearer at her funeral.

For his work, Snyder was twice nominated for Primetime Emmy Awards, under the category of Outstanding Achievement in Make-Up. These nominations came in 1978 for his work on the TV Biopic Marilyn: The Untold Story and in 1981 for Little House on the Prairie. His last project was the 1984 television series Highway to Heaven, which he worked on from 1984 to 1987.

== Personal life ==
Snyder was married to Beverly Bray from 1937 until their divorce in 1970. They had two children: son Ron, a former makeup artist and ex-husband of film star Kim Basinger, and daughter Sherrill. His second wife, from 1970 until his death, was costumer Marjorie Plecher, who had also worked as the wardrobe director on several of Marilyn Monroe's films.

== Death ==
Snyder died on April 16, 1994, in Hansville, Washington.

== In popular culture ==
In the 2022 Netflix film Blonde, Snyder was portrayed by Toby Huss.

== Filmography ==
Film
Year	Title	Notes
1948	The Walls of Jericho	Assistant makeup artist Uncredited
1948	That Wonderful Urge	Uncredited
1949	The Fan	Uncredited
1949	The Beautiful Blonde from Bashful Bend	Uncredited
1949	It Happens Every Spring	Uncredited
1948	Everybody Does It	Credited as Alan Snyder
1949	Whirlpool	Uncredited
1950	My Blue Heaven	
1950	Two Flags West	
1950	For Heaven's Sake	Credited as Alan Snyder
1952	Viva Zapata!	Uncredited
1952	Monkey Business	Makeup artist to Marilyn Monroe; Uncredited
1953	Niagara	Makeup artist to Marilyn Monroe; Uncredited
1953	Gentlemen Prefer Blondes	Makeup artist to Marilyn Monroe; Uncredited
1953	How to Marry a Millionaire	Uncredited
1954	River of No Return	Makeup artist to Marilyn Monroe; Uncredited
1954	There's No Business Like Show Business	Makeup artist to Marilyn Monroe; Uncredited
1955	The Seven Year Itch	Makeup artist to Marilyn Monroe; Uncredited
1956	Bus Stop	Makeup artist to Marilyn Monroe; Uncredited
1956	Around the World in 80 Days	Uncredited
1957	Peyton Place	Uncredited
1958	South Pacific	Uncredited
1958	The Naked and the Dead	Makeup supervisor
1958	Earth vs. the Spider	Credited as Allen Snyder
1958	Rally 'Round the Flag, Boys!	Uncredited
1958	The Lost Missile	Credited as Alan Snyder
1959	Verboten!	Credited as Allen Snyder
1959	The Diary of Anne Frank	Uncredited
1959	Some Like It Hot	Makeup artist to Marilyn Monroe; Uncredited
1959	Born to Be Loved	
1960	Let's Make Love	Uncredited
1961	The Misfits	
1961	King of the Roaring 20's: The Story of Arnold Rothstein	
1962	Something's Got to Give	Makeup artist to Marilyn Monroe; Uncredited
1963	Tammy and the Doctor	
1965	Boeing Boeing	
1966	What Did You Do in the War, Daddy?	
1968	The Party	Makeup supervisor
1968	Rosemary's Baby	
1970	Darling Lili	Credited as Allen Snyder
1970	The Moonshine War	
1970	How Do I Love Thee?	Makeup artist to Maureen O'Hara
1971	Pretty Maids All in a Row	
1971	Big Jake	Uncredited
1971	The Marriage of a Young Stockbroker	Credited as Alan Snyder
1971	The Steagle	
1971	Diamonds Are Forever	Uncredited
1972	1776	
1972	The Poseidon Adventure	
1973	Scream Blacula Scream	Credited as Alan Snider
1976	A Star Is Born	
1977	The Goodbye Girl	Credited as Allan Whitey Snyder
1984	Racing with the Moon	
1984	Sam's Son	

Television
Year	Title	Notes
1973	The Red Pony	Television movie
1974	The Underground Man	Television movie
1974-1983	Little House on the Prairie	190 episodes
1975	The 1975 Fashion Awards	Television special
1976	Brenda Starr	Television movie
1976	The Loneliest Runner	Television movie
1978	Mitzi... What's Hot, What's Not	Television special
1980	Marilyn: The Untold Story	Television movie
1981	Father Murphy	Episode: "Father Murphy"
1983	Love is Forever	Television movie
1984	Little House: The Last Farewell	Television movie
1984	Little House: Bless All the Dear Children	Television movie
1984-1987	Highway to Heaven	68 episodes
