= Gareth Wigan =

British agent and producer (1931–2010)

- Born: 2 December 1931; London, England, United Kingdom
- Died: 13 February 2010 (aged 78); Los Angeles, California, United States
- Education: University of Oxford
- Occupations: Talent agent, film producer, studio executive
- Spouse(s): Heather Germann, Georgia Brown, Patricia Newcomb
- Children: 4

Gareth Wigan (2 December 1931 – 13 February 2010) was a British agent, producer and studio executive known for working on such films as George Lucas's Star Wars. His early recognition of the power of the global entertainment market allowed his employer, Sony Pictures Entertainment, to take advantage of films such as Crouching Tiger, Hidden Dragon.

== Life and career ==
Gareth Wigan was born in London on 2 December 1931. After graduating from Oxford in 1952 with a B.A. Honours degree in English literature, he began his career as a literary agent in the London office of MCA. He eventually founded an agency with Richard Gregson, Gregson & Wigan. Among his clients was the British playwright Giles Cooper whose story, "Unman, Wittering and Zigo" originally written for radio, was the first film Wigan produced, directed by John Mackenzie and starring David Hemmings. Gregson and Wigan was sold to EMI in 1970 and Gareth Wigan subsequently moved to Los Angeles.

Over the course of a 40-year career, Wigan rose from talent agent, to producer to studio head. Film credits include Star Wars, Alien, The Turning Point, Chariots of Fire, The Right Stuff, Bram Stoker's Dracula, Kick-Ass and others.

He held numerous positions including Production Executive at 20th Century Fox, co-Vice Chairman at Columbia TriStar Motion Picture Group, a co-founder at The Ladd Company, production consultant at Columbia and more.

== Death ==
Gareth Wigan died at his home in Los Angeles on 13 February 2010, at the age of 78. Divorced by his first wife, Heather Germann, and pre-deceased by his second wife, Georgia Brown, he was survived by his third wife, Patricia Newcomb, and four children. A dedication to Wigan appears at the end credits of the 2010 film Kick-Ass.
