= Barbiturate overdose =

Medical condition

- Other names: Barbiturate poisoning, barbiturate toxicity
- Molecular diagram of phenobarbital
- Specialty: Toxicology, emergency medicine
- Symptoms: Decreased breathing, decreased level of consciousness
- Complications: Noncardiogenic pulmonary edema
- Duration: 6–12 hours
- Causes: Accidental, suicide
- Diagnostic method: Blood or urine tests
- Treatment: medical support, activated charcoal
- Frequency: Uncommon

Barbiturate overdose is poisoning due to excessive doses of barbiturates. Symptoms of barbiturate overdose typically include difficulty thinking, poor coordination, decreased level of consciousness, and a decreased effort to breathe (respiratory depression). Complications of overdose can include noncardiogenic pulmonary edema. If death occurs, it is typically due to a lack of breathing.

Barbiturate overdose may occur by accident or purposefully in an attempt to cause death. The toxic effects are additive to those of alcohol and benzodiazepines. The lethal dose varies with a person's tolerance and how the drug is taken. The effects of barbiturates occur via the GABA neurotransmitter. Exposure may be verified by testing the urine or blood.

While once a common cause of overdose, barbiturates are now a rare cause.

== Mechanism ==
Barbiturates increase the time that the chloride pore of the GABA_{A} receptor is opened, thereby increasing the efficacy of GABA. In contrast, benzodiazepines increase the frequency with which the chloride pore is opened, thereby increasing GABA's potency.

== Treatment ==
Treatment involves supporting a person's breathing and blood pressure. While there is no antidote, activated charcoal may be useful. Multiple doses of charcoal may be required. Hemodialysis may occasionally be considered. Urinary alkalinization with sodium bicarbonate may be useful for barbiturate poisoning, targeting a urinary pH greater than 7.5 and ensuring urine output surpasses 2 mL/kg/min.

If a person is drowsy but awake and can swallow and breathe without difficulty, the treatment can be as simple as monitoring the person closely. If the person is not breathing, it may involve mechanical ventilation until the drug has worn off. Psychiatric consult is generally recommended.

== Notable cases ==
People who are known to have died by suicide from barbiturate overdose include Stefan Zweig, Gillian Bennett, Charles Boyer, Ruan Lingyu, Victor Folke Nelson, Dalida, Jeanne-Paule Marie Deckers, Felix Hausdorff, Abbie Hoffman, Phyllis Hyman, Marilyn Monroe, Cesare Pavese, C. P. Ramanujam, George Sanders, Carole Landis, Jean Seberg, Lupe Vélez and the members of the Heaven's Gate cult. Others who have died as a result of accidental barbiturate overdose include Pier Angeli, Brian Epstein, Judy Garland, Jimi Hendrix, Inger Stevens, Dinah Washington, Ellen Wilkinson, Mary Ure, and Alan Wilson; in some cases these have been speculated to be suicides as well. Those who died of a combination of barbiturates and other drugs include Rainer Werner Fassbinder, Dorothy Kilgallen, Malcolm Lowry, Edie Sedgwick and Kenneth Williams. Dorothy Dandridge died of either an overdose or an unrelated embolism. Ingeborg Bachmann may have died of the consequences of barbiturate withdrawal (she was hospitalized with burns, the doctors treating her not being aware of her barbiturate addiction). Maurice Chevalier attempted suicide in March 1971 by swallowing a large amount of barbiturates and slitting his wrists. While he lived, he suffered severe organ damage as a result and died from multiple organ failure nine months later.

== Differential diagnosis ==
The differential diagnosis should include intoxication by other substances with sedative effects, such as benzodiazepines, anticonvulsants (carbamazepine), alcohols (ethanol, ethylene glycol, methanol), opioids, carbon monoxide, sleep aids, and gamma-Hydroxybutyric acid (GHB). Natural disease that can result in disorientation may be in the differential, including hypoglycemia and myxedema coma. In the right setting, hypothermia should be ruled out.
