= Ralph Greenson =

American psychiatrist (1911–1979)

- Born: Romeo Samuel Greenschpoon; September 20, 1911; New York City, U.S.
- Died: November 24, 1979 (aged 68); Los Angeles, California, U.S.
- Other name: Ralph R. Greenson
- Education: Columbia University
- Occupation: Psychiatrist
- Known for: Personal Psychiatrist to Marilyn Monroe

Ralph R. Greenson (born Romeo Samuel Greenschpoon; September 20, 1911 – November 24, 1979) was a prominent American psychiatrist and psychoanalyst. Greenson is best known as Marilyn Monroe's psychiatrist. He was the basis for Leo Rosten's 1963 novel, Captain Newman, M.D. The book was later made into a movie starring Gregory Peck as Greenson's character.

Greenson treated returning WWII soldiers suffering from post-traumatic stress disorder. He also had other famous clients such as Tony Curtis, Frank Sinatra, and Vivien Leigh. Greenson and his wife, Hildi Greenson, were the darlings of the Southern California psychoanalytic community and intellectuals, and associated with entertainment industry leaders. They were good friends with Anna Freud, Fawn Brodie and Margaret Mead.

== Biography ==
He graduated from Columbia University in New York City. In a time when Jews were not readily accepted into American medical schools, he studied medicine in Bern, Switzerland, and was analysed by Wilhelm Stekel, a student of Sigmund Freud, and again by Otto Fenichel and Frances Deri in Los Angeles.

He published psychoanalytic material often dealing with analyzability, beginning of analysis, interpretations, dreams, working through, acting out, countertransference, and termination. His article On Gambling drew on his own "observations on gambling in the U. S. Army from 1942 to 1946, primarily among officers." In retrospect, "Greenson's essay is interesting because, unlike many other analysts, he considers cultural and historical material to be relevant, while accepting the overriding importance of the Oedipal conflict."

In working with borderline patients, he proposed a "modified psychoanalytic approach ... a basically neutral technical position of the therapist, and only a minimum deviation from such a position of neutrality as might be necessary."

Greenson was named a clinical professor of psychiatry at the UCLA School of Medicine and served on the Board on Professional Standards and the Committee on Institutes in The American. He published fifty-three papers in psychoanalytic journals. The Technique and Practice of Psychoanalysis, published in 1967, has been described as "a thorough, highly technical textbook, with an instructive treatment of the working alliance," and stands "among the classic writings ... relating to the technique of psychoanalysis." In it "Greenson says that it's important for the patient to distinguish between his transference relations to the analyst and his realistic perceptions of him ... 'the non-transference relationship'" – views criticized however by Charles Brenner as "what Brenner calls resistive myths – myths that analysts who are unable to tolerate analytic abstinence have invented to justify their lapses from neutrality."

In 1968 Ralph Greenson offered a developmental theory for homosexuality, which focuses on the need of boys to "dis-identify" from their mothers:

The male child, in order to attain a healthy sense of maleness, must replace the primary object of his identification, the mother, and must identify instead with the father. I believe it is the difficulties inherent in this additional step of development, from which girls are exempt, which are responsible for certain special problems in the man's gender identity, his sense of belonging to the male sex. ... The male child's ability to dis-identify will determine the success or failure of his later identification with his father.

– Ralph R. Greenson, "Dis-Identifying From Mother: Its Special Importance for the Boy," International Journal of Psychoanalysis, 49 (1968): 370.

== Bibliography ==
- The Technique and Practice of Psychoanalysis. Vol. I, by Ralph R. Greenson. New York: International Universities Press, Inc., 1967. (Volume II of Ralph Greenson's much used, textbook of psychoanalysis was never written.)
- The Technique and Practice of Psychoanalysis, Vol.2: A Memorial Volume to Ralph R. Greenson. Monograph series of Ralph R.Greenson Memorial Library of the San Diego Psychoanalytic Society and Institute. Monograph 1. eds. A. Sugarman, R. A. Nemiroff & D. P. Greenson. Madison, CT: International Universities Press, 1992.
- Explorations in Psychoanalysis: By Ralph R. Greenson, M.D. New York: International Universities Press, Inc., 1978.
- Papers of Online Archive of California
