= Lois Banner =

American historian

Lois Wendland Banner (born 1939) is an American author and emeritus professor of history at the University of Southern California. She is one of the earliest academics to focus on women's history in the United States. Her work includes biographies of Margaret Mead, Ruth Benedict, Marilyn Monroe and Greta Garbo as well as the textbook Women in Modern America: A Brief History.

She was born Lois Wendland on July 26, 1939, in Los Angeles, California, the daughter of Harry J. and Melba Wendland.

She received her doctorate of philosophy from Columbia University in 1970. Her doctoral dissertation was on religious benevolence and reform in the antebellum era. Realizing the many women who were leaders in that movement pointed her towards women’s history when she taught in the History Department of Douglass College of Rutgers University. While at Douglass she wrote the textbook Women in Modern America: A Brief History, which is commonly used in introductory Women's Studies classes at the university level. Commencing with the second edition she included scholarship on race, class, gender, ethnicity and sexual orientation. Banner subsequently taught at Princeton, George Washington University, Stanford University, the University of Scranton, Hamilton College and UCLA before achieving tenure and a full professorship at the University of Southern California in History and Gender and Sexuality Studies.

In 1983, she released American Beauty about which scholar Ann Douglas of Columbia University wrote: "Banner is alert to several interesting aspects of the story that she chronicles. She sees the matter of the definition and marketing of beauty as a complex process: those involved were able to impose their high valuation of female good looks on a public that already equated beauty with femininity, yet they were unable to stabilize and market a single type of beauty."

In 1992 Banner published In Full Flower: Aging Women, Power, and Sexuality about which Publishers Weekly noted: “This is a masterwork of scholarship and a milestone in our understanding of how Western civilization has demeaned the older woman. … Like an archeologist, the author sifts through myth, literature and history--her Rosetta stone, the film Sunset Boulevard. … Banner turns to African American women for positive middle-aged and elder role models in a study that helps set the historical record straight.”

Banner later wrote about the intellectual history of the United States and anthropology's place in that story with her 2003 book Intertwined Lives: Margaret Mead, Ruth Benedict, and Their Circle: "By focusing on the interplay of Benedict, Mead, their husbands, friends, lovers, and protégés, [Banner] takes readers well beyond the two women’s published work and shows the genesis of their thoughts on human plasticity, diversity, potential, configurations, and patterns, all pearls on a string of shared ideas."

In Marilyn: The Passion and the Paradox she focused on the iconic American actress with an unusual angle: “Banner is less interested in definitively collapsing the poles than in teasing out the contradictions and underlying motives of a complex character. She takes us through Marilyn’s nomadic childhood to her breakthrough in Hollywood and her storybook marriage to Joe DiMaggio, to her escape to Miller and acting classes in New York, to her brief and ultimately tragic return to Hollywood," wrote Zoë Slutzky of the New York Times.

In his book of Monroe, author Larry Jordan criticized Lois Banner for suggesting that Monroe may have committed suicide due to being unable to control alleged lesbian impulses. Literary scholar Sarah Churchwell has observed that most biographers treat Monroe’s supposed bisexuality as an open question, while some attempt to use it to advance ideological arguments. Monroe's former publicist Pat Newcomb stated that Monroe had no anxiety regarding homosexuality. Jordan has also disputed theories that Monroe was a communist and criticized Banner for implying that Monroe supported Fidel Castro, arguing that in 1960 Castro had not yet declared himself a communist and still had some support in the United States.

She also published a book on spiritual communes in the 1970s and their connection to Christian religions and Islam, in Finding Fran (Columbia University Press, 1989). Her many awards include the Bode-Pearson Lifetime Achievement Award from the American Studies Association, of which she was the first female President.

In 1973 she and Mary S. Hartman founded the now triennial Berkshire Conference on the History of Women, Genders, and Sexualities, run by the Berkshire Conference of Women Historians. They also edited the proceedings of that conference, Clio’s Consciousness Raised: New Perspectives on the History of Women (1974), the first academic edited collection in women's history.

At 84 years old, Banner made racist public comments at the 2023 Berkshire conference that resulted in condemnation from the audience and on social media. During a speech, Banner, an 84 year old white woman, wished she was black, claiming it would have made her career easier.

== Selected publications ==
Books

- Ideal Beauty: The Life and Times of Greta Garbo, Rutgers University Press, 2023: ISBN 9781978806504.
- Marilyn: The Passion and the Paradox, Bloomsbury USA, 2012: ISBN 9781608195312.
- MM-Personal: From the Private Archive of Marilyn Monroe, Abrams, 2011.
- Intertwined Lives: Margaret Mead, Ruth Benedict, and Their Circle, Alfred Knopf, 2003.
- In Full Flower: Aging Women, Power, and Sexuality, Alfred Knopf, 1992.
- Finding Fran: History and Memory in the Lives of Two Women, Columbia University Press, 1998.
- American Beauty, Alfred Knopf, 1983.
- Elizabeth Cady Stanton: A Radical for Women's Rights. Addison-Wesley Publishers, 1979.
- Women in Modern America: A Brief History, 1974.

Articles

- "The Mystery Woman of Hollywood: Greta Garbo, Feminism, and Stardom," Feminist Media Studies, forthcoming.
- "Biography as History," American Historical Review, June, 2009.
- “The Creature from the Black Lagoon: Marilyn Monroe and Whiteness,” Cinema Studies, Summer, 2008.
- "Mannish Women, Passive Men, and Constitutional Types: Margaret Mead's Sex and Temperament in Three Primitive Societies as a Response to Ruth Benedict's Patterns of Culture," Signs: Journal of Women in Culture and Society, March 2003.
- "The Bo-Cu Plant: Gender in the Life and Writings of Ruth Benedict," in Janiewski and Banner, Reading Benedict, Reading Mead (Baltimore: Johns Hopkins University Press, 2004).
- "The Irony of Memory: Finding a Los(t) Angeles," Pacific Historical Review, Spring, 1994.
- "Autobiography and Biography: Intermixing the Genres," Auto/Biography Studies, Fall, 1993.
- "The Meaning of Menopause: Aging and Its Twentieth Century Contexts," Working Papers, Center for Twentieth Century Studies, University of Wisconsin, Milwaukee, Fall 1989.

== Recognition ==
- Berlin Prize Fellow, American Academy in Berlin, 2020
- Bode-Pearson Lifetime Achievement Award, American Studies Association, 2006-2007
- Mellon Award for Excellence in Mentoring, 2005-06
- Carl Bode-Norman Holmes Pearson Prize for lifetime achievement, American Studies Association, 2005
- Fellow, History Program, Research School of Social Sciences, Australian National University Canberra, Australia, May-August, 2004
- Fulbright Chair, University of Uppsala
- Fulbright Experts Grant, New Zealand, August, 2004
- Outstanding teaching award, General Education, 2002-03
- USC Raubenheimer Outstanding Senior Faculty Award, 1996
- USC Phi Kappa Phi Faculty Recognition Award, 1990
- USC Associates Award For Creativity In Research And Scholarship, 1989
- Rockefeller Fellowship Recipient, Humanities Fellow, Rockefeller Foundation, 1978-79
- Fellow, Radcliffe Institute, 1974-75

== Academic Experience ==
- U.S. Fulbright Commission, Distinguished Chair, University Of Uppsala, Spring, 2017
- Professor, University of Southern California (History and Gender Studies), 1983-2014
- Adjunct Professor, Josai International University, Tokyo, 1996-99
- Director, National Endowment for the Humanities Summer Seminar for College Teachers, University of Southern California: "The New Gender Scholarship" Summer, 1992
- Director, National Endowment for the Humanities Summer Seminar for College Teachers, George Washington University, "Men, Women, and Popular Culture" Summer, 1984
- William Robertson Coe Professor, Stanford University, Summer, 1983
- Jane Watson Irwin Professor, Hamilton College, Spring, 1983
- Visiting Associate Professor, U.C.L.A., Summer, 1982
- Visiting Associate Professor, George Washington University, 1981-83
- Visiting Senior Lecturer, University of Maryland, Baltimore County, 1980-81
- National Endowment for the Humanities Professor, University of Scranton, 1979-80
- Princeton University, Lecturer, 1977-78
- Douglass College, Rutgers University, Lecturer and Assistant Professor, 1967-1977
