= Marilyn Monroe =

American actress and model (1926–1962)

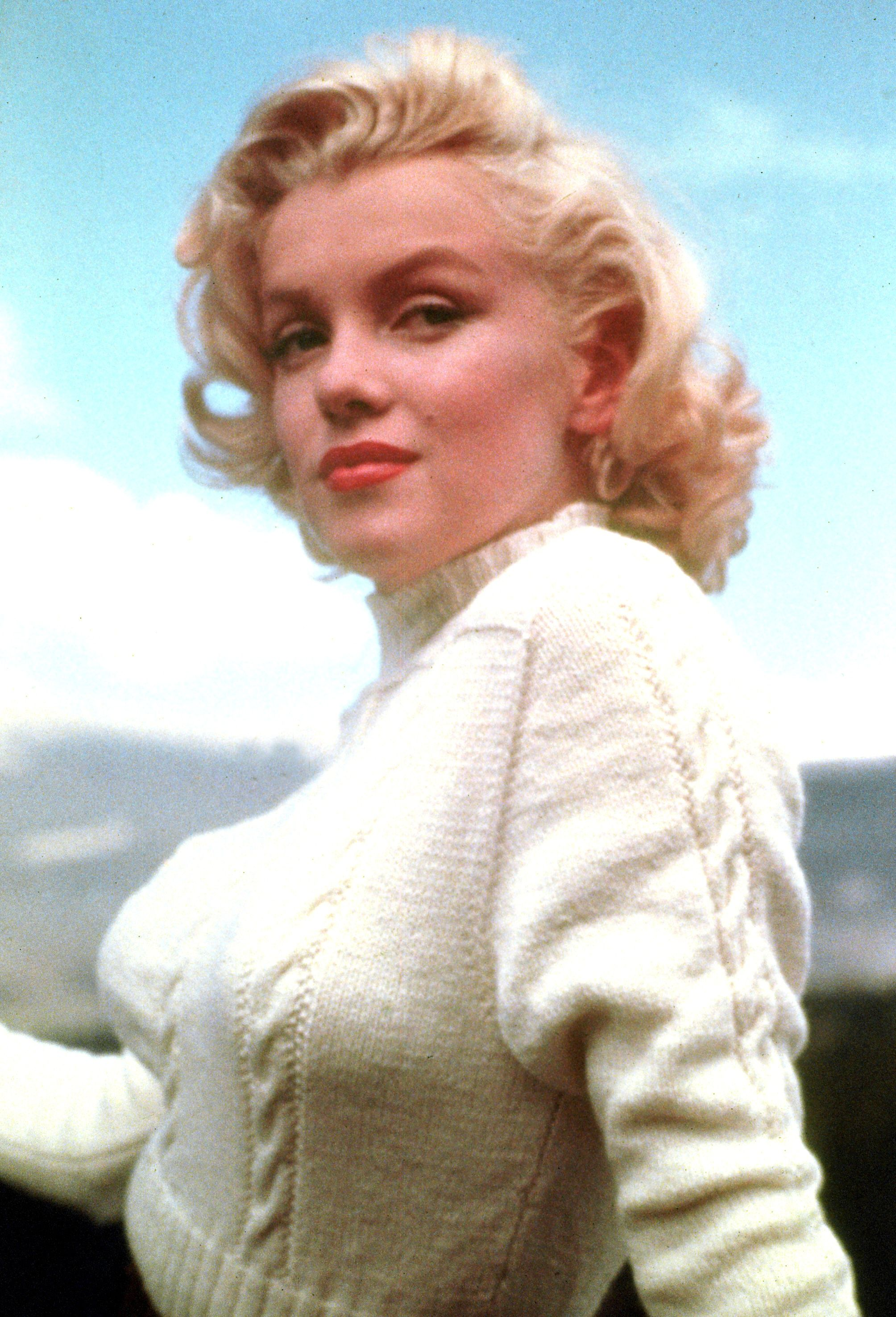
- Monroe in 1953
- Born: Norma Jeane Mortenson; June 1, 1926; Los Angeles, California, U.S.
- Died: August 4, 1962 (aged 36); Los Angeles, California, U.S.
- Cause of death: Barbiturate overdose
- Resting place: Westwood Village Memorial Park Cemetery
- Other name: Norma Jeane Baker
- Occupations: Actress; model
- Years active: 1945–1962
- Works: Roles and awards
- Spouses: James Dougherty (m. 1942; div. 1946); Joe DiMaggio (m. 1954; div. 1955); Arthur Miller (m. 1956; div. 1961)
- Mother: Gladys Pearl Baker
- Relatives: Berniece Baker Miracle (half-sister)

Marilyn Monroe (/ˈmærəlɪn mənˈroʊ/ MAIR-ə-lin mən-ROH; born Norma Jeane Mortenson; June 1, 1926 – August 4, 1962) was an American actress and model. Known for playing comic "blonde bombshell" characters, she became one of the most popular sex symbols of the 1950s and early 1960s, as well as an emblem of the era's sexual revolution. She was a top-billed actress for a decade, and her films grossed $200 million (equivalent to $2 billion in 2025) by her death in 1962. Her accolades include a Golden Globe for Best Actress in Musical or Comedy and nominations for two British Academy Film Awards.

Born in Los Angeles, Monroe spent most of her childhood in foster homes and an orphanage before marrying James Dougherty at age sixteen. She was working in a factory during World War II when she met a photographer from the First Motion Picture Unit and began a successful pin-up modeling career, which led to short-lived film contracts with 20th Century Fox and Columbia Pictures. After roles as a freelancer, she began a longer contract with Fox in 1951, becoming a popular actress with roles in several comedies, including As Young as You Feel and Monkey Business, and in the dramas Clash by Night and Don't Bother to Knock. Monroe faced a scandal when it was revealed that she had posed for nude photographs prior to fame, but the story resulted in increased interest in her films.

Monroe became one of the most marketable Hollywood stars in 1953. She had leading roles in the film noir Niagara, which overtly relied on her sex appeal, and the comedies Gentlemen Prefer Blondes and How to Marry a Millionaire, which established her star image as a "dumb blonde". The same year, her nude images were used as the centerfold and cover of the first issue of Playboy. Monroe played a significant role in the creation and management of her public image, but felt disappointed when typecast and underpaid by the studio. She was briefly suspended in early 1954 for refusing a film project but returned to star in The Seven Year Itch (1955), one of the biggest box office successes of her career.

When the studio was still reluctant to change Monroe's contract, she founded her own film production company in 1954 with her friend Milton Greene. She dedicated 1955 to building the company and began studying method acting under Lee Strasberg at the Actors Studio. Later that year, Fox awarded her a new contract, which gave her more control and a larger salary. Her subsequent roles included a critically acclaimed performance in Bus Stop (1956) and her first independent production in The Prince and the Showgirl (1957), for which she received a BAFTA nomination, and won the David di Donatello Award for Best Actress. She won a Golden Globe for her role in Some Like It Hot (1959), a critical and commercial success. Her last completed film was the drama The Misfits (1961).

Monroe's troubled private life received much attention. Her marriages to retired baseball star Joe DiMaggio and to playwright Arthur Miller were highly publicized; both ended in divorce. On August 4, 1962, Monroe died at age 36 of a barbiturate overdose at her Los Angeles home. Her death was ruled a probable suicide. Monroe remains a pop culture icon, with the American Film Institute ranking her as the sixth-greatest female screen legend from the Golden Age of Hollywood.

== Life and career ==
=== 1926–1943: Childhood and first marriage ===
Monroe was born Norma Jeane Mortenson (Note: Monroe had her screen name made into her legal name in early 1956.) on June 1, 1926, at Los Angeles General Hospital. Her mother, Gladys Pearl Baker (née Monroe), was born in Piedras Negras, Coahuila, Mexico, into a poor American family originally from the Midwest who migrated to California at the turn of the century. At age fourteen, Gladys had married John Newton Baker, an abusive man nine years her senior. They had two children together, Robert and Berniece. Gladys successfully filed for divorce and sole custody of her two oldest in 1923, but Baker kidnapped the children soon after and moved with them to his native Kentucky. Monroe first learned about her half-sister at age twelve and met the latter for the first time in her late teens.

Following the divorce, Gladys worked as a film negative cutter at Consolidated Film Industries. In 1924, she married Martin Edward Mortensen, but the union lasted only a few months, although they did not legally divorce until four years later. Gladys named Mortensen (misspelled "Mortenson") as Monroe's father in the birth certificate, but most of Monroe's biographers agree that this was unlikely as their separation had taken place well before she became pregnant. Biographers Fred Guiles and Lois Banner suggested Monroe's father was likely Charles Stanley Gifford, Gladys's superior at RKO Studios, with whom she had an affair in 1925. This was confirmed by a comparison conducted in 2022 between Monroe's DNA and that of one of Gifford's descendants.

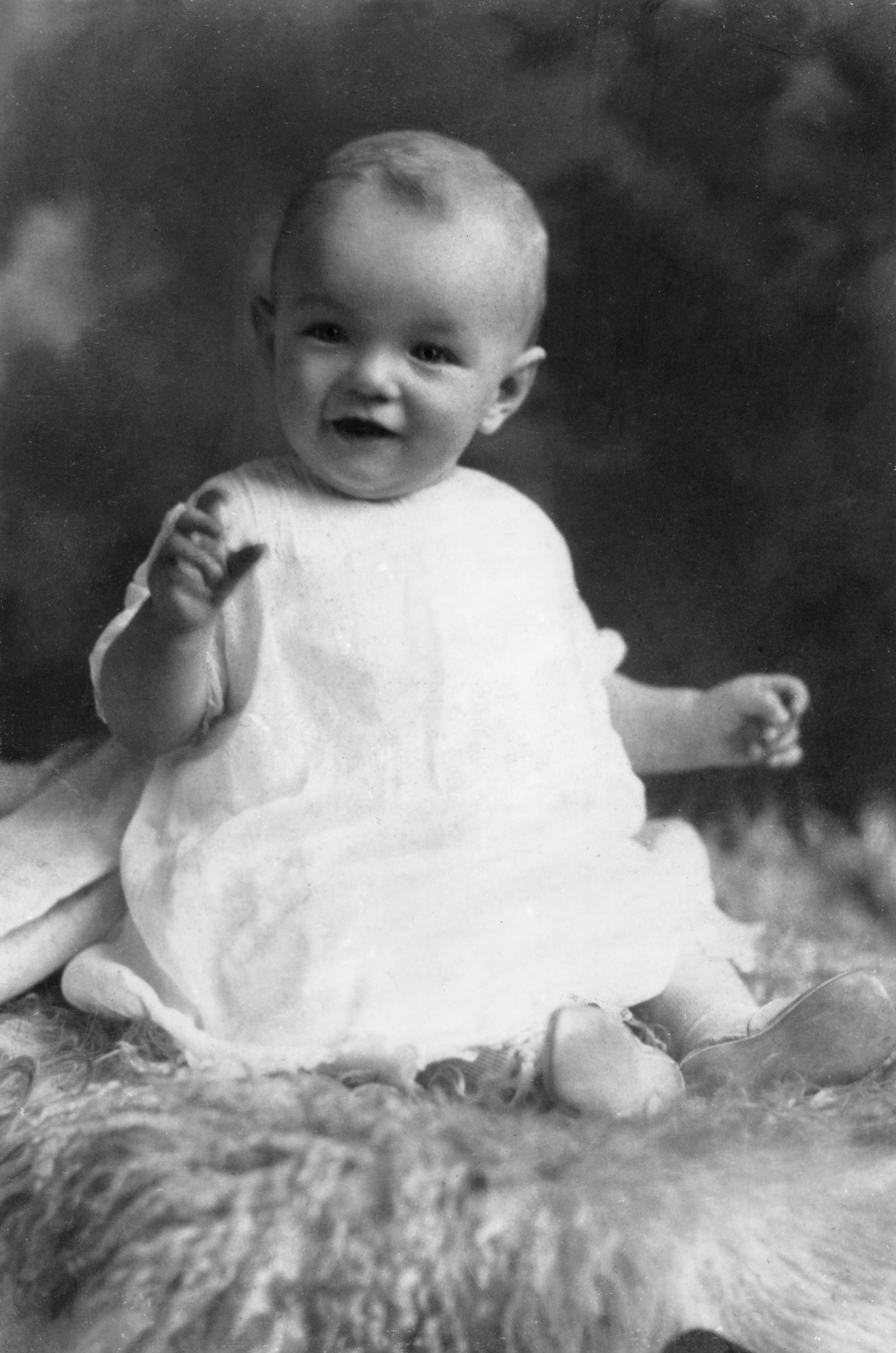
Monroe as an infant, c. 1927

Although Gladys was mentally and financially unprepared for a child, Monroe's early childhood was stable and happy. Gladys placed Monroe with evangelical Christian foster parents Albert and Ida Bolender in the suburban town of Hawthorne, California. Gladys also lived there for six months until she was forced to move back to the city for employment. Gladys then began visiting Monroe on weekends. In the summer of 1933, Gladys bought a small house in Hollywood with a loan from the Home Owners' Loan Corporation and moved Monroe in with her. They shared the house with lodgers, actors George and Maude Atkinson, and their daughter, Nellie. In January 1934, Gladys had a mental breakdown and was diagnosed with paranoid schizophrenia. After several months in a rest home, she was committed to the Metropolitan State Hospital. She spent the rest of her life in and out of hospitals and was rarely in contact with Monroe. Monroe became a ward of the state; Gladys's friend Grace Goddard took responsibility over the affairs of the former and Monroe.

For the next sixteen months, Monroe continued living with the Atkinsons and may have been sexually abused during this time. (Note: Monroe spoke about being sexually abused by a lodger when she was eight years old to her biographers Ben Hecht in 1953–1954 and Maurice Zolotow in 1960, and in interviews for Paris Match and Cosmopolitan. Although she refused to name the abuser, Banner believes he was George Atkinson, as he was a lodger and fostered Monroe when she was eight years old; Banner also states that Monroe's description of the abuser fits other descriptions of Atkinson. Banner has argued that the abuse may have been a major causative factor in Monroe's mental health problems, and has also written that as the subject was taboo in mid-century United States, Monroe was unusual in daring to speak about it publicly. Spoto does not mention the incident but states that Monroe was sexually abused by Grace's husband in 1937 and by a cousin while living with a relative in 1938. Barbara Leaming repeats Monroe's account of the abuse, but earlier biographers Fred Guiles, Anthony Summers, and Carl Rollyson have doubted the incident owing to lack of evidence beyond Monroe's statements.) Always a shy girl, she developed a stutter and became withdrawn. In the summer of 1935, she briefly stayed with Grace and the latter's husband, Erwin "Doc" Goddard, and two other families. In September 1935, Grace placed Monroe in the Los Angeles Orphans Home. The orphanage was "a model institution" and was described in positive terms by her peers, but Monroe felt abandoned. Encouraged by the orphanage staff, who thought that Monroe would be happier living in a family, Grace became her legal guardian in 1936 but did not take her out of the orphanage until the summer of 1937. Monroe's second stay with the Goddards lasted only a few months because Doc allegedly molested her. She then lived for brief periods with her relatives and Grace's friends and relatives in Los Angeles and Compton.

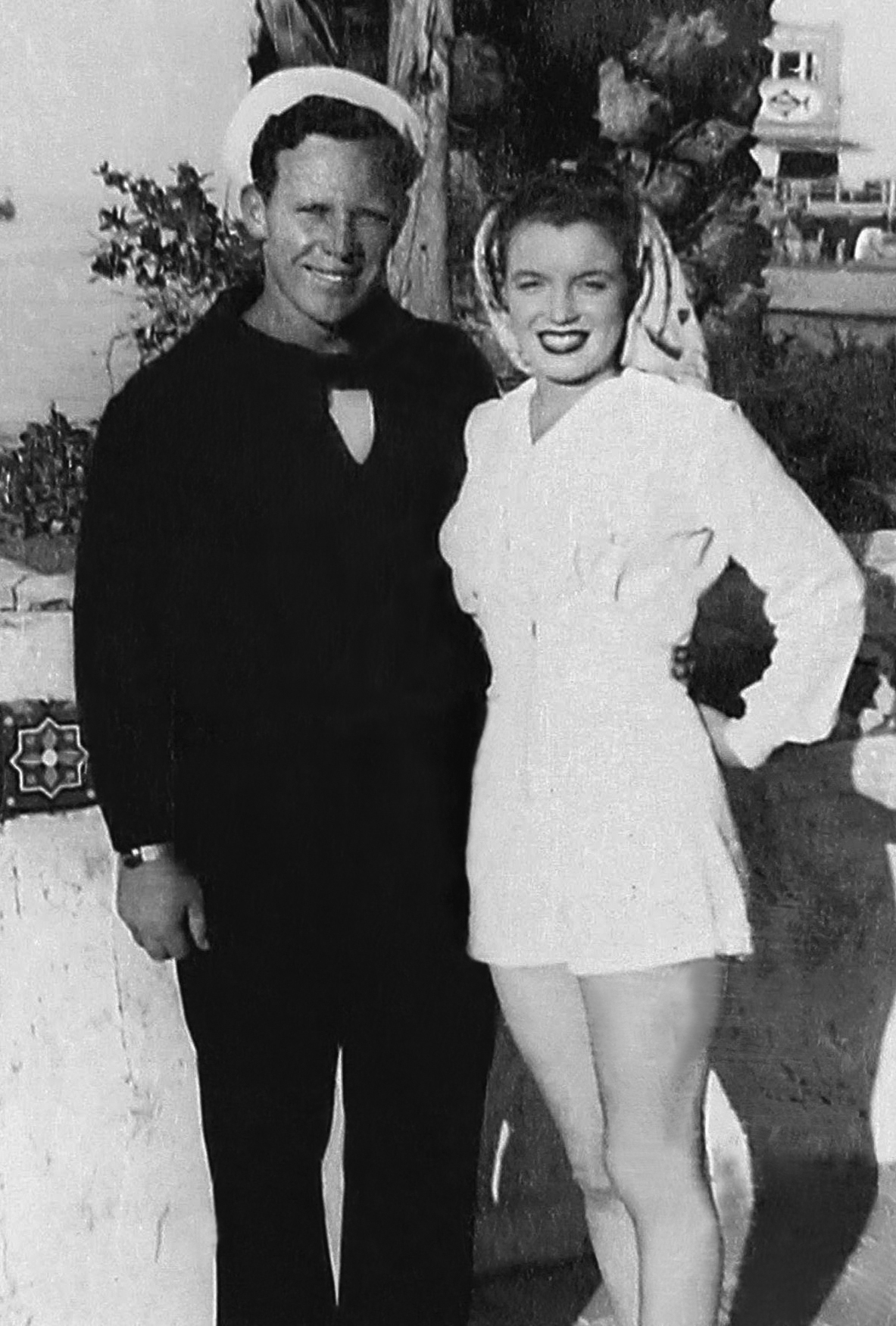
Monroe with her first husband, James Dougherty, c. 1943–44. They married when she was sixteen and divorced in 1946, when she was twenty.

Monroe's childhood experiences first made her want to become an actress:

I didn't like the world around me because it was kind of grim ... When I heard that this was acting, I said that's what I want to be ... Some of my foster families used to send me to the movies to get me out of the house and there I'd sit all day and way into the night. Up in front, there with the screen so big, a little kid all alone, and I loved it.

Monroe found a more permanent home in September 1938, when she began living with Grace's aunt Ana Lower in Sawtelle. Monroe was enrolled at Emerson Junior High School and went to weekly Christian Science services with Lower. She excelled in writing and contributed to the school newspaper, but was otherwise a mediocre student. Owing to the elderly Lower's health problems, Monroe returned to live with the Goddards in Van Nuys in about early 1941. She began attending Van Nuys High School that same year.

In 1942, the company that employed Doc relocated him to West Virginia. California child protection laws prevented the Goddards from taking Monroe out of state, and she faced having to return to the orphanage. To avoid this, it was decided that she leave high school and marry their neighbor, factory worker James Dougherty. The marriage took place just after her sixteenth birthday, on June 19, 1942. Monroe found herself and Dougherty mismatched, and later said she was "dying of boredom" during the marriage. In 1943, Dougherty enlisted in the Merchant Marine and was stationed on Santa Catalina Island, where Monroe moved with him.

=== 1944–1948: Modeling, divorce, and first film roles ===
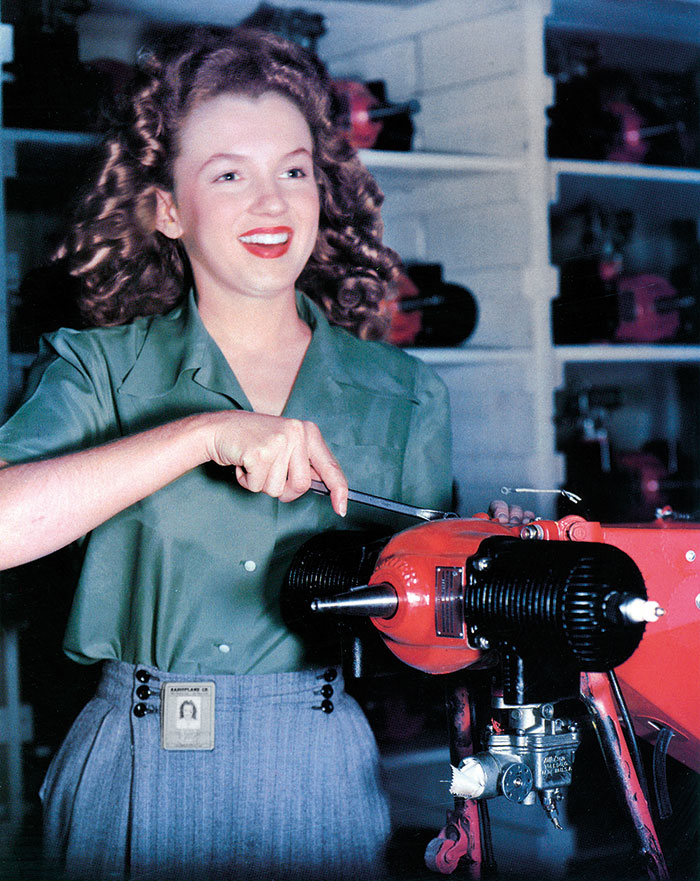
A photo of Monroe taken by David Conover in 1944 at the Radioplane Company

In April 1944, Dougherty was shipped out to the Pacific, where he remained for most of the next two years. After Dougherty left, Monroe moved in with Dougherty's parents and began a job at the Radioplane Company, a munitions factory in Van Nuys, to help the war effort. In late 1944, she met the photographer David Conover, then working in the U.S. Army Air Forces' First Motion Picture Unit, who had been sent to the factory to shoot morale-boosting pictures of female workers. Although none of her pictures were used, she quit working at the factory in January 1945 and began modeling for Conover and his friends. Defying her deployed husband and his disapproving mother, she moved on her own and signed a contract with the Blue Book Model Agency in August 1945.

The agency deemed Monroe's figure more suitable for pin-up than high fashion modeling, and she was featured mostly in advertisements and men's magazines. To improve her commercial viability for screen tests, her agency's management mandated that she chemically straighten her naturally coarse, kinky brown hair and dye it golden—and eventually platinum—blonde. According to Emmeline Snively, the agency's owner, Monroe quickly became one of its most ambitious and hard-working models; by early 1946, she had appeared on 33 magazine covers for publications such as Pageant, U.S. Camera, Laff, and Peek. As a model, Monroe occasionally used the pseudonym Jean Norman.

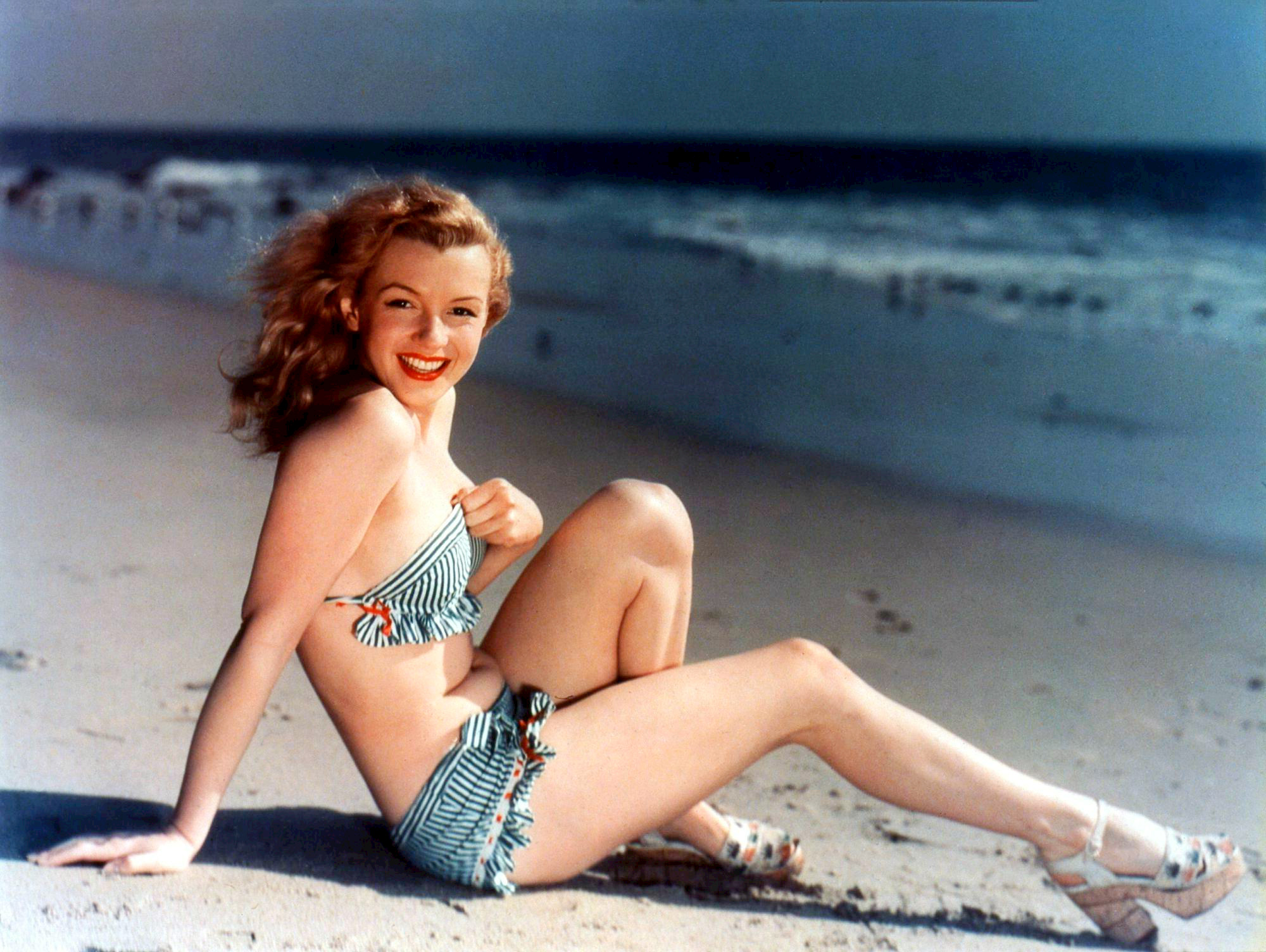
Monroe posing as a pin-up model for a postcard photograph, c. 1940s

Through Snively, Monroe signed a contract with an acting agency in June 1946. After an unsuccessful interview at Paramount Pictures, she was given a screen-test by Ben Lyon, a 20th Century-Fox executive. The head executive, Darryl F. Zanuck, was unenthusiastic about it, but he gave her a standard six-month contract to avoid her being signed by rival studio RKO Pictures. (Note: RKO's owner Howard Hughes had expressed an interest in Monroe after seeing her on a magazine cover.) Monroe's contract began in August 1946, and she and Lyon selected the stage name "Marilyn Monroe". The first name was picked by Lyon, who was reminded of Broadway star Marilyn Miller; the surname was Monroe's mother's maiden name. In September 1946, she divorced Dougherty, who had been opposed to her career.

Monroe spent her first six months at Fox learning acting, singing, and dancing, and observing the filmmaking process. Her contract was renewed in February 1947, and she was given her first film roles, bit parts in Dangerous Years (1947) and Scudda Hoo! Scudda Hay! (1948). (Note: It has sometimes been claimed that Monroe appeared as an extra in other Fox films during this period, including Green Grass of Wyoming, The Shocking Miss Pilgrim, and You Were Meant For Me, but there is no evidence to support this.) The studio also enrolled her in the Actors' Laboratory Theatre, an acting school teaching the techniques of the Group Theatre; she later stated that it was "my first taste of what real acting in a real drama could be, and I was hooked". Despite her enthusiasm, her teachers thought her too shy and insecure to have a future in acting, and Fox did not renew her contract in August 1947. She returned to modeling while also doing occasional odd jobs at film studios, such as working as a dancing "pacer" behind the scenes to keep the leads on point at musical sets.

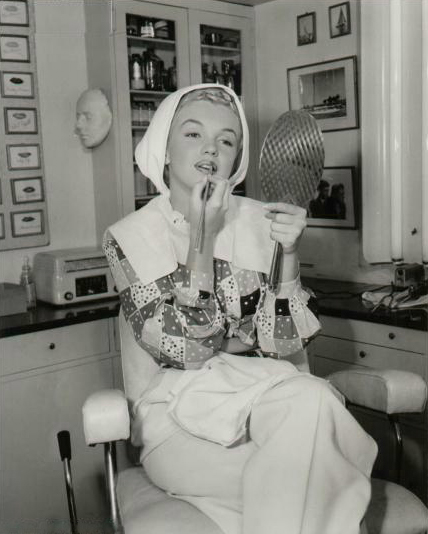
Monroe in a 1948 publicity photo for Ladies of the Chorus

Monroe was determined to make it as an actress, and continued studying at the Actors' Lab. She had a small role in the play Glamour Preferred at the Bliss-Hayden Theater, but it ended after a couple of performances. To network, she frequented producers' offices, befriended gossip columnist Sidney Skolsky, and entertained influential male guests at studio functions, a practice she had begun at Fox. She also became a friend and occasional sex partner of Fox executive Joseph M. Schenck, who persuaded his friend Harry Cohn, the head executive of Columbia Pictures, to sign her in March 1948.

At Columbia, Monroe's look was modeled after Rita Hayworth's and her hair was bleached platinum blonde. She began working with the studio's head drama coach, Natasha Lytess, who would remain her mentor until 1955. Her only film at the studio was the low-budget musical Ladies of the Chorus (1948), in which she had her first starring role as a chorus girl courted by a wealthy man. She also screen-tested for the lead role in Born Yesterday (1950), but her contract was not renewed in September 1948. Ladies of the Chorus was released the following month and was not a success.

=== 1949–1952: Breakthrough years ===
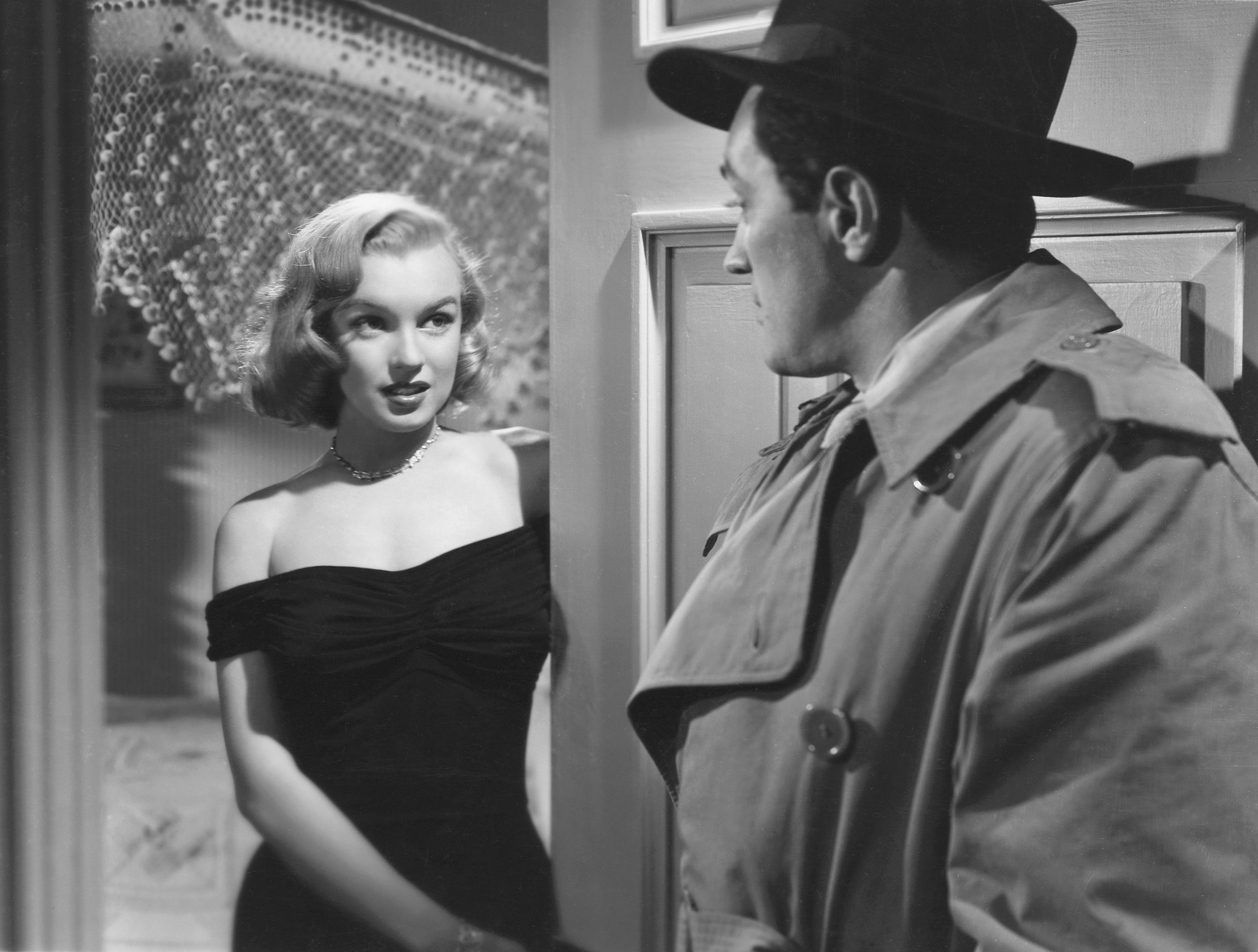
Monroe in The Asphalt Jungle (1950), one of her earliest performances to gain attention from film critics

When her contract at Columbia ended, Monroe returned again to modeling. She shot a commercial for Pabst beer and posed for artistic nude photographs by Tom Kelley for John Baumgarth calendars, using the name 'Mona Monroe'. Monroe had previously posed topless or clad in a bikini for other artists including Earl Moran, and felt comfortable with nudity. (Note: Baumgarth was initially not happy with the photos, but published one of them in 1950; Monroe was not publicly identified as the model until 1952. Although she then contained the resulting scandal by claiming she had reluctantly posed nude due to an urgent need for cash, biographers Spoto and Banner have stated that she was not pressured (although according to Banner, she was initially hesitant due to her aspirations of movie stardom) and regarded the shoot as simply another work assignment.) Shortly after leaving Columbia, she also met and became the protégée and mistress of Johnny Hyde, the vice president of the talent agency William Morris.

Through Hyde, Monroe landed small roles in several films, (Note: In addition to All About Eve and The Asphalt Jungle, Monroe's 1950 films were Love Happy, A Ticket to Tomahawk, Right Cross and The Fireball. Monroe also had a role in Home Town Story, released in 1951.) including two critically acclaimed works. The first was Joseph Mankiewicz's drama All About Eve (1950), which received 14 Academy Award nominations. The film's star Bette Davis later praised Monroe's performance, saying, "Definitely, no question, I knew she was going to make it. She was a very ambitious girl, [and] knew what she wanted [and was] very serious about it...I thought she had talent." The second film was John Huston's noir The Asphalt Jungle (1950). Despite her screen time being only a few minutes, Monroe gained a mention in Photoplay and according to biographer Donald Spoto "moved effectively from movie model to serious actress".

In December 1950, Hyde negotiated a seven-year contract for Monroe with 20th Century-Fox. According to its terms, Fox could opt not to renew the contract after each year. Hyde died of a heart attack only days later, which left Monroe devastated. In 1951, Monroe had supporting roles in three moderately successful Fox comedies: As Young as You Feel, Love Nest, and Let's Make It Legal. According to Spoto all three films featured her "essentially [as] a sexy ornament", but she received some praise from critics: Bosley Crowther of The New York Times described her as "superb" in As Young As You Feel and Ezra Goodman of the Los Angeles Daily News called her "one of the brightest up-and-coming [actresses]" for Love Nest.

Her popularity with audiences was also growing: she received several thousand fan letters a week, and was declared "Miss Cheesecake of 1951" by the army newspaper Stars and Stripes, reflecting the preferences of soldiers in the Korean War. In February 1952, the Hollywood Foreign Press Association named Monroe the "best young box office personality". In her private life, Monroe had a short relationship with director Elia Kazan and also briefly dated several other men, including director Nicholas Ray and actors Yul Brynner and Peter Lawford. In early 1952, she began a highly publicized romance with retired New York Yankees baseball star Joe DiMaggio, one of the most famous sports personalities of the era.

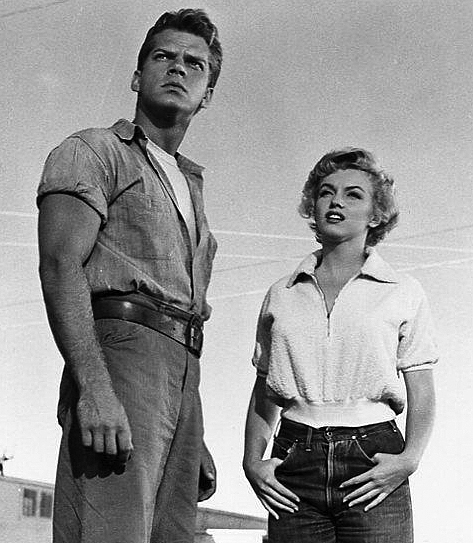
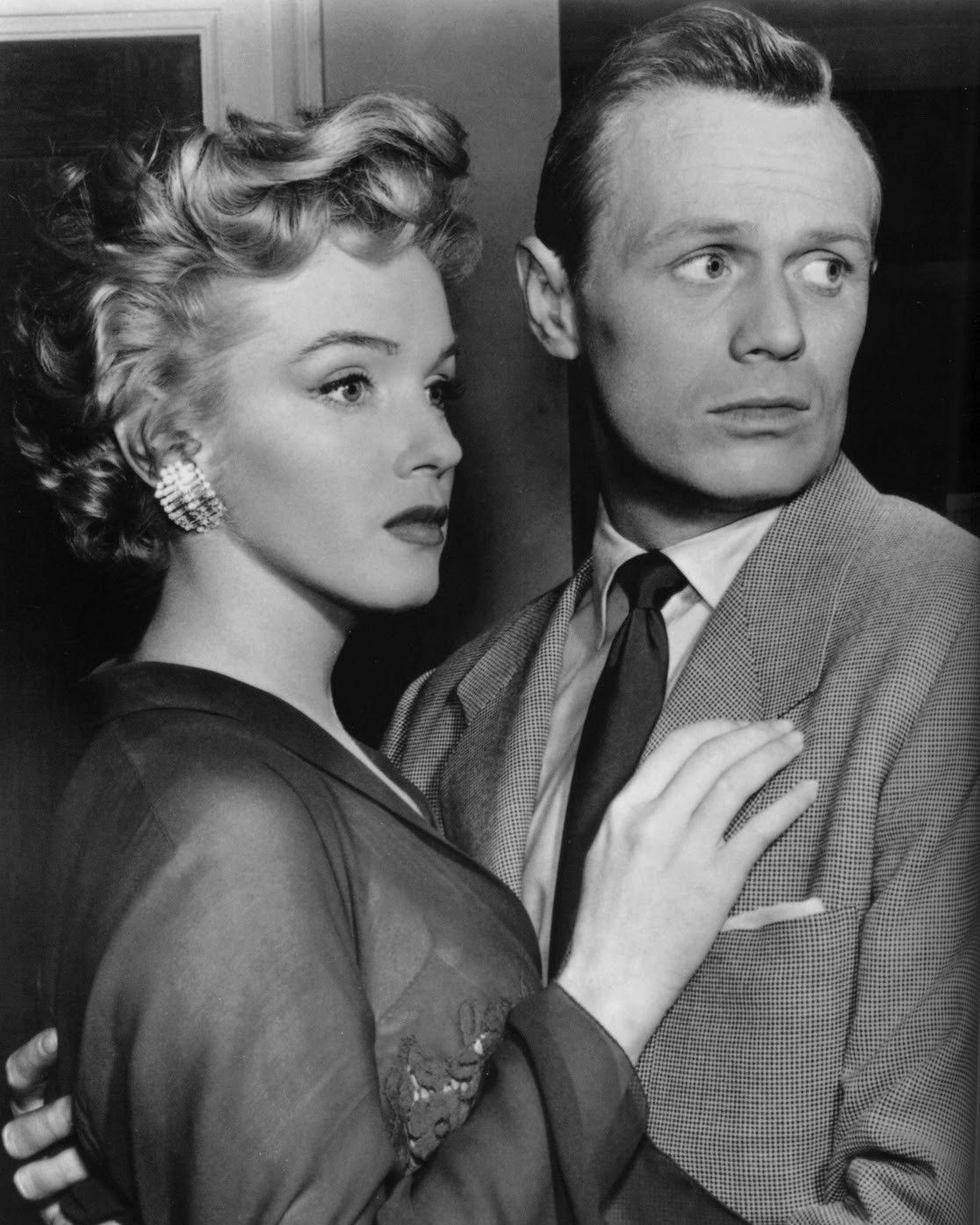
Monroe in Clash by Night (left) and Don't Bother to Knock (right), two films that showed off her dramatic range

Monroe found herself at the center of a scandal in March 1952, when she revealed publicly that she had posed for a nude calendar in 1949. The studio had learned about the photos and that she was publicly rumored to be the model some weeks prior, and together with Monroe decided that to prevent damaging her career it was best to admit to them while stressing that she had been broke at the time. The strategy gained her public sympathy and increased interest in her films, for which she was now receiving top billing. In the wake of the scandal, Monroe was featured on the cover of Life magazine as the "Talk of Hollywood", and gossip columnist Hedda Hopper declared her the "cheesecake queen" turned "box office smash". Three of Monroe's films—Clash by Night, Don't Bother to Knock and We're Not Married!—were released soon after to capitalize on the public interest.

Despite her newfound popularity as a sex symbol, Monroe also wished to showcase more of her acting range. She had begun taking acting classes with Michael Chekhov and mime Lotte Goslar soon after beginning the Fox contract, and Clash by Night and Don't Bother to Knock showed her in different roles. In the former, a drama starring Barbara Stanwyck and directed by Fritz Lang, she played a fish cannery worker; to prepare, she spent time in a fish cannery in Monterey. She received positive reviews for her performance: The Hollywood Reporter stated that "she deserves starring status with her excellent interpretation", and Variety wrote that she "has an ease of delivery which makes her a cinch for popularity". The latter was a thriller in which Monroe starred as a mentally disturbed babysitter and which Zanuck used to test her abilities in a heavier dramatic role. It received mixed reviews from critics, with Crowther deeming her too inexperienced for the difficult role, and Variety blaming the script for the film's problems.

Monroe's three other films in 1952 continued with her typecasting in comedic roles that highlighted her sex appeal. In We're Not Married!, her role as a beauty pageant contestant was created solely to "present Marilyn in two bathing suits", according to its writer Nunnally Johnson. In Howard Hawks's Monkey Business, in which she acted opposite Cary Grant, she played a secretary who is a "dumb, childish blonde, innocently unaware of the havoc her sexiness causes around her". In O. Henry's Full House, with Charles Laughton she appeared in a passing vignette as a nineteenth-century street walker. Monroe added to her reputation as a new sex symbol with publicity stunts that year: she wore a revealing dress when acting as Grand Marshal at the Miss America Pageant parade, and told gossip columnist Earl Wilson that she usually wore no underwear. By the end of the year, gossip columnist Florabel Muir named Monroe the "it girl" of 1952.

At this time, Monroe became known as difficult to work with, a reputation that grew as her career progressed. She was often late or did not show up at all, did not remember her lines, and would demand several re-takes before she was satisfied with her performance. Her dependence on her acting coaches—Natasha Lytess and then Paula Strasberg—also irritated directors. Monroe's problems have been attributed to a combination of perfectionism, low self-esteem, and stage fright. She disliked her lack of control on film sets and never experienced similar problems during photo shoots, in which she had more say over her performance and could be more spontaneous instead of following a script. To alleviate her anxiety and chronic insomnia, she began to use barbiturates, amphetamines, and alcohol, which also exacerbated her problems, although she did not become severely addicted until 1956. According to Sarah Churchwell, some of Monroe's behavior, especially later in her career, was also in response to the condescension and sexism of her male co-stars and directors. Biographer Lois Banner said that she was bullied by many of her directors.

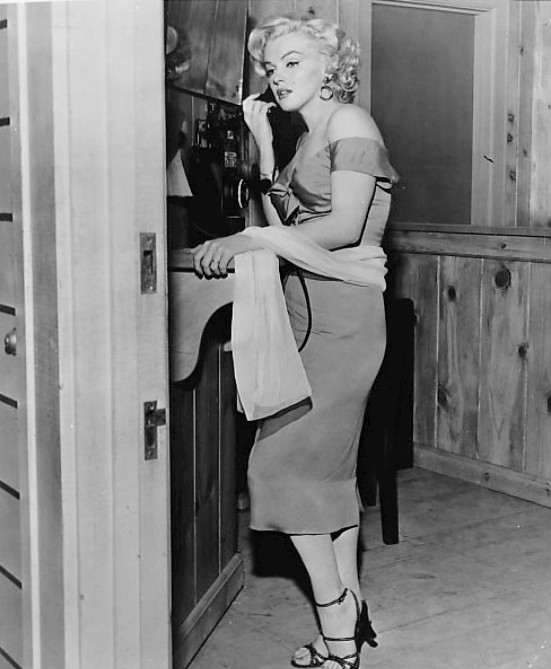
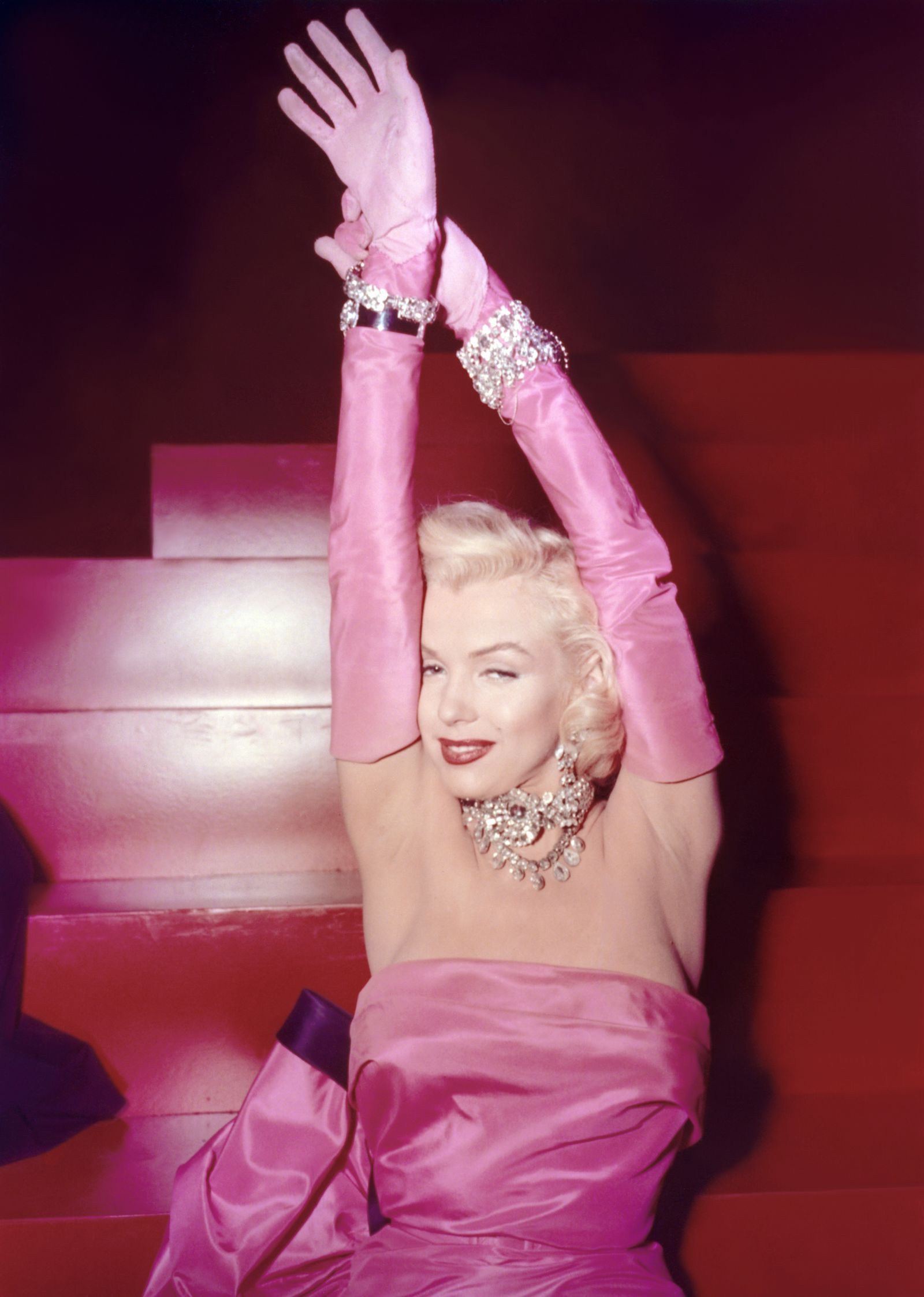
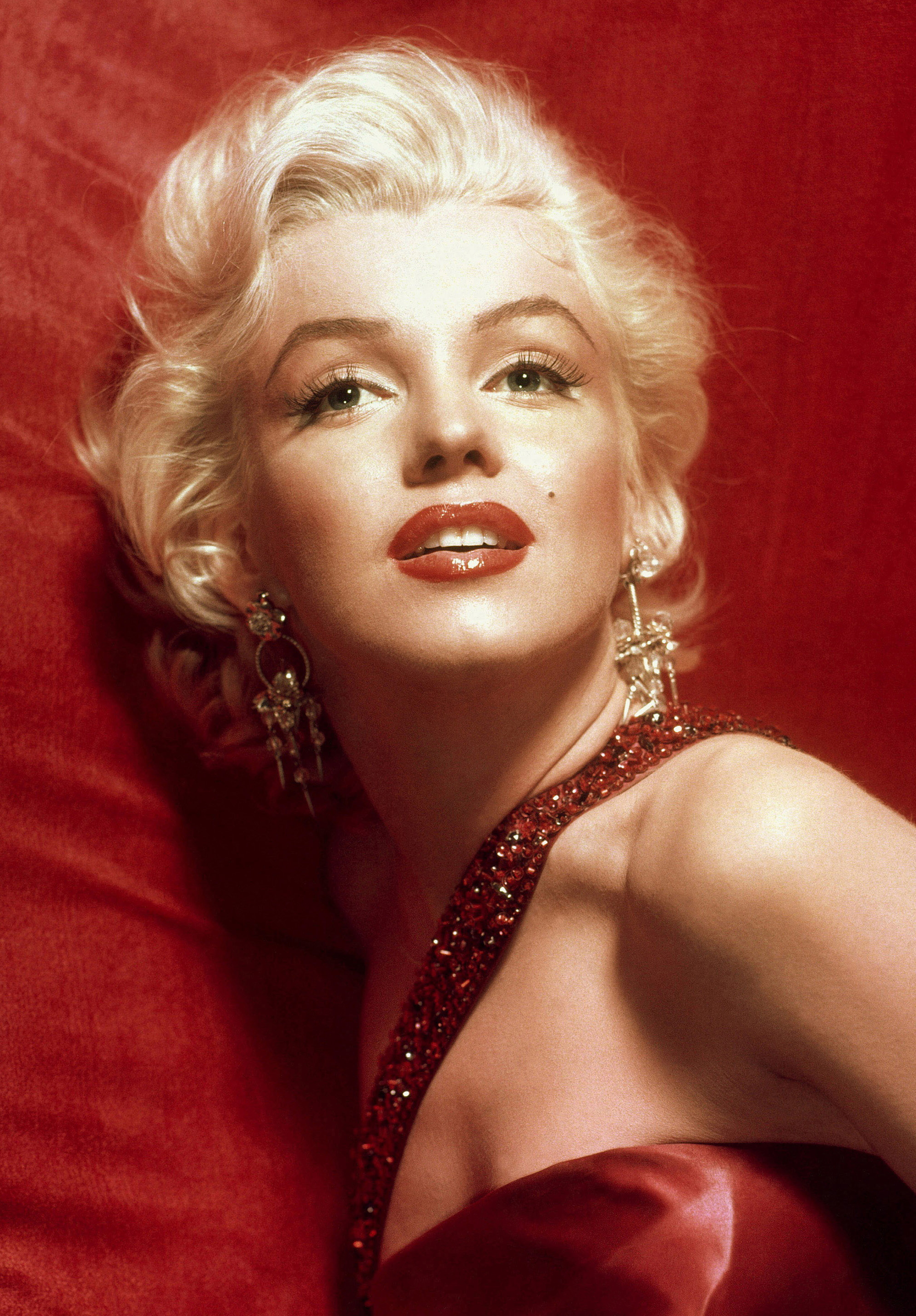
Monroe in (from top to bottom) Niagara, Gentlemen Prefer Blondes, and How to Marry a Millionaire (all 1953), which all capitalized her sex appeal and propelled her to stardom

=== 1953: Rising star ===
Monroe starred in three movies that were released in 1953 and emerged as a major sex symbol and one of Hollywood's most bankable performers. The first was the Technicolor film noir Niagara, in which she played a femme fatale scheming to murder her husband, played by Joseph Cotten. By then, Monroe and her make-up artist Allan "Whitey" Snyder had developed her "trademark" make-up look: dark arched brows, pale skin, "glistening" red lips and a beauty mark. According to Sarah Churchwell, Niagara was one of the most overtly sexual films of Monroe's career. In some scenes, Monroe's body was covered only by a sheet or a towel, considered shocking by contemporary audiences. Niagara's most famous scene is a 30-second long shot behind Monroe where she is seen walking with her hips swaying, which was used heavily in the film's marketing.

When Niagara was released in January 1953, women's clubs protested it as immoral, but it proved popular with audiences. While Variety deemed it "clichéd" and "morbid", The New York Times commented that "the falls and Miss Monroe are something to see", as although Monroe may not be "the perfect actress at this point ... she can be seductive—even when she walks". Monroe continued to attract attention by wearing revealing outfits, most famously at the Photoplay Awards in January 1953, where she won the "Fastest Rising Star" award. A pleated "sunburst" waist-tight, deep décolleté gold lamé dress designed by William Travilla for Gentlemen Prefer Blondes, but barely seen at all in the film, was to become a sensation. Prompted by such imagery, veteran star Joan Crawford publicly called the behavior "unbecoming an actress and a lady".

While Niagara made Monroe a sex symbol and established her "look", her second film of 1953, the satirical musical comedy Gentlemen Prefer Blondes, cemented her screen persona as a "dumb blonde". Based on Anita Loos' novel and its Broadway version, the film focuses on two "gold-digging" showgirls played by Monroe and Jane Russell. Monroe's role was originally intended for Betty Grable, who had been 20th Century-Fox's most popular "blonde bombshell" in the 1940s; Monroe was fast eclipsing her as a star who could appeal to both male and female audiences. As part of the film's publicity campaign, she and Russell pressed their hand and footprints in wet concrete outside Grauman's Chinese Theatre in June. Gentlemen Prefer Blondes was released shortly after and became one of the biggest box office successes of the year. Crowther of The New York Times and William Brogdon of Variety both commented favorably on Monroe, especially noting her performance of "Diamonds Are a Girl's Best Friend"; according to the latter, she demonstrated the "ability to sex a song as well as point up the eye values of a scene by her presence".

In September, Monroe made her television debut in the Jack Benny Show, playing Jack's fantasy woman in the episode "Honolulu Trip". She co-starred with Grable and Lauren Bacall in her third movie of the year, How to Marry a Millionaire, released in November. It featured Monroe as a naïve model who teams up with her friends to find rich husbands, repeating the successful formula of Gentlemen Prefer Blondes. It was the second film ever released in CinemaScope, a widescreen format that Fox hoped would draw audiences back to theaters as television was beginning to cause losses to film studios. Despite mixed reviews, the film was Monroe's biggest box office success at that point in her career.

Monroe was listed in the annual Top Ten Money Making Stars Poll in both 1953 and 1954, and according to Fox historian Aubrey Solomon became the studio's "greatest asset" alongside CinemaScope. Monroe's position as a leading sex symbol was confirmed in December 1953, when Hugh Hefner featured her on the cover and as the centerfold in the first issue of Playboy; Monroe did not consent to the publication. The cover image was a photograph taken of her at the Miss America Pageant parade in 1952, and the centerfold featured one of her 1949 nude photographs.

=== 1954–1955: Conflicts with 20th Century-Fox and marriage to Joe DiMaggio ===
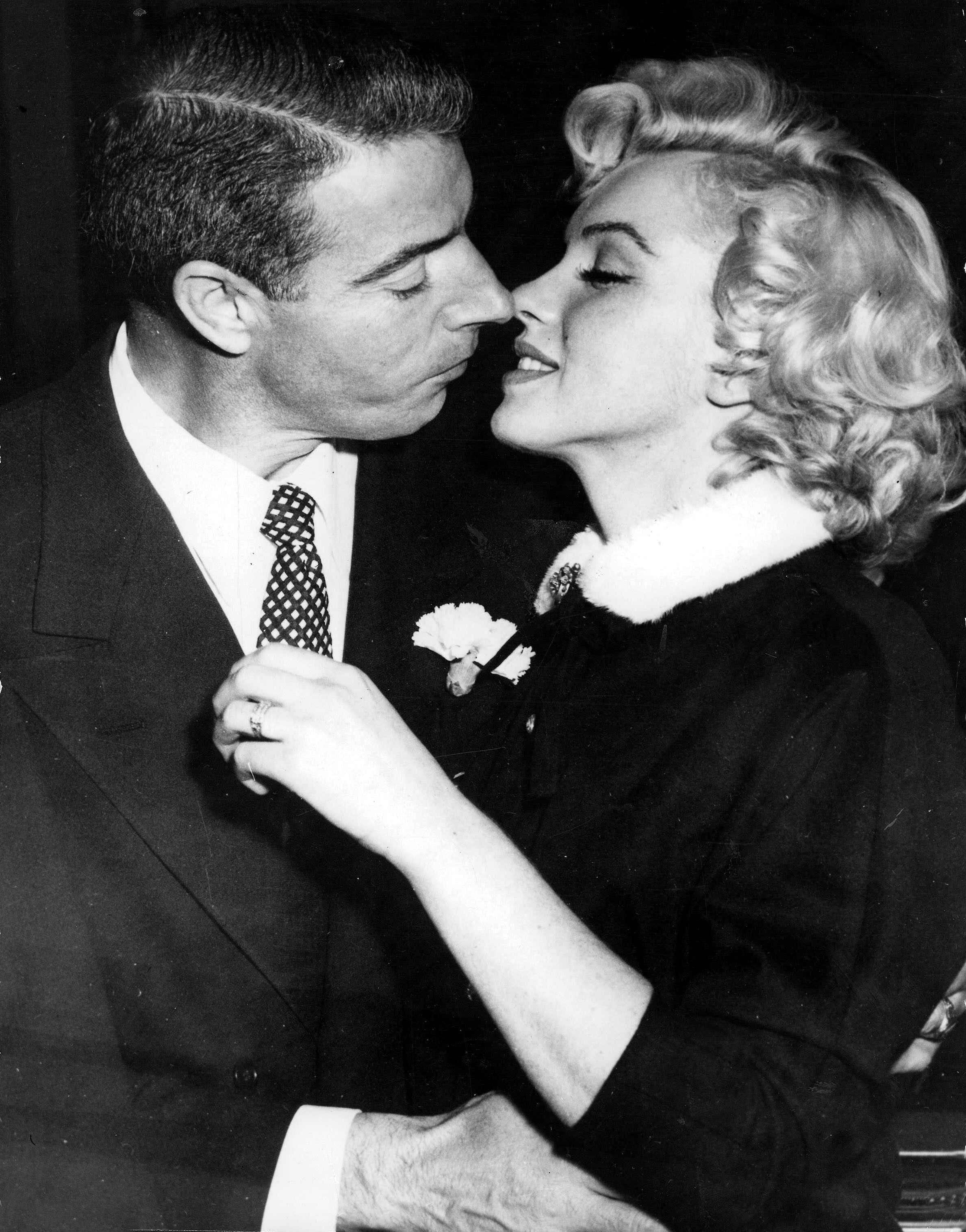
Monroe and Joe DiMaggio shortly after their wedding, January 1954

Monroe had become one of 20th Century-Fox's biggest stars, but her contract had not changed since 1950, so that she was paid far less than other stars of her stature and could not choose her projects. Her attempts to appear in films that would not focus on her as a pin-up had been thwarted by the studio head executive, Darryl F. Zanuck, who had a strong personal dislike of her and did not think she would earn the studio as much revenue in other types of roles. Under pressure from the studio's owner, Spyros Skouras, Zanuck had also decided that Fox should focus exclusively on entertainment to maximize profits and canceled the production of any "serious films". In January 1954, he suspended Monroe when she refused to begin shooting yet another musical comedy, The Girl in Pink Tights.

This was front-page news, and Monroe immediately took action to counter negative publicity. She and DiMaggio, who had been dating for two years, were married at the San Francisco City Hall on January 14, 1954. Fifteen days later, they flew to Japan, combining a "honeymoon" with his business trip. From Tokyo, she traveled to South Korea, where she participated in a USO show, singing for over 60,000 U.S. Marines over a four-day period. After returning to the U.S., she was awarded Photoplay's "Most Popular Female Star" prize. Monroe settled with Fox in March, with the promise of a new contract, a bonus of $100,000 (equivalent to $1,200,000 in 2025), and a starring role in the film adaptation of the Broadway success The Seven Year Itch.

In April 1954, Otto Preminger's western River of No Return, the last film that Monroe had filmed prior to the suspension, was released. She called it a "Z-grade cowboy movie in which the acting finished second to the scenery and the CinemaScope process", but it was popular with audiences. The first film she made after the suspension was the musical There's No Business Like Show Business, which she strongly disliked but the studio required her to do for dropping The Girl in Pink Tights. It was unsuccessful upon its release in late 1954, with Monroe's performance considered vulgar by many critics.

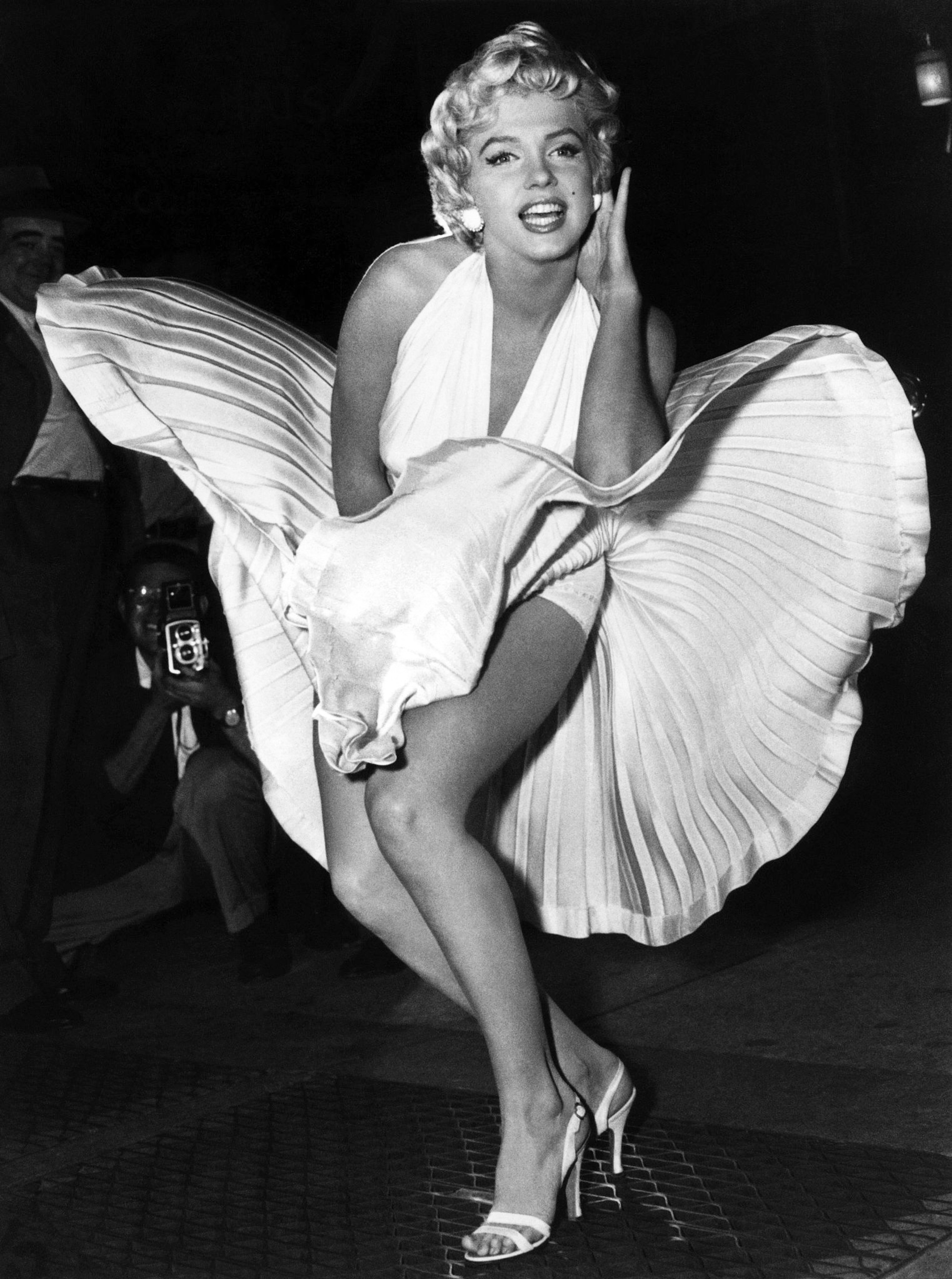
Monroe posing for photographers in The Seven Year Itch (1955) as her white dress billows around her

In September 1954, Monroe began filming Billy Wilder's comedy The Seven Year Itch, starring opposite Tom Ewell as a woman who becomes the object of her married neighbor's sexual fantasies. Although the film was shot in Hollywood, the studio decided to generate advance publicity by staging the filming of a scene in which Monroe is standing on a subway grate with the air blowing up the skirt of her white dress on Lexington Avenue in Manhattan. The shoot lasted for several hours and attracted nearly 2,000 spectators. The "subway grate scene" became one of Monroe's most famous, and The Seven Year Itch became one of the biggest commercial successes of the year after its release in June 1955.

The publicity stunt placed Monroe on international front pages, and it also marked the end of her marriage to DiMaggio. The union had been troubled from the start by his jealousy and controlling attitude; he was also physically abusive. After returning from New York City to Hollywood in October 1954, Monroe filed for divorce, after only nine months of marriage.

After filming for The Seven Year Itch wrapped up in November 1954, Monroe left Hollywood for the East Coast, where she and photographer Milton Greene founded their own production company, Marilyn Monroe Productions (MMP)—an action that has later been called "instrumental" in the collapse of the studio system. (Note: Monroe and Greene had first met and had a brief affair in 1949, and met again in 1953, when he photographed her for Look. She told him about her grievances with the studio, and Greene suggested that they start their own production company.) Monroe stated that she was "tired of the same old sex roles" and asserted that she was no longer under contract to Fox, as it had not fulfilled its duties, such as paying her the promised bonus. This began a year-long legal battle between her and Fox in January 1955. The press largely ridiculed Monroe, and she was parodied in the Broadway play Will Success Spoil Rock Hunter? (1955), in which her lookalike Jayne Mansfield played a dumb actress who starts her own production company.

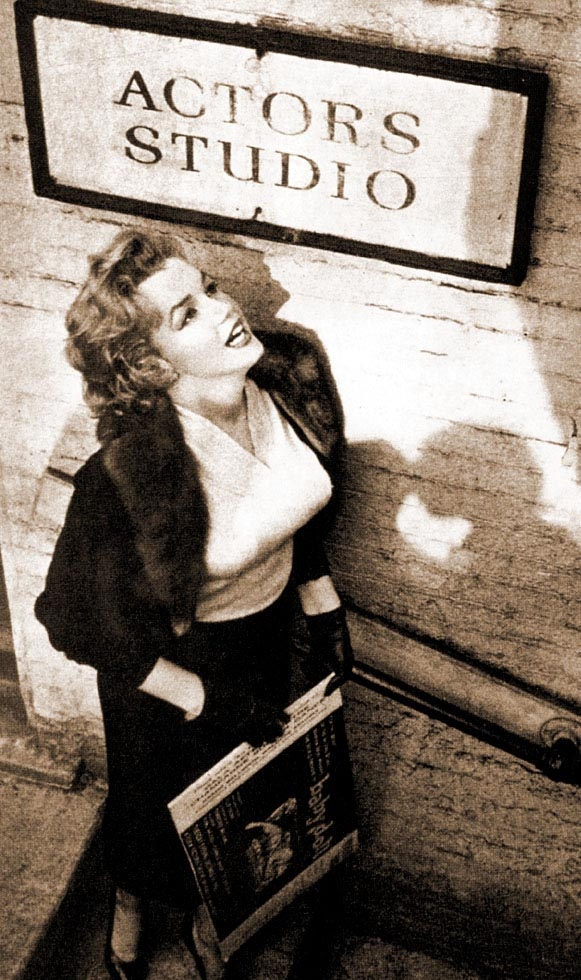
Monroe at the Actors Studio, c. 1955

After founding MMP, Monroe moved to Manhattan and spent 1955 studying acting. She took classes with Constance Collier and attended workshops on method acting at the Actors Studio, run by Lee Strasberg. She grew close to Strasberg and his wife Paula, receiving private lessons at their home due to her shyness, and soon became a family member. She replaced her old acting coach, Natasha Lytess, with Paula; the Strasbergs remained an important influence for the rest of her career. Monroe also started undergoing psychoanalysis, as Strasberg believed that an actor must confront their emotional traumas and use them in their performances. (Note: Monroe underwent psychoanalysis regularly from 1955 until her death. Her analysts were psychiatrists Margaret Hohenberg (1955–57), Anna Freud (1957), Marianne Kris (1957–61), and Ralph Greenson (1960–62).)

Monroe continued her relationship with DiMaggio despite the ongoing divorce process; she also briefly dated actor Marlon Brando. According to Brando, they maintained an intermittent relationship until she died. She began a more serious affair with playwright Arthur Miller. Their relationship became increasingly serious after October 1955, when Monroe's divorce was finalized and Miller left his wife Mary Slattery. The studio urged her to end it, as Miller was being investigated by the Federal Bureau of Investigation (FBI) for allegations of communism and had been subpoenaed by the House Un-American Activities Committee, but Monroe refused. The relationship led to the FBI opening a file on her. After years of investigation, the FBI found no evidence linking Marilyn Monroe to the Communist Party of the United States, concluding, "Subject's views are very positively and concisely leftist; however, if she is being actively used by the Communist Party, it is not general knowledge among those working with the movement in Los Angeles."

By the end of the year, Monroe and Fox signed a new seven-year contract, as MMP would not be able to finance films alone, and the studio was eager to have Monroe working for them again. Fox would pay her $400,000 (equivalent to $4,800,000 in 2025) to make four films, and granted her the right to choose her own projects, directors and cinematographers. She would also be free to make one film with MMP per each completed film for Fox.

=== 1956–1959: Critical acclaim and marriage to Arthur Miller ===
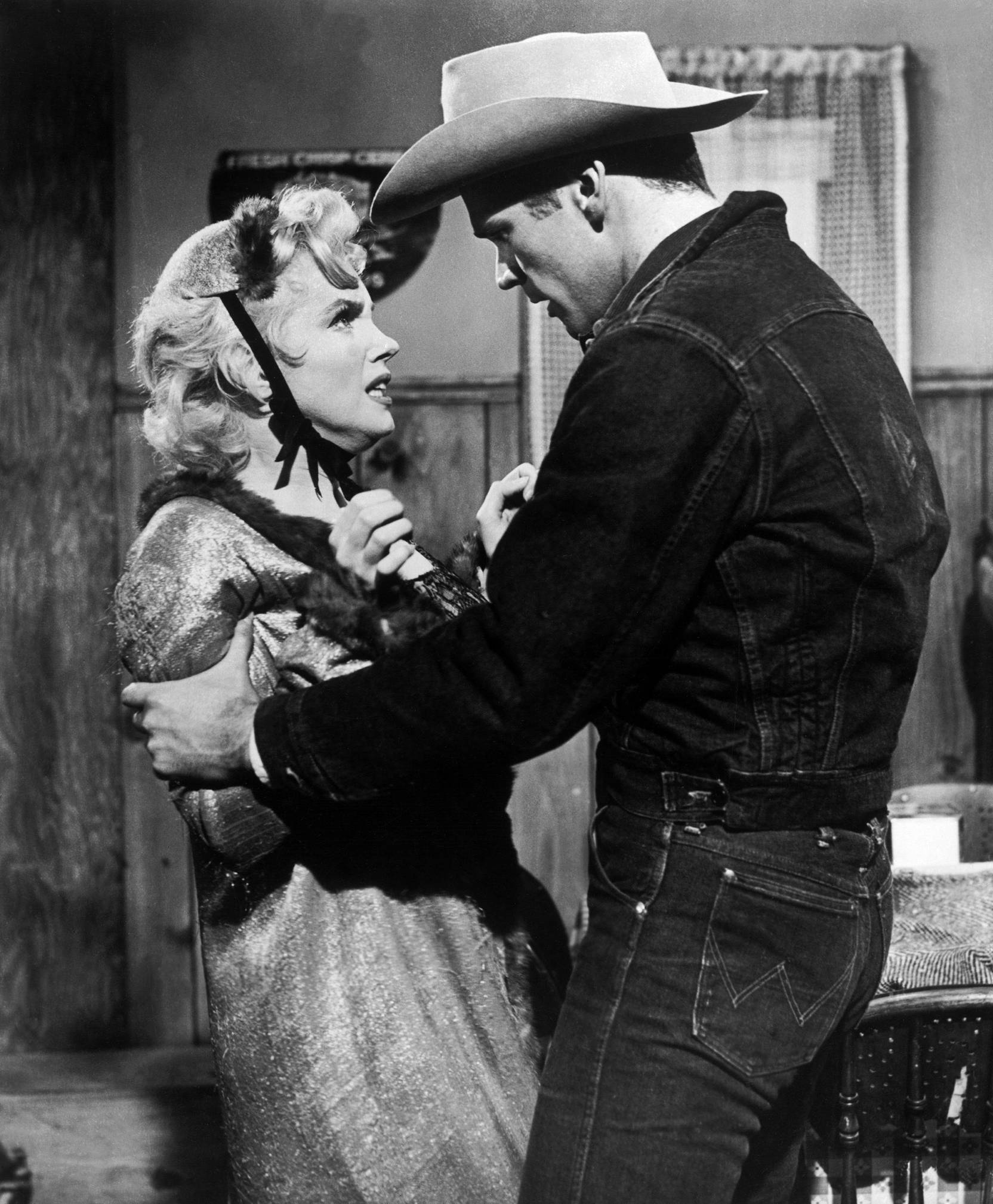
Monroe's dramatic performance in Bus Stop (1956) marked a departure from her earlier comedies.

Monroe began 1956 by announcing her win over 20th Century-Fox. On February 23, 1956, she legally changed her name to Marilyn Monroe. The press wrote favorably about her decision to fight the studio; Time called her a "shrewd businesswoman" and Look predicted that the win would be "an example of the individual against the herd for years to come". In contrast, Monroe's relationship with Miller prompted some negative comments, such as Walter Winchell's statement that "America's best-known blonde moving picture star is now the darling of the left-wing intelligentsia."

In March, Monroe began filming the drama Bus Stop, her first film under the new contract. She played a saloon singer whose dreams of stardom are complicated by a naïve cowboy who falls in love with her. For the role, she learned an Ozark accent, chose costumes and makeup that lacked the glamour of her earlier films, and provided deliberately mediocre singing and dancing. Broadway director Joshua Logan agreed to direct, despite initially doubting Monroe's acting abilities and knowing of her difficult reputation. The filming took place in Idaho and Arizona, with Monroe "technically in charge" as the head of MMP, occasionally making decisions on cinematography and with Logan adapting to her chronic lateness and perfectionism. The experience changed Logan's opinion of Monroe, and he later compared her to Charlie Chaplin in her ability to blend comedy and tragedy.

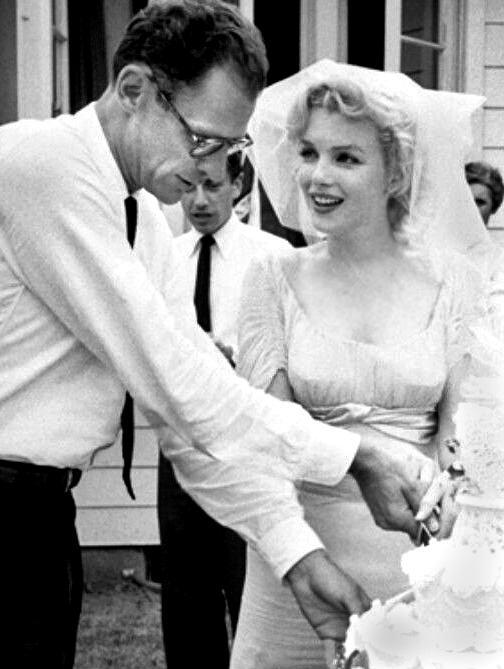
Monroe and Arthur Miller at their wedding, June 1956

On June 29, 1956, Monroe and Miller were married in a four-minute civil ceremony at the Westchester County Court in White Plains, New York; two days later they had a Jewish ceremony at the home of Kay Brown, Miller's literary agent, in Waccabuc, New York. With the marriage, Monroe converted to Judaism, which led Egypt to ban all of her films. (Note: Monroe identified with the Jewish people as a "dispossessed group" and wanted to convert to make herself part of Miller's family. She was instructed by Rabbi Robert Goldberg and converted on July 1, 1956. Monroe's interest in Judaism as a religion was limited: she called herself a "Jewish atheist" and did not practice the faith after divorcing Miller aside from retaining some religious items. Egypt also lifted her ban after the divorce was finalized in 1961.) Due to Monroe's status as a sex symbol and Miller's image as an intellectual, the media saw the union as a mismatch, as evidenced by Variety's headline, "Egghead Weds Hourglass".

Bus Stop was released in August 1956 and became a critical and commercial success. The Saturday Review of Literature wrote that Monroe's performance "effectively dispels once and for all the notion that she is merely a glamour personality" and Crowther proclaimed: "Hold on to your chairs, everybody, and get set for a rattling surprise. Marilyn Monroe has finally proved herself an actress." She also received a Golden Globe nomination for Best Actress in a Leading Role - Musical or Comedy for her performance.

In August, Monroe also began filming MMP's first independent production, The Prince and the Showgirl, at Pinewood Studios in England. Based on a 1953 stage play by Terence Rattigan, it was to be directed and co-produced by, and to co-star, Laurence Olivier. The production was complicated by conflicts between him and Monroe. Olivier, who had also directed and starred in the stage play, angered her with the patronizing statement "All you have to do is be sexy", and with his demand she replicate Vivien Leigh's stage interpretation of the character. He also disliked the constant presence of Paula Strasberg, Monroe's acting coach, on set. In retaliation, Monroe became uncooperative and began to deliberately arrive late, later saying, "if you don't respect your artists, they can't work well." Monroe also experienced other problems during the production. Her dependence on pharmaceuticals escalated and, according to Spoto, she had a miscarriage. She and Greene also argued over how MMP should be run. Despite the difficulties, filming was completed on schedule by the end of 1956. The Prince and the Showgirl was released to mixed reviews in June 1957 and proved unpopular with American audiences. It was better received in Europe, where she was awarded the Italian David di Donatello and the French Crystal Star awards and nominated for a BAFTA.

After returning from England, Monroe took an 18-month hiatus to concentrate on family life. She and Miller split their time between New York City, Connecticut and Long Island. She had an ectopic pregnancy in mid-1957, and a miscarriage a year later; these problems were most likely linked to her endometriosis. (Note: Endometriosis also caused her to experience severe menstrual pain throughout her life, necessitating a clause in her contract allowing her to be absent from work during her period; her endometriosis also required several surgeries. It has sometimes been alleged that Monroe underwent several abortions, and that unsafe abortions performed by persons without proper medical training would have contributed to her inability to maintain a pregnancy. The abortion rumors began from statements made by Amy Greene, the wife of Milton Greene, but have not been confirmed by any concrete evidence. Furthermore, Monroe's autopsy report did not note any evidence of abortions.) Monroe was also briefly hospitalized due to an overdose of barbiturates. As she and Greene could not settle their disagreements over MMP, Monroe bought his share of the company.

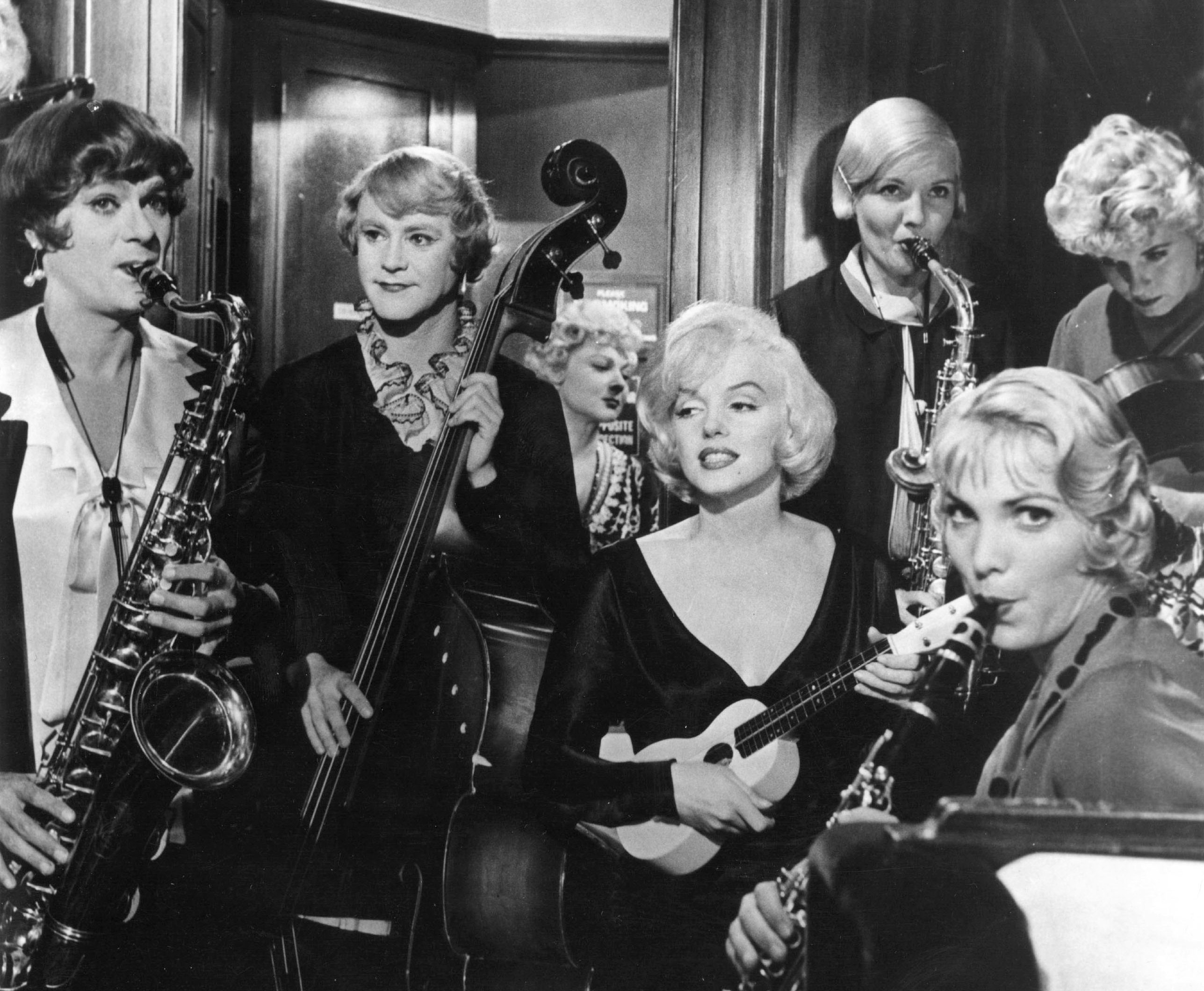
Monroe with Jack Lemmon and Tony Curtis in Some Like It Hot (1959), for which she won a Golden Globe

Monroe returned to Hollywood in July 1958 to act opposite Jack Lemmon and Tony Curtis in Billy Wilder's comedy on gender roles, Some Like It Hot. She considered the role of Sugar Kane another "dumb blonde", but accepted it due to Miller's encouragement and the offer of 10% of the film's profits on top of her standard pay. The film's difficult production has since become "legendary". Monroe demanded dozens of retakes, and did not remember her lines or act as directed—Curtis famously said that kissing her was "like kissing Hitler" due to the number of retakes. Monroe privately likened the production to a sinking ship and commented on her co-stars and director saying "[but] why should I worry, I have no phallic symbol to lose." Many of the problems stemmed from her and Wilder—who also had a reputation for being difficult—disagreeing on how she should play the role. She angered him by asking to alter many of her scenes, which in turn made her stage fright worse, and it is suggested that she deliberately ruined several scenes to act them her way.

In the end, Wilder was happy with Monroe's performance, saying: "Anyone can remember lines, but it takes a real artist to come on the set and not know her lines and yet give the performance she did!" Some Like It Hot was a critical and commercial success when it was released in March 1959. Monroe's performance earned her a Golden Globe for Best Actress in a Leading Role - Musical or Comedy, and prompted Variety to call her "a comedienne with that combination of sex appeal and timing that just can't be beat". It has been voted one of the best films ever made in polls by the BBC, the American Film Institute, and Sight & Sound.

=== 1960–1962: Career setbacks and personal difficulties ===
After Some Like It Hot, Monroe took another hiatus until late 1959, when she starred in the musical comedy Let's Make Love. She chose George Cukor to direct and Miller rewrote some of the script, which she considered weak. She accepted the part solely because she was behind on her contract with Fox. The film's production was delayed by her frequent absences from the set. During the shoot, Monroe had an affair with co-star Yves Montand that was widely reported by the press and used in the film's publicity campaign. Let's Make Love was unsuccessful upon its release in September 1960. Crowther described Monroe as appearing "rather untidy" and "lacking ... the old Monroe dynamism", and Hedda Hopper called the film "the most vulgar picture she's ever done". Truman Capote lobbied for Monroe to play Holly Golightly in a film adaptation of Breakfast at Tiffany's, but the role went to Audrey Hepburn as its producers feared that Monroe would complicate the production.

The last film Monroe completed was John Huston's The Misfits (1961), which Miller had written to provide her with a dramatic role. She played Roslyn, who has just received a quickie divorce in Reno, Nevada, and befriends three aging cowboys, played by Clark Gable, Eli Wallach and Montgomery Clift. The filming in the Nevada desert between July and November 1960 was difficult. Monroe and Miller's marriage was effectively over, and he began a relationship with on-set photographer Inge Morath. Monroe resented that he had based Roslyn partly on herself and thought the character inferior to the male roles. She also struggled with Miller's habit of rewriting scenes the night before filming. Her health was also failing: she was in pain from gallstones, and her drug addiction was so severe that her makeup usually had to be applied while she was still asleep under the influence of barbiturates. In August, filming was halted for her to spend a week in a hospital detox. Despite her problems, Huston said that when Monroe was acting, she "was not pretending to an emotion. It was the real thing. She would go deep down within herself and find it and bring it up into consciousness."

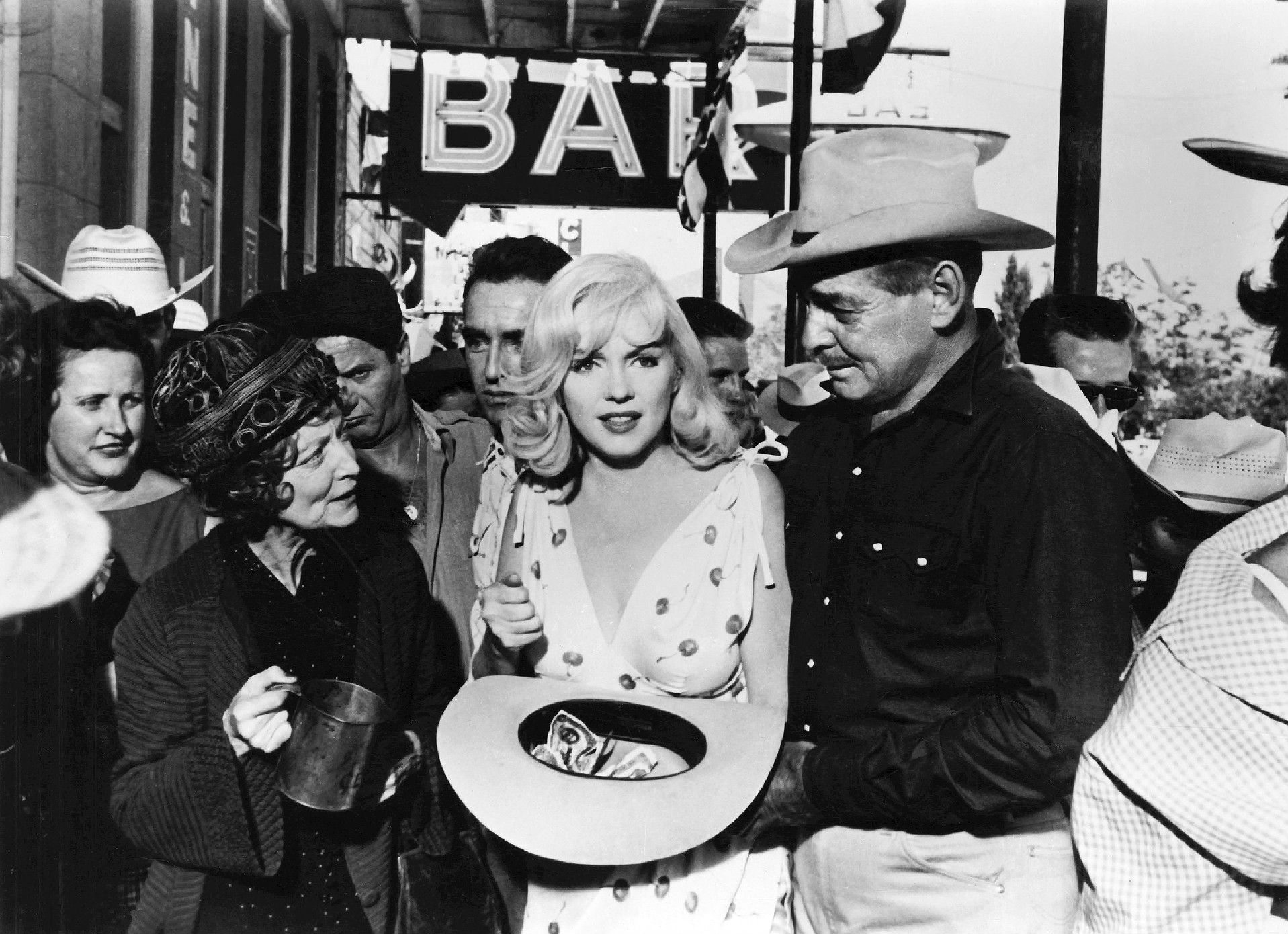
Monroe, Estelle Winwood, Eli Wallach, Montgomery Clift, and Clark Gable in The Misfits (1961). The Misfits was the final completed film for Monroe and Gable, who both died within two years.

Monroe and Miller separated after filming ended, and she obtained a Mexican divorce in January 1961. The Misfits was released the following month, failing at the box office. Its reviews were mixed, with Variety complaining of frequently "choppy" character development, and Bosley Crowther calling Monroe "completely blank and unfathomable" and writing that "unfortunately for the film's structure, everything turns upon her". It has received more favorable reviews in the 21st century. Geoff Andrew of the British Film Institute has called it a classic, Huston scholar Tony Tracy called Monroe's performance the "most mature interpretation of her career", and Geoffrey McNab of The Independent praised her "extraordinary" portrayal of the character's "power of empathy". Monroe was next to star in a television adaptation of W. Somerset Maugham's "Rain" for NBC, but the project fell through as the network did not want to hire her choice of director, Lee Strasberg. She did not film any new projects in 1961 but instead focused on her health. She had surgery for her endometriosis and gall bladder problems, and underwent four weeks of hospital treatment for depression. She first admitted herself to the Payne Whitney Psychiatric Clinic, but was erroneously placed on a ward meant for people with psychosis, where she was locked in a padded cell and not allowed to move to a more suitable ward or leave the hospital. After three days she was able to move to the more suitable Columbia University Medical Center with the help of her ex-husband Joe DiMaggio, with whom she rekindled a friendship. In later 1961, she dated Frank Sinatra for several months, and returned to live in California, where she purchased a house at 12305 Fifth Helena Drive in Brentwood, Los Angeles.

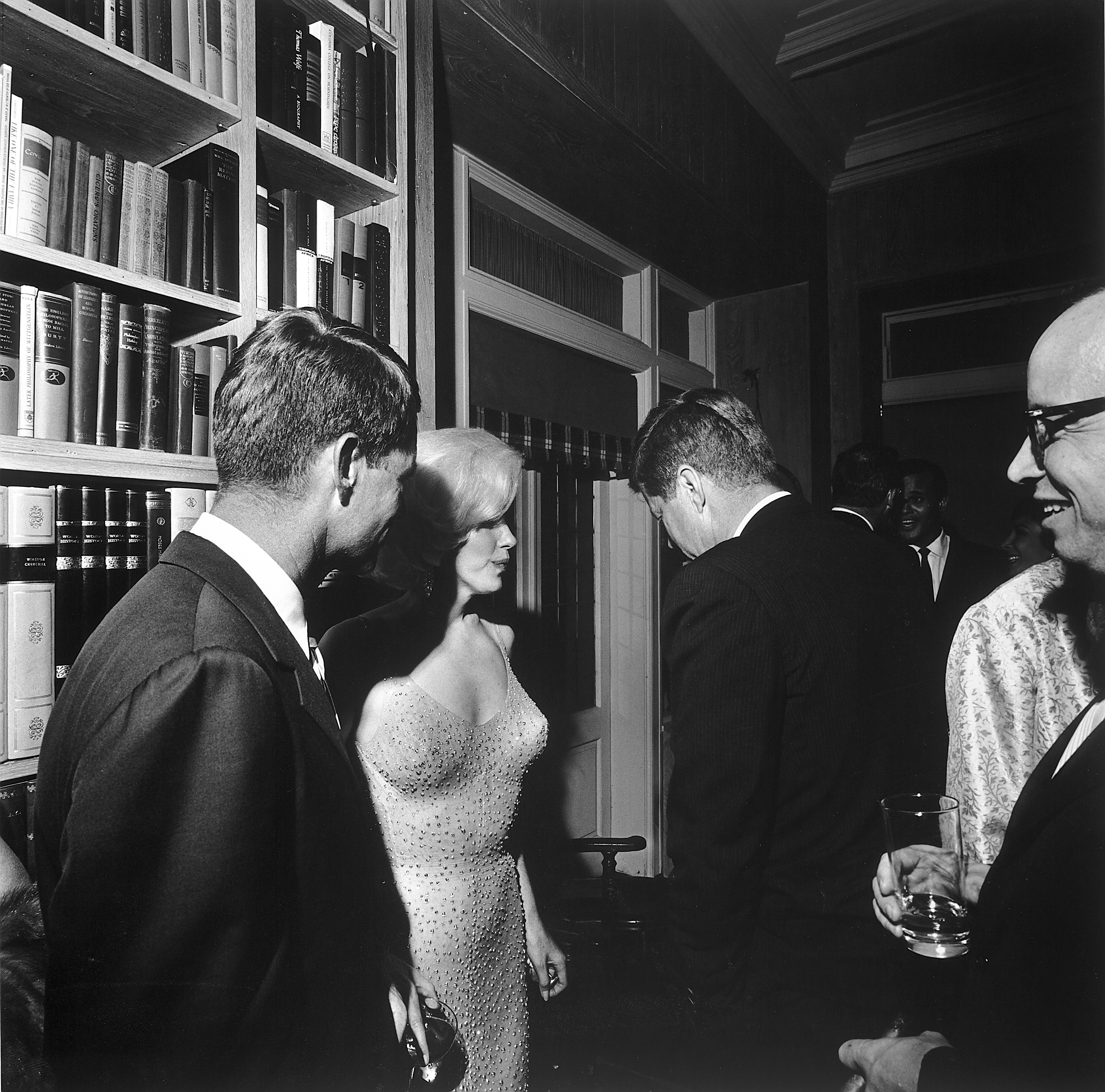
Monroe with Robert F. Kennedy (left) and John F. Kennedy (center, rear). Historians believe she likely had affairs with both men.

Monroe returned to the public eye in the spring of 1962. She received a "World Film Favorite" at the 19th Golden Globe Awards and began to shoot a film for Fox, Something's Got to Give, a remake of My Favorite Wife (1940). It was to be co-produced by MMP, directed by George Cukor and to co-star Dean Martin and Cyd Charisse. Days before filming began, Monroe caught sinusitis. Despite medical advice to postpone the production, Fox began it as planned in late April. Monroe was too sick to work for most of the next six weeks, but despite confirmations by multiple doctors, the studio pressured her by alleging publicly that she was faking it. On May 19, she took a break to sing "Happy Birthday, Mr. President" on stage at President John F. Kennedy's early birthday celebration at Madison Square Garden in New York. She drew attention with her costume: a beige, skintight dress covered in rhinestones, which made her appear as if she were nude. (Note: Monroe and Kennedy had mutual friends and were familiar with each other. Although they sometimes had casual sexual encounters, there is no evidence that their relationship was serious.) Monroe's trip to New York caused even more irritation for Fox executives, who had wanted her to cancel it.

Monroe next filmed a scene for Something's Got to Give in which she swam naked in a swimming pool. To generate advance publicity, the press was invited to take photographs; these were later published in Life. This was the first time that a major star had posed nude at the height of their career. When she was again on sick leave for several days, Fox decided that it could not afford to have another film running behind schedule when it was already struggling with the rising costs of Cleopatra (1963). On June 7, Fox fired Monroe and sued her for $750,000 in damages (equivalent to $8,000,000 in 2025). She was replaced by Lee Remick, but after Martin refused to make the film with anyone other than Monroe, Fox sued him as well and shut down the production. The studio blamed Monroe for the film's demise and began spreading negative publicity about her, even alleging that she was mentally disturbed.

Fox soon regretted its decision and reopened negotiations with Monroe later in June; a settlement about a new contract, including recommencing Something's Got to Give and a starring role in the black comedy What a Way to Go! (1964), was reached later that summer. She was also planning on starring in a biopic of Jean Harlow. To repair her public image, Monroe engaged in several publicity ventures, including interviews for Life and Cosmopolitan and her first photo shoot for Vogue. For Vogue, she and photographer Bert Stern collaborated for two series of photographs over three days, one a standard fashion editorial and another of her posing nude, which were published posthumously with the title The Last Sitting.

== Death and funeral ==
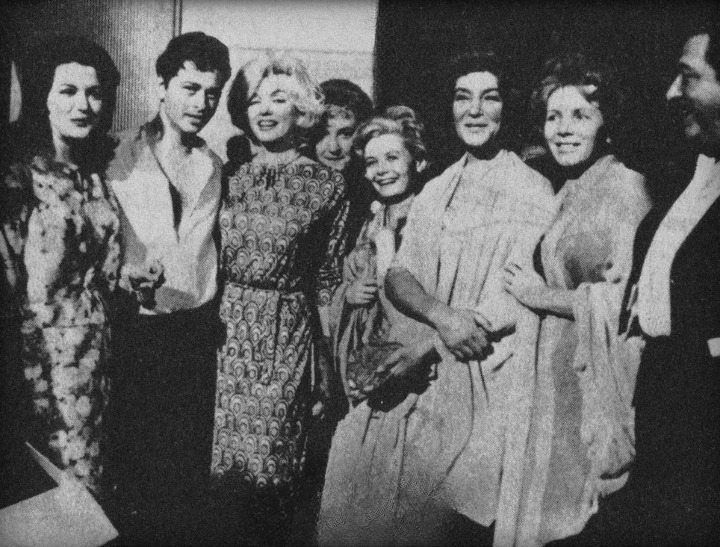
Monroe (third from left) with actors on the filming set of The Exterminating Angel during her visit to Mexico in February 1962, one of her last media appearances

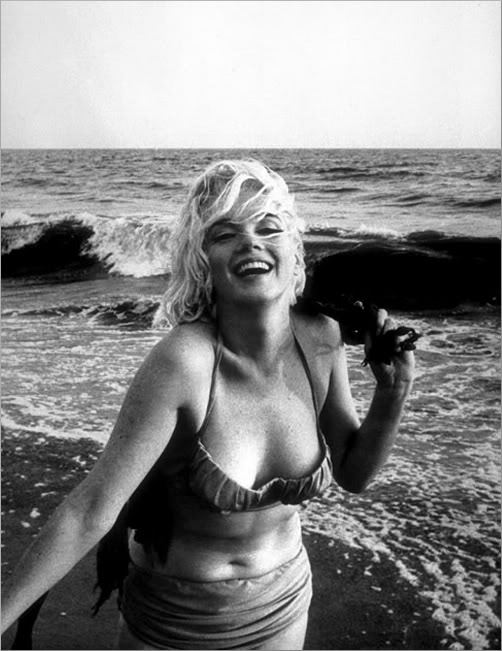
One of Monroe's last photoshoots by George Barris, 23 days before her death, July 1962

During her final months, Monroe lived at 12305 Fifth Helena Drive in the Brentwood neighborhood of Los Angeles. Her housekeeper Eunice Murray was staying overnight at the home on the evening of August 4, 1962. Murray woke at 3:00 a.m. on August 5 and sensed that something was wrong. She saw light from under Monroe's bedroom door but was unable to get a response and found the door locked. Murray then called Monroe's psychiatrist Ralph Greenson, who arrived at the house shortly after and broke into the bedroom through a window. He found a nude Monroe dead in her bed, covered by a sheet, with her hand clamped around a telephone receiver. Monroe's physician, Hyman Engelberg, arrived at around 3:50 a.m. and pronounced her dead. At 4:25 a.m., the Los Angeles Police Department was notified.

Monroe died between 8:30 p.m. and 10:30 p.m. on August 4; the toxicology report showed that the cause of death was acute barbiturate poisoning. She had 8 mg% (milligrams per 100 milliliters of solution) of chloral hydrate and 4.5 mg% of pentobarbital (Nembutal) in her blood, and 13 mg% of pentobarbital in her liver. Empty medicine bottles were found next to her bed. The possibility that Monroe had accidentally overdosed was ruled out because the dosages found in her body were several times the lethal limit.

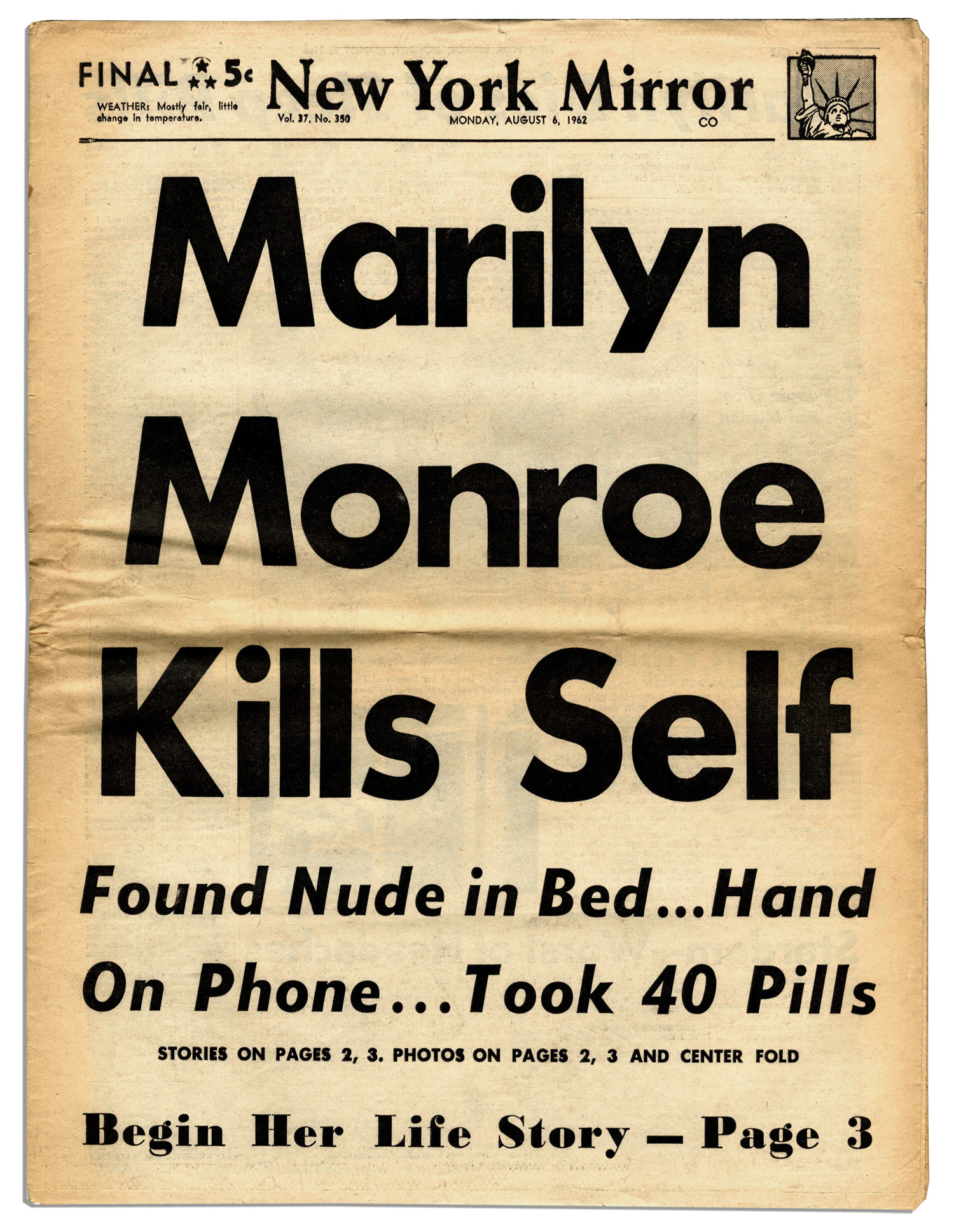
Front page of the New York Mirror on August 6, 1962

The Los Angeles County Coroners Office was assisted in their investigation by the Los Angeles Suicide Prevention Team, who had expert knowledge on suicide. Monroe's doctors stated that she had been "prone to severe fears and frequent depressions" with "abrupt and unpredictable mood changes", and had overdosed several times in the past, possibly intentionally. From these facts and the lack of any indication of foul play, deputy coroner Thomas Noguchi classified her death as a probable suicide.

Monroe's sudden death was front-page news in the United States and Europe. According to historian Lois Banner, "it's said that the suicide rate in Los Angeles doubled the month after she died; the circulation rate of most newspapers expanded that month", and the Chicago Tribune reported that they had received hundreds of phone calls from members of the public requesting information about her death. French artist Jean Cocteau commented that her death "should serve as a terrible lesson to all those whose chief occupation consists of spying on and tormenting film stars", her former co-star Laurence Olivier deemed her "the complete victim of ballyhoo and sensation", and Bus Stop director Joshua Logan said that she was "one of the most unappreciated people in the world".

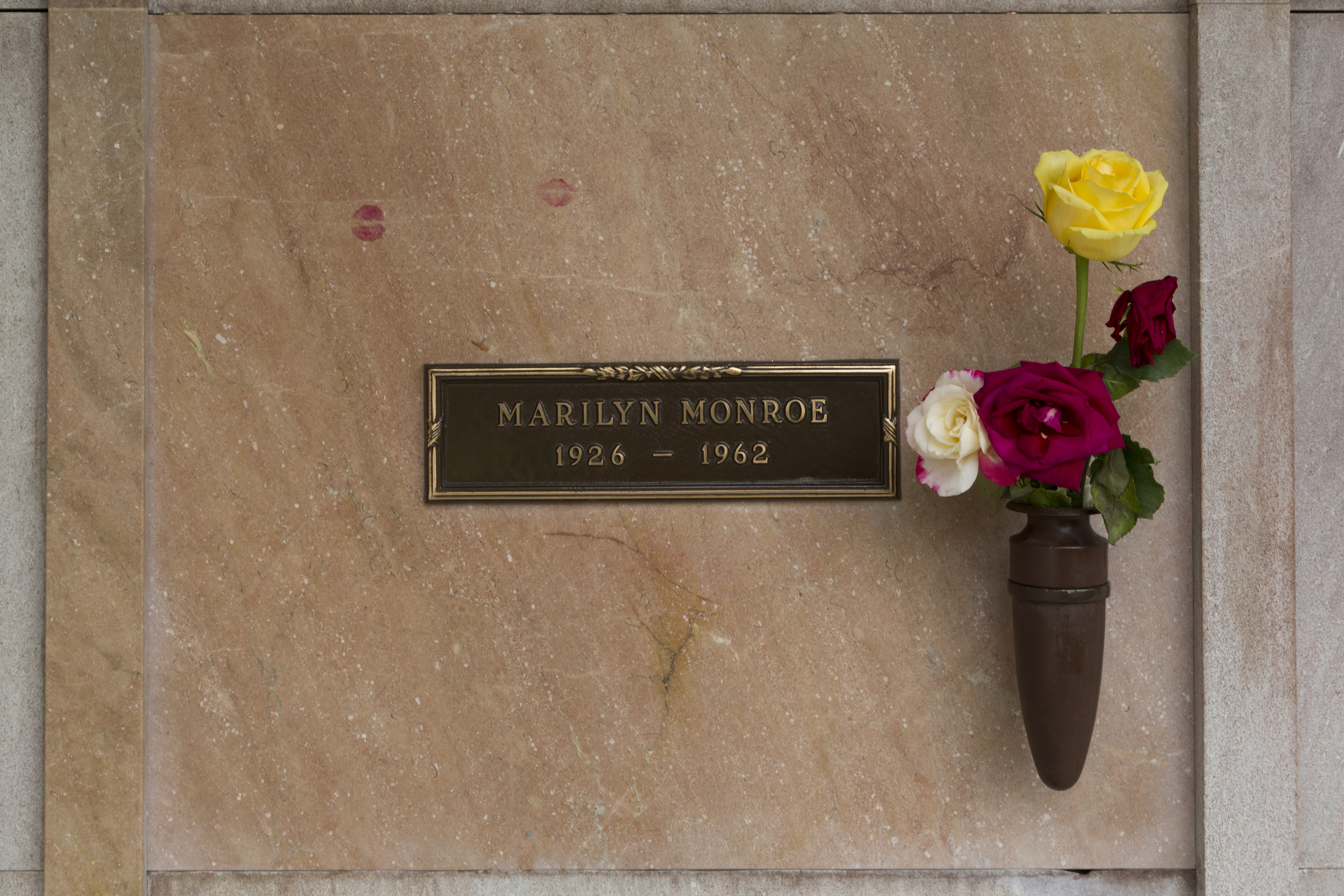
Monroe's crypt at Westwood Village Memorial Park Cemetery in Westwood Village

Monroe's funeral, held at the Westwood Village Memorial Park Cemetery on August 8, was private and attended by only her closest associates. The service was arranged by DiMaggio, Miracle, and Monroe's business manager Inez Melson. DiMaggio was the only one of her ex-husbands to attend. He barred most of Hollywood from attending and believed that they held a responsibility for her death. Hundreds of spectators crowded the streets around the cemetery. Monroe was later entombed at the Corridor of Memories.

In the following decades, several conspiracy theories, including murder and accidental overdose, have been introduced to contradict suicide as the cause of Monroe's death. The speculation that Monroe had been murdered first gained mainstream attention with the publication of Norman Mailer's Marilyn: A Biography in 1973, and in the following years became widespread enough for the Los Angeles County District Attorney John Van de Kamp to conduct a "threshold investigation" in 1982 to see whether a criminal investigation should be opened. No evidence of foul play was found.

== Screen persona and reception ==
The 1940s had been the heyday for actresses who were perceived as tough and smart—such as Katharine Hepburn and Barbara Stanwyck—who had appealed to women-dominated audiences during the war years. 20th Century-Fox wanted Monroe to be a star of the new decade who would draw men to movie theaters, and saw her as a replacement for the aging Betty Grable, their most popular "blonde bombshell" of the 1940s.

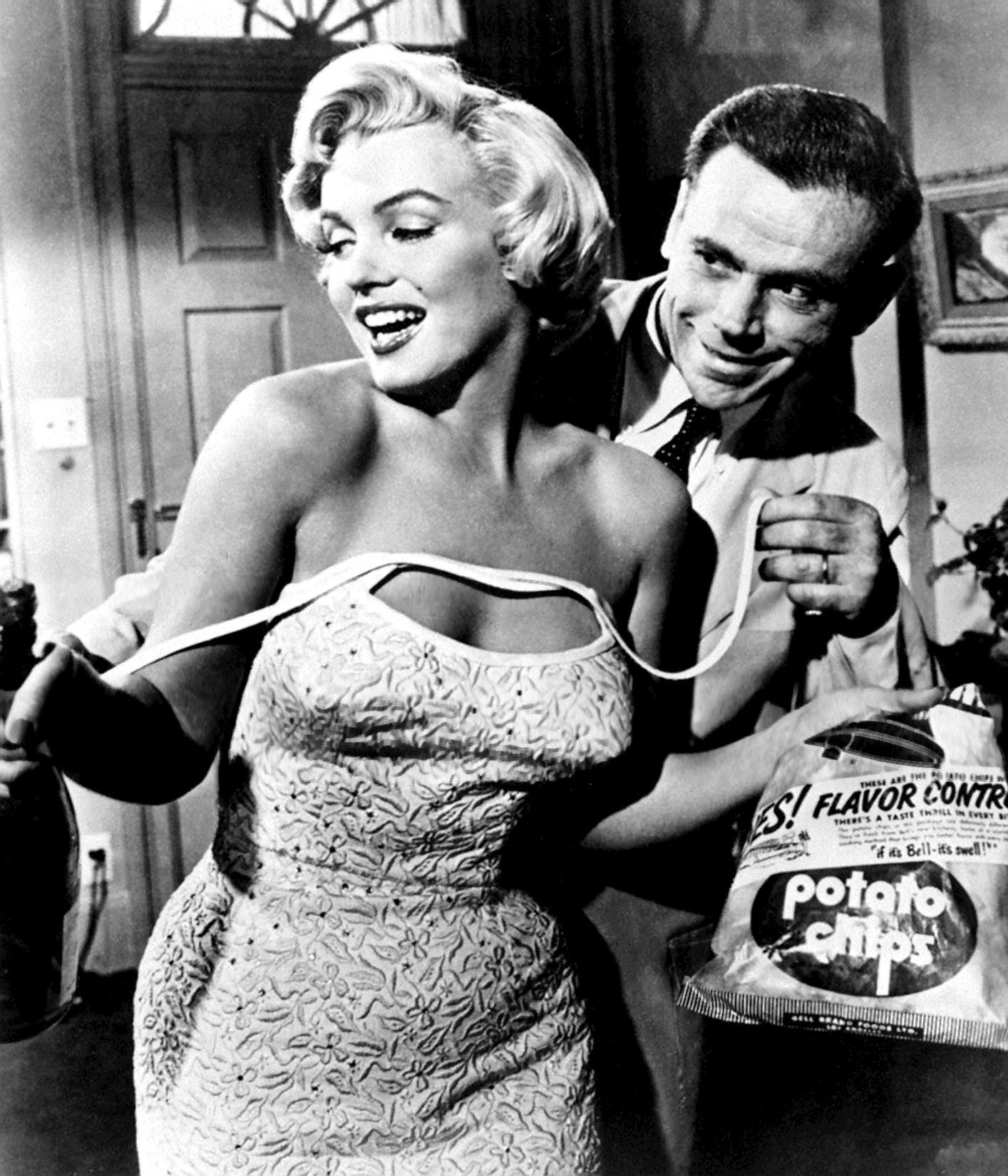
As seen in this publicity photo for The Seven Year Itch (1955), Monroe wore figure-hugging outfits that enhanced her sexual attractiveness. Tom Ewell can be seen behind Monroe.

From the beginning, Monroe played a significant part in the creation of her public image, and towards the end of her career exerted almost full control over it. She devised many of her publicity strategies, cultivated friendships with gossip columnists such as Sidney Skolsky and Louella Parsons, and controlled the use of her images. In addition to Grable, she was often compared to another well-known blonde, 1930s film star Jean Harlow. The comparison was prompted partly by Monroe, who named Harlow as her childhood idol, wanted to play her in a biopic, and even employed Harlow's hair stylist to color her hair.

Monroe's screen persona focused on her blonde hair and the stereotypes that were associated with it, especially dumbness, naïveté, sexual availability, and artificiality. She often used a breathy, childish voice in her films, and in interviews gave the impression that everything she said was "utterly innocent and uncalculated", parodying herself with double entendres that came to be known as "Monroeisms". For example, when she was asked what she had on in the 1949 nude photo shoot, she replied, "I had the radio on".

In her films, Monroe usually played "the girl", who is defined solely by her gender. Her roles were almost always chorus girls, secretaries, or models: occupations where "the woman is on show, there for the pleasure of men." Monroe began her career as a pin-up model, and was noted for her hourglass figure. She was often positioned in film scenes so that her curvy silhouette was on display, and frequently posed like a pin-up in publicity photos. Her distinctive, hip-swinging walk also drew attention to her body and earned her the nickname "the girl with the horizontal walk".

Monroe often wore white to emphasize her blondness and drew attention by wearing revealing outfits that showed off her figure. Her publicity stunts often revolved around her clothing either being shockingly revealing or even malfunctioning, such as when a shoulder strap of her dress snapped during a press conference. In press stories, Monroe was portrayed as the embodiment of the American Dream, a girl who had risen from a miserable childhood to Hollywood stardom. Stories of her time spent in foster families and an orphanage were exaggerated and even partly fabricated. Film scholar Thomas Harris wrote that her working-class roots and lack of family made her appear more sexually available, "the ideal playmate", in contrast to her contemporary, Grace Kelly, who was also marketed as an attractive blonde, but due to her upper-class background was seen as a sophisticated actress, unattainable for the majority of male viewers.

Although Monroe's screen persona as a dim-witted but sexually attractive blonde was a carefully crafted act, audiences and film critics believed it to be her real personality. This became a hindrance when she wanted to pursue other kinds of roles, or to be respected as a businesswoman. The academic Sarah Churchwell studied narratives about Monroe and wrote:

The biggest myth is that she was dumb. The second is that she was fragile. The third is that she couldn't act. She was far from dumb, although she was not formally educated, and she was very sensitive about that. But she was very smart indeed—and very tough. She had to be both to beat the Hollywood studio system in the 1950s. [...] The dumb blonde was a role—she was an actress, for heaven's sake! Such a good actress that no one now believes she was anything but what she portrayed on screen.

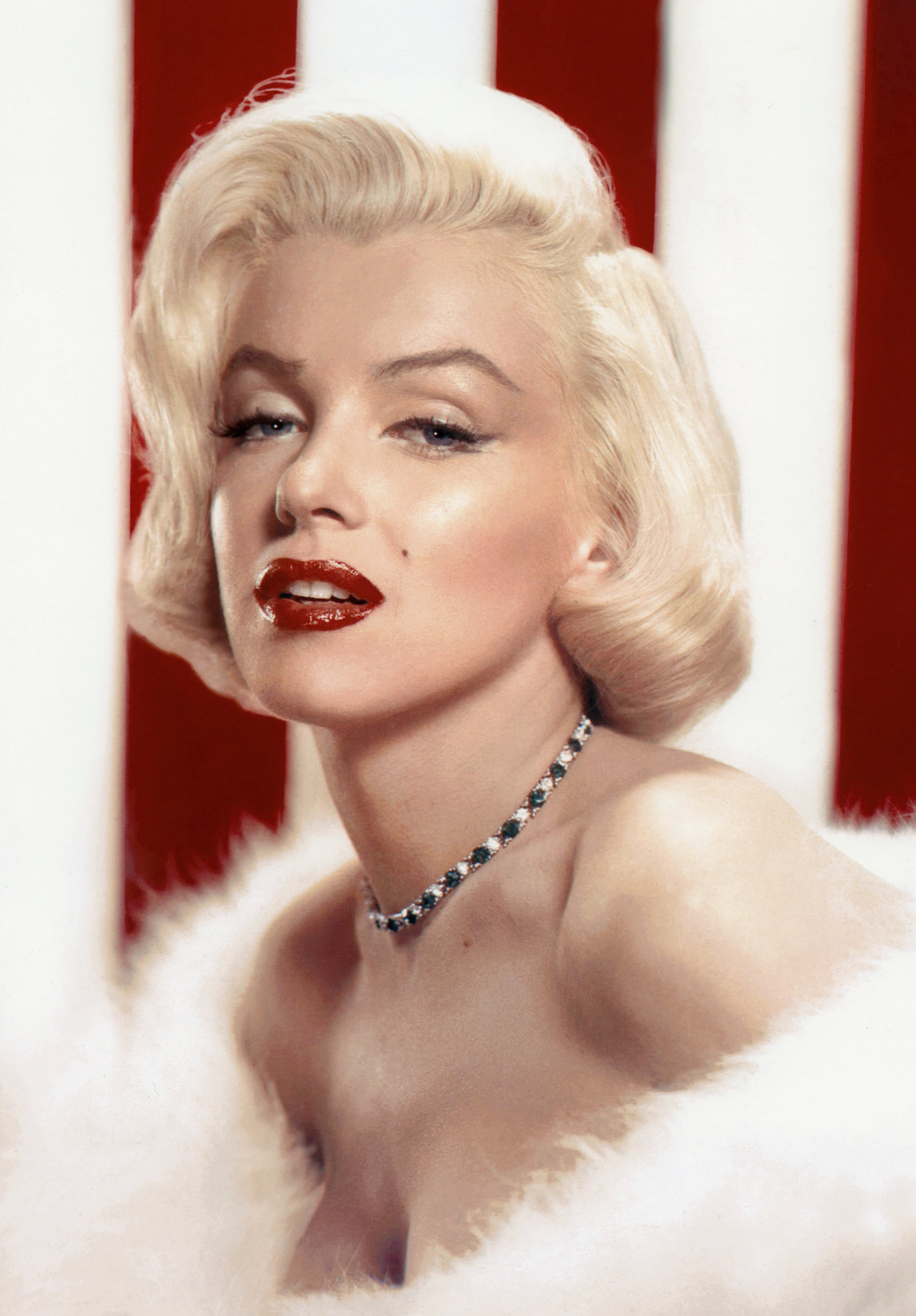
Monroe in a Photoplay magazine cover photo in December 1953

Biographer Lois Banner writes that Monroe often subtly parodied her sex symbol status in her films and public appearances, and that "the 'Marilyn Monroe' character she created was a brilliant archetype, who stands between Mae West and Madonna in the tradition of twentieth-century gender tricksters." Monroe herself stated that she was influenced by West, learning "a few tricks from her—that impression of laughing at, or mocking, her own sexuality". She studied comedy in classes by mime and dancer Lotte Goslar, famous for her comic stage performances, and Goslar also instructed her on film sets. In Gentlemen Prefer Blondes, one of the films in which she played an archetypal dumb blonde, Monroe had the sentence "I can be smart when it's important, but most men don't like it" added to her character's lines.

According to film scholar Richard Dyer, Monroe became "virtually a household name for sex" in the 1950s and "her image has to be situated in the flux of ideas about morality and sexuality that characterised the Fifties in America", such as Freudian ideas about sex, the Kinsey report (1953), and Betty Friedan's The Feminine Mystique (1963). By appearing vulnerable and unaware of her sex appeal, Monroe was the first sex symbol to present sex as natural and without danger, in contrast to the 1940s femmes fatales. Biographer Donald Spoto likewise describes her as the embodiment of "the postwar ideal of the American girl, soft, transparently needy, worshipful of men, naïve, offering sex without demands", which is echoed in Molly Haskell's statement that "she was the Fifties fiction, the lie that a woman had no sexual needs, that she is there to cater to, or enhance, a man's needs." Monroe's contemporary Norman Mailer wrote that "Marilyn suggested sex might be difficult and dangerous with others, but ice cream with her", while Groucho Marx characterized her as "Mae West, Theda Bara, and Bo Peep all rolled into one". According to Haskell, due to her sex symbol status, Monroe was less popular with women than with men, as they "couldn't identify with her and didn't support her", although this would change after her death.

Dyer has also argued that Monroe's blonde hair became her defining feature because it made her "racially unambiguous" and exclusively white just as the civil rights movement was beginning, and that she should be seen as emblematic of racism in twentieth-century popular culture. Banner agreed that it may not be a coincidence that Monroe launched a trend of platinum blonde actresses during the civil rights movement, but has also criticized Dyer, pointing out that in her highly publicized private life, Monroe associated with people who were seen as "white ethnics", such as Joe DiMaggio (Italian-American) and Arthur Miller (Jewish). According to Banner, she sometimes challenged prevailing racial norms in her publicity photographs; for example, in an image featured in Look in 1951, she was shown in revealing clothes while practicing with African-American singing coach Phil Moore. Monroe was a fan of African-American singer Ella Fitzgerald and famously helped her career when she convinced the Mocambo to book Fitzgerald by promising to attend her show.

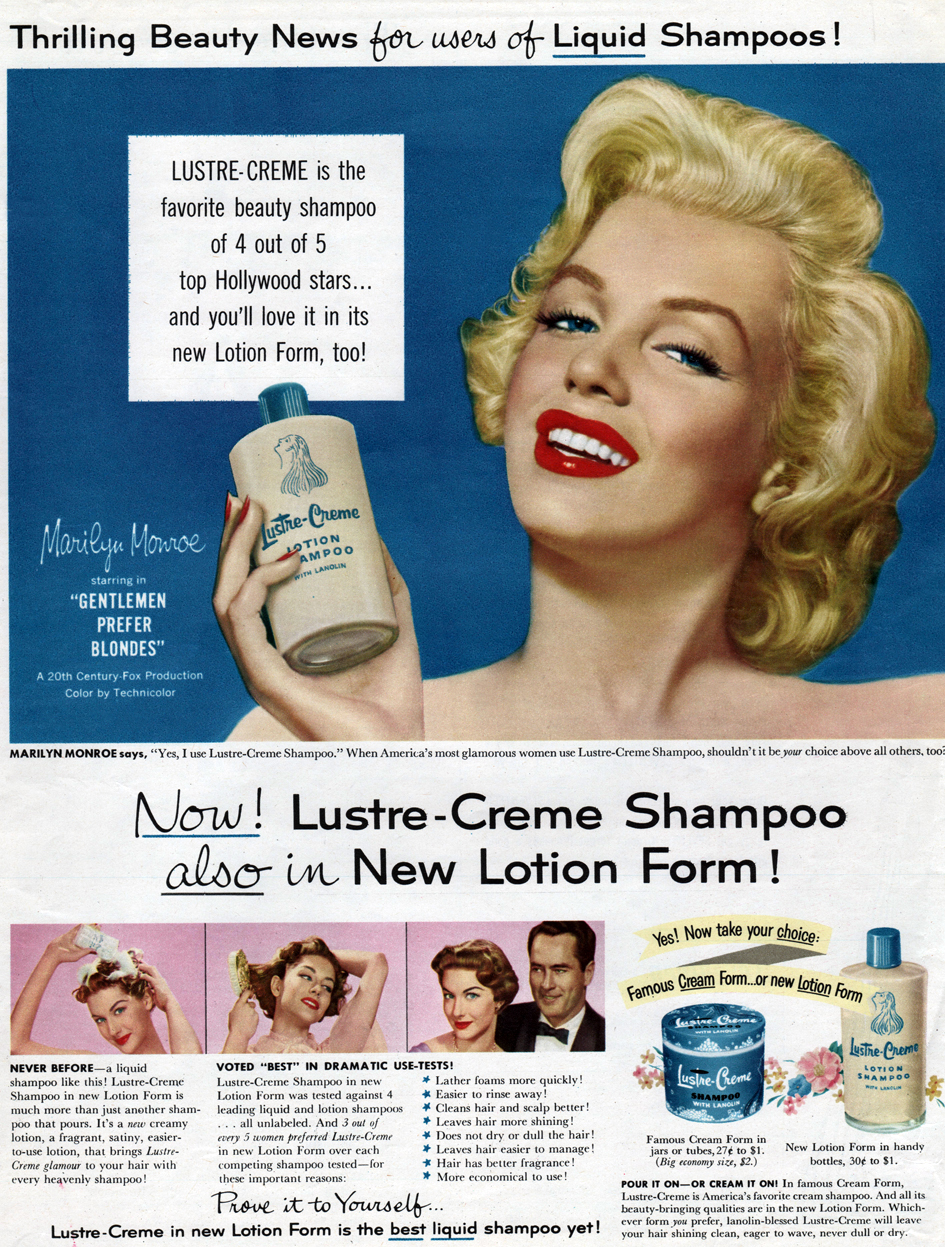
Monroe in a 1953 Lustre-Creme shampoo advertisement

Monroe was perceived as a specifically American star, "a national institution as well known as hot dogs, apple pie, or baseball" according to Photoplay. Banner calls her the symbol of populuxe, a star whose joyful and glamorous public image "helped the nation cope with its paranoia in the 1950s about the Cold War, the atom bomb, and the totalitarian communist Soviet Union". Historian Fiona Handyside writes that the French female audiences associated whiteness/blondness with American modernity and cleanliness, and so Monroe came to symbolize a modern, "liberated" woman whose life takes place in the public sphere. Film historian Laura Mulvey has written of her as an endorsement for American consumer culture:

If America was to export the democracy of glamour into post-war, impoverished Europe, the movies could be its shop window ... Marilyn Monroe, with her all American attributes and streamlined sexuality, came to epitomise in a single image this complex interface of the economic, the political, and the erotic. By the mid-1950s, she stood for a brand of classless glamour, available to anyone using American cosmetics, nylons and peroxide.

Twentieth Century-Fox further profited from Monroe's popularity by cultivating several lookalike actresses, such as Jayne Mansfield and Sheree North. Other studios also attempted to create their own Monroes: Universal Pictures with Mamie Van Doren, Columbia Pictures with Kim Novak, and The Rank Organisation with Diana Dors.

In a profile, Truman Capote quoted Monroe's acting teacher, Constance Collier:

She is a beautiful child. I don't mean that in the obvious way—the perhaps too obvious way. I don't think she's an actress at all, not in any traditional sense. What she has—this presence, this luminosity, this flickering intelligence—could never surface on the stage. It's so fragile and subtle, it can only be caught by the camera. It's like a hummingbird in flight: only a camera can freeze the poetry of it.

Monroe admired several political figures, especially Abraham Lincoln, whom she respected for his connection to ordinary people and democratic principles, even describing him as a paternal figure. Civil rights were of great importance to her; in a letter to Arthur Miller's son, she recounted questioning Robert F. Kennedy at a dinner about his department's plans regarding civil rights, emphasizing that these were the kinds of questions young Americans wanted answered and addressed. Monroe was registered as a Democrat and admired party members including John F. Kennedy, Robert F. Kennedy and William O. Douglas. She also donated $1,000 (equivalent to $11,000 in 2025) to the Democratic Party by purchasing a ticket for the "Happy Birthday, Mr. President" event.

== Selected filmography ==
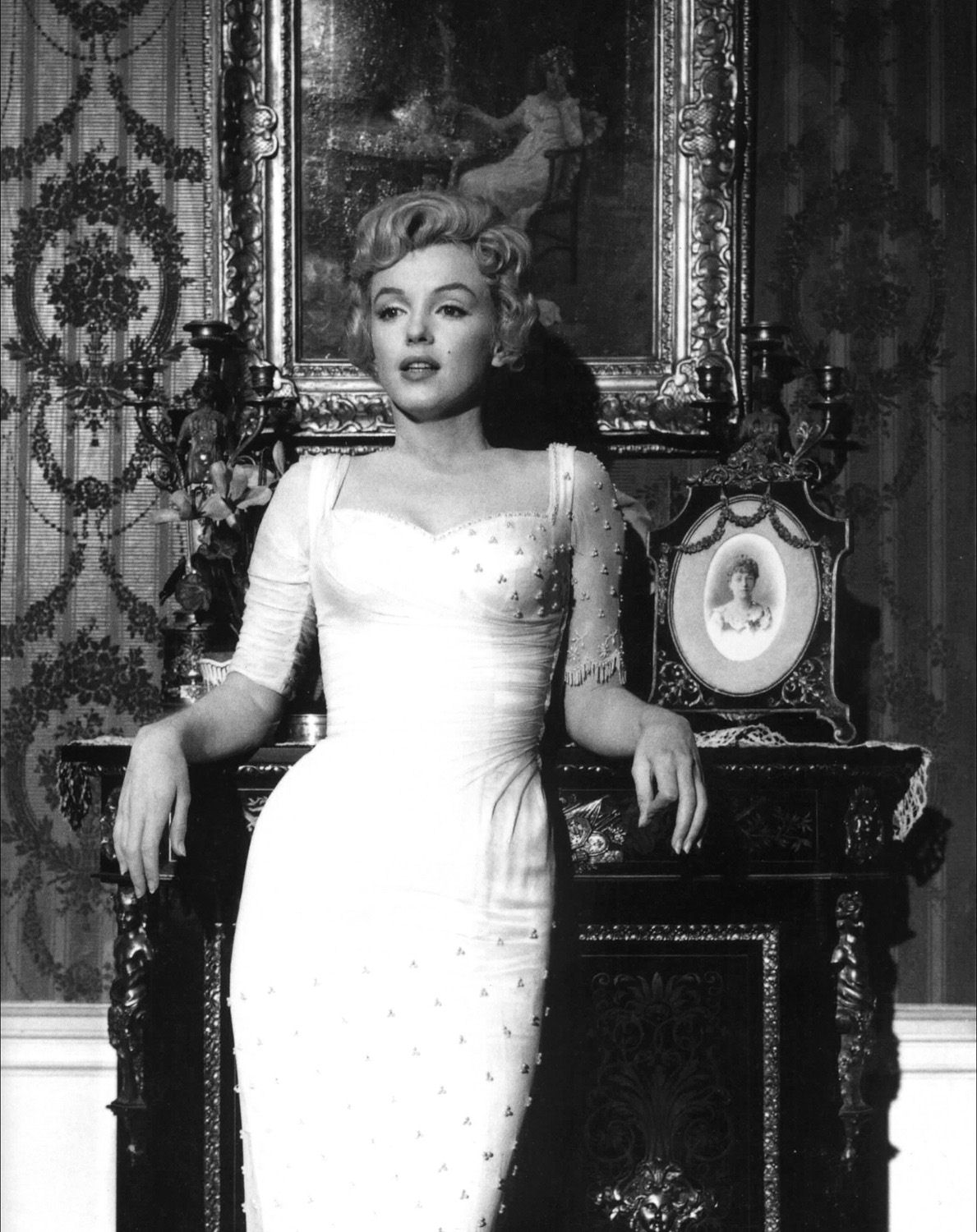
Monroe in a promotional still for The Prince and the Showgirl (1957)

- Dangerous Years (1947)
- The Asphalt Jungle (1950)
- All About Eve (1950)
- As Young as You Feel (1951)
- Clash by Night (1952)
- Don't Bother to Knock (1952)
- Monkey Business (1952)
- O. Henry's Full House (1952)
- Niagara (1953)
- Gentlemen Prefer Blondes (1953)
- How to Marry a Millionaire (1953)
- River of No Return (1954)
- There's No Business Like Show Business (1954)
- The Seven Year Itch (1955)
- Bus Stop (1956)
- The Prince and the Showgirl (1957)
- Some Like It Hot (1959)
- Let's Make Love (1960)
- The Misfits (1961)
- Something's Got to Give (1962–unfinished)

== Legacy ==
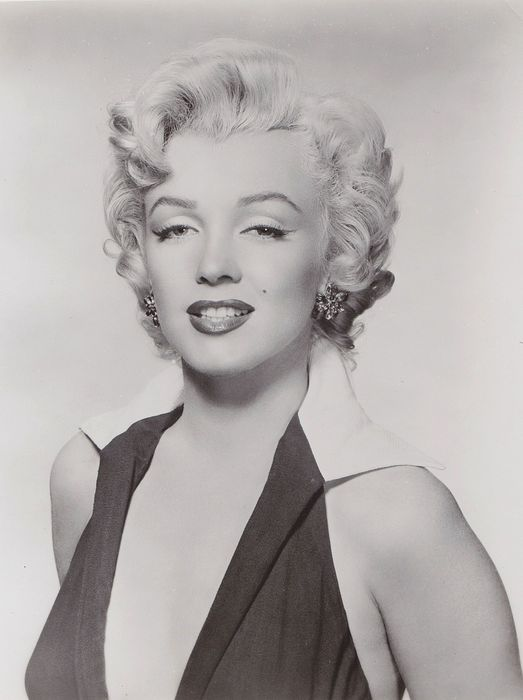
Monroe in a publicity photo for Niagara in 1953. One of the most iconic photos of Monroe, it was the basis for Andy Warhol's 1962 silkscreen painting, Marilyn Diptych.

According to The Guide to United States Popular Culture, "as an icon of American popular culture, Monroe's few rivals in popularity include Elvis Presley and Mickey Mouse... no other star has ever inspired such a wide range of emotions—from lust to pity, from envy to remorse." Art historian Gail Levin stated that Monroe may have been "the most photographed person of the 20th century", and The American Film Institute has named her the sixth greatest female screen legend in American film history. The Smithsonian Institution has included her on their list of "100 Most Significant Americans of All Time", and both Variety and VH1 have placed her in the top ten in their rankings of the greatest popular culture icons of the twentieth century.

Hundreds of books have been written about Monroe. She has been the subject of numerous films, plays, operas, and songs, and has influenced artists and entertainers such as Andy Warhol and Madonna. Documentaries have been made about her life, e.g. The Legend of Marilyn Monroe (1966, narrated by John Huston), Marilyn (1963, hosted by Rock Hudson).

She also remains a valuable brand in advertising: her image and name have been licensed for hundreds of products, and she has been featured in advertising for brands such as Max Factor, Chanel, Mercedes-Benz, and Absolut Vodka.

Monroe's enduring popularity is tied to her conflicted public image. On the one hand, she remains a sex symbol, beauty icon and one of the most famous stars of classical Hollywood cinema. On the other, she is also remembered for her troubled private life, unstable childhood, struggle for professional respect, as well as her death and the conspiracy theories that surrounded it. She has been written about by scholars and journalists who are interested in gender and feminism; these writers include Gloria Steinem, Jacqueline Rose, Molly Haskell, Sarah Churchwell, and Lois Banner. Some, such as Steinem, have viewed her as a victim of the studio system. Others, such as Haskell, Rose, and Churchwell, have instead stressed Monroe's proactive role in her career and in the creation of her public persona.

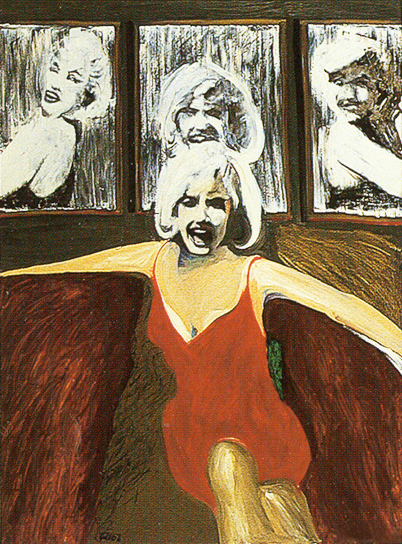
Panel from pop artist James Gill's painting Marilyn Triptych (1962)

Owing to the contrast between her stardom and troubled private life, Monroe is closely linked to broader discussions about modern phenomena such as mass media, fame, and consumer culture. According to academic Susanne Hamscha, Monroe has continued relevance to ongoing discussions about modern society, and she is "never completely situated in one time or place" but has become "a surface on which narratives of American culture can be (re)constructed". Similarly, Banner has called Monroe the "eternal shapeshifter" who is re-created by "each generation, even each individual... to their own specifications".

Monroe remains a cultural icon, but critics are divided on her legacy as an actress. David Thomson called her body of work "insubstantial" and Pauline Kael wrote that she "used her lack of an actress's skills to amuse the public. She had the wit or crassness or desperation to turn cheesecake into acting—and vice versa; she did what others had the 'good taste' not to do". In contrast, Peter Bradshaw wrote that Monroe was a talented comedian who "understood how comedy achieved its effects", and Roger Ebert wrote that "Monroe's eccentricities and neuroses on sets became notorious, but studios put up with her long after any other actress would have been blackballed because what they got back on the screen was magical". Jonathan Rosenbaum stated that "she subtly subverted the sexist content of her material" and that "the difficulty some people have discerning Monroe's intelligence as an actress seems rooted in the ideology of a repressive era, when super feminine women weren't supposed to be smart".

In 2019, Time created 89 new covers to celebrate women of the year starting from 1920; it chose her for 1954.

In 2024, the Los Angeles City Council approved Monroe's house being designated as a Historic Cultural Monument.

In June 2026, on Monroe's 100th birthday her eight page love letter, a Dior dress and her acting notes were auctioned at Heritage Auctions.
