= Sarah Churchwell =

American academic

Sarah Bartlett Churchwell is a professor of American Literature and Public Understanding of the Humanities at the School of Advanced Study, University of London, UK. Her research is into 20th- and 21st-century American literature and cultural history, especially the 1920s and 1930s. She has appeared on British television and radio and has been a judge for the Booker Prize, the Baillie Gifford Prize, the Women's Prize for Fiction, and the David Cohen Prize for Literature. She is the director of the Being Human festival and the author of three books: The Many Lives of Marilyn Monroe; Careless People: Murder, Mayhem and the Invention of The Great Gatsby; and Behold America: A History of America First and the American Dream. In April 2021, she was long-listed for the Orwell Prize for Journalism.

== Early life ==
Churchwell grew up in Winnetka, near Chicago, Illinois. She has a Bachelor of Arts degree in English Literature from Vassar College and an MA and PhD in English and American Literature from Princeton University.

== Career ==
Churchwell lectured at the University of East Anglia from 1999 until 2015, when she became professor of American Literature and Public Understanding of the Humanities and director of the Being Human festival at the School of Advanced Study at London University.

She has written for outlets such as The New York Review of Books, The New York Times Book Review, The Times Literary Supplement, The Spectator, and the New Statesman.

Her books include The Many Lives of Marilyn Monroe (2004); and Careless People: Murder, Mayhem and the Invention of The Great Gatsby (2013) about F. Scott Fitzgerald.

Radio appearances include the BBC Radio 4 In Our Time. She has written and presented Radio 4 documentaries on Henry James, the American Dream and America First, The Great Gatsby, When Harry Met Sally, and Radio 3 essays on Screen Goddesses (2017) and Screen Gods (2019).

Churchwell was a judge for the 2014 Man Booker Prize.

== Work ==
- The Many Lives of Marilyn Monroe. Picador, 2005. ISBN 0-312-42565-1.
- Careless People: Murder, Mayhem and the Invention of The Great Gatsby. Little, Brown Book Group Ltd, 2013. ISBN 1-84408-767-0.
- Behold America: A History of America First and the American Dream. Bloomsbury, 2018. ISBN 978-1-4088-9480-4.
- The Wrath to Come: Gone with the Wind and the Lies America Tells. Apollo Publishing International, 2022. ISBN 978-1-7895-4298-1.

=== Edited volumes ===
- Forgotten Fitzgerald: Echoes of a Lost America. (London: Virago, October 2014). ISBN 978-0-349-14026-1.
- Must Read: Rediscovering American Bestsellers, co-editor with Dr Thomas Ruys Smith. (New York: Bloomsbury Academic, 2012). ISBN 978-1-4411-6216-8.
- Introduction to L. Frank Baum, The Wizard of Oz (London: Pan Macmillan, 2018).
- Introduction to Henry James, The Ambassadors (London: Everyman, 2016).
- Introduction to Iris Murdoch, The Sea, The Sea and A Severed Head (London: Everyman, February 2016). ISBN 978-1-84159-370-8.
- Introduction to Julian Barnes, Flaubert’s Parrot and A History of the World in 10 ½ Chapters (London: Everyman, 2012). ISBN 978-1-84159-348-7.
- Introduction to James Fenimore Cooper, The Last of the Mohicans (London: Folio Society, 2011).
- Introduction to Pale Horse, Pale Rider: The Selected Stories of Katherine Anne Porter (London: Penguin Books, 2011). ISBN 978-0-14-119531-5.
- Introduction to Flappers and Philosophers: The Collected Stories of F. Scott Fitzgerald. (London: Penguin Books, 2010). ISBN 978-0-14-119250-5.
