= Blonde (2001 film) =

2001 television film by Joyce Chopra

- Genre: Biographical/drama
- Based on: Blonde by Joyce Carol Oates
- Screenplay by: Joyce Eliason
- Directed by: Joyce Chopra
- Starring: Poppy Montgomery; Patricia Richardson; Patrick Dempsey; Jensen Ackles; Kirstie Alley; Ann-Margret
- Theme music composer: Patrick Williams
- Country of origin: United States
- Original language: English
- No. of episodes: 2

Production
- Producer: Brad Gordon
- Cinematography: James Glennon
- Editor: Deborah Zeitman
- Running time: 165 minutes
- Production companies: Fireworks Entertainment; Robert Greenwald Productions

Original release
- Network: CBS
- Release: May 13, 2001

Blonde is a 2001 American made-for-television biographical fiction film on the life of Marilyn Monroe, with Australian actress Poppy Montgomery in the lead role. The film was adapted from Joyce Carol Oates's 2000 Pulitzer Prize finalist novel of the same name.

== Premise ==
A fictional biography of Marilyn Monroe mixed with a series of real events in her life. With glimpses into her childhood years, teenaged marriage to first husband, James Dougherty, meeting with photographer Otto Ose, career with 20th Century Fox, relationship with her mother, her foster parents, Charles Chaplin Jr. (Cass), Edward G. Robinson Jr. (Eddie G), and her marriages to baseball player Joe DiMaggio and playwright Arthur Miller.

== Cast ==
- Poppy Montgomery as Norma Jeane Baker / Marilyn Monroe
  - Skye McCole Bartusiak as Young Norma Jeane
- Patricia Richardson as Gladys Pearl Baker
- Patrick Dempsey as Cass Bulut
- Jensen Ackles as Eddie G.
- Kirstie Alley as Elsie – Grace Goddard
- Ann-Margret as Della Monroe
- Wallace Shawn as I. E. Shinn – Johnny Hyde
- Titus Welliver as The Baseball Player
- Griffin Dunne as The Playwright
- Eric Bogosian as Otto Ose
- Niklaus Lange as Bucky Glazer – James Dougherty
- Richard Roxburgh as Mr. R – Darryl F. Zanuck
- Emily Browning as Fleece
- Matthew O'Sullivan as Lee Strasberg
- Andrew Clarke as Laurence Olivier
- Shayne Greenman as Clark Gable
- Renee Henderson as Jane Russell
- Mark Lee as Porn Dealer
- Mark Mitchell as Texas Oilman
- Brett Tucker as Actor at White Party
- Bernard Curry as Assistant to Director J.
- Steven Vidler as Warren
- Richard Morgan as Buddy 2

== Reception ==
In the United States' review aggregator, the Rotten Tomatoes, in the score where the site staff categorizes the opinions of independent media and mainstream media only positive or negative, the film has an approval rating of 60% calculated based on five critics reviews. By comparison, with the same opinions being calculated using a weighted arithmetic mean, the score achieved is 3.3/10.

Steven Oxman of Variety considered that Blonde's approach as a work of fiction instead of a "based on true events" retelling allowed creators "to be far more imaginative in their suppositions about the characters' private thoughts" than similar works.

== See also ==
- Blonde, a 2022 Netflix adaptation of Oates' novel, starring Ana de Armas as Marilyn.
