= Evan Williams (actor) =

Canadian actor (born 1985)

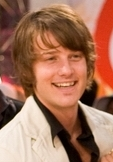
- Williams at the 2008 Toronto Film Festival
- Born: March 11, 1985 (age 41); Swan Hills, Alberta, Canada
- Occupation: Actor
- Years active: 2004–present

Evan Martin Williams (born March 11, 1985) is a Canadian actor. He made his screen debut playing secondary role in the 2006 dance drama film Save the Last Dance 2 before starring as Kelly Ashoona in the CTV teen drama series, Degrassi: The Next Generation (2008–2009). From 2015 to 2018 he starred as Chevalier de Lorraine in the historical drama series, Versailles. In 2023, he began starring as Elliot Augustine in the Hallmark Channel drama series, The Way Home.

== Early life ==
Williams was born in Swan Hills, Alberta, but raised in Calgary, Alberta. He is a graduate of Henry Wise Wood Senior High School, and studied theatre at Ryerson University (now Toronto Metropolitan University). He joined the Summerstock Conservatory, where he received the Phyllis Pope Award for Best Performance for playing the Rabbi in Fiddler on the Roof in 2004, before moving to Toronto to begin his film and television career.

== Career ==
Williams made his screen debut playing a minor role in the 2006 dance drama film Save the Last Dance 2 and later that year appeared in the made-for-television movie The House Next Door. After guest-starring appearances in television series Instant Star, Urban Legends and The Border, he gained his first major role as Kelly Ashoona in the teen drama Degrassi: The Next Generation from 2008 to 2009. From 2010 to 2011 he starred as Baxter McNab in the teen sitcom Baxter. Later in 2011, Williams played the leading role in the comedy film, Lloyd the Conqueror. He later appeared in films Ride (2014), Fishing Naked (2015), Farhope Tower (2015) and played the lead in the Escape Room (2017). On television, Williams had a recurring role as Luke in the MTV series Awkward (2014–16)

From 2015 to 2018, Williams starred as Philippe, Chevalier de Lorraine in the historical drama series, Versailles a role that gained him a Canadian Screen Award nomination for Best Performance by an Actor in a Featured Supporting Role in a Dramatic Program or Series. He later made guest-starring appearances in The Rookie, Fuller House and Into the Dark. In 2020, Williams starred opposite Natalie Hall in the Netflix romantic comedy film, Midnight at the Magnolia. In 2021 he starred opposite Katie Lowes in the made-for-television movie, Christmas Takes Flight. The following year, Williams played Edward "Eddy" G. Robinson Jr. in the biographical film, Blonde. Also in 2022 he played Meriwether Lewis in Mysterious Circumstance: The Death of Meriwether Lewis. In 2023 he began starring as Elliot Augustine in the Hallmark Channel drama series, The Way Home.

== Personal life ==
Williams has worked with the charity buildOn to help build schools in impoverished areas, as well as with Free the Children in Ecuador and India.

== Filmography ==
=== Film ===
Year	Title	Role	Notes
2006	Save the Last Dance 2	Shane	Direct-to-video
2010	A Flesh Offering	Joe	
2011	Lloyd the Conqueror	Lloyd	
2011	Trust Me	Todd	Short film
2013	The Fortune Theory	Morris Swann	
2014	Garden of Eden	Ben	
2014	Fishing Naked	Rodney	
2014	Ride	Brad	
2015	Visitors Parking	Peter	Short film
2015	Farhope Tower	Andre	
2016	Paradise Club	Ben	
2017	Escape Room	Tyler	
2020	Midnight at the Magnolia	Jack	
2022	Mysterious Circumstance: The Death of Meriwether Lewis	Meriwether Lewis	Won - Oniros Film Award for Best Actor
2022	Blonde	Edward "Eddy" G. Robinson Jr.	Nominated – Golden Raspberry Award for Worst Supporting Actor
2024	1 Million Followers	Jack	

=== Television ===
Year	Title	Role	Notes
2006	The House Next Door	Toby	Television film
2007	Instant Star	Cute boy	Episode: "Like a Virgin"
2007	Urban Legends	—N/a	Episode: "The Dark Side"
2008	The Border	Matt Sharpe	Episode: "Family Values"
2008–2009	Degrassi: The Next Generation	Kelly Ashoona	11 episodes
2009	Grey Gardens	Young banker	Television film
2009	Degrassi Goes Hollywood	Kelly Ashoona	Television film
2009	The National Tree	Rock Burdock	Television film
2009	Being Erica	Robin	Episode: "A River Runs Through It... It Being Egypt"
2010	Murdoch Mysteries	Jake the Magician	Episode: "Blood and Circuses"
2010	On Strike for Christmas	Mark Robertson	Television film
2010–2011	Baxter	Baxter McNab	Main cast
2011	Victorious	Shawn Becker	Episode: "Tori Tortures Teacher"
2014–2016	Awkward	Luke	Recurring role, 19 episodes
2015–2018	Versailles	Chevalier de Lorraine	Main cast Nominated - Canadian Screen Award for Best Supporting Actor in a Drama Program or Series
2019	The Rookie	Camel	Episode: "Homefront"
2019	Fuller House	Corey	Episode: "Five Dates with Kimmy Gibbler"
2019	A Date By Christmas Eve	Fisher Dougherty	Television film
2021	Into the Dark	Grant	Episode: "Tentacles"
2021	Liza on Demand	Sheraton	Episode: "Beach People"
2021	Christmas Takes Flight	Matt Hansen	Television film
2022	Westworld	Jack	Episode: "Zhuangzi"
2023–2026	The Way Home	Elliot Augustine	Main role

== Theatre ==
Year	Title	Author	Role	Director	Theatre
2004	Fiddler On the Roof	Jerry Bock, Sheldon Harnick, Joseph Stein	Rabbi		Summerstock Conservatory
2006	Escape From Grace		Julian	Beth Helmers	Toronto Fringe Festival
2007	Measure For Measure	William Shakespeare	Lucio	Michael Waller	Ryerson Theatre School
2009	Cowboys	Sam Shepard	Chet / Clem	Steven McCarthy	Candles Are For Burning Co-op
2009	Cowboys #2	Sam Shepard	Chet	Steven McCarthy	Candles Are For Burning Co-op

== Awards ==
Year	Award	Category	Project	Result
2004	Phyllis Pope Award	Best Performance	Fiddler On the Roof	Won
2017	Canadian Screen Awards	Best Supporting Actor in a Drama Program or Series	Versailles	Nominated
2021	International Sound Awards	Best Music Video	Bright World: Little Man	Won
2022	Oniros Film Awards New York	Best Actor	Mysterious Circumstance: The Death of Meriwether Lewis	Won
2022	RED Movie Awards Spring Edition	Best Actor	Mysterious Circumstance: The Death of Meriwether Lewis	Nominated
