= Blonde (novel) =

2000 novel by Joyce Carol Oates

- First edition cover
- Author: Joyce Carol Oates
- Language: English
- Genre: Biographical fiction
- Publisher: HarperCollins
- Publication date: 2000
- Publication place: United States
- Media type: Print (hardback & paperback)
- Pages: 738 pp
- ISBN: 0-06-019607-6

Blonde is a 2000 postmodern biographical fiction novel by Joyce Carol Oates that presents a fictionalized take on the life of American actress Marilyn Monroe. Oates states that the novel is a work of fiction that should not be regarded as a biography. It was a finalist for the Pulitzer Prize (2001) and the National Book Award (2000). Rocky Mountain News and Entertainment Weekly have listed Blonde as one of Joyce Carol Oates's best books. Oates regards Blonde as one of the two books (along with 1969's them) she will be remembered for.

== Length and editing ==
At over 700 pages, Blonde is one of Oates' longest works of fiction. In an interview she said, "I intended it to be a novella, somewhere around 175 pages, and the last words would have been 'Marilyn Monroe.' But over time, I got so caught up in her world that I couldn't stop there. The final result was this book. The first draft was, originally, longer than the version that was finally published. Some sections were shortened while others had to be surgically removed from the book. Those sections will be published separately."

== Names ==
Although many notable names are changed, Oates sometimes uses recognizable initials, such as "C"—a male co-star from Some Like It Hot (presumably Tony Curtis)—and more controversially, "R.F", the commander of the Sharpshooter sent to eliminate Monroe (many conspiracy theories have suggested that Robert F. Kennedy, United States Attorney General and brother of President John F. Kennedy, was involved in Monroe's death, following her alleged affairs with each of the brothers). The novel explores only a relationship with the President.

James Dougherty, Monroe's first husband, is referred to only by the pseudonym Bucky Glazer. Her second and third husbands Joe DiMaggio and Arthur Miller are instead referred to as the Ex-Athlete and the Playwright, respectively, and their actual names are never mentioned.

== Reception ==
A reviewer for Publishers Weekly quoted the author, stating that "Oates declares that her novel ""is not intended as a historic document."" Yet she illuminates the source of her subject's long emotional torment as few factual biographies ever do."

== Adaptations ==
In 2001, the novel was adapted into a CBS miniseries of the same name, which followed the novel closely. The New York Times reported that "often the director read the scene in the novel just before shooting it." The miniseries departed from the novel in leaving out the idea (which Oates discusses at length) that Monroe may have been assassinated.

A film adaptation of the novel, written and directed by Andrew Dominik and starring Cuban-Spanish actress Ana de Armas as Monroe, was released on September 28, 2022, by Netflix. Naomi Watts and Jessica Chastain were both attached to star at various points in pre-production before de Armas secured the role. De Armas received a best-actress Academy Award nomination for her performance.
