= University Heights, Calgary =

University Heights
- Neighbourhood
- Location of University Heights in Calgary
- Coordinates: 51°04′20″N 114°08′9″W
- Country: Canada
- Province: Alberta
- City: Calgary
- Quadrant: NW
- Ward: 7
- Established: 1963

Government
  - Mayor: Jeromy Farkas
  - Administrative body: Calgary City Council
  - Councillor: Myke Atkinson (Independent)

Area
  - Total: 0.7 km^{2} (0.27 sq mi)
- Elevation: 1,105 m (3,625 ft)

Population (2006)
  - Total: 2,919
  - Average Income: $43,079
- Website: University Heights Community Association

University Heights is a residential neighbourhood in the northwest quadrant of Calgary, Alberta, Canada. It is bordered by the University of Calgary, McMahon Stadium, the Alberta Children's Hospital and Foothills Hospital. It is a relatively small neighbourhood and is bounded to the north by 24 Avenue NW, to the east by University Drive NW, to the south by 16 Avenue NW (Trans-Canada Highway) and to the west by Shaganappi Trail NW.

University Heights was established in 1963. It is represented in the Calgary City Council by the Ward 1 councillor.

== Demographics ==
In the City of Calgary's 2012 municipal census, University Heights had a population of 2,928 living in 1,380 dwellings, a 1.3% increase from its 2011 population of 2,890. With a land area of 0.8 km^{2} (0.31 sq mi), it had a population density of 3,660/km^{2} (9,500/sq mi) in 2012.

Residents in this community had a median household income of $43,079 in 2000, and there were 30.3% low income residents living in the neighbourhood. As of 2000, 28% of the residents were immigrants. A proportion of 64.6% of the buildings were condominiums or apartments, and 66.5% of the housing was used for renting.

== Education ==
There are two schools in this neighbourhood:

- Westmount Charter School and
- University Elementary School.
