= Florentine Gardens =

Nightclub in Hollywood, California,

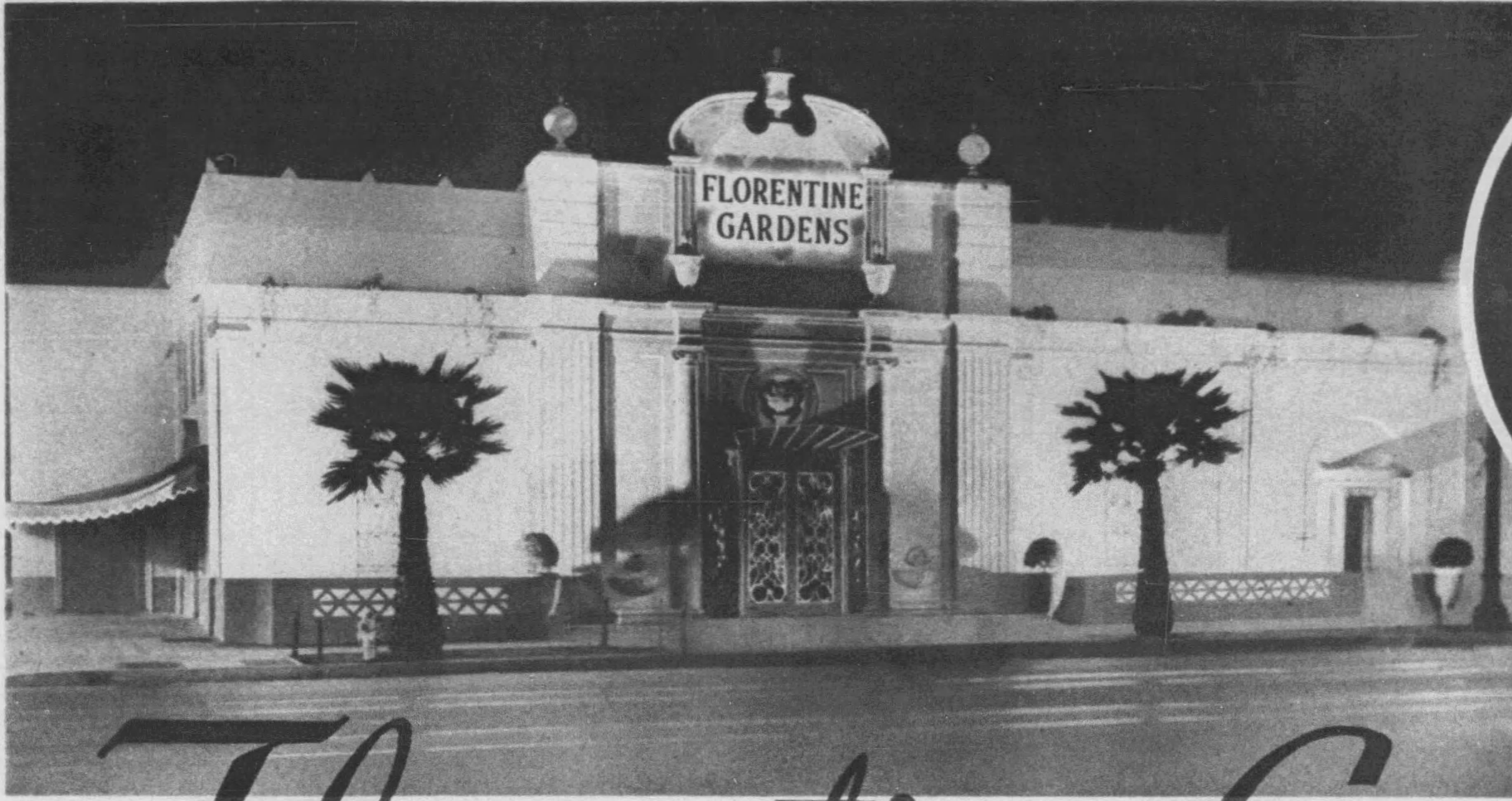
- Florentine Gardens, Jan 1939
- Location: 5955 Hollywood Boulevard; Hollywood, California; United States
- Type: Nightclub

Construction
- Built: 1938
- Opened: 1938
- Renovated: 1981
- Closed: 1948; transformed into The Cotton Club; Returned to the Florentine Gardens in 1982

Website
- https://www.florentinehollywood.com/

The Florentine Gardens was a nightclub in Hollywood, California, at 5955 Hollywood Boulevard, opened on December 28, 1938, by restaurateur Guido Braccini. The building was designed by architect Gordon B. Kaufmann and featured a European garden motif. Nils Thor Granlund (known as N.T.G.), who had been a radio announcer as well as a promoter and producer of live shows in New York, became manager and emcee of the club and brought in big bands and well-known performers including The Mills Brothers, The Ink Spots, Sophie Tucker, and fan dancer Sally Rand.

The original Florentine Gardens was a restaurant serving Italian food that also offered dancing and live entertainment – often of the burlesque variety. The venue seated over 1000 patrons for dinner and was popular with American servicemen on leave in Hollywood during World War II. Dance performances at the club helped launch the careers of actors Gwen Verdon and Yvonne DeCarlo. Sixteen-year-old Norma Jeane Mortenson (later known as Marilyn Monroe) met 22-year-old defense plant worker Jim Dougherty at the Florentine Gardens and the couple held their wedding reception at the venue in June 1942.

The club closed in 1948 and new owners renamed it The Cotton Club. It later became a club featuring scantily clad dancers, was a Salvation Army outpost, a dental school, salsa club, and hip hop club. Avalon Attractions started booking acts at the “New Florentine Gardens” in 1981, featuring such acts as Chuck Berry, X, Dead Kennedys, Circle Jerks, Fear, and The Blasters. Between 1982 and 1983 on Friday nights they had KROQ (a SoCal New Wave Dance Music Station) Nights with KROQ's & VH1 DJ Richard Blade and Saturday nights was Florentine's resident DJ Ralphie Dee.

Owner Kenneth MacKenzie fought efforts by the City of Los Angeles to demolish the club in 2005 to build a new fire station.

== Notable performers ==
- The Mills Brothers
- Yvonne DeCarlo
- Gwen Verdon
- Sally Rand
- Sophie Tucker
- Ozzie Nelson
- Joe E. Lewis
- Ethel Waters
- The Ink Spots
- Henny Youngman
- Fats Waller
- Lily St. Cyr
- Al Jolson
- Jean Spangler
