= Blonde (2022 film) =

2022 film by Andrew Dominik

- Release poster
- Directed by: Andrew Dominik
- Screenplay by: Andrew Dominik
- Based on: Blonde by Joyce Carol Oates
- Produced by: Brad Pitt; Dede Gardner; Jeremy Kleiner; Tracey Landon; Scott Robertson
- Starring: Ana de Armas; Adrien Brody; Bobby Cannavale; Xavier Samuel; Julianne Nicholson
- Cinematography: Chayse Irvin
- Edited by: Adam Robinson
- Music by: Nick Cave; Warren Ellis
- Production company: Plan B Entertainment
- Distributed by: Netflix
- Release dates: September 8, 2022 (Venice); September 16, 2022 (United States); September 28, 2022 (Netflix)
- Running time: 166 minutes
- Country: United States
- Language: English
- Budget: $22 million

Blonde is a 2022 American psychological drama film written and directed by Andrew Dominik, based on the 2000 novel by Joyce Carol Oates. The film is a fictionalized account of the life and career of American actress Marilyn Monroe, played by Ana de Armas. The cast also includes Adrien Brody, Bobby Cannavale, Xavier Samuel, and Julianne Nicholson.

Dede Gardner, Jeremy Kleiner, Tracey Landon, Brad Pitt, and Scott Robertson produced the film. After a lengthy period of development that began in 2010, Blonde entered production in August 2019 in Los Angeles. Production wrapped in July 2021, following the shutdowns caused by the COVID-19 pandemic. The film plays with shifting aspect ratios and alternates between color and black and white.

Blonde premiered at the 79th Venice International Film Festival on September 8, 2022, where it received a 14-minute standing ovation. It began a limited theatrical release in the US on September 16, before its streaming release on September 28 by Netflix. It is the first NC-17-rated film to be released exclusively to a streaming service. The film received mixed reviews from critics and audiences; while de Armas's performance garnered praise, the fictionalization of Monroe's life was considered exploitative and the screenplay was criticized. Blonde received eight nominations at the 43rd Golden Raspberry Awards, winning Worst Picture and Worst Screenplay, while De Armas was nominated for the Academy Award, Actor Award, BAFTA Award, and Golden Globe Award, all for Best Actress.

== Plot ==
Six-year-old Norma Jeane Mortenson is raised by her mentally unstable mother, Gladys Pearl Baker. On her seventh birthday in 1933, Norma Jeane is given a framed picture of a man Gladys claims was her father. Later that night, a fire breaks out in Hollywood Hills. Gladys attempts to drive Norma Jeane there, saying a friend with a fireproof mansion lives nearby, but is forced to return by police. When Norma asks why her father left, Gladys becomes enraged, crying, shouting, and hitting her. Back home, Gladys runs a bath and forces Norma Jeane in despite her protests, then tries to drown her. Norma Jeane flees to her neighbor Miss Flynn, and days later is sent to an orphanage while Gladys is admitted to a mental hospital.

In the 1940s, Norma Jeane becomes a pin-up model under the name "Marilyn Monroe," appearing on magazine covers and calendars. While trying to break into acting, she is raped by studio head Mr. Z. In 1951, she auditions for Don't Bother to Knock; though she breaks down, she impresses the casting director and is given the part. As her career rises, she meets Charles "Cass" Chaplin Jr. and Edward G. "Eddy" Robinson Jr., becoming a lover to both. She gains wider fame with Niagara, but her agent urges her to limit public appearances with them, upsetting her as she feels the Marilyn persona is not her real self.

Norma Jeane becomes pregnant by Cass and, fearing the child may inherit her mother's condition, decides on an abortion. Though she changes her mind on the day, her pleas are ignored. She later ends her relationships with Cass and Eddy. She meets Joe DiMaggio, who sympathizes with her desire to leave Hollywood and pursue serious acting in New York City. During Gentlemen Prefer Blondes, she receives a letter from a man claiming to be her father. Feeling detached from her performance at the premiere, she returns to her hotel expecting to meet him, but instead finds DiMaggio, who proposes; she accepts reluctantly.

Their marriage deteriorates when Cass and Eddy give Joe nude publicity photos of her, enraging him; he hits Norma Jeane and demands she stop making The Seven Year Itch. She continues filming, performing the famous white dress scene. Returning home, she faces further violence and soon divorces him.

In 1955, Norma Jeane auditions for the Broadway play Magda by Arthur Miller. Though initially unimpressed, Miller warms to her insight. They marry and move to Maine, where she becomes pregnant again, but later suffers a miscarriage after a fall. Distraught, she returns to acting. While filming Some Like It Hot, she becomes increasingly unstable, overwhelmed by press attention, clashing with director Billy Wilder and growing distant from Miller, while relying on pills.

By 1962, she is dependent on drugs and alcohol. Secret Service agents take an intoxicated Norma Jeane to meet President John F. Kennedy, who rapes her before she is dismissed. Disoriented, she questions her life as Marilyn Monroe and hallucinates another abortion before returning to her home in Los Angeles. Eddy later informs her that Cass has died and left her a package containing a stuffed tiger and a letter revealing he had been writing the letters posing as her father.

Shattered, Norma Jeane overdoses on barbiturates; as she dies, she envisions her father welcoming her into the afterlife.

== Cast ==
- Ana de Armas as Norma Jeane
  - Lily Fisher as young Norma Jeane
  - Vanessa Lemonides as Marilyn Monroe's singing voice
- Adrien Brody as The Playwright, Arthur Miller
- Bobby Cannavale as Ex-Athlete, Joe DiMaggio
- Xavier Samuel as Cass Chaplin, the son of silent film icon Charlie Chaplin
- Julianne Nicholson as Gladys Pearl Baker, Marilyn Monroe's mentally unstable mother
- Evan Williams as Edward "Eddy" G. Robinson Jr.
- Toby Huss as Whitey, Marilyn Monroe's personal makeup artist
- David Warshofsky as Mr. Z, Darryl F. Zanuck
- Caspar Phillipson as President John F. Kennedy
- Dan Butler as I.E. Shinn
- Sara Paxton as Miss Flynn
- Rebecca Wisocky as Yvet
- Tygh Runyan as Stanley Gifford, Marilyn Monroe's Father
- Michael Drayer as Deputy Will Bonnie
- Ryan Vincent as Uncle Clive
- Patrick Brennan as Joe
- Eric Matheny as Joseph Cotten
- Lucy DeVito as Ex-Athlete's Niece
- Scoot McNairy as Tommy Ewell / Richard Sherman
- Ravil Isyanov as Billy Wilder
- Catherine Dent as Jean
- Michael Masini as Tony Curtis / Josephine. Additionally, Curtis is credited as himself as his performance in Some Like It Hot is used through archival footage.
- Chris Lemmon as Jack Lemmon / Daphne
- Ned Bellamy as Doc Fell
- Haley Webb as Brooke
- Eden Riegel as Esther (uncredited)
- Garret Dillahunt as Boss (uncredited)
- Spencer Garrett as President's Pimp (uncredited)

== Production ==
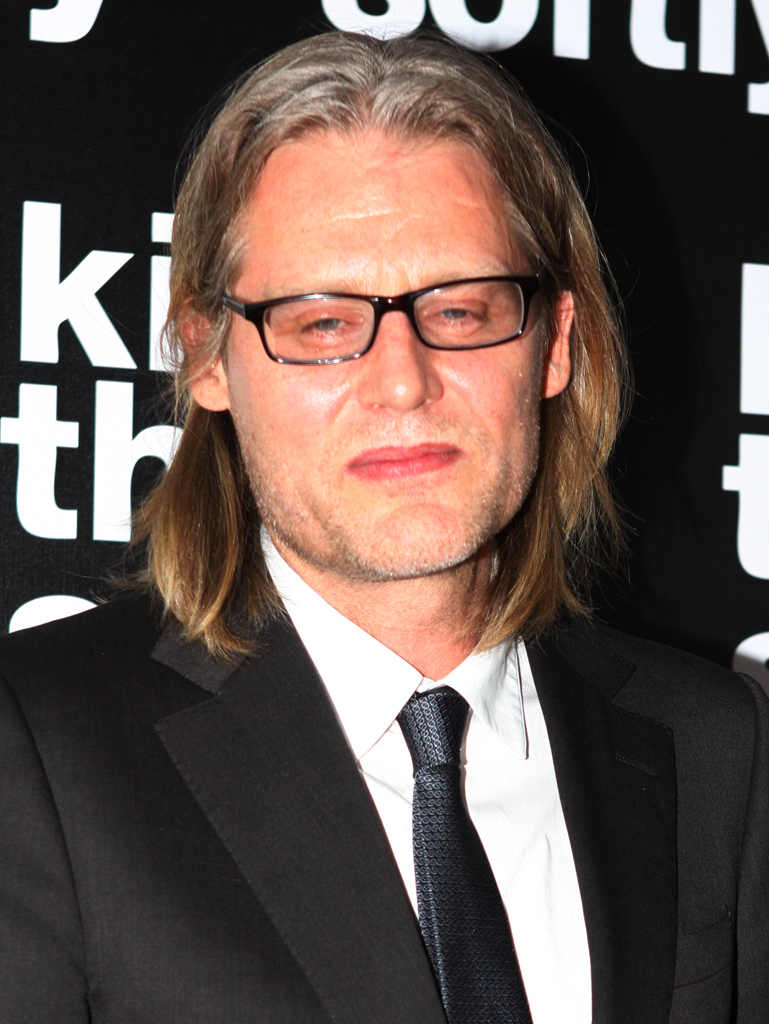
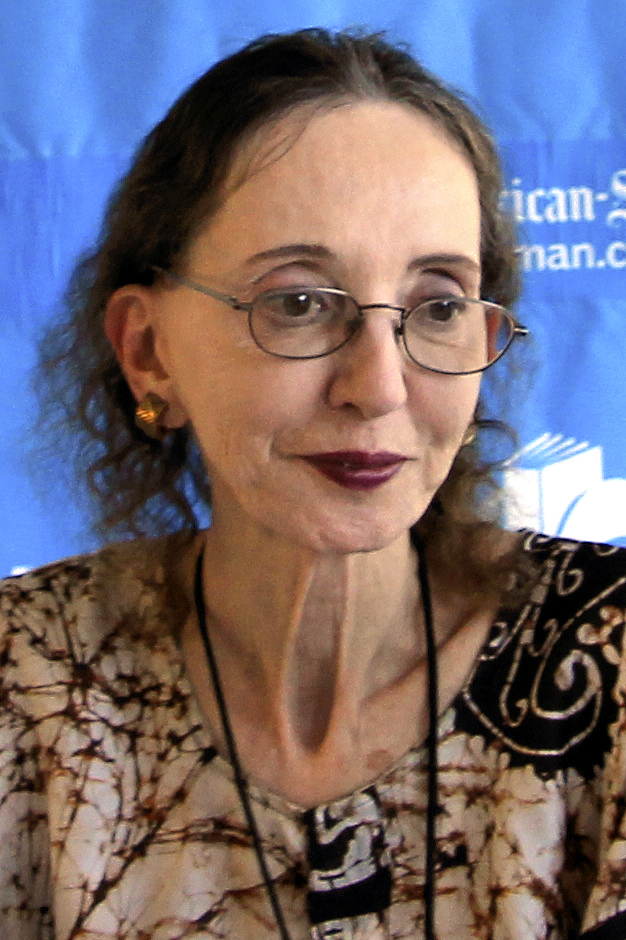
Writer and director Andrew Dominik and Joyce Carol Oates, the author of the novel on which the film is based.

=== Development and writing ===
As early as 2010, director and screenwriter Andrew Dominik began developing the project, which is an adaptation of the novel Blonde (2000), a fictional and controversial account of Monroe's life—and a Pulitzer Prize finalist—by Joyce Carol Oates. Dominik said that he read several of Monroe's biographies but that he used very little of this research in the film, adding that Oates' novel was "pretty much the bible for the film." Dominik told Vulture that Blonde is "a film that definitely has a morality about it. But it swims in very ambiguous waters because I don't think it will be as cut-and-dried as people want to see it. There's something in it to offend everyone."

Dominik discussed his fascination with Marilyn Monroe, stating, "Why is Marilyn Monroe the great female icon of the 20th Century? For men she is an object of sexual desire that is desperately in need of rescue. For women, she embodies all the injustices visited upon the feminine, a sister, a Cinderella, consigned to live among the ashes [...] I want to tell the story of Norma Jean [sic] as a central figure in a fairytale; an orphan child lost in the woods of Hollywood, being consumed by that great icon of the twentieth century."

Dominik described the film as being "more accessible" than his previous projects and revealed that his script contained "very little dialogue", as he preferred to make it more of an "avalanche of images and events." Furthermore, Dominik stated:

It tells the story of how a childhood trauma shapes an adult who's split between a public and a private self. It's basically the story of every human being, but it's using a certain sense of association that we have with something very familiar, just through media exposure. It takes all of those things and turns the meanings of them inside out, according to how she feels, which is basically how we live. It's how we all operate in the world. It just seems to me to be very resonant. I think the project has got a lot of really exciting possibilities, in terms of what can be done, cinematically.

For Dominik, Blonde was his first attempt at developing a film featuring a woman at the center of the story. During a retrospective screening of his Oscar-nominated western The Assassination of Jesse James by the Coward Robert Ford (2007), Dominik stated, "It's a different thing for me to do [...] the main character is female. My films are fairly bereft of women and now I'm imagining what it's like to be one."

While Netflix classified Blonde as "a fictional portrait of Marilyn Monroe" on the platform's official website, Dominik stated; "I think Blonde is a work of fiction and it's got just as much Joyce in it as it does Marilyn. But having said that, I think it's probably closer to the truth than what Fox is pushing to sell Marilyn stuff."

=== Pre-production ===
In May 2010, it was announced that Naomi Watts would star in the film as Monroe, and that the production, which at this point cost an estimated $20 million, was slated to begin principal photography in January 2011. Principal photography on the film did not commence, with Dominik later stating he hoped it would be his next film, with production commencing in 2013. During this time, Dominik directed the crime drama Killing Them Softly (2012), starring Brad Pitt, who subsequently became interested in the project.

In June 2012, it was announced Plan B Entertainment would produce the film, with Pitt, Dede Gardner and Jeremy Kleiner serving as producers, but Watts' participation was in question, as "it's likely that the filmmakers would go in a different direction," according to the report. In April 2014, it was announced that Jessica Chastain had replaced Watts as Monroe. Chastain had co-starred in Terrence Malick's drama The Tree of Life (2011) opposite Pitt, who was instrumental in her casting. The report also revealed that Dominik was planning to begin principal photography in August of that year.

Dominik attributed the delays in production partly due to financing: "it's just a question of how much money I can get to make the film. And I really want to make that movie. I've been working on it for years."

In August 2016, it was announced that Netflix would distribute the film.

=== Casting ===
In March 2019, it was announced that Ana de Armas was in early negotiations to star in the film, replacing Chastain. Dominik noticed de Armas's performance in Knock Knock, and while she went through a long casting process, Dominik secured her the role after the first audition.

In preparation, de Armas worked with a dialect coach for a year. De Armas described her casting process: "I only had to audition for Marilyn once and Andrew said 'It's you,' but I had to audition for everyone else [...] The producers. The money people. I always have people I needed to convince. But I knew I could do it. Playing Marilyn was groundbreaking. A Cuban playing Marilyn Monroe. I wanted it so badly. You see that famous photo of her and she is smiling in the moment, but that's just a slice of what she was really going through at the time."

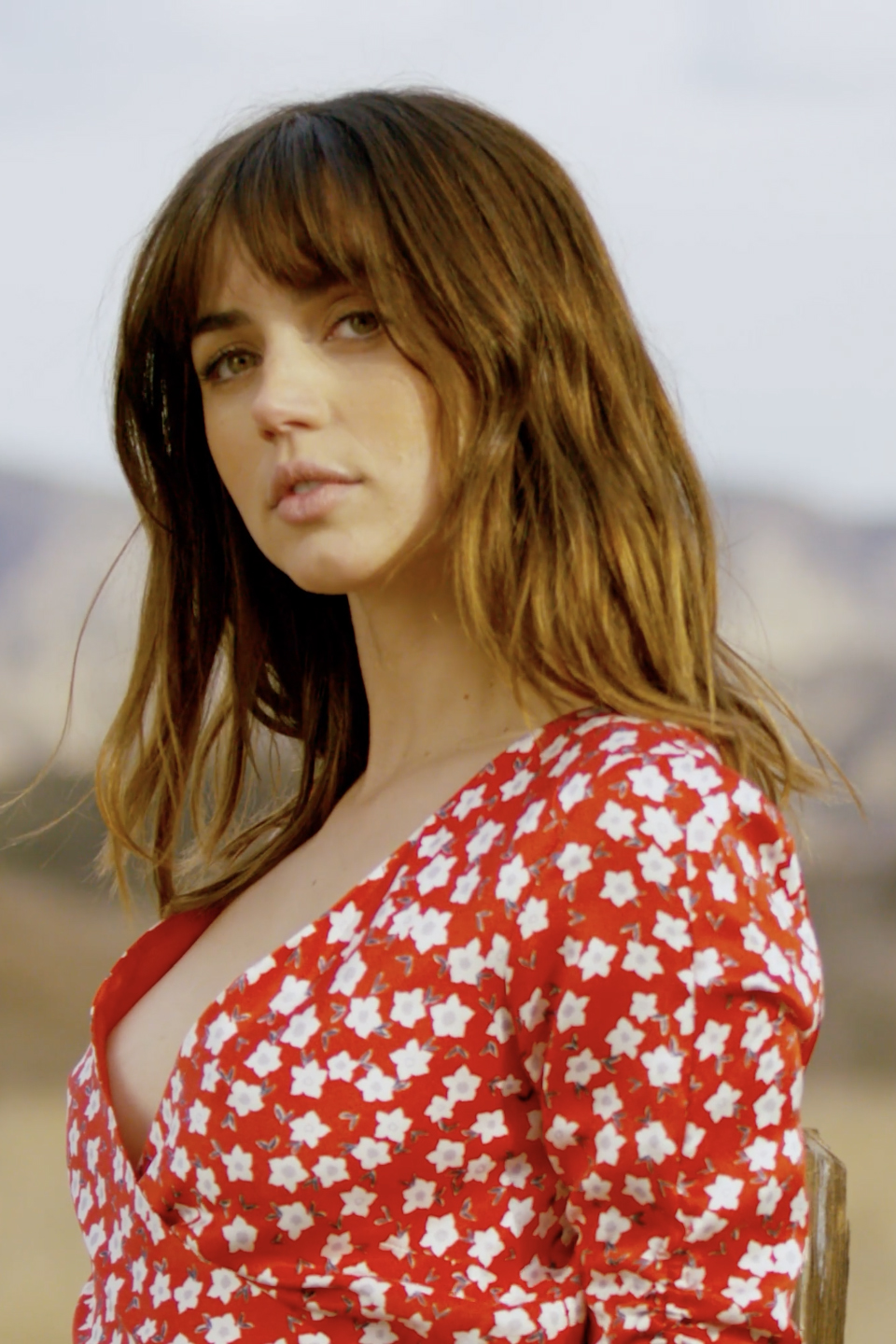
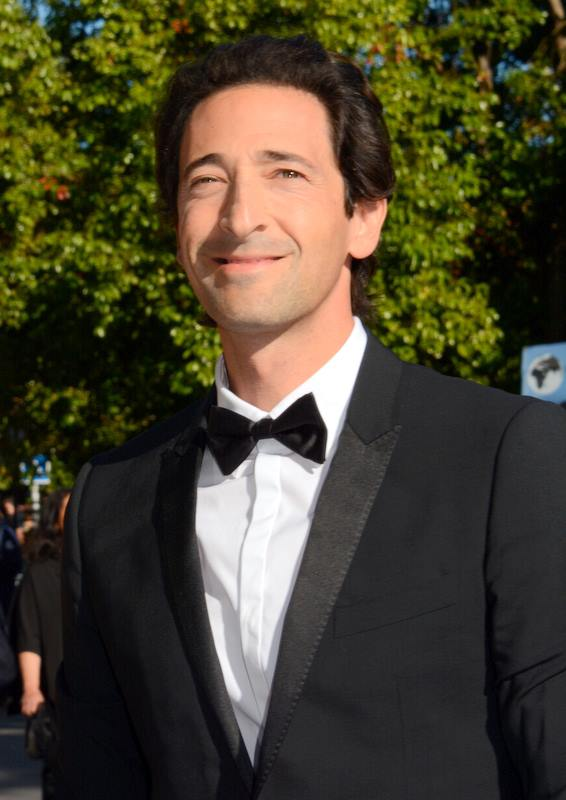
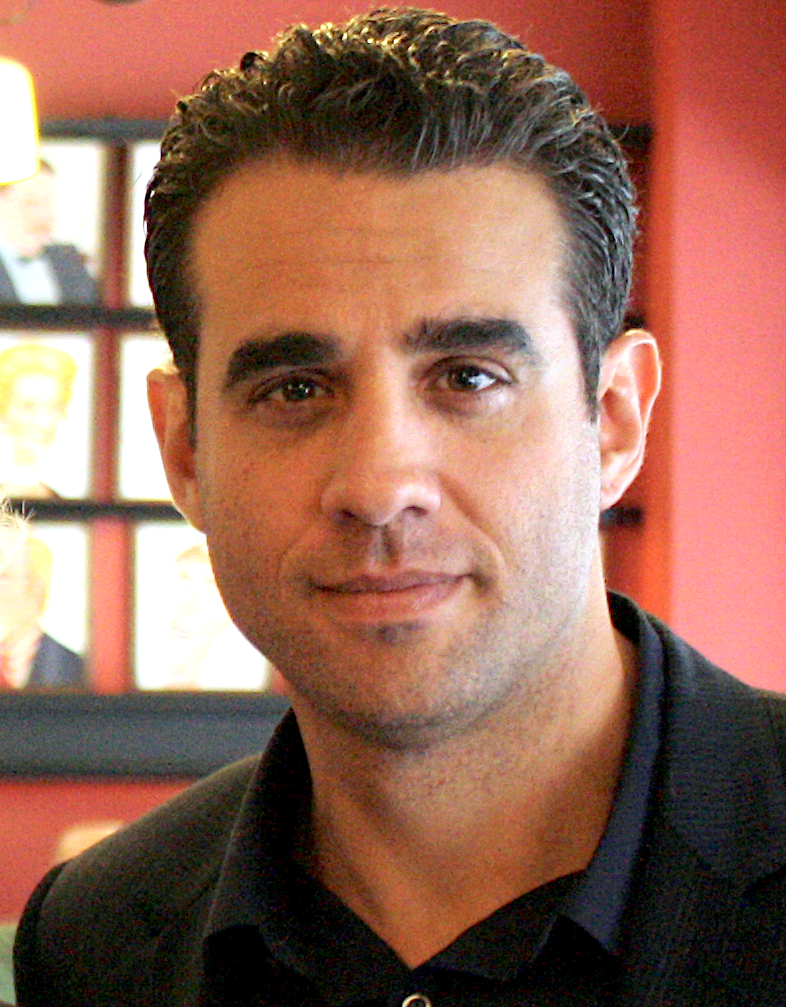
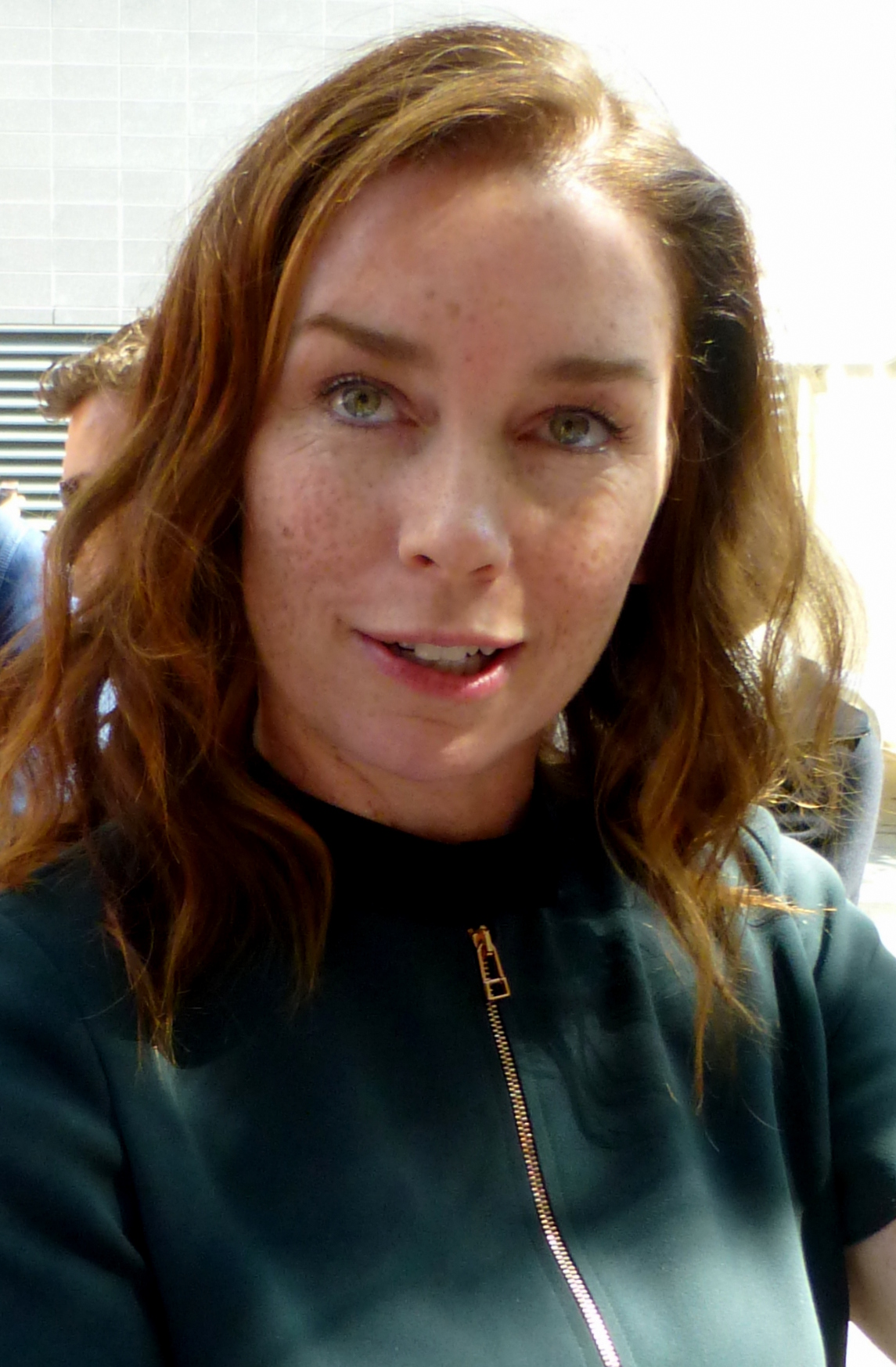
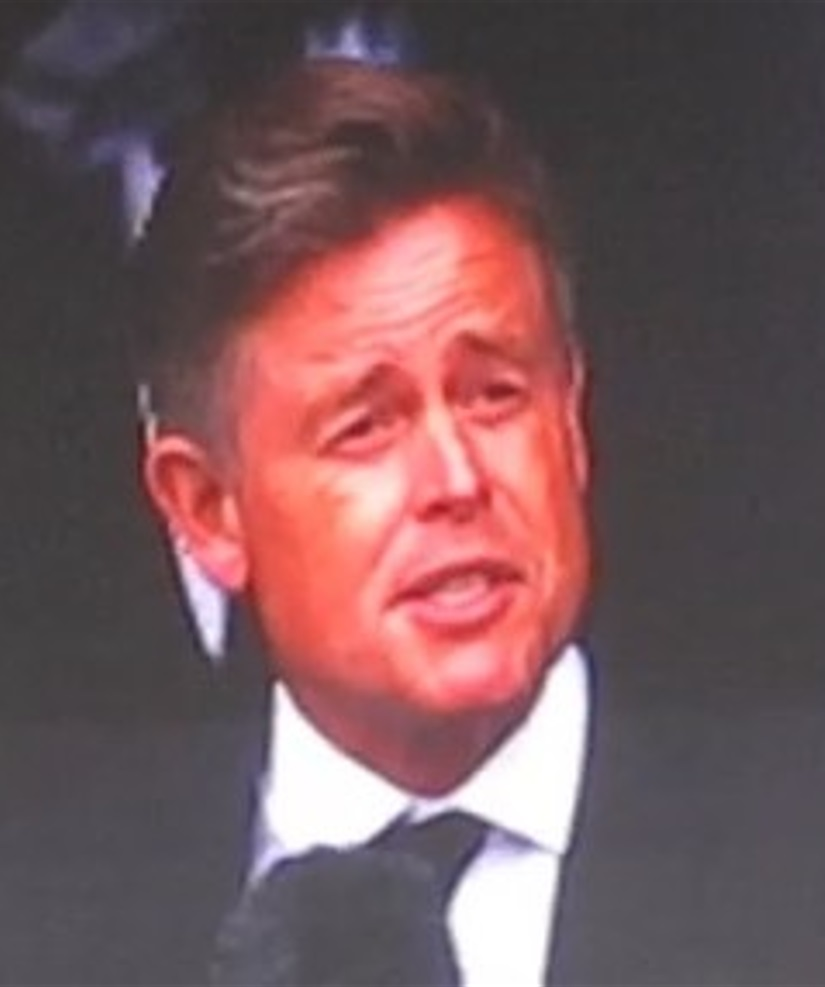
Ana de Armas, Adrien Brody, Bobby Cannavale, Julianne Nicholson and Caspar Phillipson play Marilyn Monroe, Arthur Miller, Joe DiMaggio, Gladys Pearl Baker and John F. Kennedy, respectively.

De Armas considered her relationship with Dominik to be the most collaborative of her career, remarking, "Yes, I have had collaborative relationships, but to get phone calls at midnight because he has an idea and he can't sleep and all of a sudden you can't sleep for the same reason." De Armas read Oates' novel and also said she studied hundreds of photographs, videos, audio recordings, and films.

In August 2019, it was announced that Adrien Brody, Bobby Cannavale, Julianne Nicholson, Caspar Phillipson, Sara Paxton and Xavier Samuel joined the cast, followed by Garret Dillahunt, Scoot McNairy, Lucy DeVito, Michael Masini, Spencer Garrett, Chris Lemmon, Rebecca Wisocky, Ned Bellamy and Dan Butler in September 2019.

Vanessa Lemonides provided Monroe's singing voice in the film.

=== Filming ===
Principal photography began in Los Angeles in August 2019. In April 2022, Dominik confirmed that the filming was finished in July 2021, following the shutdowns as a result of the ongoing COVID-19 pandemic in 2020, and that post-production had also been finished.

During Blonde's press conference at the 79th Venice Film Festival, Dominik said that the initial scenes of the film were shot in the same apartment where Monroe had lived with her mother. Monroe's death scene was also filmed in the same room where she died in real life. "It definitely took on elements of being like a seance," Dominik said. Filming also started on August 4, 2019, the 57th anniversary of Monroe's death. De Armas said at the press conference that she believes Monroe's ghost was close to them on set. "I think she was happy. She would also throw things off the wall sometimes and get mad if she didn't like something. Maybe this sounds very mystical, but it is true. We all felt it." De Armas later told AnOther magazine that everyone in the crew wrote a message to Monroe in a big card, then they went to the cemetery and put it on her grave. "We were asking for permission in a way. Everyone felt a huge responsibility, and we were very aware of the side of the story we were going to tell—the story of Norma Jeane, the person behind this character, Marilyn Monroe. Who was she really?", she said.

Much of Blonde's cinematography is digitally shot in black and white; other portions of the film are in color, aspect ratios (1:1, 1.37:1, 1.85:1, 2.39:1) shift to depict historical usage. Many scenes are visual homages to classic photographs of Monroe by notable photographers. Blonde was set to premiere at 2021 Venice Film Festival, but Netflix was unhappy with the final cut it received, and hired Jennifer Lame to help.

Real footage from Monroe's filmography is used in this movie mixed in with scenes recreated by Ana de Armas, who was placed in the films All About Eve (1950), Don't Bother to Knock (1952), Niagara (1953), Gentlemen Prefer Blondes (1953), and Some Like It Hot (1959). Andrew Dominik said that he initially failed to obtain permission from Metro-Goldwyn-Mayer to use footage from their films, so he had to recreate some scenes, such as the scene with de Armas and Tony Curtis in Some Like It Hot, which he shot with an actor playing Curtis in case he couldn't get permission to use the original footage. Dominik was allowed to use the footage after an MGM executive was fired and was replaced by Michael De Luca, who finally gave him permission to use the film clip.

=== Music ===
The score was composed and performed by long-time collaborators Nick Cave and Warren Ellis, with the soundtrack album released on September 28, 2022.

== Release ==
Blonde had its world premiere in-competition at the 79th Venice International Film Festival on September 8, 2022, followed by a screening at the 48th Deauville American Film Festival. It was released on Netflix on September 28, 2022, after an initial release date of September 23, 2022.

The film also had a limited theatrical release in New York City that began on September 16, 2022, and in other locations on September 23, 2022.

== Reception ==
=== Critical response ===
Metacritic review
breakdown (unweighted)

Positive
21 (37%)
Mixed
26 (46%)
Negative
10 (18%)

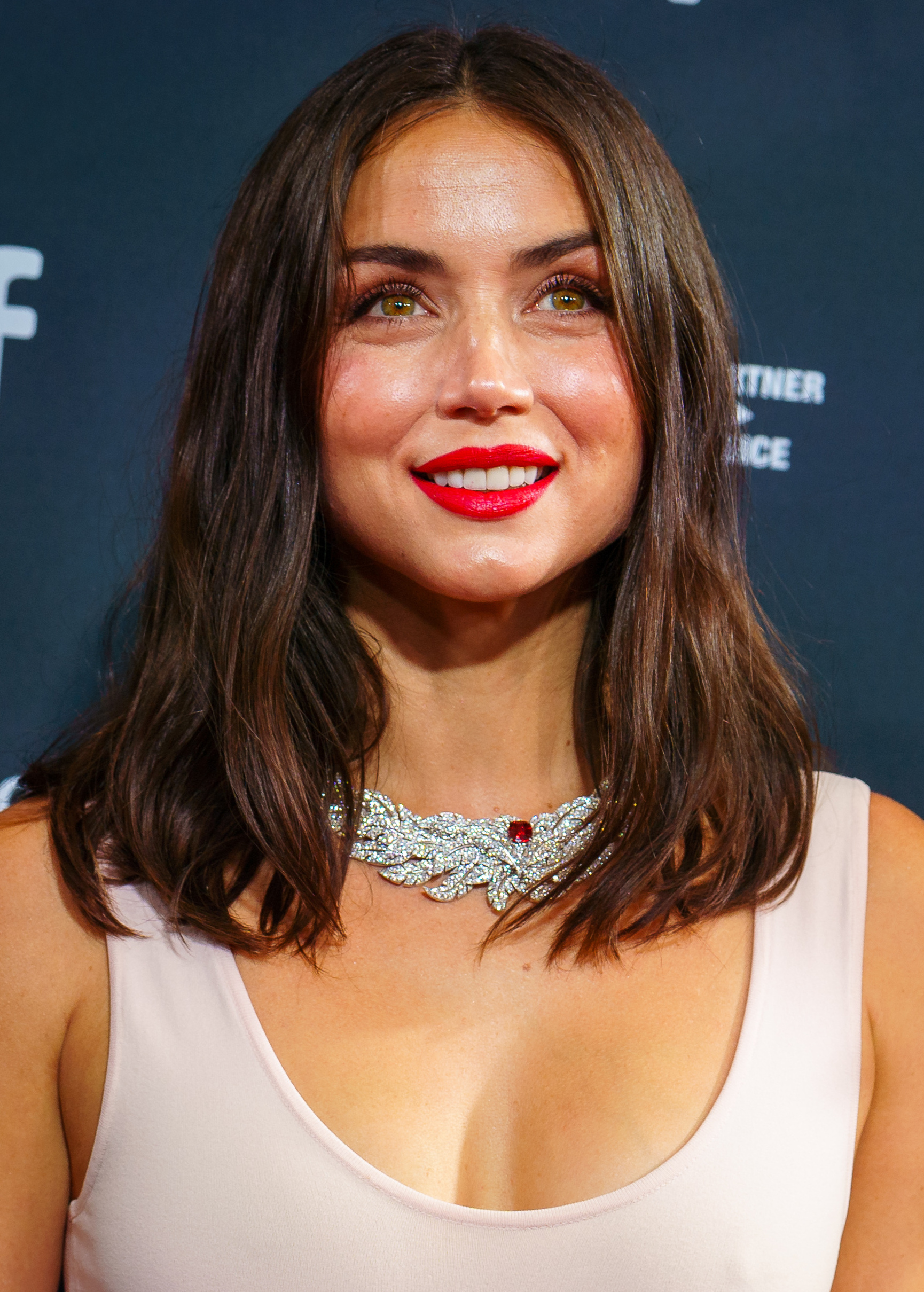
Ana de Armas received widespread acclaim for her portrayal of Monroe, which earned her an Academy Award nomination for Best Actress.

Blonde was controversial among critics and audiences alike and was described as a "complicated, highly divisive film". Praise was directed towards de Armas's performance, but the response to the writing and Dominik's depiction of Monroe's life divided critics; some found the film's spin on the traditional biopic refreshing, while others criticized it as exploitative, sexist, and dehumanizing. On the review aggregator website Rotten Tomatoes, Blonde holds a rating of 42% based on 318 reviews, with an average of 5.5/10. The site's critics consensus reads: "Ana de Armas' luminous performance makes it difficult to look away, but Blonde can be hard to watch as it teeters between commenting on exploitation and contributing to it." On Metacritic, which uses a weighted average, the film has a score of 50 out of 100, based on 57 critics, indicating "mixed or average" reviews.

Reviewing the film following its world premiere at Venice, where it received a 14-minute standing ovation, reducing de Armas to tears, Catherine Bray of Empire praised Dominik's visual style and de Armas' performance, but found the film failed at demystifying Monroe's life, writing: "The portrait that this film paints of Monroe depicts a little girl lost, who repeatedly calls her lovers 'Daddy' and reacts to almost every new setback with the same tremulously teary ingénue's pout." Vanity Fair's Richard Lawson found it a "fascinating alternative to the traditional biopic", commending the unconventional storytelling, direction, and de Armas' performance. Owen Gleiberman of Variety called de Armas' work "a performance ... of breathtaking shimmer and imagination and candor and heartbreak." Deadline Hollywood's Damon Wise stated the film is an "astonishing" way to tell Monroe's life in a fictional sense, as it is "presented as a horror movie in the surreal, nightmarish style" comparable to the films of David Lynch, especially Mulholland Drive (2001). In a very positive review, IGN's Siddhant Adlakha called the film a "dreamlike fictional biopic about Marilyn Monroe" that features "a stunning, volatile performance from Ana de Armas, whose daring vulnerability is matched by director Andrew Dominik's equally daring formal approach".

David Rooney of The Hollywood Reporter called it "a must-see", yet also "a work of such wild excesses and questionable cruelty". In GQ, Jack King's review also noted how the film shifts from a "traditional biopic" to "a movie unrelenting in its brutality". The Guardian's Leslie Felperin described the film as "ravishing, moving and intensely irritating" but ultimately "all a bit much", and assigned it a rating of three stars out of five. In a mixed review for IndieWire, Sophie Monks Kaufman called the film a "bizarre, miserablist biopic", admiring de Armas' performance and the cinematography, but criticizing Dominik's portrayal of Monroe: "Dominik critiques the world for reducing his subject down to her topline assets—and then treats her in exactly the same way. His Marilyn is a sexy, breathy blonde with daddy issues. And that's all, folks."

The New York Times critic Manohla Dargis panned the film, criticizing the fact that "once again a director is more interested in examining [Monroe's] body (literally, in this case) than getting inside her mind" and writing "Given all the indignities and horrors that Marilyn Monroe endured during her 36 years, it is a relief that she didn't have to suffer through the vulgarities of Blonde, the latest necrophiliac entertainment to exploit her." In his negative review, Justin Chang from the Los Angeles Times stated that the film "isn't really about Marilyn Monroe. It's about making her suffer." He also opined that the film "turns Marilyn Monroe into an avatar of suffering, dwelling on her pain so obsessively that even the film's fleeting moments of empathy feel like another form of exploitation".

"At times, the movie feels like a slaughterhouse seen from the animal's point of view" wrote Bilge Ebiri in his review for Vulture, remarking on the film's tendency to elicit strong reactions and emotions from an audience by putting together what he described as a "captivating and terrifying" jigsaw puzzle of Monroe's life. Anthony Lane, in his review for The New Yorker, praised de Armas' performance and Dominik's visual style, but heavily criticized his portrayal of Monroe, ultimately concluding: "Bedazzling, overlong, and unjust, Blonde does a grave disservice to the woman whom it purports to honor." In a negative review for Slant Magazine, Jake Cole echoed Lane's sentiment, stating: "Blonde…is the worst kind of feminism, one so absorbed in the desire to 'save' a woman that it victimizes her as much as possible to make its redemption of her that much more praiseworthy."

Writing for Time, Stephanie Zacharek criticized Dominik for allowing "no room for the real-life Marilyn's multidimensionality", asserting that "Marilyn—the brilliant, perceptive if often difficult performer—is almost nowhere to be seen in Andrew Dominik's willfully clueless Freudian fantasy Blonde". Jessie Thompson of The Independent gave the film one star out of five, stating; "Blonde is not a bad film because it is degrading, exploitative and misogynist, even though it is all of those things. It's bad because it's boring, pleased with itself and doesn't have a clue what it's trying to say."

=== Industry reception ===
Joyce Carol Oates, the author of the novel on which the film is based, observed a rough cut of the film, and publicly stated: "I have seen the rough cut of Andrew Dominik's adaptation and it is startling, brilliant, very disturbing and perhaps most surprisingly an utterly 'feminist' interpretation... not sure that any male director has ever achieved anything [like] this."

Spanish director Pedro Almodóvar called Blonde a "great film" and praised Ana de Armas for portraying Monroe in "a chillingly real way". He later argued that de Armas deserved to win the Best Actress Oscar for her performance.

Actress Jamie Lee Curtis—who starred opposite Ana de Armas in Knives Out (2019), and whose father, Tony Curtis, starred opposite Monroe in Some Like It Hot (1959) and is featured in Blonde—was impressed with de Armas' performance, after also seeing an early cut: "I dropped to the floor. I couldn't believe it. Ana was completely gone. She was Marilyn." Brad Pitt, who co-produced the film via his Plan B banner praised de Armas' performance, saying "She is phenomenal in it. That's a tough dress to fill. It was 10 years in the making. It wasn't until we found Ana that we could get it across the finish line". Actor Casey Affleck also praised the film, stating, "I've seen a couple of versions of Blonde and it's taken him [Dominik] a long time to get it out into the world. But that's just how he is. He's so slow with it. And it's an amazing, beautiful film."

Suzie Kennedy, an English Marilyn Monroe impersonator and historian for over 20 years, openly despised the film, calling it "a terrible movie... an absolute assassination of Marilyn Monroe's legacy... an assassination of an icon," and that it "capitalized on and exploited the deep sadness of Marilyn's life."

=== Cast ===
Upon the trailers' release, de Armas' casting as Monroe received some backlash as some viewers felt her ethnic background did not entirely match Monroe's, with complaints that she still maintained her native Cuban accent. Regarding her accent, Dominik told Screen Daily in February 2022 that there was "work involved" in making the actress "sound American". Monroe's official estate defended de Armas' casting, stating, "Marilyn Monroe is a singular Hollywood and pop culture icon that transcends generations and history. Any actor that steps into that role knows they have big shoes to fill. Based on the trailer alone, it looks like Ana was a great casting choice as she captures Marilyn's glamour, humanity and vulnerability. We can't wait to see the film in its entirety!"

=== NC-17 rating ===
Blonde sparked some controversy when its NC-17 rating (meaning adults only) was confirmed, raising concerns that it would be exploitative in its depiction of Monroe. The film itself features graphic scenes of sexual abuse, including a rape scene, as well as Monroe having an abortion, and a miscarriage. Writing for Jezebel, Kady Ruth Ashcroft remarked on how the rating's relationship with Monroe's enduring status as a sex symbol in pop culture prevents the film from achieving its goal of humanizing her, concluding: "Blonde's NC-17 rating is intended as both a warning and restriction as to who can handle the film's mature content. It also acts like a tease—just how scandalous was this sexpot's life anyways?—in a way that may prevent the movie from shrinking Monroe the myth back down to Norma Jean [sic]."

Speaking on the rating in an interview with Screen Daily, Andrew Dominik stated, "It's a demanding movie—it is what it is, it says what it says. And if the audience doesn't like it, that's the fucking audience's problem. It's not running for public office," adding, "If I look at an episode of Euphoria, it's far more graphic than anything going on in Blonde". In an interview with fashion magazine L'Officiel Italia, de Armas echoed the sentiment, saying, "I don't understand why it happened. I can cite a number of programs or movies that are much more explicit and with a lot more sexual content than Blonde. But to tell this story it's important to show all those moments in Marilyn's life that brought her to the end she did. It needs to be explained. In the cast everyone knew we should delve into unpleasant territory, it wasn't just up to me". Delving into what Dominik's vision for the film was, de Armas told Rotten Tomatoes, "Andrew's ambitions were very clear from the start—to present a version of Marilyn Monroe's life through her lens. He wanted the world to experience what it actually felt like to not only be Marilyn, but also Norma Jeane. I found that to be the most daring, unapologetic, and feminist take on her story that I had ever seen." She added, "Our movie is not linear or conventional; it is meant to be a sensorial and emotional experience. The film moves along with her feelings and her experiences. There are moments when we are inside of her body and mind, and this will give the audience an opportunity to experience what it was like to be Norma and Marilyn at the same time."

In a piece for GQ, Keith Phipps argues that Blonde, being an exception from the commercial stigma of having an NC-17 rating due to its exclusive release on a streaming platform, could usher in a new era of films and filmmakers that will "push beyond the restrictions of the R rating", writing, "In theory, the NC-17 rating could thrive on services like Netflix, Hulu, and HBO Max and Blonde could be a sign of things to come, possibly serving as a cue for other filmmakers to push beyond the restrictions of the R rating."

=== Criticism about depiction of abortion ===
Writing for IndieWire, Samantha Bergeson claimed the film makes an anti-abortion statement by showing a CGI fetus talking to Monroe. Charles Pulliam-Moore wrote for The Verge that Blonde's CGI fetus "is anti-abortion propaganda dressed up as art", and called it "a judgmental CGI fetus who sometimes talks to Marilyn Monroe from within her uterus to shame her for having had an abortion in the past." A sentiment shared by abortion rights activists such as Caren Spruch, national director of arts and entertainment engagement at the Planned Parenthood Federation of America, who called it "medically inaccurate descriptions of fetuses and pregnancy" in a statement to The Washington Post. Steph Herold, who researches reproductive health at the University of California at San Francisco and studies abortion depiction in films and television shows, said the scene in which Monroe's character speaks to the fetus "totally infantilized her in ways that I've only seen in anti-abortion propaganda-type movies," Herold said; "I was pretty shocked by it, especially given the platform and the mainstream quality of this movie."

Planned Parenthood accused the film of delivering an anti-abortion message about Monroe's abortion, releasing the following statement to The Hollywood Reporter saying the film was rooted in anti-abortion propaganda;

"As film and TV shapes many people's understanding of sexual and reproductive health, it's critical these depictions accurately portray women's real decisions and experiences. While abortion is safe, essential health care, anti-abortion zealots have long contributed to abortion stigma by using medically inaccurate descriptions of fetuses and pregnancy. Andrew Dominik's new film, 'Blonde,' bolsters their message with a CGI-talking fetus, depicted to look like a fully-formed baby."

There is no evidence that Monroe ever had an abortion, much less forced procedures as it was portrayed in the movie, according to historian Michelle Vogel, author of Marilyn Monroe: Her Films, Her Life. "Any talk of pregnancy termination is an assumption on our part. Marilyn loved children and she was desperate to be a mother. Sadly, she never carried a baby to term." It is well-documented that Monroe suffered three miscarriages during her marriage to Arthur Miller; in 1956, in 1957, and again in 1958. In the 1993 biography Marilyn Monroe: The Biography written by Donald Spoto, Monroe's gynecologist, Dr. Leon Krohn, stated; "the rumors of her multiple abortions are ridiculous. She never had even one."

Andrew Dominik denied the film is anti-abortion, saying in a statement to TheWrap:

"I don't think the movie is anti-pro choice. I don't think it is at all. And I'm not convinced that she actually wants to have a baby. I think she has feelings about not having a baby, but I'm not convinced that what she's doing – I mean, she doesn't end up having one. […] There's a wish for baby but there's a fear of baby, and I think that's kind of the central stressor on her."

The Catholic World Report called Blonde "unwittingly pro-life".

=== Accolades ===
Accolades for Blonde
Award	Date of ceremony	Category	Recipient(s)	Result	Ref.
Venice Film Festival	September 10, 2022	Golden Lion	Andrew Dominik	Nominated	
Chicago Film Critics Association	December 14, 2022	Best Actress	Ana de Armas	Nominated	
Golden Globe Awards	January 10, 2023	Best Actress in a Motion Picture – Drama	Ana de Armas	Nominated	
London Film Critics' Circle	February 5, 2023	Actress of the Year	Ana de Armas	Nominated	
London Film Critics' Circle	February 5, 2023	Technical Achievement Award	Leslie Shatz	Nominated	
Make-Up Artists and Hair Stylists Guild	February 11, 2023	Best Period and/or Character Make-Up in a Feature-Length Motion Picture	Tina Roesler Kerwin, Elena Arroy, and Cassie Lyons	Nominated	
Make-Up Artists and Hair Stylists Guild	February 11, 2023	Best Period Hair Styling and/or Character Hair Styling in a Feature-Length Motion Picture	Jaime Leigh McIntosh, Lynnae Duley, Ahou Mofid, and Robert Pickens	Nominated	
British Academy Film Awards	February 19, 2023	Best Actress in a Leading Role	Ana de Armas	Nominated	
AACTA International Awards	February 24, 2023	Best Actress	Ana de Armas	Nominated	
Actor Awards	February 26, 2023	Outstanding Performance by a Female Actor in a Leading Role	Ana de Armas	Nominated	
Golden Raspberry Awards	March 11, 2023	Worst Picture	Dede Gardner, Jeremy Kleiner, and Brad Pitt	Won	
Golden Raspberry Awards	March 11, 2023	Worst Director	Andrew Dominik	Nominated	
Golden Raspberry Awards	March 11, 2023	Worst Supporting Actor	Xavier Samuel	Nominated	
Golden Raspberry Awards	March 11, 2023	Worst Supporting Actor	Evan Williams	Nominated	
Golden Raspberry Awards	March 11, 2023	Worst Screenplay	Andrew Dominik; Based on the novel by Joyce Carol Oates	Won	
Golden Raspberry Awards	March 11, 2023	Worst Screen Combo	Andrew Dominik and his issues with women	Nominated	
Golden Raspberry Awards	March 11, 2023	Worst Screen Combo	Both real life characters in the fallacious White House bedroom scene	Nominated	
Golden Raspberry Awards	March 11, 2023	Worst Remake, Rip-off or Sequel	Blonde	Nominated	
Academy Awards	March 12, 2023	Best Actress	Ana de Armas	Nominated	
Actors and Actresses Union Awards	March 13, 2023	Best Actress in an International Production	Ana de Armas	Won	
Golden Trailer Awards	June 29, 2023	Best Teaser	"Official Teaser" (Empire Design)	Nominated	
Golden Trailer Awards	June 29, 2023	Best Original Score	"Official Teaser" (Empire Design)	Nominated	

== See also ==
- Marilyn Monroe in popular culture
- Cultural depictions of John F. Kennedy
- Blonde, the 2001 film
- My Week with Marilyn, another Monroe biopic
- Extreme cinema
