= The Way Home (TV series) =

2023 fantasy drama television series

- Genre: Fantasy drama; Time travel
- Created by: Heather Conkie; Alexandra Clarke; Marly Reed
- Starring: Chyler Leigh; Evan Williams; Sadie Laflamme-Snow; Andie MacDowell
- Countries of origin: Canada; United States
- Original language: English
- No. of seasons: 4
- No. of episodes: 40

Production
- Executive producers: Marly Reed; Arnie Zipursky; Lauren MacKinlay; Hannah Pillemer; Fernando Szew; Larry Grimaldi; Heather Conkie; Alexandra Clarke; Andie MacDowell; Chyler Leigh; Susanne Berger
- Producer: John Calvert
- Cinematography: Thom Best
- Editor: Ric Thomas
- Running time: 43 minutes
- Production companies: Hallmark Channel; MarVista Entertainment; Neshama Entertainment

Original release
- Network: Hallmark Channel
- Release: January 15, 2023 – June 21, 2026

The Way Home is a fantasy drama television series created by Heather Conkie, Alexandra Clarke, and Marly Reed. The series stars Chyler Leigh, Evan Williams, Sadie Laflamme-Snow, and Andie MacDowell and it premiered on January 15, 2023.

On March 6, 2025, Hallmark renewed the series for a fourth season, which premiered on April 19, 2026. On November 20, 2025, People reported that the fourth season of The Way Home would be its last.

== Premise ==
The series is a time travel drama about the lives of three generations of strong, willful and independent Landry women who embark on a journey to find their way back to each other while learning important lessons about their family's past.

== Cast and characters ==
=== Main ===
- Chyler Leigh as Katherine "Kat" Landry, Alice's mother and Del's daughter with Colton
  - Alex Hook as teenage and young adult Kat Landry
- Evan Williams as mature Elliot "El" Augustine, a close friend of the Landry family, Alice's physics teacher and Katherine's love interest in the present
  - David Webster as teenage and young adult Elliot "El" Augustine
- Sadie Laflamme-Snow as Alice "Ali" Dhawan, Katherine's daughter and Del's granddaughter
- Andie MacDowell as Delilah "Del" Watson Landry, Katherine's mother and Alice's maternal grandmother
  - Julia Tomasone as teenage and young adult Del Watson in 1974-1983 (seasons 3–4)

=== Recurring ===
- Remy Smith as child Jacob "Jake" Landry, Delilah's son and Katherine's younger brother, who went missing in 1999 and was eventually presumed dead. It was revealed in the season 1 finale that he followed a stray dog to the pond, fell in, and was sent back in time to 1790.
  - Spencer MacPherson as mature Jacob "Jake" Landry (seasons 2–4) in 1814 and the present
- Jefferson Brown as mature Colton "Cole" Landry, Delilah's late husband and Katherine and Jacob's father who died in a mysterious accident in 2000 and could also time travel
  - Jordan Doww as teenage Colton "Cole" Landry in 1974–1983 (seasons 3–4)
  - Lincoln Reign McCaffrey as Colton "Cole" Landry as a child (seasons 2–3)
- Al Mukadam as mature Brady Dhawan, Katherine's ex-husband and Alice's father, a rich lawyer who lives in Minneapolis with his new girlfriend Rachel, who is never shown on screen
  - Siddharth Sharma as teenage and young adult Brady Dhawan
- Nigel Whitmey as Byron Groff (season 1), the former owner of the Port Haven, New Brunswick newspaper
- Samora Smallwood as mature Monica Hill, a frenemy of Katherine's in high school and a resident of Port Haven who runs a diner
  - Monique Jasmine Paul as teenage Monica Hill
- Kataem O'Connor as Spencer Hill, a student at Alice's new high school and Monica's son
- Ali Prijono as Zoey (season 1), a student at Alice's new high school and Spencer's girlfriend
- Marnie McPhail-Diamond as Rita Richards, a close friend of Delilah's
- Baeyen Hoffman as child Danny Sawyer, Jacob's best friend in 1999
  - Peyson Rock as mature Danny Sawyer
- Samuel Braun as teenage Nick Oates, Alice's boyfriend in 1999 and Elliot's other best friend
  - Kerry James as mature Nick Oates
- Alex Mallari Jr. as Andy Stafford (season 1): a veterinarian in Port Haven who Monica introduces to Katherine
- Laura de Carteret as Joyce (season 1), Nick's mother and co-owner, with Jude, of the Roxy movie theater
- Megan Fahlenbock as Jude (season 1), Nick's mother and Joyce's same-sex partner
- Kris Holden-Ried as Thomas Coyle (seasons 2–4), a citizen of Port Haven, Jacob's friend and Katherine's love interest in 1814/1816
- Stuart Hughes as Elijah Landry (seasons 2–4), Jacob's adoptive father in 1814 and ancestor of the Landrys in the present
- Watson Rose as Susanna Augustine (seasons 2–4), Elliot's ancestor and later a friend of Katherine's in 1814/1816
- Vaughan Murrae as KC Goodwin (seasons 2–4), Katherine Landry's new summer intern at The Herald newspaper, the nonbinary teenage grandchild of recently deceased town matriarch Evelyn Goodwin. KC Goodwin is revealed to be a time traveler in season 3.
- Alexander Eling as Noah LeBlanc (seasons 2–4), a high school graduate who works for Fish & Chips Truck and Alice's love interest in the present
- Rob Stewart as Sam Bishop (seasons 2–4), the new owner of the land adjacent to the Landry farm and Delilah's love interest in the present
- Devin Cecchetto as teenage Evelyn "Evie" Goodwin (seasons 3–4)
  - Susan Hamann as mature Evelyn "Evie" Goodwin (guest seasons 2–3)
  - River Price-Maenpaa as Evelyn "Evie" Goodwin as a child (season 3)
- James Gallanders as mature Vic Augustine, Elliot's estranged father who has a longstanding grudge against the "high and mighty" Landry family
  - Grayson Gallanders as child Vic Augustine in 1974 (season 3)
  - Léo Pady as young Vic Augustine (season 4)
- Mark Ballantyn as Rick Augustine, Victor's teenage elder brother who died in a car accident in 1974 (season 3)
  - Hawthorne Wilde Fowler as Rick Augustine as a child (season 3)
- Jill Frappier as Fern Landry, Colton's paternal grandmother in 1974–1983 (seasons 3–4)
  - Bianca Melchior as young Fern Landry, Colton's paternal grandmother in 1925 and 1926 (season 4)
- Dale Whibley as Max Goodwin (seasons 3–4)
- Hannah Storey as teenage Tessa Cooper, Elliot's mother, in 1974 (season 3)
  - Kelsey Falconer as Tessa Cooper, Elliot's mother (season 4)
  - Megan Follows as mature Tessa Cooper, Elliot's mother in 1925 (season 4)
- Miranda Millar as Emma Baker, Elliot's ex-wife (season 3)
- Blair Kincaid as Morris "Little Mo" Augustine, Elliot's great-grandfather (season 4)
- Erik Knudsen as Percival Augustine (season 4)
- Dan Jeannotte as Cliff Kane (season 4)
- Gabriel Hogan as Grayson Goodwin, Evelyn's grandfather (season 4)

== Episodes ==
Season	Episodes	Originally shown	
Season	Episodes	First shown	Last shown
1	10	January 15, 2023	March 26, 2023
2	10	January 21, 2024	March 31, 2024
3	10	January 3, 2025	March 7, 2025
4	10	April 19, 2026	June 21, 2026

=== Season 1 (2023) ===
No. overall	No. in season	Title	Directed by	Written by	Original showing	U.S. viewers (millions)
1	1	"Mothers and Daughters"	Grant Harvey	Story by : Marly Reed and Heather Conkie & Alexandra Clarke; Teleplay by : Heather Conkie & Alexandra Clarke	January 15, 2023	1.44
The episode begins in 1814, with a woman dressed in white being chased through the woods by an angry mob accusing her of being a witch. She escapes by jumping into a pond, but doesn't resurface. In the present, Katherine loses her job and her teenage daughter Alice gets expelled from school. With Katherine's marriage breaking up, it all leads them to move in with her mother, Delilah who she has been estranged from for 20 years. When she learns her parents' marriage is over, Alice runs away into the woods near the farm. After falling into a pond, she finds herself on a surprising journey to the past where she encounters her mother as a teenager.
2	2	"Scar Tissue"	Grant Harvey	Alexandra Clarke	January 22, 2023	1.54
Katherine is presented with a book deal that requires her to dredge up terrible memories. After meeting Katherine's best friend Elliot, Alice returns from the past and discovers that he has the memory of her visits in the past and he counsels her to be cautious. Delilah wants to say goodbye to the past and holds a memorial service for Jacob – her son who disappeared 20 years ago. Alice yearns to return to the past to understand what happened.
3	3	"I Don't Want to Miss a Thing"	Nimisha Mukerji	Jessica Runck	January 29, 2023	1.39
Alice falls in love with the past and has her first kiss with a boy named Nick. Her friendship with Katherine in the past continues to grow. In the present, Katherine starts a job with the local newspaper, while Delilah deals with bittersweet memories attached to Colton's boat. Katherine sees Alice enter the pond and goes in after her when she doesn't come back up.
4	4	"What's My Age Again?"	Nimisha Mukerji	Kyle Hart	February 5, 2023	1.56
In Katherine's first visit to the past, she sees her past self interacting with Alice and other members of her family. Alice double dates with her teenage parents. In the present, Delilah swallows her pride to ask for help.
5	5	"Don't Dream It's Over"	Grant Harvey	Marly Reed	February 19, 2023	1.31
In the present, Katherine and Elliot chaperone their old high school's "Back to the '90s" dance; Alice searches for a piece of her past. Elliot sees Katherine and Brady sharing a passionate kiss, not knowing that afterward they agree they can't make the marriage work. Delilah says goodbye to more memories as a local landmark closes its doors.
6	6	"Building a Mystery"	Grant Harvey	Heather Conkie	February 26, 2023	1.52
Mature Katherine and Alice unsuccessfully try to prevent Jacob's disappearance in 1999. In the present, The town's decision to hold a carnival that has been cancelled for years as it was the day Jacob disappeared and that causes Del to relive those memories, but she realizes that the tragedy of Jacob was not hers alone but the whole town's and moves towards healing. Del and Katherine speak with Danny (Jacob's friend) about the disappearance and learn that he may have fallen off a cliff, leading Kat to think she could go back and change things. She finds him in time in the past, but her attempt fails.
7	7	"The End of the World as We Know It"	Shamim Sarif	Tally Yong Knoll and Kyle Hart	March 5, 2023	1.57
Several months after Jacob's disappearance, Alice goes to a New Year's Eve Y2K party to support her friend, teenage Katherine. In the present, Katherine finds a new mystery about her father, while Delilah reveals an old secret about him that's troubled her, and Elliott and Katherine finally admit to feelings for each other.
8	8	"Lovefool"	Shamim Sarif	Marly Reed	March 12, 2023	1.43
When her old boyfriend returns to Port Haven in the present, Alice realizes her relationship with him has no future. Katherine is shocked by family secrets, while Delilah tries to take a chance with Byron.
9	9	"The Day the Music Died"	Norma Bailey	Alexandra Clarke	March 19, 2023	1.61
Alice says goodbye to the past, knowing she needs to make a life in the present. Katherine unsuccessfully tries to stop her father's death in 2000. In the present, Delilah revisits old memories in a new light.
10	10	"Not All Who Wander Are Lost"	Norma Bailey	Heather Conkie	March 26, 2023	1.74
Teenage Katherine and Alice attend Colton's funeral in 2000, while mature Katherine watches it from a distance. In the present, Delilah goes to the grief group and makes peace with her memory of Colton, while Katherine has a new theory about what happened to Jacob.

=== Season 2 (2024) ===
No. overall	No. in season	Title	Directed by	Written by	Original showing	U.S. viewers (millions)
11	1	"The Space Between"	Grant Harvey	Alexandra Clarke	January 21, 2024	1.25
Elliott has left town to come to grips with his future without Kat. Kat has taken over the local paper and she learns that the last woman of an old town family has left some of her estate to the paper. There she discovers a portrait from 1814 that looks like her. Del re-creates traditions of the past. Alice misses her friends. Kat continues to grapple with Jacob's mystery in the wake of losing Elliot.
12	2	"Hanging by a Moment"	Grant Harvey	Heather Conkie	January 28, 2024	1.16
Del considers the future of Landry Farm in the present. Kat searches for answers through the past and believes she can find Jacob there in 1814. She realizes she was the lady in the 1814 portrait. Alice tries to make peace with Elliot in both the present and the past.
13	3	"When You Were Young"	Shamim Sarif	Marly Reed	February 4, 2024	1.19
The Landry women and Elliot reflect on what it means to grow up as they hang on to memories from their younger days while accepting who they have become. Del meets her new neighbor that is involved with her land lease. Later she finds a loose horse, and takes him in, enjoying the chance to have one again. Then she discovers that it belongs to her neighbor.
14	4	"Wake Me Up When September Ends"	Shamim Sarif	Michael Hanley & Masooma Hussain	February 18, 2024	1.03
Alice reevaluates the past and her friendship with Elliot. They agree that she not tell teenage Elliott what she knows from the future. In 1814, Kat meets and befriends Suzanna, a healer and one of Elliott's ancestors, who tells her that history is told by winners and there is no historical trace of Jacob from that time. Kat also learns that Suzanna is engaged to Jacob. Brady orchestrates an elaborate production to propose to Kat, but she is overwhelmed by the display and declines. Afterwards when they are alone, she accepts. Alice gets a chance to see Nick again.
15	5	"Long Time Gone"	Grant Harvey	Alexandra Clarke	February 25, 2024	1.14
At the fall festival in the past, Elliott's father gets drunk, takes the mic, and goes on a public rant about how his family doesn't get the credit it deserves in the town. Kat and Elliott discover the path that Jacob was taken to return home in the distant past, and Kat returns there to await him. When his ship comes in, Jacob is immediately arrested and carried off by British soldiers while Kat watches.
16	6	"How to Save a Life"	Grant Harvey	Heather Conkie	March 3, 2024	1.24
Del gets word that remains have been found that could be Jacob's. Kat returns to Jacob's time and finds out that he was abducted not by British soldiers, but by the owner of the boat who was in league with Thomas to steal from the British and let Jacob take the blame. The owner, Cyrus, was someone that Suzanna had refused to marry, and this could be revenge. Thomas, Suzanna, and Kat break into Cyrus's house to try and free Jacob. Kat distracts the men and escapes through the pond, resulting in the same scene that began the series in season 1 episode 1.
17	7	"Somewhere Only We Know"	Shamim Sarif	Elyne Quan and Marly Reed	March 10, 2024	1.08
Alice becomes interested in a party in 2007 at a property called Lingermore that resulted in the owner becoming a recluse, and now the property is for sale. Suzanna is trying to nurse Jacob back to health from a bad beating and Cyrus's men are hunting for Kat, believing her to be a witch. She confesses to Thomas that she is a time traveler.
18	8	"Lose Yourself"	Shamim Sarif	Marly Reed	March 17, 2024	1.11
Alice discovers that Kat and Elliott were planning to run away to London, but Brady showed up before they could get away. Brady and Elliott began to fight and Kat got hurt trying to break them up. Nick returns to town and discovers the truth about the time travel and Alice's identity.
19	9	"Here Without You"	John Fawcett	Alexandra Clarke	March 24, 2024	1.09
Kat learns the story of how Jacob was discovered by his family in the past. Jacob tells Kat that most of his life is in the past and he doesn't want to return home. Elliott and Kat's plan to go to NY is squashed when Kat learns she is pregnant. Nick and Alice finally talk about their relationship in the past. Kat finds documentation that Thomas, who took Jacob's place in service to Cyrus, was executed by British soldiers and decides she needs to travel back to say goodbye.
20	10	"Bring Me to Life"	John Fawcett	Heather Conkie	March 31, 2024	1.36
Del makes arrangements to sell the farm. Alice and Elliott try a new theory on how the pond works and they are able to travel back together. El runs into Colton in Summer 1999 and they both work on the club house together. In present time, El and Alice find something that helps Del and Kat mend old fences, the undelivered letter for Del from young-adult Kat with an open ended ticket to fly to Minneapolis. Both thought the other did not want to see each other, when the reality is they both did want to see each other. When Alice shows this to them, they make up.

=== Season 3 (2025) ===
No. overall	No. in season	Title	Directed by	Written by	Original showing	Viewers (millions)
21	1	"You Ain't Seen Nothing Yet"	Grant Harvey	Heather Conkie	January 3, 2025	0.86
22	2	"The Way We Were"	Grant Harvey	Alexandra Clarke	January 10, 2025	0.79
23	3	"Live and Let Die"	Michelle Latimer	Marly Reed	January 17, 2025	0.69
24	4	"I'll Have to Say I Love You in a Song"	Michelle Latimer	Jessica Runck	January 24, 2025	0.70
25	5	"Reeling in the Years"	Grant Harvey	Alexandra Clarke	January 31, 2025	0.62
26	6	"Ain't No Sunshine"	Grant Harvey	Heather Conkie	February 7, 2025	0.66
27	7	"Tell Me Something Good"	Norma Bailey	Michael Hanley	February 14, 2025	0.61
28	8	"Smoke on the Water"	Norma Bailey	Marly Reed	February 21, 2025	0.64
29	9	"Too Late to Turn Back Now"	Grant Harvey	Heather Conkie	February 28, 2025	0.59
30	10	"If You Could Read My Mind"	Grant Harvey	Alexandra Clarke	March 7, 2025	0.71

=== Season 4 (2026) ===
No. overall	No. in season	Title	Directed by	Written by	Original showing	Viewers (millions)
31	1	"Show Me the Way to Go Home"	Grant Harvey	Alexandra Clarke	April 19, 2026	0.73
32	2	"Blinded by the Light"	Grant Harvey	Heather Conkie	April 26, 2026	0.77
33	3	"Dust in the Wind"	Michelle Latimer	Marly Reed	May 3, 2026	0.64
34	4	"We've Got Tonight"	Michelle Latimer	Jessica Runck	May 10, 2026	0.64
35	5	"Don't Cry Out Loud"	Thom Best	Alexandra Clarke	May 17, 2026	0.63
36	6	"Yes Sir, That's My Baby"	Grant Harvey	Heather Conkie	May 24, 2026	0.63
37	7	"Working My Way Back to You"	Michelle Latimer	Marly Reed	May 31, 2026	0.75
38	8	"Tainted Love"	Michelle Latimer	Michael Hanley	June 7, 2026	0.71
39	9	"Auld Lang Syne"	Grant Harvey	Heather Conkie	June 14, 2026	0.78
40	10	"Ahead by a Century"	Grant Harvey	Alexandra Clarke	June 21, 2026	0.79

== Critical reception ==
The first season of The Way Home holds an 100% approval rating on review aggregator website Rotten Tomatoes based on 5 reviews, with an average score of 7.5/10.
