= Summerstock Conservatory =

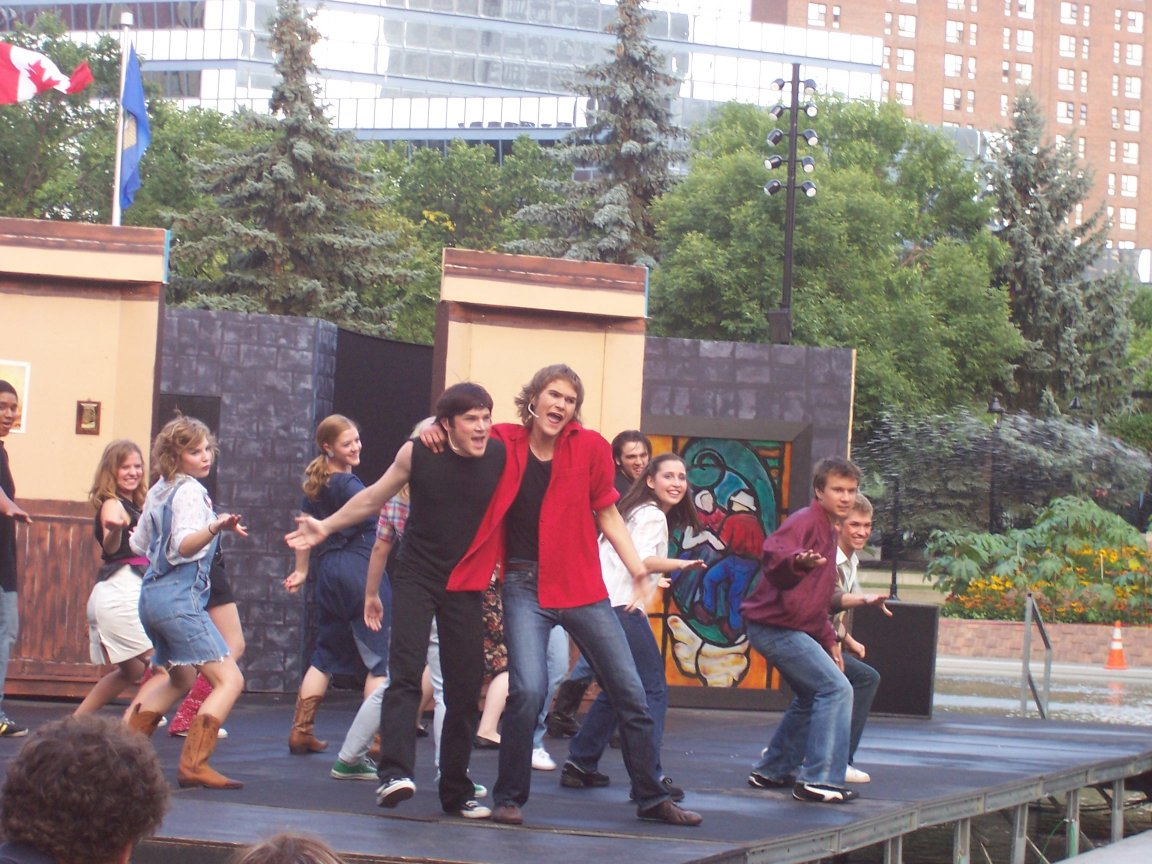
- Opening night of 2007's production of Footloose at Olympic Plaza in Downtown Calgary.
- Formation: 2002
- Dissolved: 2012
- Headquarters: Westmount Charter School
- Location: Calgary, Alberta, Canada
- Executive Producer: Brandi Sedore
- Artistic Director: Jim Senft
- Website: www.summerstock.ca

Summerstock Conservatory was a theatre company based out of Westmount Charter School in Calgary, Alberta from 2002 to 2012. Every year, between 1 and 14 August, high school and young post-secondary students from across Canada performed a play in Olympic Plaza.

== History ==
Summerstock Conservatory, formally MainStage, was founded in 2002 by Jim Senft, who directed Summerstock's first show, Guys and Dolls. Other performances included Fiddler on the Roof in 2004, Annie Get Your Gun in 2005, and Footloose in 2007. Summerstock continued performing shows annually until the group disbanded in 2012.

== Directors and producers ==
While Jim Senft was the original director of Summerstock, he took a yearlong break in 2005 from the Calgary show, to branch out to Toronto to create another Summerstock Conservatory. Another running of Guys and Dolls was held in Toronto, produced and co-directed by Joan Mansfield, a professional theatre producer based in Toronto, during Calgary's production of Annie Get Your Gun. During that time, the current tech director in Calgary, Josh Collins, also took the position of artistic director. The following year, Jim Senft returned to Calgary, and continued to act as the artistic director of the program.

From the beginning of the program, the Executive Producer was Brandi Sedore, who was also a secretary at Westmount Charter School, where Summerstock held its rehearsals. However, in 2007, Brandi officially stepped down from her position and Kathryn Waters took over for the production of Footloose. Nonetheless, Brandi returned for the 2007–2008 year, and continued until Jayson Krause took over as Executive Producer for the 2010–2011 year.

== Educational aspects ==
Educational coursework for Summerstock was offered through Westmount Charter School, which awarded Alberta high school credits in courses relating to the activities of its cast and technical crew. Cast members were able to receive high school credit while performing in Summerstock. The company also provided a scholarship program for graduating cast members from its ticket sales. The company also offered financial compensation to certain university members each year, who worked for Summerstock during the summer, generally as lead cast members. Further, each year, contributing high schools received grants to help run their respective drama departments, offered through The Summerstock Foundation, the charitable arm of Summerstock.

== Summerstock Theatre Festival ==
The Summerstock Theatre Festival was an annual outdoor performance of a musical held in the Arts District in downtown Calgary, Alberta, Canada. Based on the premise of the traditional Summerstock Theatre, this program presented Broadway-style theatre outdoors at Olympic Plaza. Performers were Calgary high school and university students, who came home from all across Canada to perform Broadway musicals.

== See also ==
- Evan Williams, notable Summerstock alumnus
