= Westmount Charter School =

Gifted education K-12 charter school in Calgary, Canada

Location
- 728 - 32 Street N.W. (Elementary); 2215 Uxbridge Drive N.W. (Mid-High/Highschool); Calgary, Alberta, T2N 2V9 (Elementary), T2N 4Y3 (Mid-High); Canada; 51.071268°N 114.133165°W

Information
- School type: Charter
- Founded: 1996
- School board: Westmount Charter Board
- Superintendent: Joe Frank
- Principal: Adriana Klassen (Elementary) Graeme Finlay (Mid-High)
- Grades: K-12
- Language: English
- Colours: Purple, Gold
- Team name: Westmount Wild
- Website: www.westmountcharter.com

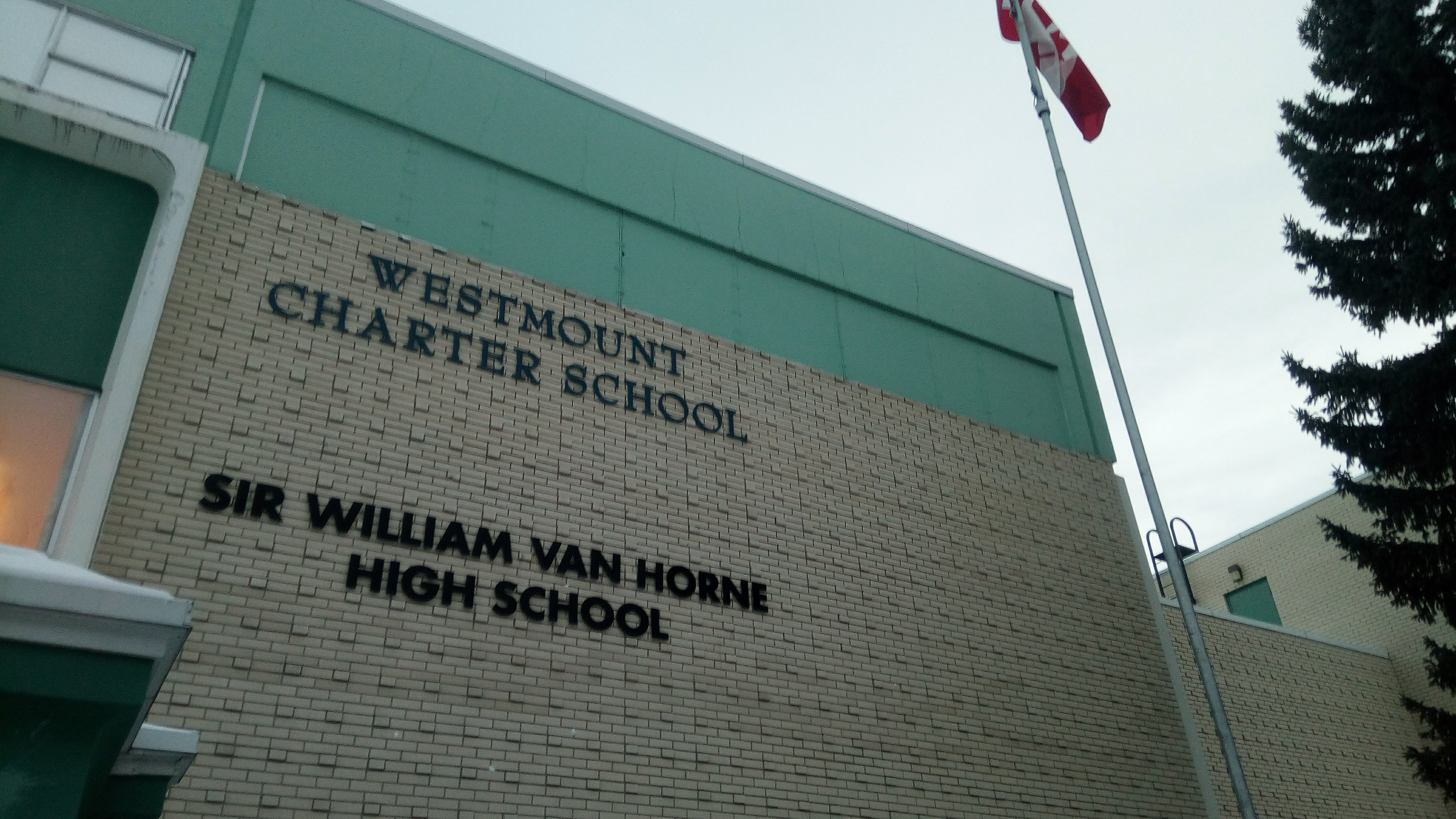
The mid-high campus

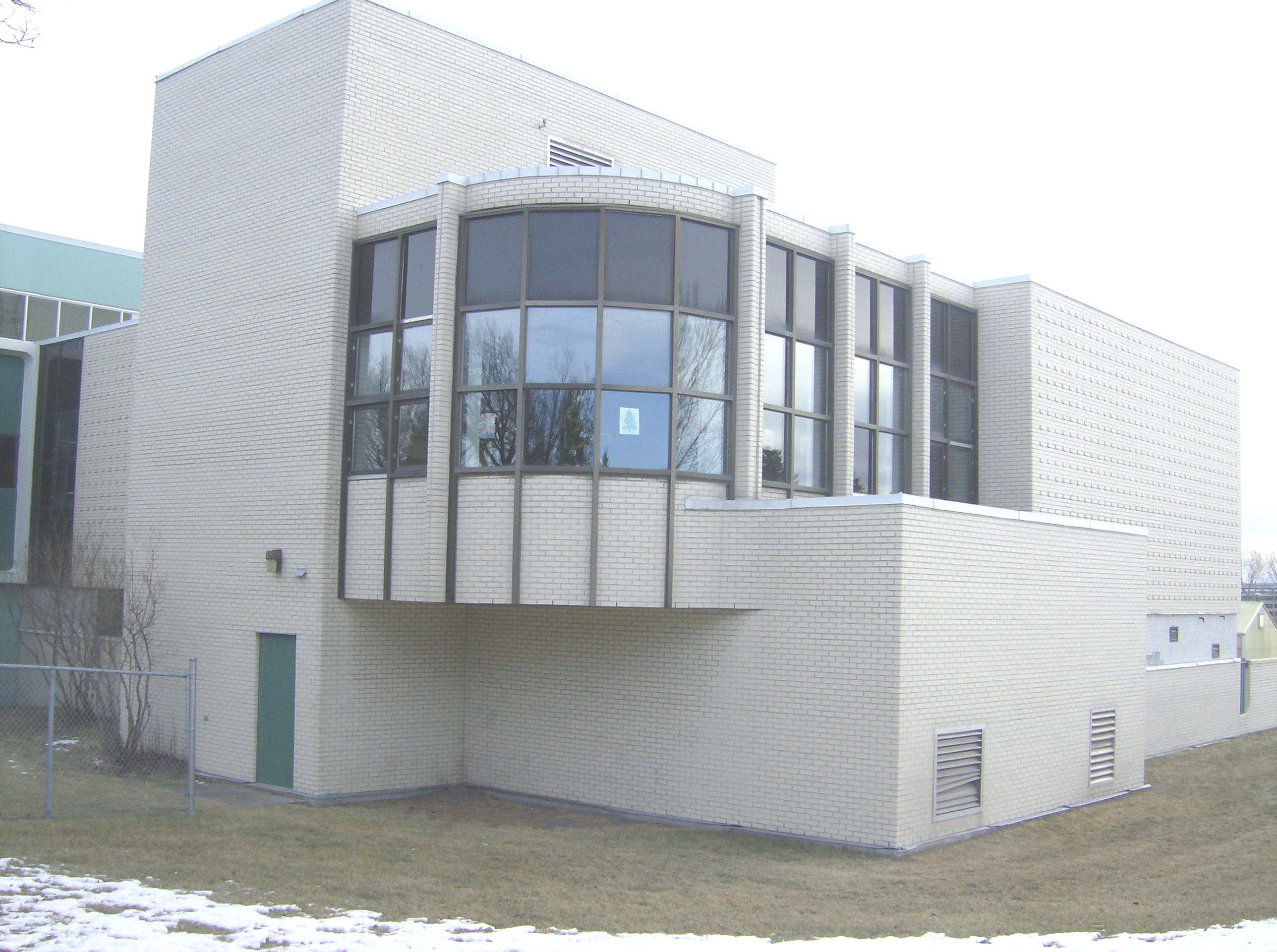
Part of the school building

Westmount Charter School is a charter school for gifted learners based in Calgary, Alberta, Canada, which educates students from kindergarten to grade 12. It was founded in 1996 as ABC (Action for Bright Children) Charter Public School by the Action for Bright Children Society.

The school started with 116 students, from grades one to three, and is now hosting a student body of approximately 1,300 in grades kindergarten through 12. The name was officially changed from ABC Charter Public School to Westmount Charter School in 2002, though the school remains publicly funded. Westmount's first graduation occurred in June 2006.

== Demographics ==
As of 2017, 25.1% of students at the elementary campus are speakers of English as a second language (ESL) and 13.5% have special needs. 19.9% of students at the mid-high campus are speakers of English as a second language and 13.4% have special needs. As of 2016–2017, Westmount is ranked the 9th best school in the last 5 years in Alberta by the Fraser Institute. Admission to the school requires a detailed academic history as well as a private psychological assessment in order to assess that the student is gifted.

== Admission ==
In order to be admitted, prospective students must undergo a third-party psychological assessment and intelligence testing, such as the WAIS, WPPSI, WISC or Stanford-Binet fifth edition. Prospective students should meet the recommended criteria for Gifted and Talented, which is a WAIS Full Scale IQ (FSIQ) score or a WAIS General Abilities Index (GAI) score of 130 (+/- 5), although admission criteria may be relaxed for external factors, such as empty seats, or for siblings of previously admitted students.

== Teams ==
Westmount has the following Mid-High Athletic sports teams:

- Badminton
- Basketball
- Cross-country running
- Golf
- Rugby - 7s (Senior Men's, Women's)
- Track and field
- Volleyball
- Wrestling
- Curling

And the following Mid-High Mental sports teams:

- Debate
- Model United Nations
- Speech
- Reach for the Top

== Facilities ==
Westmount Charter School started out in 1996 with a small building in Bridgeland as their home. They have since progressed through a building on the site of CFB Calgary from 1998 to 2001, then for ten years shared the Viscount Bennett Centre with Chinook Learning Services. In September 2011, Westmount moved to two buildings: Parkdale Elementary, which houses Kindergarten to Grade 4, and Sir William Van Horne High School in University Heights, which houses Grades 5 to 12. These buildings are leased from the Calgary Board of Education, the public school board of Calgary.

== See also ==
- Summerstock Conservatory
