= Goodnight for Justice: Queen of Hearts =

2013 TV film

- Promotional poster
- Genre: Western
- Created by: Luke Perry
- Written by: Luke Perry (characters)
- Screenplay by: Neal H. Dobrofsky; Tippi Dobrofsky
- Directed by: Martin Wood
- Starring: Luke Perry; Katharine Isabelle; Ricky Schroder
- Theme music composer: Graeme Coleman
- Country of origin: United States
- Original language: English

Production
- Producers: Luke Perry; Ira Pincus
- Cinematography: David Pelletier
- Editor: Ron Yoshida
- Running time: 87 minutes
- Production company: Hallmark Channel

Original release
- Network: Hallmark Movie Channel
- Release: January 26, 2013

Related
- Goodnight for Justice: The Measure of a Man

Goodnight for Justice: Queen of Hearts is a 2013 American Western television film directed by Martin Wood and starring Luke Perry, Katharine Isabelle, and Ricky Schroder. Written by Neal and Tippi Dobrofsky, based on characters created by Luke Perry, the film follows a circuit judge who tries to rescue a beautiful woman from a vengeful colonel. Goodnight for Justice: Queen of Hearts is the third and final film in a series, preceded by Goodnight for Justice (2011) and Goodnight for Justice: The Measure of a Man (2012).

== Plot ==
Circuit judge John Goodnight (Luke Perry) travels throughout the western territory in the 1880s presiding over legal cases in small towns. An honorable man, Goodnight is dedicated to dispensing justice, one town at a time, and protecting the innocent from injustice. Con artist Lucy Truffaut (Katharine Isabelle) earns her money as a card sharp and sells unsuspecting investors fake money-printing machines. One victim of her confidence game, Colonel Cyril Knox (Ricky Schroder), catches up with her and prepares to take his revenge. Just as he's about to take her away, she surrenders to a Pinkerton detective who arrests her after he confirms that she is wanted for larceny and fraud. The detective informs Knox he's taking her to Fort Collins to be remanded to federal authorities.

On the road to Fort Collins, Knox and his men attack the stage coach carrying Lucy and the Pinkerton detective. During the gunfight, the detective and driver are killed. As Knox and his men close in, Goodnight happens on the scene, shoots two of the four outlaws, and rescues Lucy, whom he mistakes for an innocent woman. With two outlaws still out there, Goodnight insists on accompanying her to the next town. After driving the stagecoach through the night, the judge and Lucy arrive at the next town where they report the attack. After she learns that the next stagecoach will only arrive in two days, Lucy proposes that he accompany her through Indian territory to Cody where she can catch a train east. Clearly attracted to her, the judge considers the proposal. Impressed by his gentlemanly behavior and the fact that he is a judge, Lucy shares his attraction.

That night, as Lucy prepares to escape, she sees Knox ride into town. Frightened, she goes to Goodnight's room and spends the night sleeping in his bed while he tries to sleep on the floor. During the night he goes downstairs and gets involved in a card game with Knox, unaware that he is the one who attacked the stagecoach. Goodnight wins all of the outlaw's money. The next morning, realizing that Lucy's pursuers are close by, the judge quietly leaves town with Lucy hidden in a blanket over his pack horse. They ride all day before camping for the night.

The next morning, Knox and his Indian tracker attack the campsite. After a gunfight, which leaves the tracker killed, the judge escapes with Lucy, with Knox close on their trail. When they come to the edge of a cliff, they jump into a river below and swim to a passing riverboat, which takes them toward Cody. On board, Lucy shares with the judge personal details about her difficult upbringing. The two grow closer, and that night Lucy comes to his room and they make love. Afterwards, she admits that she could settle down with him.

Their peaceful night is interrupted by Knox who has made his way onto the riverboat. After the judge arrests him, Knox escapes his captors, killing the captain. Meanwhile, Goodnight comes across one of Lucy's wanted posters and confronts her about it. His feelings for her are complicated by the revelation of her criminal past. After the captain's body is discovered, a gunfight breaks out between Knox and the judge. Lucy rushes in to help, and as Knox prepares to shoot her, the judge protects her by taking the bullet. After the judge falls overboard, Knox proceeds to choke Lucy. Goodnight, who managed to climb onto the paddle wheel, shoots Knox dead, saving Lucy's life.

Afterwards in the cabin, Lucy looks after the judge as he recovers from the fight. She tells him the Pinkerton badge in his pocket stopped Knox's bullet and saved his life. The next morning, Goodnight goes on deck looking for Lucy, fearing she's gone. She approaches and offers to turn herself in. He tells her he knows a judge who will go easy on her, and they embrace as the riverboat continues down the river.

== Cast ==
- Luke Perry as John Goodnight
- Katharine Isabelle as Lucy Truffaut
- Ricky Schroder as Colonel Cyril Knox
- Ryan Robbins as Pinkerton
- Patrick Sabongui as Man
- Kerry James as Butch Cassidy
- Adam Greydon Reid as Fat Cat
- Jerry Wasserman as Sheriff
- Serge Houde as Banker
- David Milchard as Deputy
- Donald Adams as Proprietor
- Billy Wickman as First Mate

== Production ==
Goodnight for Justice: Queen of Hearts was filmed in August 2011.

In an interview with Cowboys & Indians, Perry spoke about the evolution of the John Goodnight character, which he created:

He is turning out to be a little darker than I think everybody envisioned at the beginning. And I think that's because most of this guy's make-up, and most of his integrity, comes from that bad childhood experience, those bad things that happened to him in the first movie. He's still touched by that. Which is why I think he'll stay moving. They keep wanting to set him down in one place, and have him be the judge there. But that's not interesting to me. This is a guy who has to keep going to a different place time and again.

Goodnight for Justice: Queen of Hearts was filmed in Vancouver, British Columbia, Canada.

== Reception ==
In his review for the Daily News, David Hinckley gave the film three of five stars, writing, "Queen of Hearts isn't always subtle and some of it is lo-tech. It still makes you hope this isn't goodnight for good".
