= Kerry James (actor) =

Canadian actor and producer (born 1986)

- Born: Kerry James Horn; August 2, 1986 (age 38); Mission, British Columbia, Canada
- Occupation(s): Actor, filmmaker, producer
- Years active: 2007–present

Kerry James Horn (born August 2, 1986) is a Canadian actor and producer, known for Aliens in America (2007), and best known for his role as Caleb Odell on the CBC series Heartland.

== Biography ==
James was born in Mission, British Columbia.

== Filmography ==
Film and television
Year	Title	Role	Notes
2007	Aliens in America	Tim Chegley	TV series
2008	Donald Strachey	Joey Deems	TV series
2008–present	Heartland	Caleb Odell	TV series; recurring role
2009	Stargate Universe	Josh	Episode: "Earth"
2010	The Boy Who Cried Werewolf	Cort McCann	TV movie
2010	June	Young Man	Short
2011	Endgame	Ed	Episode: " The Other Side of Summer "
2011	The Sessions: Online	Patient #1	TV series
2011	Past Obsessions	Jake	TV movie
2011	The Movie Star	Thad	TV movie
2012	The Secret Circle	Aaron Wegner	Episode: Fire/Ice
2012	The Music Teacher	Zack	TV movie
2013	Goodnight for Justice: Queen of Hearts	Butch Cassidy	TV movie
2014	Pine Pinchers	Cameron Chadz	Short
2014	Cheat	Tom Brummell	Short
2015	Sinsters	Accountant	Short
2017	The Perfect Bride	Rennie	TV movie
2018	The Glove	Swan	TV movie
2023–present	The Way Home	Nick	Recurring role
