= Lloyd the Conqueror =

Lloyd The Conqueror
- Film poster
- Directed by: Michael Peterson
- Written by: Michael Peterson; Andrew Herman
- Starring: Evan Williams; Mike Smith; Brian Posehn; Harland Williams
- Production companies: Fresh Dog Productions; Matt Kelly Films
- Distributed by: Alliance
- Release dates: 24 September 2011 (Calgary International Film Festival); 30 November 2012 (Canada)
- Running time: 95 minutes
- Country: Canada
- Language: English

Lloyd the Conqueror is a 2011 Canadian comedy film co-written by Andrew Herman and Michael Peterson and also directed by Michael Peterson. Evan Williams stars as Lloyd, a college student who is convinced by his professor Derek, played by Mike Smith to join his deteriorating Larping league.

== Plot ==
Lloyd the Conqueror is Lloyd, a lazy college student with big dreams for the future. Lloyd and his two best friends Patrick and Oswald desperately need to pass their Medieval Literature class in order to keep their financial aid. Our heroes are so desperate that they beg their teacher for extra credit work. Their professor, Derek, concedes but only on one condition: They must join his deteriorating LARPing league and battle against him in a game of Demons & Dwarves. Lloyd decides to enlist the help of Cassandra, ex-cage fighter and "Self Defense for Women" instructor in the battle against Derek, the long reigning champion who has been twisted to the dark side by his years of intense academic study.

On their quest to victory the three students must match wits with a pack of crazed Danes whose bloodlust is posted on-line to their LARPing victories, the muscle bound Leopold who comes out of the Sanitarium to beat Lloyd and friends at the game he takes a little too seriously, and the stuck up Science Fiction Larper who would sooner break the prime directive than cut our heroes some slack. The journey forces Lloyd and the boys to do some actual work for once including throwing ‘magic’ tinfoil balls, deciding which household items are most effective in slaying trolls, and questioning society's hero worship of George Washington Carver.

== Cast ==
- Evan Williams as Lloyd
- Mike Smith as Derek
- Brian Posehn as Andy
- Jesse Reid as Patrick
- Scott Patey as Oswald
- Tegan Moss as Cassandra
- Harland Williams as Vulcan
- Aaron Pearl as Leopold
- David Lawrence as Jorgen
- Brendan Hunter as Klaus
- Andrew Sparacino as Dagmar
- Darcy Dunlop as Rosie
- Matt Kelly as Agent Danger
- Darcy Michael as Unicorn
- Gavin Williams as Oliver
