= The National Tree =

- DVD release poster
- Written by: J.B. White
- Directed by: Graeme Campbell
- Starring: Evan Williams; Andrew McCarthy; Kari Matchett; Paula Brancati
- Countries of origin: United States, Canada
- Original language: English

Production
- Producer: David Till
- Cinematography: François Dagenais
- Editor: Ralph Brunjes
- Running time: 88 minutes
- Production companies: QVF Productions; Cypress Point Productions

Original release
- Network: Hallmark Channel
- Release: November 28, 2009

The National Tree is a 2009 American-Canadian made-for-television drama film by Graeme Campbell. It features Andrew McCarthy and Evan Williams as father and son on a road-trip from Oregon to Washington, D.C. transporting their own Sitka Spruce tree on a truck to be planted across from the White House on Thanksgiving. The film was produced and aired by Hallmark Channel.

== Plot ==
Seventeen-year-old Rock Burdock wins a nationwide contest for his tree to be planted across the White House. Faith Russell, marketing representative of the company Box of Toys who is in charge of the project, visits Rock and his father Corey. Corey planted the tree in their garden when Rock was born. He has reservations about the idea of transporting his tree cross country, but agrees under the condition that they deliver the tree themselves. While father and son drive the truck, Faith follows them most of the time in her car. Father and son are unable to strengthen their bonding and further dissensions arise along the way. However, Rock films the entire trip on camera and posts it on his vlog. This gathers more and more fans on the internet and on the road and even causes some media coverage. Rock's internet acquaintance and love interest Katie joins Rock on the way. Together they reach Washington, D.C. on Thanksgiving. Meanwhile, Faith's boss secretly changed the plan. He wants to repeat the contest every year and therefore decides to erect the tree rather than planting it. After Faith's attempts to persuade her boss fail, the team now cuffs Rock to the tree and protest against its destruction. Using their media attention soon more people support their protest. Finally the President of the United States calls the park ranger on his cell phone and tells him to plant the tree. Later Rock, Corey, Faith and Katie are invited to attend the Christmas lighting of the tree by the President.

== Cast ==
- Andrew McCarthy as Corey Burdock
- Evan Williams as Rock Burdock
- Kari Matchett as Faith Russell
- Paula Brancati as Katie
- Jayne Eastwood as Lana
- Ted Atherton as Aaron
- Craig Eldridge as Jim
- Trent McMullen as Hank
- Vas Saranga as Ash
- Amanda Joy Lim as Ming
- Kristina Nicoll as Belinda
- Jean Daigle as Eddie
- B.J. McQueen as Trucker
- Bubba as DC Police Officer
- Joanne Reece as Secretary

== Production ==
The film was produced on locations in the United States and Canada.

== Reception ==
The Dove Foundation gave the film a negative rating.
