= Edward G. Robinson Jr. =

American actor (1933–1974)

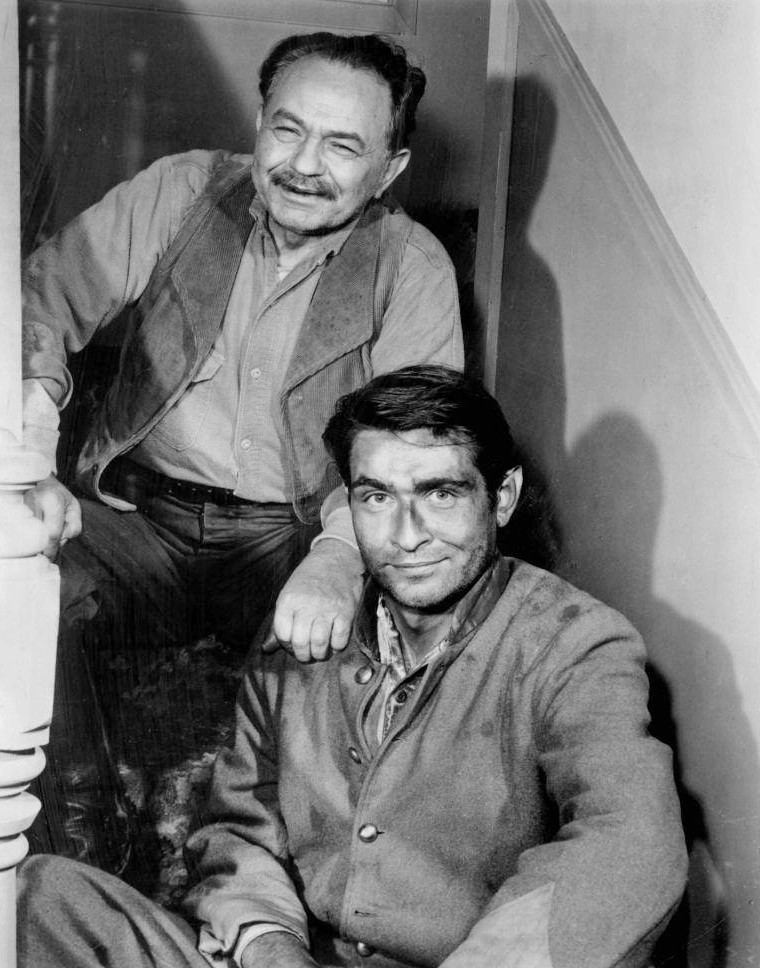
- Robinson Jr. with his father, Edward G. Robinson, in 1962
- Born: Edward Goldenberg Robinson Jr. ("Manny"); March 19, 1933; Los Angeles, California, U.S.
- Died: February 26, 1974 (aged 40); Los Angeles, California, U.S.
- Resting place: Hollywood Forever Cemetery
- Occupation: Actor
- Spouses: Frances Chisholm (m. 1952; div. 1955) Ruth Elaine Menold Conte (m. 1963; div. 1965) Nan Elizabeth Morris (m. 1970)
- Children: 2
- Father: Edward G. Robinson

Edward G. "Manny" Robinson Jr. (March 19, 1933 – February 26, 1974) was an American actor.

== Early life ==
Robinson was the sole child of actor Edward G. Robinson and his wife, actress Gladys Lloyd.

== Career ==
Edward G. Robinson Jr. appeared in 23 films and television series, beginning in 1952 with Invasion, U.S.A.. He appeared in the feature film Some Like It Hot (1959) as the murderer of George Raft's "Spats" Colombo character, hiding inside the birthday cake.

Robinson appeared in television series Wagon Train, Laramie, Gunsmoke, and Markham. His final role was in the 1971 television movie City Beneath the Sea.

In 1958, Robinson published his autobiography, My Father, My Son, written with William Dufty.

== Personal life ==
Robinson married three times. He married Frances Chisholm in 1952. They had a daughter, Francesca, but divorced in 1955. He married Ruth Elaine Menold Conte in 1963 and they divorced in 1965. He married Nan Elizabeth Morris in 1970 and their marriage lasted until his death.

Robinson was arrested for drunk driving in June 1956.

In a 1968 paternity suit by secretary Lucille Kass, Robinson was adjudicated to be the biological father of her daughter, Shawn, born June 7, 1966.

Robinson was found unconscious by his wife, Nan, in their West Hollywood home on February 26, 1974. He was pronounced dead of a heart attack at age 40.

== In popular culture ==
In the 2022 Netflix film Blonde, Robinson was portrayed by Evan Williams.

== Filmography ==
Year	Title	Role	Notes
1952	Invasion, U.S.A.	Radio Dispatcher	
1956	Screaming Eagles	Pvt. Smith	
1956	Bus Stop	Cowboy	Uncredited
1958	Tank Battalion	Corp. Corbett	
1959	Some Like It Hot	Johnny Paradise	
1960	Visit to a Small Planet	Melnick	Uncredited
