= Urban Legends (TV series) =

Canadian television series (2007–2011)

- Presented by: Michael Allcock (2007–2011); David Hewlett (2011)
- Country of origin: Canada
- No. of seasons: 4
- No. of episodes: 48

Production
- Executive producers: Simon Lloyd; Peter Jamieson; Sam Linton; Katherine Buck
- Producers: Glen Salzman; John Vandervelde; Tom Parkhouse
- Production locations: Ontario, Canada; Quebec, Canada
- Running time: 30 minutes

Original release
- Network: Biography Channel; History Television
- Release: June 23, 2007 – May 27, 2011

Urban Legends is a Canadian documentary-style television series hosted by Michael Allcock until David Hewlett became the new host in 2011. In each episode, three urban legends are dramatized and presented to the television audience; the audience is then asked to speculate which one or two of the three is true. Each legend has witnesses to tell the story. For the one or two fake legends, the witnesses are actors, while the true legend(s) uses real people affected by the story. Included in each episode are two quick quiz-like stories, called mini-myths, which air before the commercial breaks. Each begins with the number of the mini myth and its name, followed by the story. After the commercial, the answer to the mini-myth is announced and the rest of the programming continues as it previously had. The show originally aired on the Biography Channel in the US, History Television and Global in Canada and FX in the United Kingdom where it was hosted by Mark Dolan. It has also aired in Argentina, New Zealand, Sweden, Norway, Australia, Finland, Estonia, The Netherlands, Russia, Hungary and Denmark.

The series briefly returned to the Syfy network as an "Original Series" with new episodes starting on Monday April 18, 2011, then moved to the regular time, Fridays at 10. The new episodes followed exactly the same format as the original but were narrated by Stargate's David Hewlett. The show aired occasionally as reruns and mini-marathons on both SyFy and Chiller.
