= James Dougherty (police officer) =

American policeman, Marilyn Monroe's first husband (1921–2005)

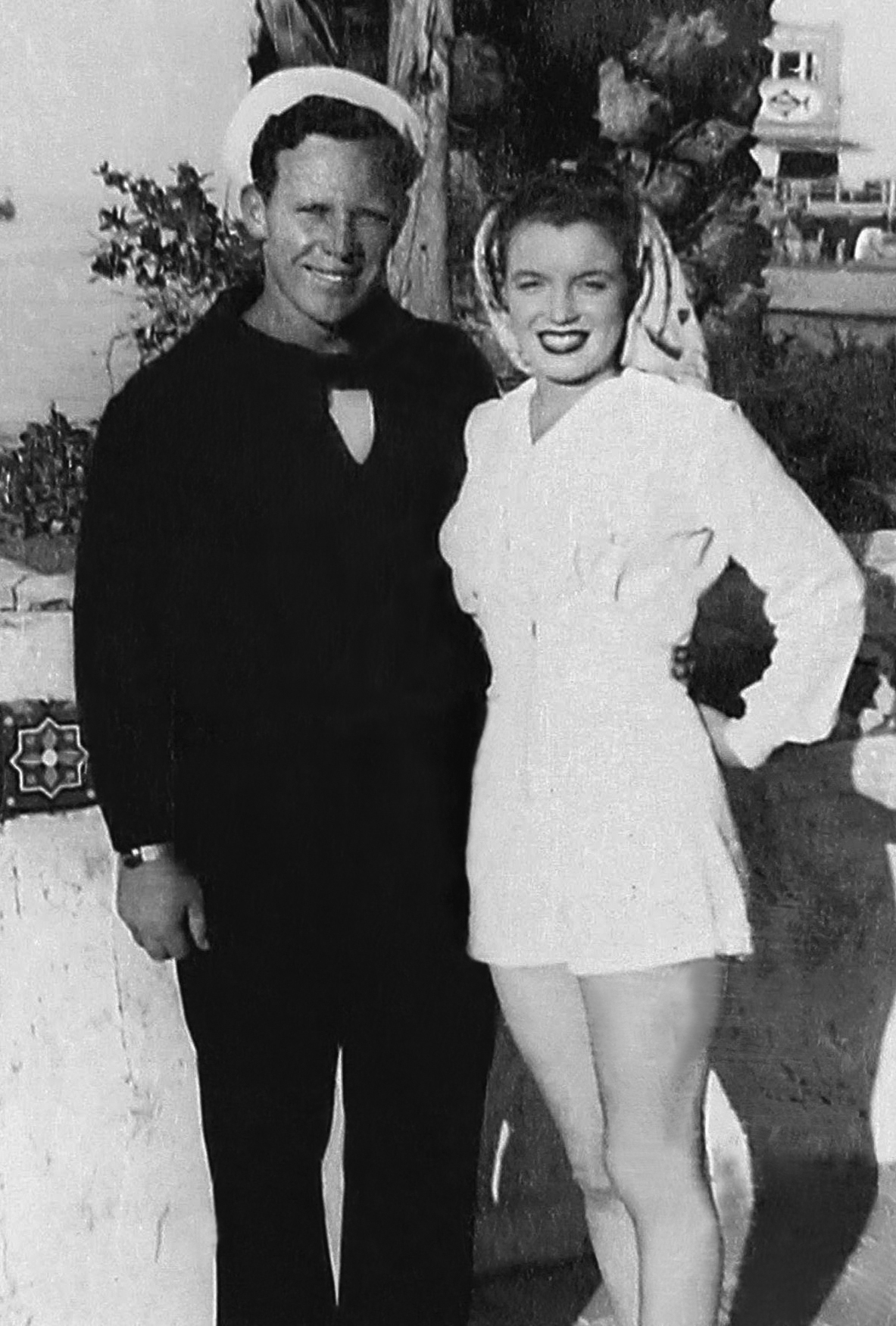
- Dougherty with then-wife Norma Jeane Mortenson (later known as Marilyn Monroe), c. 1943–44
- Born: James Edward Dougherty; April 12, 1921; Los Angeles, California, U.S.
- Died: August 15, 2005 (aged 84); San Rafael, California, U.S.
- Occupation: Officer in the Los Angeles Police Department
- Years active: 1949–1974
- Notable work: The Secret Happiness Of Marilyn Monroe (1976); To Norma Jeane With Love, Jimmie (1997)
- Spouses: Norma Jeane Mortenson (m. 1942; div. 1946); Patricia Scoman (m. 1947; div. 1972); Rita Lambert (m. 1974; died 2003)
- Children: 3

James Edward Dougherty (April 12, 1921 – August 15, 2005) was an American police officer, the first trainer of Special Weapons and Tactics. He is best known as the first husband of the actress Marilyn Monroe.

== Life and career ==
=== 1921–1941: Early life and education ===
James Edward "Jim" Dougherty was born on April 12, 1921, in Los Angeles, California. He was the fifth and last child of Edward and Ethel Dougherty (née Beatty), natives of Pueblo, Colorado. After moving to Globe, Arizona, the family suffered during the Great Depression, living in a tent. Dougherty attended Van Nuys High School in Los Angeles, California, where he became the popular, attractive football captain and class president. He graduated in 1938, in the same class as actress Jane Russell. He turned down an athletic scholarship from the University of California, Santa Barbara.

=== 1941–1946: Early career and first marriage ===
In 1941, Dougherty began working the night shift at Lockheed Aircraft. Around this time, Dougherty met 15-year-old Norma Jeane Mortenson (later known as Marilyn Monroe) at Van Nuys High School. Monroe was living with her foster parents, Dougherty's neighbors named Grace and Doc Goddard, as her mother, Gladys Pearl Baker, had been committed to a sanatorium for paranoid schizophrenia in 1934. Dougherty would often drive Monroe home from school. and despite Monroe's young age, she and Dougherty began dating around 1941, their first date being a Christmas dance.

In 1942, Doc Goddard got a job in West Virginia. However, state laws prevented them from taking Monroe with them, and Monroe faced the possibility of being sent to an orphanage. To prevent this, Grace approached Ethel with the proposition that Dougherty marry Monroe. Ethel agreed, and they approached Dougherty and Monroe with the idea. Both were reluctant due to Monroe's young age, but they began dating in January 1942. Despite the circumstances, the two of them got along well.

They were married in Los Angeles on June 19, 1942, just after Monroe's 16th birthday. Monroe's first foster parents Ida and Wayne Bolender were in attendance, as was her foster sister Nancy Jeffrey. After the wedding, they held a wedding reception at Florentine Gardens. Though numerous reports claim that both parties were skeptical about marriage, especially Monroe, Dougherty said, "[We] loved each other madly. I felt like the luckiest guy in the world." Monroe allegedly also told Grace that being married to Dougherty, whom she fondly called "Daddy" or "Jimmie", felt wonderful. Following the marriage, Monroe dropped out of high school and became a housewife. After honeymooning on a lake in Ventura County, California, they moved into a studio apartment in Sherman Oaks, Los Angeles.

In 1944, they moved to Santa Catalina Island, where Dougherty joined the Merchant Navy and taught sea safety. In April 1944, Dougherty was posted to the South Pacific. Monroe moved back to Van Nuys, where she resided with Dougherty's parents so she would not be alone. To help the war effort, she began working at the Radioplane Company that year, where she was noticed by photographer David Conover. In 1945, Monroe began modeling, much to the disappointment of Ethel, who disapproved of her having a career. She later signed a contract with the Blue Book Model agency and 20th Century Fox, who stipulated that she must be unmarried, as they did not want her to become pregnant. Due to this and his opposition to her career, Monroe filed for divorce from Dougherty in 1946. He received the divorce papers while on the Yangtze and was heartbroken. "It was like getting kicked by a mule," Dougherty said. "You don't know whether to throw up, jump over the side, commit suicide or what to do."

After Dougherty returned home, he tried to talk Monroe out of divorcing him, to no avail. Though Monroe offered to continue the relationship as an unmarried couple, Dougherty was not open to this, and the two scarcely interacted with each other save during legal and personal proceedings. Monroe later admitted, "My marriage [to Dougherty] didn't make me sad, but it didn't make me happy either. My husband and I hardly spoke to each other. This wasn't because we were angry. We had nothing to say. I was dying of boredom." The divorce was finalized on September 13, 1946. In 1976, Dougherty told People magazine that "If I hadn't gone into the Merchant Marines during World War II, she would still be Mrs. Dougherty today."

=== 1947–1973: Second marriage and career ===
Following the divorce, Dougherty followed Monroe's career as an actress. On one occasion, Monroe allegedly called Dougherty, saying she was bored of Hollywood, missed him and wanted to resume their relationship. Instead of accepting her back, he sold their story to a film magazine. This deeply agitated Monroe, who cut off most communications with him and rarely spoke about him in public.

In 1947, Dougherty married Patricia "Pat" Scoman, and they had three daughters. In 1949, he joined the Los Angeles Police Department and eventually became a detective. He played a part in the creation of the Special Weapons and Tactics group, becoming the first officer to train it. He also broke up a plot to kidnap American actor James Garner. He worked for the LAPD for 25 years. In 1950, Dougherty was stationed at the premiere of one of Monroe's early films, The Asphalt Jungle, to help with crowd control.

Dougherty learned of Monroe's death in 1962 through a coworker at LAPD. He was heartbroken and spent the day driving in a squad car to avoid the paparazzi. Unlike Monroe's second husband Joe DiMaggio, Dougherty never visited her grave, as "it was too painful." While speaking about Monroe's death in 2002, he said:

"It was like someone had kicked me in the stomach. I had almost been expecting it. Fame was injurious to her. She was too gentle to be an actress. She wasn't tough enough for Hollywood. And once someone starts getting into pills –uppers and downers, the way she was – people can go downhill. They can't sleep, so they take more and more pills."

— Dougherty, interview with Associated Press in 2002

By this time, Dougherty's marriage to Scoman had become strained, as she was jealous of Monroe and her success. When Scoman learned he had appeared on the CBS show To Tell The Truth and spoken about Monroe, she was furious and threw a pan at him. In futile attempts to please her, he burned all of Monroe's letters to him and refrained from watching her movies. In 1972, he and Scoman divorced, Scoman's jealousy of Monroe fueling the divorce.

=== 1974–2004: Retirement, third marriage and later years ===
Dougherty retired in 1974. That same year, he married his final wife, artist Rita Lambert, in California. Through the marriage, Dougherty had two stepchildren. Unlike Scoman, Lambert did not have any problems with Monroe; a huge fan of the star, she encouraged Dougherty to remember and embrace the years he had spent with Monroe. Together, they moved to Arizona and, in 1978, to her hometown in Sabattus, Maine, where he taught at the Criminal Justice Academy and worked as an Androscoggin County commissioner. He and Lambert were married until her death in 2003. He also worked for the Maine Boxing Commission.

In 1976, he released a memoir called The Secret Happiness of Marilyn Monroe. In 1990, he told the United Press International, "I never knew Marilyn Monroe, and I don't claim to have any insights to her to this day. I knew and loved Norma Jeane." He appeared in the 1991 documentary The Discovery Of Marilyn Monroe, along with actor Robert Mitchum and Russell, Monroe's costar in the 1953 film Gentlemen Prefer Blondes.

Dougherty and Russell also appeared on Sally in 1992, accompanied by Susan Strasberg. He released a second memoir, To Norma Jeane With Love, Jimmie in 2000. Both of his books were written upon receiving advice from Lambert. Marilyn's Man, a documentary about Dougherty, was filmed in 2004.

At the age of 84, Dougherty died on August 15, 2005, due to leukemia complications. His death made a standalone obituary in several outlets, including the Los Angeles Times, the Chicago Tribune, and The New York Times. He is buried in Maine.
