= La Crescenta-Montrose, California =

Unincorporated community in California, United States

- Unincorporated community Census designated place
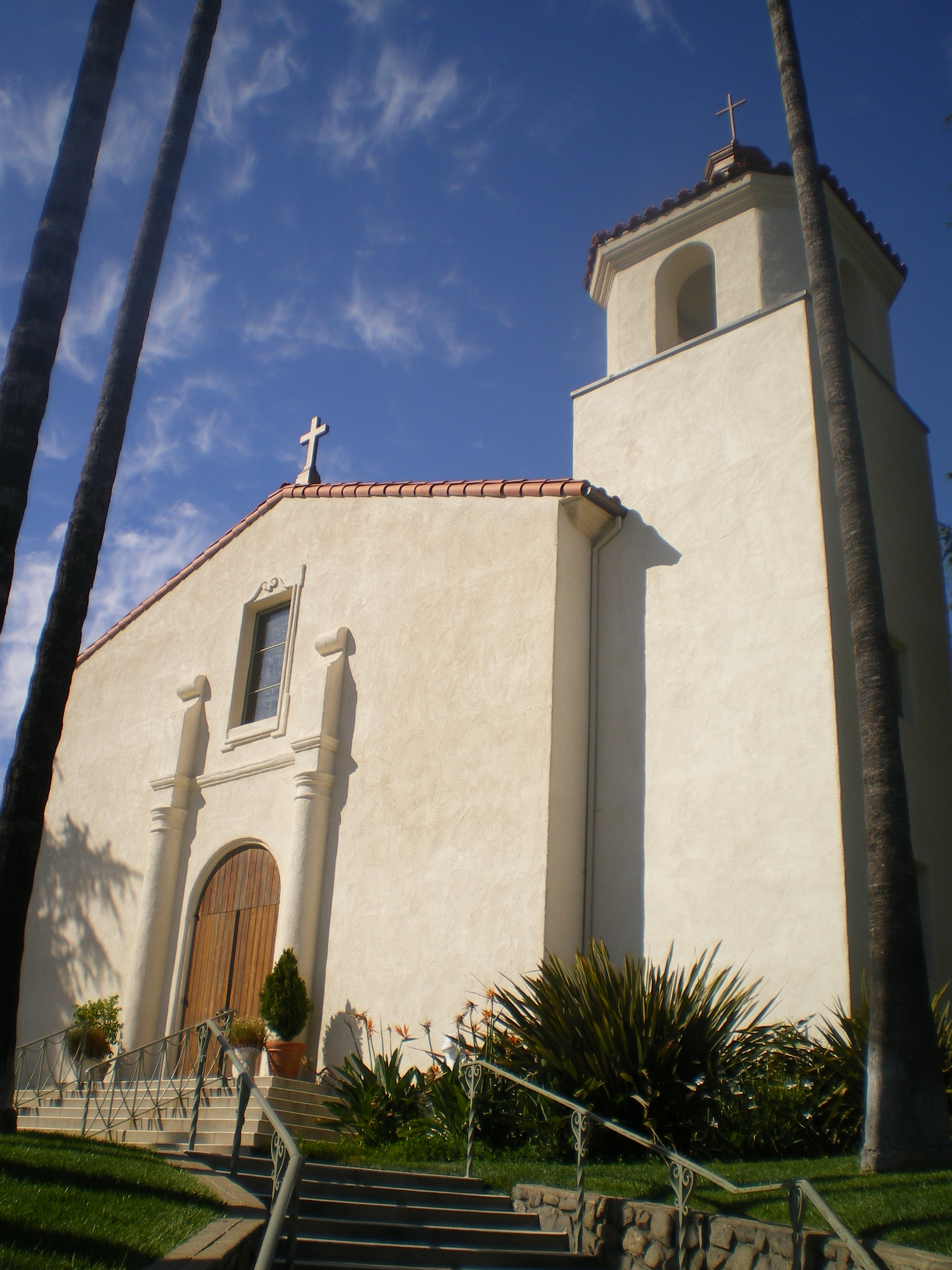
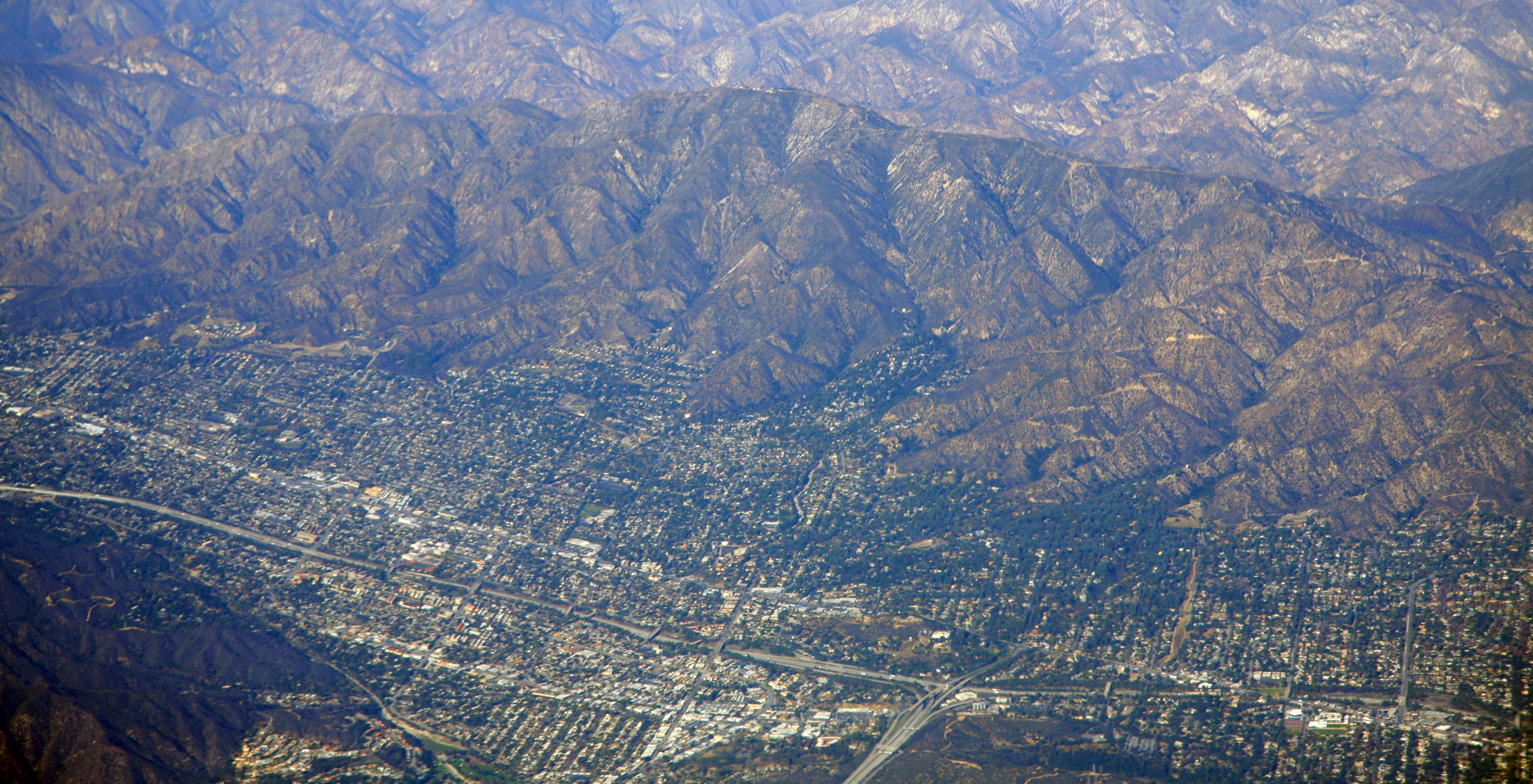
- Top: Holy Redeemer Catholic Church; Bottom: Mt. Lukens

- Location of La Crescenta-Montrose in Los Angeles County, California
- Coordinates: 34°13′30″N 118°14′13″W
- Country: United States
- State: California
- County: Los Angeles

Area
  - Total: 3.437 sq mi (8.902 km^{2})
  - Land: 3.426 sq mi (8.873 km^{2})
  - Water: 0.011 sq mi (0.029 km^{2}) 0.32%
- Elevation: 1,540.00 ft (469.392 m)

Population (2020)
  - Total: 19,997
  - Density: 5,837/sq mi (2,254/km^{2})
- Time zone: UTC−8 (PST)
  - Summer (DST): UTC−7 (PDT)
- ZIP Codes: 91214 (La Crescenta); 91020 (Montrose)
- Area codes: 747 and 818
- FIPS code: 06-39045

La Crescenta-Montrose is an unincorporated area in Los Angeles County, California, United States. The community is bordered by Glendale to the south and west, La Cañada Flintridge to the east, and Angeles National Forest to the north. According to the United States Census Bureau, the La Crescenta-Montrose Census-Designated Place (CDP) measures about 3.4 square miles (8.8 km^{2}), and the population was 19,997 at the 2020 census, up from 19,653 in 2010 and 18,532 in 2000.

== Geography ==
La Crescenta-Montrose encompasses those parts of the Crescenta Valley, northwestern San Rafael Hills, and northeastern Verdugo Mountains not within the cities of Glendale or La Cañada Flintridge. For statistical purposes, the United States Census Bureau has defined La Crescenta-Montrose as a CDP.

La Crescenta-Montrose is bordered on the north by the San Gabriel Mountains and Angeles National Forest, on the east by La Cañada Flintridge, on the south by the Verdugo Mountains and central Glendale, and the northwest by the Sunland-Tujunga community of Los Angeles. The Foothill Freeway (I-210) runs through the southern portion of the area.

=== Climate ===
Summers have highs of 90-100°F and lows of 60-70°F, and winters have highs of 60-70°F and lows of 35-45°F generally. Temperatures are cooler than those of Santa Clarita.

Climate data for La Crescenta, California
Month	Jan	Feb	Mar	Apr	May	Jun	Jul	Aug	Sep	Oct	Nov	Dec	Year
Record high °C (°F)	84 (29)	86 (30)	91 (33)	96 (36)	98 (37)	106 (41)	110 (43)	108 (42)	114 (46)	102 (39)	91 (33)	84 (29)	114 (46)
Mean maximum °C (°F)	74 (23)	75 (24)	81 (27)	87 (31)	89 (32)	95 (35)	98 (37)	99 (37)	98 (37)	92 (33)	81 (27)	73 (23)	101 (38)
Mean daily maximum °C (°F)	63 (17)	66 (19)	69 (21)	72 (22)	78 (26)	84 (29)	90 (32)	89 (32)	81 (27)	74 (23)	69 (21)	65 (18)	75 (24)
Mean daily minimum °C (°F)	45 (7)	45 (7)	48 (9)	50 (10)	54 (12)	58 (14)	63 (17)	64 (18)	62 (17)	56 (13)	49 (9)	44 (7)	53 (12)
Mean minimum °C (°F)	37 (3)	38 (3)	41 (5)	44 (7)	48 (9)	52 (11)	58 (14)	59 (15)	56 (13)	49 (9)	42 (6)	36 (2)	32 (0)
Record low °C (°F)	24 (−4)	25 (−4)	30 (−1)	37 (3)	43 (6)	47 (8)	52 (11)	53 (12)	43 (6)	41 (5)	32 (0)	22 (−6)	22 (−6)
Average rainfall mm (inches)	3.95 (100)	5.25 (133)	3.40 (86)	1.15 (29)	0.45 (11)	0.08 (2.0)	0.02 (0.51)	0.15 (3.8)	0.25 (6.4)	0.95 (24)	1.40 (36)	3.55 (90)	20.6 (521.71)
Average relative humidity (%)	55	59	58	55	56	56	53	54	55	52	50	52	55
Source: National Weather Service / COOP Data

== Demographics ==
=== Racial and ethnic composition ===
La Crescenta-Montrose CDP, California – Racial and ethnic composition Note: the US Census treats Hispanic/Latino as an ethnic category. This table excludes Latinos from the racial categories and assigns them to a separate category. Hispanics/Latinos may be of any race.
Race / Ethnicity (NH = Non-Hispanic)	Pop 2000	Pop 2010	Pop 2020	% 2000	% 2010	% 2020
White alone (NH)	12,417	11,376	10,461	67.00%	57.88%	52.31%
Black or African American alone (NH)	83	130	139	0.45%	0.66%	0.70%
Native American or Alaska Native alone (NH)	47	35	26	0.25%	0.18%	0.13%
Asian alone (NH)	3,441	5,339	5,632	18.57%	27.17%	28.16%
Native Hawaiian or Pacific Islander alone (NH)	5	9	12	0.03%	0.05%	0.06%
Other race alone (NH)	17	30	86	0.09%	0.15%	0.43%
Mixed race or Multiracial (NH)	685	502	933	3.70%	2.55%	4.67%
Hispanic or Latino (any race)	1,837	2,232	2,708	9.91%	11.36%	13.54%
Total	18,532	19,653	19,997	100.00%	100.00%	100.00%

=== U.S. Census ===
Historical population
Census	Pop.	Note	%±
1970	19,594		—
1980	16,531		−15.6%
1990	16,968		2.6%
2000	18,532		9.2%
2010	19,653		6.0%
2020	19,997		1.8%
U.S. Decennial Census; 1860–1870 1880-1890; 1900 1910 1920; 1930 1940 1950; 1960 1970 1980; 1990 2000 2010; 2020

La Crescenta-Montrose first appeared as an unincorporated community in the 1970 U.S. census; and as a census designated place in the 1980 United States census.

=== 2020 census ===
As of the 2020 census, La Crescenta-Montrose had a population of 19,997 and a population density of 5,833.4 inhabitants per square mile (2,252.3/km^{2}). The census reported that 99.9% of residents lived in households and 0.1% lived in non-institutionalized group quarters, with none institutionalized. 100.0% of residents lived in urban areas, while 0.0% lived in rural areas.

There were 7,200 households, of which 34.5% had children under the age of 18 living in them; 59.4% were married-couple households, 3.5% were cohabiting couple households, 24.0% had a female householder with no partner present, and 13.1% had a male householder with no partner present. About 20.7% of all households were made up of individuals and 10.0% had someone living alone who was 65 years of age or older. The average household size was 2.78. There were 5,384 families (74.8% of all households).

The age distribution was 21.7% under the age of 18, 7.5% aged 18 to 24, 23.5% aged 25 to 44, 30.5% aged 45 to 64, and 16.9% who were 65 years of age or older. The median age was 43.2 years. For every 100 females, there were 92.4 males, and for every 100 females age 18 and over there were 89.4 males.

There were 7,452 housing units at an average density of 2,173.9 per square mile (839.3/km^{2}), of which 3.4% were vacant. Of the 7,200 occupied units, 63.0% were owner-occupied and 37.0% were occupied by renters. The homeowner vacancy rate was 0.6% and the rental vacancy rate was 2.2%.

Racial composition as of the 2020 census
Race	Number	Percent
White	11,070	55.4%
Black or African American	155	0.8%
American Indian and Alaska Native	55	0.3%
Asian	5,677	28.4%
Native Hawaiian and Other Pacific Islander	13	0.1%
Some other race	846	4.2%
Two or more races	2,181	10.9%
Hispanic or Latino (of any race)	2,708	13.5%

=== 2010 census ===
The 2010 United States census reported that La Crescenta-Montrose had a population of 19,653. The population density was 5,717.8 inhabitants per square mile (2,207.7/km^{2}). The racial makeup of La Crescenta-Montrose was 12,807 (65.2%) White (57.9% Non-Hispanic White), 142 (0.7%) African American, 70 (0.4%) Native American, 5,375 (27.3%) Asian, 12 (0.1%) Pacific Islander, 533 (2.7%) from other races, and 714 (3.6%) from two or more races. Hispanic or Latino of any race were 2,232 persons (11.4%).

The Census reported that 19,652 people (100% of the population) lived in households, 1 (0%) lived in non-institutionalized group quarters, and 0 (0%) were institutionalized.

There were 7,088 households, out of which 2,700 (38.1%) had children under the age of 18 living in them, 4,190 (59.1%) were opposite-sex married couples living together, 784 (11.1%) had a female householder with no husband present, 298 (4.2%) had a male householder with no wife present. There were 212 (3.0%) unmarried opposite-sex partnerships, and 42 (0.6%) same-sex married couples or partnerships. 1,533 households (21.6%) were made up of individuals, and 555 (7.8%) had someone living alone who was 65 years of age or older. The average household size was 2.77. There were 5,272 families (74.4% of all households); the average family size was 3.26.

The population distribution was 4,612 people (23.5%) under the age of 18, 1,635 people (8.3%) aged 18 to 24, 4,590 people (23.4%) aged 25 to 44, 6,388 people (32.5%) aged 45 to 64, and 2,428 people (12.4%) who were 65 years of age or older. The median age was 41.6 years. For every 100 females, there were 92.9 males. For every 100 females age 18 and over, there were 89.8 males.

There were 7,350 housing units at an average density of 2,138.4 per square mile (825.6/km^{2}), of which 4,568 (64.4%) were owner-occupied, and 2,520 (35.6%) were occupied by renters. The homeowner vacancy rate was 0.6%; the rental vacancy rate was 4.1%. 13,478 people (68.6% of the population) lived in owner-occupied housing units and 6,174 people (31.4%) lived in rental housing units.

According to the 2010 United States census, La Crescenta-Montrose had a median household income of $89,375, with 7.4% of the population living below the federal poverty line.

=== 2023 American Community Survey ===
In 2023, the US Census Bureau estimated that the median household income was $119,775, and the per capita income was $57,075. About 4.4% of families and 5.8% of the population were below the poverty line.

=== Mapping L.A. ===
In 2009, the Los Angeles Times's Mapping L.A. project supplied these neighborhood statistics based on the 2000 census.

The percentages of Asian and white people in La Crescenta-Montrose were high for the county. Median income at $82,693 was high for the county, The percentages of households that earned $60,000 to $125,000 and $125,000 and up were high for the county. 40.8% of residents 25 and older had a four-year degree, high for the county. The percentages of residents ages 35 to 49 and 50 to 64 were among the county's highest. The single-parent rate was 8.8 percent, low for the county. The percentage of veterans who served during Vietnam was among the county's highest.

==== Comparison of La Crescenta-Montrose with nearby neighborhoods ====
Most percentages are rounded to the nearest whole figure.

	Tujunga, LA	La Crescenta- Montrose CDP	Glendale	La Cañada Flintridge	Pasadena
Population	26,527	18,507	195,047	20,381	134,941
White	61%	66%	54%	71%	39%
Latino	26%	10%	20%	5%	33%
Asian	7%	20%	16%	20%	10%
Black	2%	1%	1%	1%	14%
Household income	$58,001	$82,693	$57,112	$148,996	$62,825
College degree	22%	41%	32%	64%	42%
Median age	36	38	37	41	34
Single parents	14%	9%	9%	7%	13%
Veteran	10%	11%	6%	11%	8%
Foreign born	30%	28%	54%	19%	32%
Where?	Mexico, Iran	South Korea, Iran	Armenia, Mexico	South Korea, Iran	Mexico, Philippines
Ethnic diversity for L.A. County	Moderate	Average	High	Moderate	Average
Home ownership	55%	65%	38%	90%	46%

== Education ==
Public schools in La Crescenta-Montrose are a part of the Glendale Unified School District.

Elementary schools

- La Crescenta Elementary School
- Dunsmore Elementary School
- John C. Fremont Elementary School (Glendale)
- Abraham Lincoln Elementary School
- Monte Vista Elementary School
- Mountain Avenue Elementary School
- Valley View Elementary School

Middle schools

- Rosemont Middle School

High schools

- Crescenta Valley High School
- Anderson W. Clark Magnet High School

Independent study

- Verdugo Academy (K-12)
- Options For Youth Public Charter Schools (7-12)

Private

- Armenian Sisters' Academy (TK-8)
- Chamlian Armenian School (TK-8)
- Holy Redeemer-St. James Catholic School (TK-8) (Roman Catholic Archdiocese of Los Angeles)
- St. Monica Academy (1-12)
- Montrose Christian Montessori School (PK-6)

== History ==
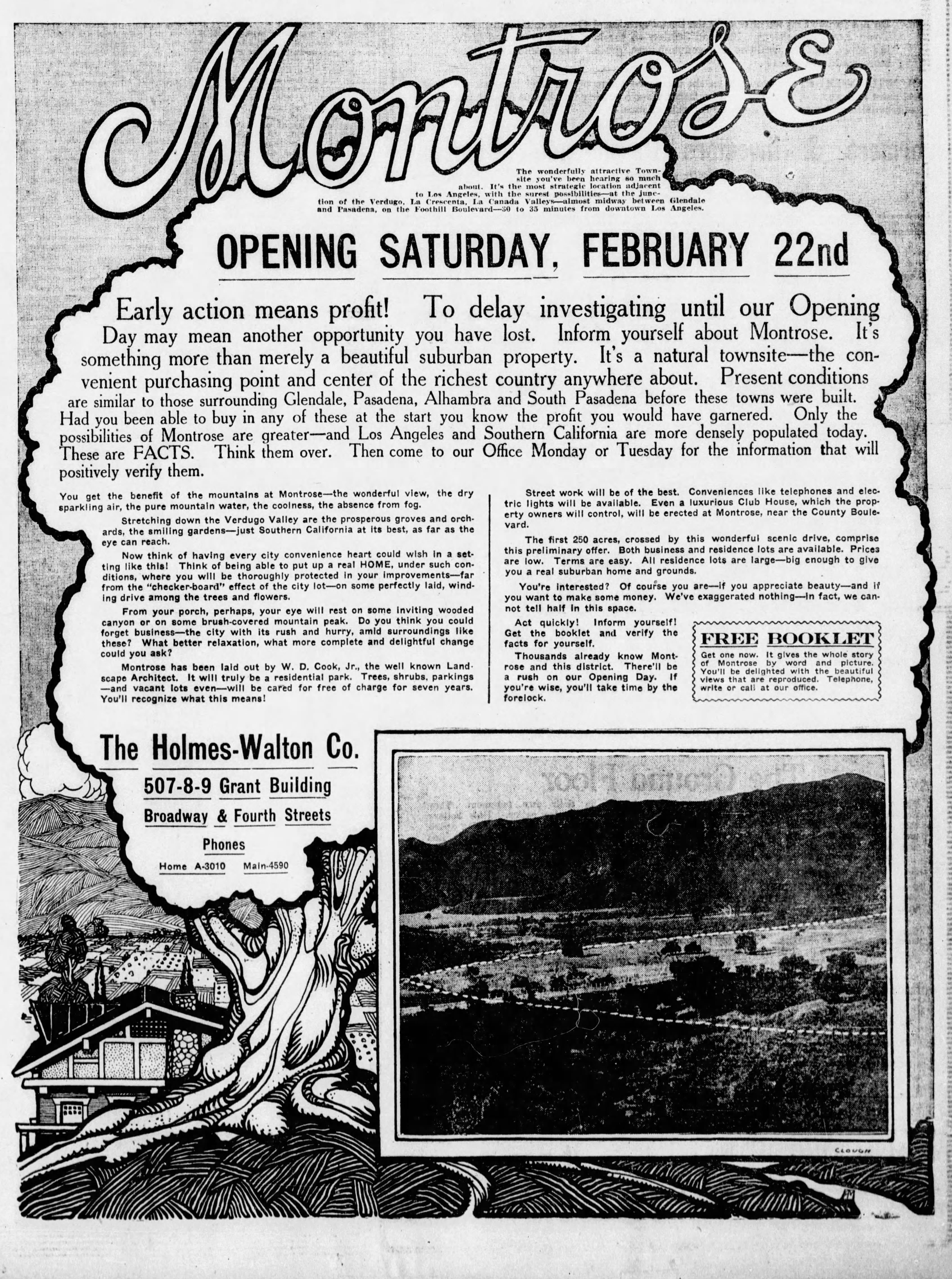
"Montrose" The Los Angeles Times, Feb. 9, 1913

The area is part of the homelands of the Tongva people. It became part of Rancho La Cañada, a Mexican land grant given in 1843 by Governor Manuel Micheltorena to a Mexican schoolteacher from Pueblo de Los Ángeles, Ygnacio Coronel (1795–1862).

La Crescenta does not mean "the crescent," which in Spanish would be el creciente. From his home, early settler Benjamin B. Briggs "could see three crescent-shaped formations, which suggested to him the artificial name," accepted by the U.S. Post Office in 1888. Montrose was chosen "as the result of a contest for the subdivision established in 1913 on part of the La Crescenta development.

=== The Great Flood of 1934 ===
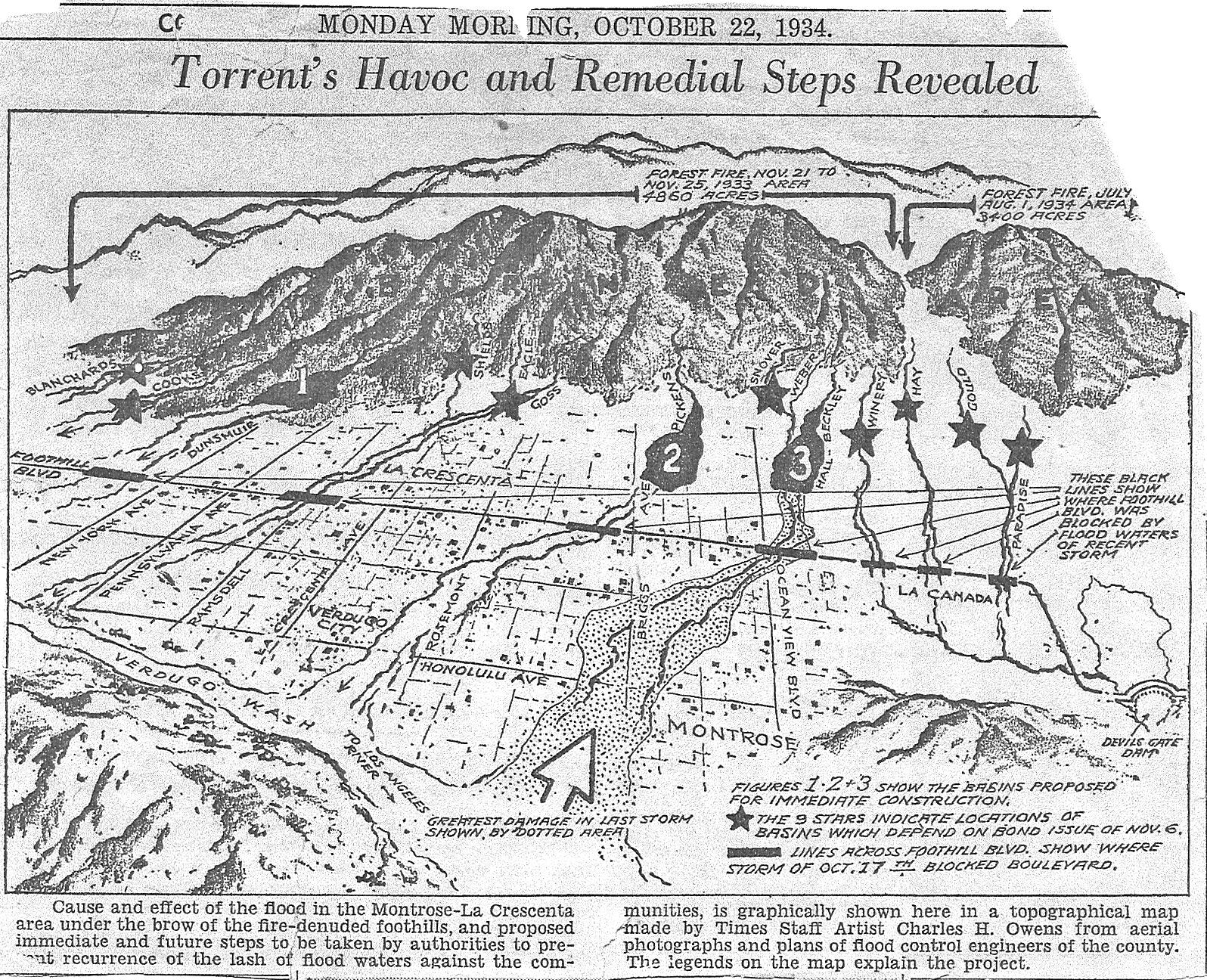
Los Angeles Times Illustration of the 1934 flood

In November 1933, wildfires raged through the nearby San Gabriel mountains above the communities of La Crescenta, La Cañada and Montrose. During the last week of December of that year, a series of winter storms pounded the mountainside with 12 inches (300 mm) of rain. On New Year's Eve, more heavy rains led to sporadic flooding.

Around midnight, hillsides in at least three mountain locations collapsed sending millions of tons of mud and debris into the Crescenta Valley neighborhoods below.

More than 400 homes were destroyed in La Cañada, La Crescenta, Montrose and Tujunga. Scores of people were killed, and hundreds were left homeless. Entire families were wiped out. The mudslides that began in the mountains above La Cañada and La Crescenta carved a path of destruction all the way to the Verdugo Wash and beyond.

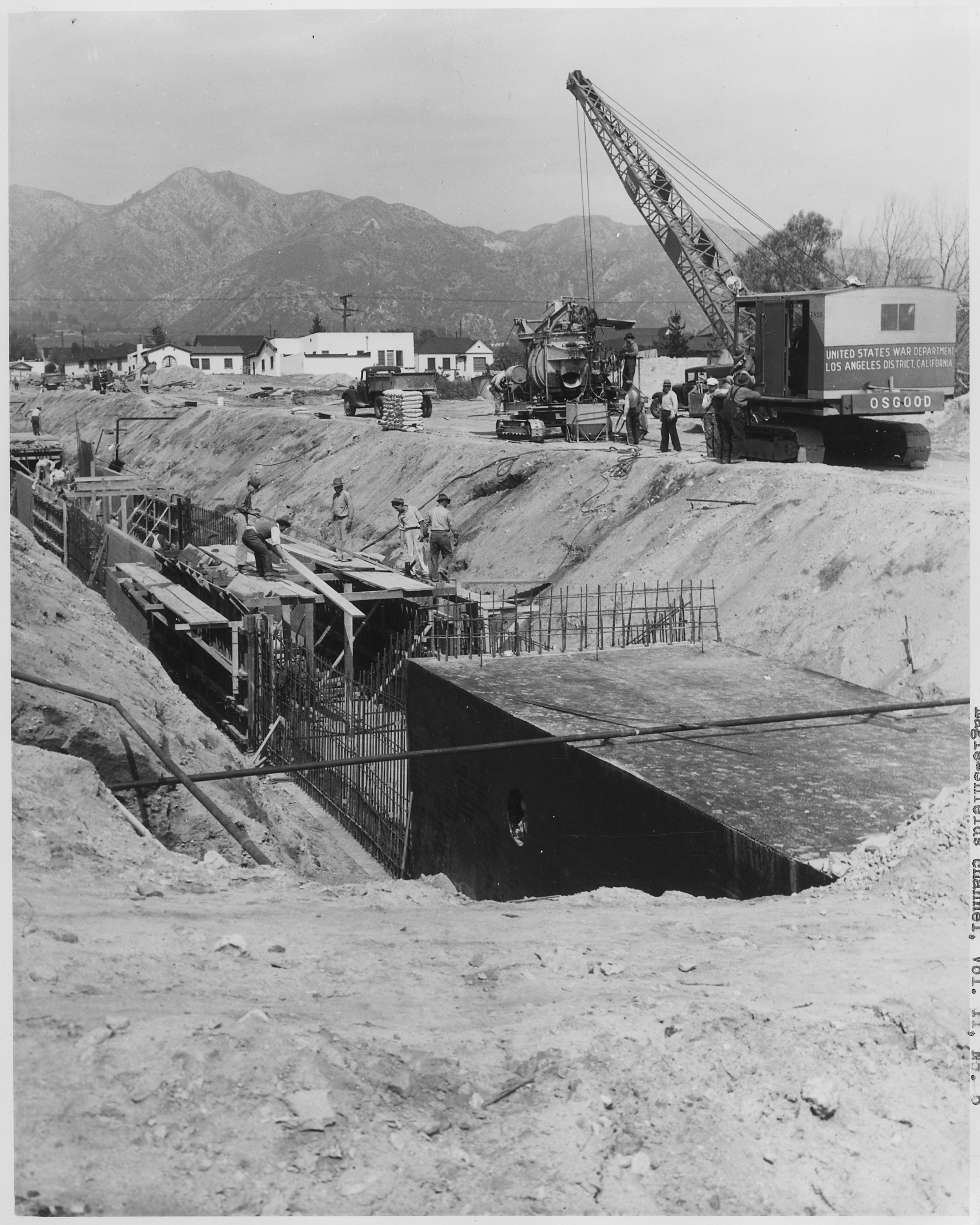
Storm drain under construction

Some Montrose residents sought shelter from flooding at American Legion Post 288, which was destroyed, killing 12.

Parts of Foothill Boulevard were buried under 12 feet (4 m) of mud, boulders and debris. The mud was deep enough to bury cars completely on Montrose Avenue. Miles of Honolulu Boulevard were inundated by several feet of sand and silt.

Two notable victims of the flood were silent-era identical-twin child actors Winston and Weston Doty, who died at the age of 19.

Following the disaster, the U.S. Army Corps of Engineers and the County of Los Angeles built a flood control system of catch basins and concrete storm drains, designed to prevent a repeat of the 1934 disaster.

The flood was commemorated in Woody Guthrie's song "Los Angeles New Year's Flood". To honor the victims of that New Year's calamity and to mark its 75th anniversary, a small monument was dedicated January 1, 2004, at Rosemont and Fairway avenues in Montrose, near where the American Legion Hall had stood.

== In popular culture ==
In the spring of 2012, a black bear wandered regularly from the Angeles National Forest into the La Crescenta-Montrose-Glendale residential area, rummaging through trash cans and showing a preference for Costco meatballs and tuna. The bear was subdued in La Crescenta and returned to the forest. A Twitter account from an individual posting as "GlenBearian" appeared with updates from the bear's perspective.

The historic 1946 La Crescenta Motel, formerly known as the May Lane Motel, with its classic postwar L-shaped layout on Foothill Boulevard, has been used as a location for numerous feature films and television shows, such as Glee, Criminal Minds, Mad Men and True Blood.

As of September 2025, the La Crescenta Motel land has been purchased by developers proposing the construction of a new apartment complex with designated units available for low income residents.

Rockhaven Sanitarium on Honolulu Avenue, built entirely of rock, opened in 1923. It became known as the "Screen Actors' Sanitarium," housing such patients as Billie Burke and Gladys Baker, mother of Marilyn Monroe. Closed in 2006, the property was purchased by the City of Glendale in 2008. As of early 2016, the site is being considered for "adaptive reuse."

Today, the local non-profit, Friends of Rockhaven, advocates for the preservation of the landmark. Highlighting its historical importance as a safe space to treat women suffering from mental illness, it was founded and run by Agnes Richards from 1923-1967.

Another, more notorious sanitarium existed in La Crescenta from the 1920s to the early 1960s. A few yards west of the La Crescenta Motel, on the corner of Foothill Boulevard and Rosemont Avenue, is the site of the Kimball Sanitarium, which was housed in a large, foreboding, converted Victorian mansion built in the 1880s. Bela Lugosi attempted to overcome his morphine addiction at the Kimball, represented in the Tim Burton film Ed Wood. Actress Frances Farmer, misdiagnosed as a "paranoid schizophrenic," received insulin shock therapy at Kimball. Plans to expand the sanitarium were rejected by local residents in the early 1960s, and the sanitarium was torn down. Construction workers readying the building for demolition found padded cells with straitjackets and manacles attached to the walls. The site became a shopping plaza in 1989, and a Ralphs supermarket occupies the spot where the disreputable sanitarium once stood.

During a bipolar episode in 1996, actress Margot Kidder attempted to walk 12 miles (19 km) from downtown Los Angeles to the La Crescenta home of a friend, writer Rosie Shuster. Kidder was discovered in Glendale and hospitalized.

== Government and infrastructure ==
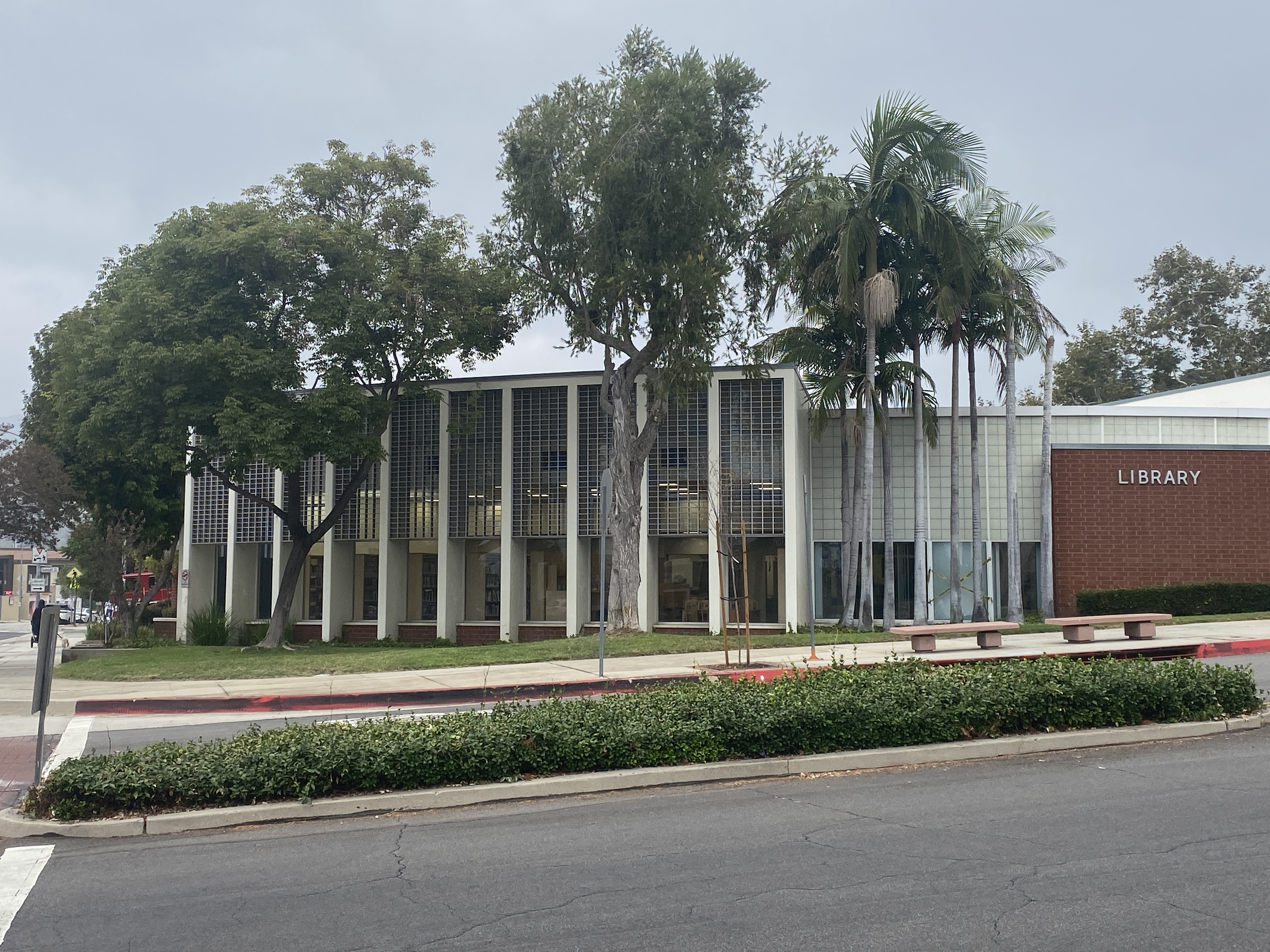
City of Glendale Montrose-Crescenta Branch Library

In the state legislature, La Crescenta-Montrose is situated in the 25th senate district, represented by Senator Anthony Portantino, and the 44th assembly district, represented by Assemblywoman Laura Friedman. The area is in California's 28th congressional district, represented by Congresswoman Judy Chu.

The Los Angeles County Sheriff's Department (LASD) operates the Crescenta Valley Station in La Crescenta, serving La Crescenta and Montrose.

=== Crescenta Valley Town Council ===
The Crescenta Valley Town Council (CVTC) is composed of nine democratically elected councilmembers, each of whom serve three-year terms upon installation. CVTC is currently the Los Angeles County unincorporated area's main advisory body to the county supervisor's office and other governing agencies, as well as an organized institution that is often counted on to facilitate community-wide forums to inform or garner opinion from residents.

The Crescenta Valley Town Council meets at the La Crescenta Library.

=== Health ===
The Los Angeles County Department of Health Services operates the Glendale Health Center in Glendale, serving La Crescenta and Montrose.

USC Verdugo Hills Hospital is a 158-bed nonprofit primary-care facility. It features emergency services, inpatient and outpatient diagnostic and treatment facilities, a family birthing center, and bariatric and orthopedic surgical services.

== Media ==
La Crescenta and the Crescenta Valley area is served by the Crescenta Valley Weekly and the Glendale News Press.

== Transportation ==
The Amtrak Thruway 19 provides twice daily connections to/from Lowell and Honolulu Avenues to/from Bakersfield to the north, and San Bernardino to the east, with several stops in between.

The closest Amtrak station is in Glendale.

The Metro 90 bus connects La Crescenta to North Hollywood station and downtown Los Angeles.

People also looking to travel via Glendale beeline can transfer to or from Ocean View & Montrose on the line 3 of Glendale Beeline (Monday-Friday) or line 31 towards Downtown Glendale or to La Crescenta (Saturdays only) are able to do so.

== Points of historical interest ==
St. Luke's of the Mountains Episcopal Church was designed and built by the famous artist Seymour Thomas in 1924. Constructed of natural stone from the valley, it is reminiscent of a woodlands church in northern Europe. It is considered to be the architectural centerpiece of the valley. St. Luke's is located at 2563 Foothill Boulevard.

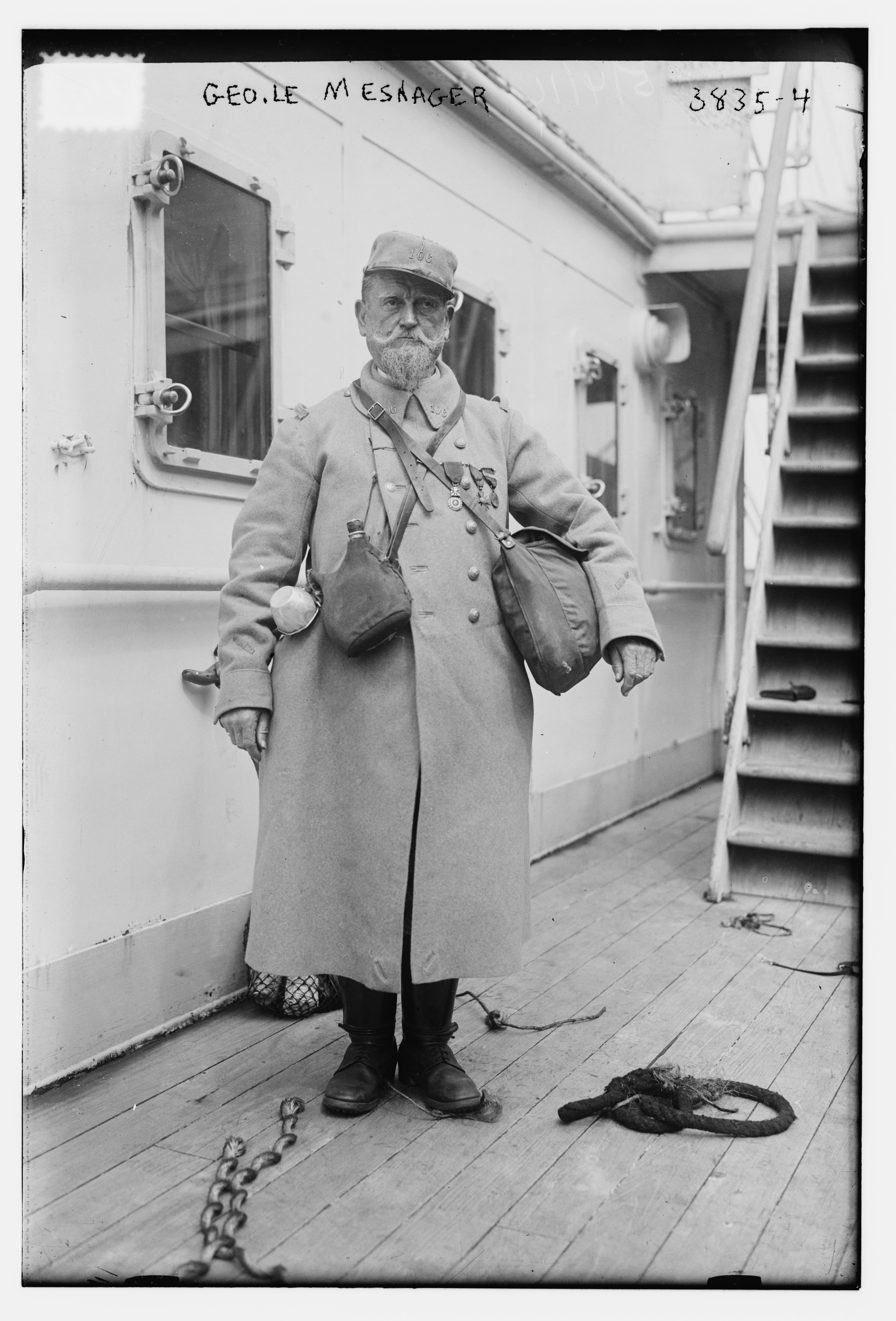
George Le Mesnager c. 1915

Le Mesnager Barn is a stone barn perched high above the valley, built in 1911 by George Le Mesnager, a French patriot, to store and process grapes from his vineyards in the Sparr Heights area. These grapes supplied his Old Hermitage Vineyards in downtown Los Angeles. There is still a Mesnager Street in the downtown area where the winery had been located. The barn, now owned by the City of Glendale, is an educational nature/history center. Le Mesnager Barn is located in Deukmejian Wilderness Park at the top of Dunsmore Ave.

La Crescenta is home to one of two American ashrams founded by Indian teacher and mystic poet Swami Paramananda who came to America in 1906. Founded in 1923, the Ananda Ashram is located at the top of Pennsylvania Avenue near Deukmejian Wilderness Park.

The La Crescenta Woman's Club began in 1911, incorporated in 1923, and built its clubhouse in 1925. The structure, the social center of the valley for most of the last century, is the home for the organization's many charitable and social events. The La Crescenta Woman's Club is located at 4004 La Crescenta Avenue.

Sparr Heights Community Center was built early in 1922 by William S. Sparr as the real estate office for the Sparr Heights residential tract, originally named Oakmont Park. It was donated to the City of Glendale on December 24, 1922, and has been a community meeting place and senior center since then. Sparr Heights Community Center is located at 1613 Glencoe Way, across the street from John C. Fremont Elementary School.

La Crescenta Elementary School was built in 1887 at the corner of Foothill and Dyer, but soon moved to a new location at La Crescenta and Prospect. A wooden schoolhouse was built on this site in 1890. A larger school building replaced it in 1914, and the present structure was erected in 1948.

The Old School Bell: La Crescenta's school bell first rang students to school from across the valley in 1890. It was placed in storage from 1948 until 1976 when it was re-hung and dedicated with a plaque listing the names of the children in the first class at La Crescenta Elementary. The bell, located in front of La Crescenta Elementary School, is rung once a year in June by the graduating students.

La Crescenta Presbyterian Church is a striking church building constructed in 1923. This is one of the older congregations in the valley, first meeting in the 1880s. In the congregation's early years, it shared facilities with the elementary school as did the Episcopalians who later built St. Luke's. La Crescenta Presbyterian Church is located at 2902 Montrose Avenue.

Crescenta Valley Community Regional Park is a diverse recreational area serving residents of La Crescenta. From 1934-1957, part of the land was privately owned by the German-American League and was named Hindenburg Park after former German President Paul Von Hindenburg. The park hosted German cultural events in addition to several pro-Nazi rallies. In 2016, a “Welcome to Hindenburg Park” sign was erected at Crescenta Valley Community Regional Park, sparking controversy within the community. After significant debate and encouragement from The Jewish Federation of the Greater San Gabriel and Pomona Valleys, the sign was taken down.

Pickens Canyon Park, situated at the intersection of Briggs Boulevard and Foothill Boulevard, is a small community space. The park is a remembrance of the early days of settlers in La Crescenta. Within the park are plaques remembering Colonel Theodore Pickens. He settled in what is now La Crescenta in 1871, where he claimed ownership of the forests and water sources, exploiting the resources for profit. Pickens Canyon Park also honors Dr. Benjamin Briggs, who settled in 1881 and was responsible for establishing the community's first streets, schools, and churches, as well as giving the valley its name, La Crescenta.

== See also ==
- M.V. Hartranft, an early developer of Montrose
