= Gladys Pearl Baker =

American mother of Marilyn Monroe (1902–1984)

Gladys Pearl Monroe
- Gladys Pearl Monroe holding Norma Jeane
- Born: Gladys Pearl Monroe; May 27, 1902; Piedras Negras, Coahuila, Mexico
- Died: March 11, 1984 (aged 81); Gainesville, Florida, U.S.
- Other name: Gladys Pearl Monroe Mortensen Eley
- Citizenship: Mexico • United States
- Spouses: Jasper Newton Baker (m. 1917; div. 1921); Martin Edward Mortensen (m. 1924; div. 1928); John Stewart Eley (m. 1949; died 1952)
- Children: 3, including Marilyn Monroe and Berniece Baker Miracle

Gladys Pearl Monroe (May 27, 1902 – March 11, 1984), also known as Gladys Pearl Monroe Baker Mortensen Eley, was the mother of American actress Marilyn Monroe. Born in Mexico, Baker grew up in the Los Angeles metro area. Her father died in 1909 after suffering from mental illness and alcoholism.

Gladys was married three times and divorced twice. She was married for the first time at age 14 to Jasper Newton Baker. (Note: Banner states that Gladys was 15 when she was married to Baker, but she was married 10 days before her 15th birthday.) They had two children, American author Berniece Baker Miracle and Robert Jasper "Kermit" Baker. At the end of the marriage, Jasper kidnapped their two children and returned to his native Kentucky without his wife's knowledge. Gladys moved to Kentucky to be near her children but left after four months. She had limited contact thereafter. She moved to Hollywood, where she became a film cutter in the growing movie industry. There, she met Martin Edward Mortensen, with whom she had a short marriage that ended in divorce. Afterwards, she had a relationship with Charles Stanley Gifford while he was separated from his wife. Gladys became pregnant with her third child, Norma Jeane Mortenson (also called Norma Jeane Baker and later Marilyn Monroe). Gladys struggled to take care of her daughter and placed her with a foster family weeks after her birth.

In 1934, Gladys had a mental breakdown and was diagnosed with paranoid schizophrenia. From 1934 until the 1960s, Gladys was subsequently confined in psychiatric facilities.

In her later years, she lived with her daughter Berniece before moving to a senior care facility.

== Life ==
=== Early life ===
Gladys Pearl Monroe was born on May 27, 1902, (Note: Taraborrelli says that Baker was born on May 27, 1900, but the census record for 1910 shows that Gladys P. Monroe was born in Mexico in 1902.) in Porfirio Díaz (now named Piedras Negras, Coahuila) in Mexico, across the border from Eagle Pass, Texas. Her mother, Della Mae Monroe (née Hogan), was born in Missouri and she was from Bentonville, Arkansas, and her father, Otis Elmer Monroe, was a house painter from Indianapolis. He also sold portraits and landscapes that he had painted and dreamed of living in Paris. Her family had Scottish and Irish ancestry. At the time of Baker's birth, Otis worked for the National Railroad of Mexico painting railway cars. Della was a midwife and an unofficial teacher. In the spring of 1903, the family moved to Los Angeles County, where Otis worked for the Pacific Electric Railway Company.

Gladys and her brother, Marion Otis Elmer, had an unstable upbringing due to their father's alcoholism, frequent moves, and their parents' troubled marriage. Otis Sr. was prone to fits of rage and crying, migraines, dementia, and seizures. Her father was institutionalized at Patton State Hospital in San Bernardino County in November 1908. He had an advanced, untreatable case of neurosyphilis and was semi-paralyzed due to paresis. He was mentally ill at the time of his death on July 22, 1909. (Note: When the Monroes lived in Mexico, syphilis was an epidemic. One physician believed that Otis did not contract syphilis through sex, but through unsanitary work conditions in which the bacteria was spread by mosquitos.) Della supported the children as a domestic worker and by renting out rooms in her house. (Note: In 1910, one couple with a child and another couple were boarders.)

She married a second time to Lyle Arthur Graves, a railway switchman supervisor at Pacific Electric, on March 7, 1912. They lived in Los Angeles at Graves' house. Della divorced him on January 17, 1914, charging Graves with "failure to provide, dissipation and habitual intemperance." Della lived in Oregon by September 1914, and she married a man named Chitwood, or Charles E. Young on July 26, 1916, in Portland, Oregon. Gladys got along with this stepfather and had fond memories of living on a farm in Oregon. Della divorced again, this time citing alcoholism. (Note: At the time, the only legal grounds for divorce were adultery, alcoholism, and physical abuse. So, the reason for the divorce was documented as alcoholism, but there may have been another reason for the failure of the relationship.)

By 1916, Gladys lived in Venice, Los Angeles, with her mother and brother. Gladys was a social teen at school who, like her mother, preferred older men. Marion went to live in San Diego with cousins in a household that was headed by a father. In 1917, Della began a tumultuous relationship with Charles Grainger, a widower with two sons. Della and Gladys lived off and on at his nearby two-room bungalow. The couple was never married, but Della went by Mrs. Grainger. Gladys was very unhappy living with Grainger, as she had been with Graves.

=== 1916–1923: Marriage to Jasper Baker ===
At the age of 14, Gladys met John Newton ("Jasper" or "Jap") Baker, a businessman from Kentucky and a "violent drinker" who beat Gladys during their marriage. He owned the apartment building that Della managed. They were married on May 17, 1917, with her mother's permission and a signed affidavit that Gladys was 18. Gladys gave birth to a son, Robert Kermit "Jackie", followed by a daughter, Berniece Inez Gladys. As a child, Jackie fell out of the family car, suffering injuries that left him disabled for the rest of his life. After abusive incidents, Gladys filed for divorce from Jasper in 1921, and was awarded custody of the children. Jasper kidnapped the children and returned with them to his native Kentucky, where his mother helped raise them.

About one year later, when she was age 20, Gladys moved to Kentucky to live near her children. She worked cleaning houses and caring for children. According to biographer Donald Spoto, Gladys visited the children once in Kentucky and then had "infrequent attempts to contact" Jackie and Berniece during their childhood. She had not developed the emotional stability to properly care for the children. Four months later, she returned to California. Jasper had married a woman who was good to her children, and Gladys was afraid of Jasper who had bloodied her back while she was in Kentucky. No one would help her get her children back.

After Gladys lost her children, she became a heavy drinker, according to Della. Jackie reportedly died in his 20s, never seeing his mother again. Berniece did not see her mother for many years.

=== 1923–1928: Hollywood and second marriage ===
In 1923, Gladys moved to Hollywood and worked for Consolidated Film Industries as a negative film cutter. She worked six days a week cutting out portions of the film that studio editors marked for removal. Another group of people assembled the strips to create the final release negative. Baker also worked as a film cutter at Columbia Pictures and RKO.

She met Grace McKee, a supervisor at Consolidates, and they became good friends. In the summer of 1923, they moved into an apartment in an area that came to be known as Silver Lake in Los Angeles and east of Hollywood. The two women embraced the freedom of the Roaring Twenties, becoming flappers "who chose to extend the recent women's suffrage amendment to include the various social and sexual autonomies long claimed by men." Grace transformed Gladys from a brown-haired "plain jane" to an attractive red-headed woman who wore stylish clothing. In 1925, McKee married actor Ervin Silliman "Doc" Goddard.

During the time that Gladys worked at RKO, she was described as having a flat affect and seemed closed off. She was also described by coworkers, though, as beautiful, having twinkling green eyes and a lively spirit, delightful, and funny.

In the summer of 1924, Gladys met Martin Edward Mortensen, the son of a Norwegian immigrant and a 27-year-old meterman for the Southern California Gas Company. They both had been married once before. They married on October 11, 1924. Gladys was initially attracted, among other things, to Mortensen's stability, but after they were married she became bored with him. She left him around early 1925 and moved in with Grace. Mortensen filed a divorce petition on May 26, 1925, citing desertion. He tried to win his wife back, but they were divorced on August 15, 1928.

=== 1925–1926: Relationship with Charles Stanley Gifford and birth of Norma Jeane ===
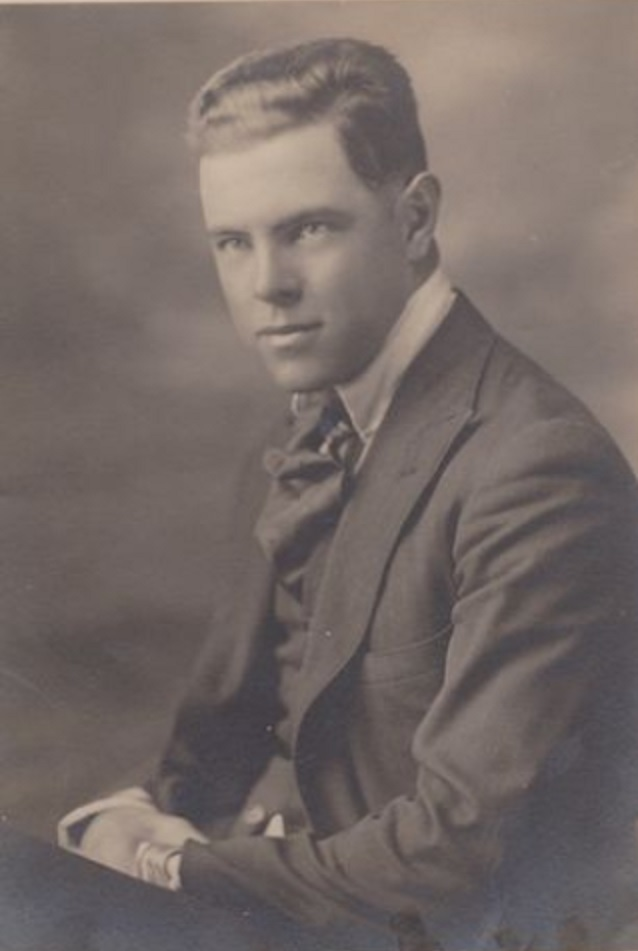
Charles Stanley Gifford, c. 1922

Gladys worked as a negative film cutter under Charles Stanley Gifford, her superior at RKO Pictures. Gifford had separated from his wife, Lillian Priester, in October 1923. They were divorced in May 1925. That same year, Gladys and Gifford, a self-proclaimed womanizer, began an affair. Beside Gifford, Gladys had relationships with other men in 1925.

In late 1925, 10 months after Gladys left Mortensen, she found out that she was pregnant. In the winter of 1925, Gifford took Gladys to meet his family. They did not approve of him marrying a pregnant woman who was not raising her existing children.

Gladys gave birth to her third and final child, Norma Jeane (later known as Marilyn Monroe), on June 1, 1926, in the Los Angeles County Hospital. (Note: According to Spoto, Norma Talmadge was the inspiration for the girl's first name.) Gifford later remarried and kept his illegitimate daughter a secret from his wife. Because Gladys was still married to Mortensen, he was legally Norma Jeane's father. When the child was older, Gladys reportedly told her that her father, whom she refused to name, was a movie star. In 2022, DNA testing confirmed Gifford was the father.

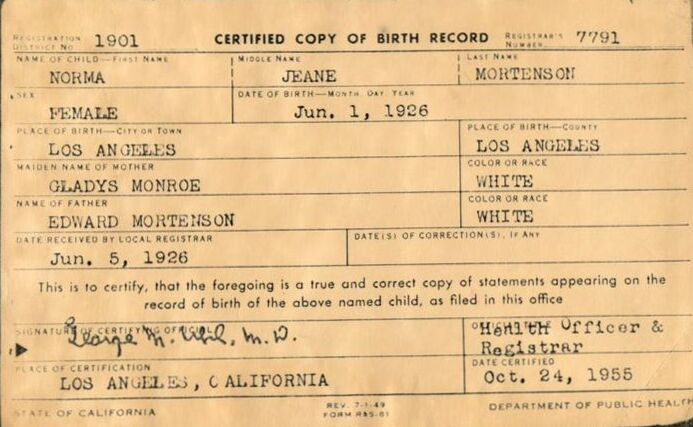
Marilyn Monroe's birth certificate

Baker registered the surname Mortenson on Norma Jeane's birth certificate, using the name of her estranged husband and specifying his address as unknown. She also stated that she had previously had two children, but incorrectly stated that they were no longer living. Norma Jeane was baptized with the name Baker when her grandmother Della tried to hide the illegitimacy.

=== 1926-1933: Norma Jeane's early years ===
Gladys lacked parenting skills and had a lifestyle that did not suit motherhood. She did not have viable daycare options and needed her job to earn a living. She also experienced severe postpartum depression and was unable to take care of Norma Jeane. On one occasion, Grace prevented Gladys from stabbing her daughter. Taraborrelli stated that Gladys accused Grace of trying to poison the baby and then stabbed her with a knife.

Within two weeks of Norma Jeane's birth, Gladys placed her baby with a foster family who lived 16 miles (26 km) from her, (Note: Banner states that Gladys put Norma Jeane in a foster home when she was three months of age.) Evangelical Christians Albert and Ida Bolender in the rural town of Hawthorne, California. The Bolenders lived across the street from Della, Baker's mother. Gladys initially moved in with the Bolenders and shared a room with Norma Jeane until she was six months old. She then returned to Hollywood to manage an increase in her workload. Gladys visited Norma Jeane and took her on trolley cars to the beach, picnics, restaurants, and other outings on the weekends, sometimes spending the night, but the frequency waned over time. Although she regularly paid $25 (equivalent to $455 in 2025) for Norma Jeane's care, Gladys became "for the most part an irregular, shadowy visitor at the edge of Norma Jeane's life."

The Bolenders gave Norma Jeane a stable childhood and taught her proper conduct, morality, and religion. At some point, Norma Jeane visited her mother on the weekends and enjoyed her mother's carefree lifestyle and her friends. Their time was spent on walks, meals with friends, movie-watching, and attending church. Although Baker could be carefree, "the problem for Norma Jeane was that she saw Gladys in too many negative moods and situations not to be troubled by her." She often called Baker "the woman with the red hair."

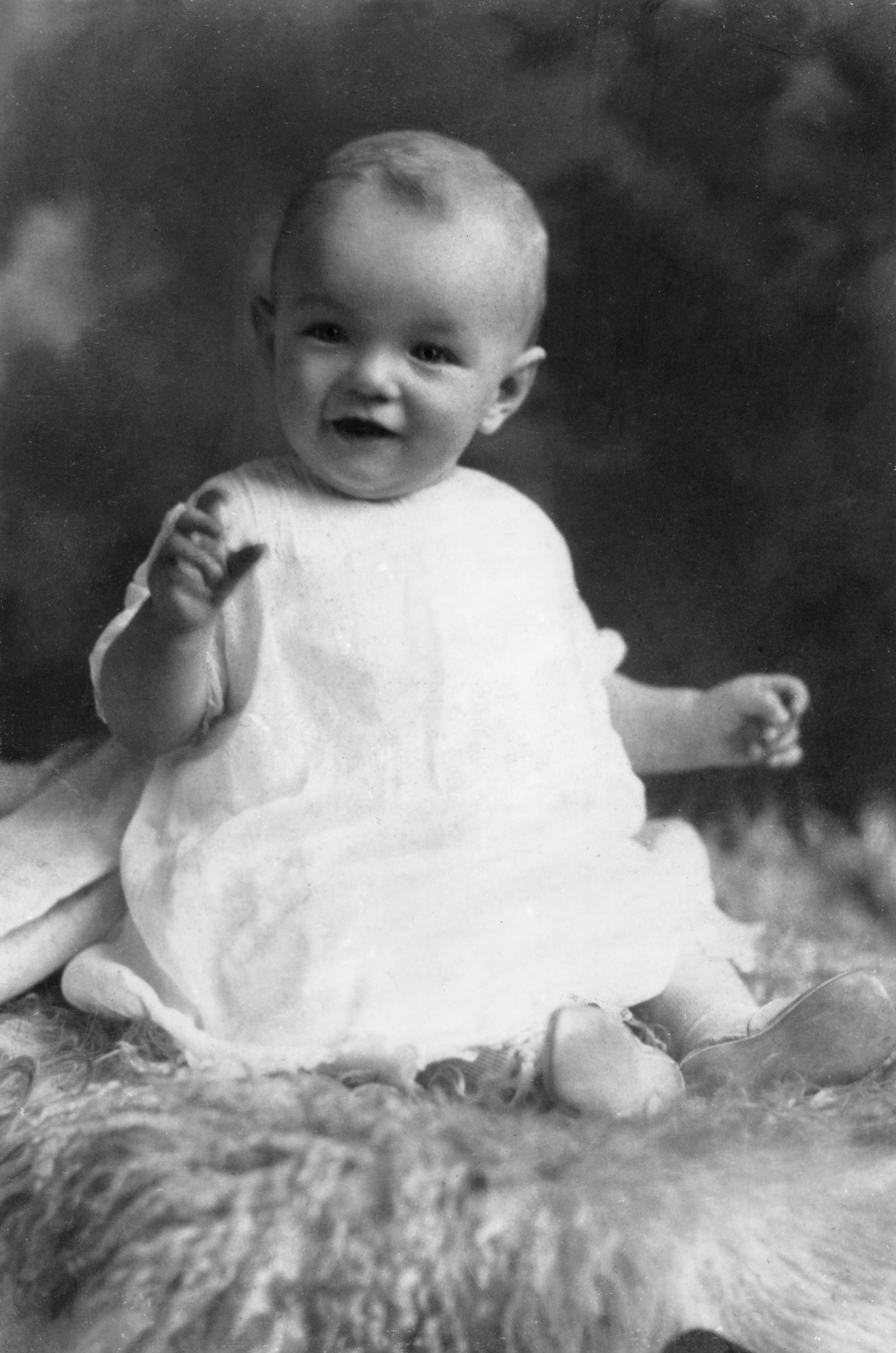
Norma Jeane as an infant in 1927

In early 1927, Baker moved into Della's house, as Della had developed a weak heart, respiratory problems, degenerative heart disease, and acute depression. In the spring, she had a stroke, which led to "unpredictable shifts of mood and temper", along with hallucinations. According to biographer Keith Badman, Della tried to smother Norma Jeane with a pillow in July 1927 for no reason. On August 4, Della was diagnosed with manic-depressive psychosis. She died on August 23, 1927, of a heart attack during a manic seizure while committed to the Norwalk State Hospital. Baker's brother Marion disappeared in October 1929 and was pronounced dead in 1939. On October 24, 1929, a fire broke out at the Consolidated Film Industry, gutting the building and destroying millions of films. Baker is credited with saving a number of lives when she escorted women from the editing studio to outside of the building. Even though her mother had died and her brother was missing, Baker was relatively stable in 1930.

In the summer of 1933, Baker bought a small house in Hollywood with a loan from the Home Owners' Loan Corporation and moved her daughter in with her. They shared the house with lodgers, actors George and Maude Atkinson and their daughter, Nellie. (Note: The Atkinsons were former vaudeville actors from England. They were likely Norma Jeane's foster family between June and October 1933, when they moved into Baker's house.) In the summer, while Baker worked at a film lab, Norma Jeane spent the days at theaters watching films.

=== 1933-1952: Mental issues ===
In August 1933, Norma Jeane lived with Baker and a British couple named George and Maud Atkinson in her mother's house, and Grace looked after Baker's and Norma Jeane's affairs. In the fall of 1933, Baker's son Jackie died of kidney disease, and Baker blamed Norma Jeane for living. Her studio went on strike weeks later. Around this time, Baker and Norma Jeane moved in with Grace and her husband, Doc Goddard. Baker learned in October 1933 that her grandfather Tilford Hogan killed himself. In late 1933, Baker had become very upset when she learned that Norma Jeane had been sexually abused. (Note: There was no clear identification of an abuser, but there are theories that it may have been Doc Goddard who had come to Los Angeles in 1933 and married Grace in 1935, according to Norma Jeane's first husband Jim Dougherty; an "inopportune thirteen-year-old cousin", or actor Murray Kinnell, who was a boarder at Baker's house when Norma Jeane was molested.) Baker also became despondent and inconsolable believing that she would likely experience mental illness like her parents and grandfather. She may have also been depressed for having neglected her children. Norma Jeane and Grace cared for her and tried to comfort her, but Baker continued to cry and failed to get the rest she needed. She received medicine from a neurologist, but she had violent reactions to the psychotropic drugs. As Baker's condition worsened, the Goddards sent Norma Jeane to live with the Atkinsons while they tried to figure out what to do.

In January 1934, Baker had a mental breakdown in front of eight-year-old Norma Jeane, who was forced to witness her mother flailing and screaming until the police arrived. Baker was diagnosed with paranoid schizophrenia, and after several months in a rest home, she was committed to the Los Angeles General Hospital. She was considered incompetent to take care of herself. After she was deemed insane and the state hospital had done all it could to manage Baker's chronic state of depression and agitation, as well as her preoccupation with religion, Grace filed papers in late 1934 for Baker to be committed to Norwalk State Hospital (Metropolitan State Hospital in Norwalk, California).

The Atkinsons returned to England in late 1934 and initially, Norma Jeane lived with Grace's sister and brother-in-law, Enid and Sam Knebelkamp. She was also cared for by Grace's aunt, Ana Lower. Norma Jeane became a ward of the state, and Grace became Baker's guardian and the sole person responsible to oversee Baker and Norma Jeane's affairs. Grace sold Baker's house in June 1935 and the Atkinsons moved to the Hollywood Hills without Norma Jeane. After living with the Goddards for a while, Doc said that he did not want to care for Norma Jeane anymore, so Grace reluctantly brought her to the Los Angeles Orphan's Home, though she would visit her frequently and bring her presents. In June 1937, Norma Jeane moved back in with the Goddards, but was frightened by Doc, who she claimed was often drunk and sexually threatened her. At one point, he reportedly attempted to molest her.

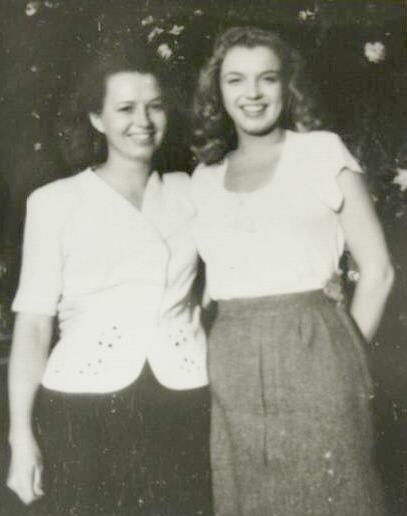
Berniece Baker Miracle (left) and Norma Jeane Mortensen (later Marilyn Monroe, right), Baker's two daughters, in 1944

After an escape attempt, Baker was transferred from Norwalk State Hospital to the Agnews State Mental Hospital (now Agnews Developmental Center), near San Francisco, a more secure facility. By June 1939, Baker lived at a clinic-supervised boardinghouse in San Francisco. By the mid-1940s, Baker had been released by Agnews and moved to Portland, Oregon. In April 1946, Baker traveled to southern California by bus and Norma Jeane took her into her apartment in Ana Lower's duplex. Baker helped Norma Jeane schedule modeling appointments and with the shopping. After several months, she had trouble adjusting to living with people and moved out of Norma Jeane's apartment. Concerned that reporters might find out about Baker's mental illness, Norma Jeane, then going by Marilyn Monroe, said that both of her parents were dead.

Baker was married for a third time in 1949, to the electrician John Stewart Eley. Baker claimed that Eley was an abusive alcoholic and filed for divorce in February 1952. The situation was complicated by another woman who claimed to have married Eley before 1949. Eley died on April 23, 1952, and the other woman was awarded his estate.

Norma Jean Baker lived with Catherine Wilson Blair & family during the summer of 1935. Grace came back on Sept 13,1935 and picked her up and took her straight to the orphanage as ward #3483

=== 1952-1984: Final years and death ===
Out of the hospital, Baker worked at a nursing home in the Eagle Rock neighborhood of Los Angeles and as a housekeeper in Los Angeles. She was sent money regularly by Norma Jeane, who became an actress under the stage name Marilyn Monroe (adopting Baker's maiden name). In fall of 1952, Baker returned to Grace's house, where she suffered another nervous breakdown. Monroe, who was present, called the police and watched as her mother was whisked away to a hospital. Baker was admitted to Rockhaven Sanitarium in 1953 and was supported by Monroe with $250 per month. Monroe's business manager, Inez Melson, cared for Grace until 1962 and was the administratrix of Monroe's estate after her death.

The last time Baker ever saw Monroe was in the summer of 1962. During this last meeting, which took place on the lawn at Rockhaven, Monroe tried to persuade her mother to take her prescribed Thorazine. Baker refused, saying that she only needed prayers, not medicine. Before Baker left, Monroe slipped a flask of alcohol into her purse. "You're such a good girl, Norma Jeane," Baker said before leaving.

Following Monroe's death on August 5, 1962, Baker was left a trust fund of $100,000 by her daughter, of which she received $5,000 per year. She made multiple attempts to escape from the sanitarium. In 1963, she was reported to have walked 15 miles to Lakeview Terrace Baptist Church. After being transferred to Camarillo State Mental Hospital, she was released in 1967, lived with her daughter Berniece, and moved into a retirement home in Gainesville, Florida, where she died of heart failure on March 11, 1984.

== In popular culture ==
Baker's mental health made headlines early in her daughter's career. In an interview with the Los Angeles Daily News, Monroe stated:

My mother spent many years at the hospital. Through the Los Angeles County, my guardian placed me in several foster families and I spent more than a year at the Los Angeles Orphanage. I haven't known my mother intimately, and since I'm an adult, and able to help her, I have contacted her. Now I help her and I want to keep helping her as long as she needs me.

Over the years, Baker's relationship with her children became a subject of debate and was addressed in many films about Monroe, such as My Week With Marilyn (2011), where she is mentioned but not portrayed onscreen; The Secret Life of Marilyn Monroe (2015), where she is played by Susan Sarandon and Eva Amurri; and Blonde (2022), where she is played by Julianne Nicholson.

== Sources ==
- Banner, Lois (2012). Marilyn: The Passion and the Paradox. Bloomsbury. ISBN 978-1-4088-3133-5.
- Churchwell, Sarah (2004). The Many Lives of Marilyn Monroe. Granta Books. ISBN 978-0-312-42565-4.
- Leaming, Barbara (1998). Marilyn Monroe. Three Rivers Press. ISBN 978-0-609-80553-4.
- Monroe, Marilyn; Hecht, Ben (1974). My Story. New York: Stein and Day. ISBN 9780812817072. OCLC 461777186.
- Spoto, Donald (2001). Marilyn Monroe: The Biography. Cooper Square Press. ISBN 978-0-8154-1183-3.
- Taraborrelli, J. Randy (2009). The Secret Life of Marilyn Monroe. Grand Central Publishing. ISBN 978-0-446-55095-6.
