= Nebraska State Hospital =

Insane asylum in Lincoln, Nebraska

Coordinates: 40.768°N 96.733°W

Nebraska State Hospital, also known as the Nebraska Asylum for the Insane, the Lincoln State Hospital and the Lincoln Regional Center was an insane asylum established near Lincoln, Nebraska in 1870. Due to the understanding of mental health in the late 19th and early 20th centuries, the facility treated everything from alcoholism to epilepsy and syphilis. Among its former staff is Agnes Richards, who went on to establish the Rockhaven Sanitarium.

While the original campus was nearly five hundred acres, it currently operates as the Lincoln Regional Center, a two hundred and fifty bed psychiatric hospital on a hundred-acre campus.
