= Metropolitan State Hospital =

Metropolitan State Hospital is the name of

- Metropolitan State Hospital (California)
- Metropolitan State Hospital (Massachusetts)
