= Daily Pilot =

American daily newspaper

- Type: Daily newspaper
- Owner: Los Angeles Times
- Founder: M.H. Swain
- Editor: Carol Cormaci
- Founded: 1907; 119 years ago
- Language: English
- City: Fountain Valley, California
- Country: United States
- Website: dailypilot.com

The Daily Pilot is a daily newspaper published by the Los Angeles Times to serve the communities of Sunset Beach, Huntington Beach, Fountain Valley, Newport Beach, Costa Mesa and Laguna Beach in Orange County, California.

The Daily Pilot is one of the publications of Times Community News, which is a subsidiary of the Los Angeles Times.

== History ==
In March 1907, M.H. Swain, of Long Beach, founded a weekly newspaper called the Newport News. In July 1907, Swain sold the News to Raymond Wayman, former editor of the Huntington Beach News. The sale was for $10 and Swain left town without telling Wayman that the business was up to $2,000 in debt. In June 1908, Wayman sold the paper to Walter A. Cornelius, who published it for a dozen years until 1920, when he sold the News to Charles B. Wheatley.

In 1922, Samuel A. Meyer, owner of the Chandler Arizonan, purchased the News from Wheatley. In 1925, Meyer purchased the Balboa Bulletin and Costa Mesa Courier from J. Winterbourne and consolidated them together to form the Balboa Times. In 1928, Meyer was sued for libel by H.L. Sherman, publisher of a rival paper called the Harbor Herald at Newport Beach. He sought $55,000 in damages. The jury deliberated for under an hour and then awarded Sherman $1, plus another $100 for attorney's fee. In 1946, Meyers retired as publisher after two decades and was succeeded by Sam D. Porter, who had acquired a controlling interest in the business.

In March 1948, Porter expanded the paper from a semi-weekly into a daily with a circulation of 2,500. The combined Newport News and Balboa Times was called the Daily News-Times. In December 1948, Porter dissolved his partnership with Lucius Smith III, who became a co-owner at some point, and the business entered receivership. Clyde F. Rex published the paper for a month, before it was sold at auction to Victor W. Weathers and Homer O. Cotton, former publishers of the South Gate Press-Tribune and Indo Date Palm. Shortly after the sale, the new owners acquired the Newport Bay Post and Shopping News.

In March 1949, the News-Times reverted to a semi-weekly. In April 1949, Ben Otis Reddick, publisher of the Newport-Balboa Press, acquired the company from Weathers and Cotton. In 1954, Reddick consolidated the News-Times and the Press to form the Newport Harbor News-Press. In 1961, Times Mirror purchased the Orange Coast Daily Pilot. At that time the paper had three editions: The Costa Mesa Globe Herald Daily Pilot, the Newport Harbor Daily Pilot, and Huntington Beach Daily Pilot. The combined paid circulation was 17,000. In April 1962, Reddick sold the News-Press to the Ridder family, who owned a chain papers including the Long Beach Press-Telegram and Pasadena Star-News. In September 1962, Times Mirror acquired the News-Press, and then merged it into the Daily Pilot.

The Daily Pilot and three weekly papers were acquired by Ingersoll Publications in 1982, which purchased the Huntington Beach Independent in 1985. The Daily Pilot and Independent were sold to Adams Communications in 1988. A year later Robert E. Page, former publisher of the Chicago Sun-Times, bought the papers with financial backing from New York businessman Elliot Stein. The Glendale News Press and Burbank Leader were acquired a week later. In 1993, Times Mirror bought the Daily Pilot, News Press, Independent and Leader from Page Group Publishing. In 2016, the Huntington Beach Independent and the Laguna Beach Coastline Pilot were merged into the Daily Pilot.
