= Outlook Newspapers Group =

American newspaper and print media publisher

- Status: Active
- Founded: 1998; 27 years ago
- Country of origin: United States
- Publication types: Burbank Leader, Glendale News-Press, La Cañada Outlook Valley Sun, Pasadena Outlook, San Marino Tribune, South Pasadena Review
- Nonfiction topics: Local news
- Owner(s): Charles Plowman
- Official website: outlooknewspapers.com

Outlook Newspapers Group is an American newspaper and print media publisher focused on the Verdugos region of Los Angeles County. Its headquarters are in La Cañada Flintridge, California.

== History ==
The history of Outlook Newspapers Group began in 1998 with the publication of the La Cañada Outlook newspaper.

The Pasadena Outlook was launched in 2008.

In January 2020, Outlook purchased the San Marino Tribune and the South Pasadena Review.

In April 2020, in response to the economic effects of the COVID-19 pandemic, the Los Angeles Times announced the closure of the Burbank Leader, the Glendale News-Press, and the La Cañada Valley Sun. Outlook Newspapers Group acquired all three newspapers shortly thereafter. As a result of this purchase, the two La Cañada Flintridge newspapers, La Cañada Outlook and La Cañada Valley Sun, were merged into one publication named the La Cañada Outlook Valley Sun.

== Publications ==
- Burbank Leader – Burbank, California
- Glendale News-Press – Glendale, California
- La Cañada Outlook Valley Sun – La Cañada Flintridge, California
- Pasadena Outlook – Pasadena, California
- San Marino Tribune – San Marino, California
- South Pasadena Review – South Pasadena, California
