= Burbank Leader =

Weekly newspaper in Burbank, California

- Type: Weekly newspaper
- Format: Tabloid
- Owner: Outlook Newspapers Group
- Founder: E.M. McClure
- Founded: 1908; 118 years ago
- Language: English
- Headquarters: Burbank, California
- Circulation: 5,000 (as of April 2020)
- Sister newspapers: Glendale News-Press
- Website: outlooknewspapers.com/burbankleader/

The Burbank Leader is a weekly newspaper published by the Outlook Newspapers Group in Burbank, California.

== History ==
In 1908, E.M. McClure published the first edition of the Burbank Review. In 1911, he sold the paper to H.E. Lawrence, who then merged it with the Independent. In 1914, Mr. Lawrence died.

In 1916, his widow Ida M. Lawrence sold the paper to Samuel M. Greene and C.M. Brosius. In 1917, Judge Charles E. Salisbury bought the paper, and he was eventually succeeded by W.P. Coffman.

In 1920, Harvey L. Ling purchased the paper, and soon bought and absorbed a rival paper called the Pathfinder. In 1926, the Review was expanded into a daily. In 1930, Ling purchased and absorbed the Burbank Daily Tribune. In 1948, Niver W. Beaman became a co-owner.

In 1950, Southern California Associated Newspapers, a subsidiary of Copley Press, acquired the Review from Ling. In 1974, Copley Press sold four Los Angeles dallies, including the Daily Review and Glendale News Press, along with nine weekly newspapers to Morris Newspapers. In 1976, Morris sold two dallies and five weeklies in the L.A. area to California Offset Printers.

In 1980, California Offset Printers sold nine papers including the Daily Review and News Press to Ingersoll Publications. At that time the News Press had a circulation of 20,621 and the Daily Review had a circulation of 10,724. By 1985, the Daily Review's circulation had fallen to around 8,000. At that time the paper's print schedule was decreased to twice a week and the publication was renamed to the Burbank Leader.

In 1989, Page Group Publishing, which had just bought the Orange Coast Daily Pilot and the Huntington Beach Independent, acquired the Burbank Leader, Foothill Leader and News Press from Ingersoll. In 1993, Times Mirror Company bought the newspaper group.

On April 18, 2020, it was announced by the Los Angeles Times that the newspaper would cease publication. Before the closure, the print circulation was around 5,000 copies. On April 30, 2020, the Burbank Leader was purchased by the Outlook Newspapers Group. The newspaper continued to be published by its new owner.

== See also ==
- Glendale News-Press
- Outlook Newspapers Group
