= Glendale News-Press =

Newspaper in Glendale, California

- Type: Weekly newspaper
- Format: Tabloid
- Owner: Charlie Plowman
- Publisher: LCM-News, Inc., dba Outlook Newspaper Group
- Editor: Camila Castellanos
- Founded: 1905; 121 years ago
- Language: English
- Headquarters: La Cañada Flintridge, California
- Circulation: 5,000 (as of April 2020)
- Website: glendalenewspress.outlooknewspapers.com

The Glendale News-Press is an American weekly newspaper published in Glendale, California since 1928. Since its purchase by Outlook Newspapers Group in 2020, the Glendale News-Press' office has been located in La Cañada Flintridge. It has been called the newspaper of record for Glendale.

== History ==
=== Early years ===
Glendale News, a weekly newspaper, was founded on May 1, 1905, by E. M. McClure and J. F. Boughton. McClure bought out Boughton in September 1905, then sold the paper on January 1, 1907, to E. B. Riggs and J. C. Sherer. The Glendale News became a daily newspaper on August 23, 1913.

Frank S. Chase launched the weekly Glendale Press in May 1910. Chase sold the paper in December 1919 to printer J.H. Folz. In February 1920, J.W. Usilton bought two-thirds interest in the paper, and the pair ran the Press as a weekly newspaper until March 1, 1921. That day, the Press was renamed the Glendale Daily Press. Soon thereafter, Folz sold his interest in the paper to Thomas D. Watson, and Usilton remained involved as a part owner. In September 1921, publisher F.W. Kellogg bought control of the Glendale Daily Press and retained Watson as a general manager.

=== Growth and ownership changes ===
As part of a complex transaction involving several other Southern California newspapers, Ira Clifton Copley's Copley Press bought and combined the Glendale Daily Press and the Glendale Evening News seven years later, issuing the first edition of the consolidated Glendale News-Press on February 15, 1928. The News-Press became part of Copley's Southern California Associated Newspapers, comprising eight daily newspapers in Los Angeles County.

In 1932, Copley acquired full ownership of the News-Press from Samuel G. McClure and J.D. Funk in exchange for the Santa Monica Evening Outlook. Construction began on a new facility for the News-Press on March 6, 1948, on a site that extended from 111 North Isabel Street, across the street from Glendale City Hall. The 35,000-square-foot building was completed in the autumn of 1948, and the Glendale News-Press staff and office moved to the new site in October 1948.

Copley sold the News-Press and the Burbank Daily Review to Morris Newspapers in 1974; however Morris sold off the papers to California Offset Printers two years later. Ingersoll Publications bought the papers in 1980. Page Group Publishing, owners of the Orange Coast Daily Pilot and the Huntington Beach Independent, acquired the paper from Ingersoll in 1989.

=== Los Angeles Times ===
In 1993, Times Mirror bought the newspaper as part of a group of newspapers dubbed California Community News. It was then announced that the Los Angeles Times' Glendale section would be replaced with the Glendale News-Press and the Foothill Leader in Glendale, Atwater Village, Eagle Rock, Glassell Park, Highland Park, La Cañada Flintridge, La Crescenta-Montrose and Los Feliz.

The Glendale News-Press' Isabel Street building, which the paper had occupied since 1948, sustained extensive damage during the 1994 Northridge earthquake. The newspaper moved to the Sterling Bank building, at 425 West Broadway. In 1999, the newspaper again moved, to the former F. W. Woolworth Company building, at 111 West Wilson Avenue.

In February 2002, the Foothill Leader ceased publication and the News-Press dropped "Glendale" from its masthead, with the News-Press officially adding La Cañada Flintridge to its coverage area. In November 2004, the News-Press returned "Glendale" to its masthead and reestablished the Foothill Leader.

In 2008, former News-Press publisher Carroll W. Parcher was posthumously inducted into the California Newspaper Hall of Fame.

In 2010, to better serve Glendale's large Armenian population, the Glendale News-Press added an Armenian language translation feature to its website.

A comic published in the October 4, 2019 issue, which juxtaposed an Artsakh Street sign with a character lamenting, "I miss the old Maryland Avenue," drew backlash from some readers who viewed it as xenophobic toward Glendale's Armenian community.

=== Outlook Newspapers ===
In April 2020, in response to the economic effects of the COVID-19 pandemic, the Los Angeles Times announced the closure of the Glendale News-Press, along with the Burbank Leader and La Cañada Valley Sun. In response, Representative Adam Schiff called the closures "a tremendous loss, and a threat to democracy." All three were soon purchased by Outlook Newspapers Group, with publisher Charlie Plowman stating that "local journalism is critical to the life of a healthy city." With this sale, Glendale News-Press moved to Outlook Newspapers' La Cañada Flintridge office.

== Employees ==
=== Unionization ===
In January 2018, the newspaper's staff, as part of the broader Los Angeles Times staff, voted to unionize and finalized their first union contract on October 16, 2019. The labor union, the Los Angeles Times Guild, applied to the Glendale News-Press until its 2020 closure and sale to Outlook Newspapers Group.

== Awards and recognition ==
Glendale News-Press was nominated for Los Angeles Blade's 2025 Best of LGBTQ LA Awards, in the "Best News Source Ally" category.

== See also ==
- Burbank Leader
- Crescenta Valley Weekly
- Outlook Newspapers Group
