= Berniece Baker Miracle =

American writer (1919–2014)

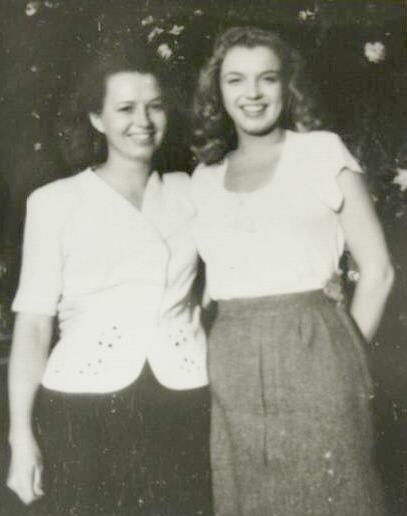
- Miracle (left) with her half-sister Marilyn Monroe, c. 1944
- Born: Berniece Inez Gladys Baker; July 30, 1919; Venice, California, U.S
- Died: May 25, 2014 (aged 94); Asheville, North Carolina, U.S
- Resting place: Pineville Cemetery, Kentucky
- Notable work: My Sister Marilyn (1994)
- Spouse: Paris Miracle (m. 1938; died 1990)
- Children: 1
- Mother: Gladys Pearl Baker
- Relatives: Marilyn Monroe (half-sister)

Berniece Inez Gladys Miracle (née Baker; July 30, 1919 – May 25, 2014) was an American writer, known for her memoir My Sister Marilyn (1994) about her half-sister, actress Marilyn Monroe.

== Biography ==
Berniece Inez Gladys Baker was born on July 30, 1919, in Venice, California. Her parents, Gladys Pearl Monroe and Jasper Newton "Jap" Baker, had married in 1917, when Monroe was 14. They divorced four years later.

Jasper kidnapped Berniece and her older brother, Robert Jasper “Kermit” Baker (b. 1918) and took them back to his native state of Kentucky to be raised with his family. There he married twice more and had two sons, Jasper Frederick and Cleon Baker, born to Gertrude Ritz Engle and Margaret J. Hunter Baker, respectively.

Monroe tried to get her children back, but no one would help her and eventually, she gave up. She later remarried and had a third child, Norma Jeane Mortenson, born in 1926.

In 1933, Baker's full brother Robert died at the age of fifteen from kidney failure, a complication of tuberculosis.

In 1935, Baker began attending Pineville High School. She married Paris Miracle in 1938. They had a daughter, Mona Rae Miracle, born in 1939, who eventually became an author. Their marriage lasted until Paris's death in October 1990.

While Miracle was pregnant, her mother wrote and told her for the first time about her half-sister, Norma Jeane Mortenson. The half-sisters exchanged letters and pictures and met in 1944, when Norma Jeane was eighteen.

After the meeting, Mortenson sent a postcard to her sister:

"Dearest Berniece, I just can't tell you both how I enjoyed meeting you. I want to thank you for everything, for I had a wonderful time. Love, Norma Jeane. P.S. Berniece, I will write to you soon. Give Mona Rae my love."

Around the same time, Mortenson began a modeling career and became an actress under the stage name Marilyn Monroe. She remained in contact with Berniece, who visited her in 1961 in her New York home. That year, Monroe had divorced her third husband, playwright Arthur Miller, and had undergone a cholecystectomy.

A year later, Monroe died of a barbiturate overdose. She left Miracle $10,000 in her final will. Miracle, Monroe's second husband Joe DiMaggio and her business manager Inez Melson arranged Marilyn's funeral, Miracle choosing the casket and dress.

In a 2012 interview with ina.fr, she said:

"I don't think she committed suicide. It could have been an accident, because I had just talked to her a short time before. She told me what she had planned to do, she had just bought a new house and she was working on the curtains of the windows. She had so many things to look forward to and she was so happy."

Throughout her life, Miracle avoided the media. She worked as a manufacturing inspector, bookkeeper and costume designer. Miracle died on May 25, 2014, aged 94, in Asheville, North Carolina. She is buried beside her husband, Paris at the Pineville Cemetery in Pineville, Kentucky.

== My Sister Marilyn ==
My Sister Marilyn: A Memoir of Marilyn Monroe was published on June 1, 1994 (on Monroe's birthday and 50 years after the half-sisters first met). Miracle co-authored the book with her daughter Mona; it tells about her rare meet-ups with Monroe, up until the latter's death.

It also addresses the mental issues of their mother, Gladys. The sisters both had troubled childhoods. Because of their mother's problems, they each felt the lack of a nurturing maternal figure:

We share the same mother, who early in our lives was diagnosed as mentally ill. We grew up feeling abandoned and, though both of us were told we were pretty and talented, we still needed courage and strength. We got that from each other.

The memoir features exclusive photographs and received positive reviews by outlets such as Entertainment Weekly, which wrote that "this portrait of Marilyn is irreplaceable." It is the only authorized biography of Monroe's family.
