= Crescenta Valley Weekly =

U.S. newspaper

- Type: Weekly newspaper
- Format: Tabloid
- Owner: Robin Goldsworthy
- Founded: 2009; 17 years ago
- Headquarters: La Crescenta-Montrose, California
- Circulation: 8,000
- Website: crescentavalleyweekly.com

The Crescenta Valley Weekly is a weekly newspaper published in La Crescenta-Montrose, California, United States. It covers local news, community events, and sports in the Crescenta Valley and Glendale.

== History ==
The Crescenta Valley Weekly was started in 2009, following the closure of a community newspaper, and in the wake of the Station Fire.

In a 2024 article, founder Robin Goldsworthy stated "I didn’t create any 'buzz' about the paper being launched because my primary competition was the Glendale News-Press – which was owned by the deep pockets Los Angeles Times – and I didn’t want resources – whether financial or personnel – being poured into the Crescenta Valley."

== Circulation and demographics ==
The newspaper is distributed on Thursdays to Burbank, Glendale, Eagle Rock, La Cañada Flintridge, La Crescenta-Montrose, Sunland-Tujunga and Toluca Lake.

The average reader is above age 50. 70% of readers are homeowners, and the average household income is $86,700.

== See also ==
- Glendale News-Press
