= Agnes Richards =

American psychiatric nurse (1883–1967)

- Born: February 16, 1883; US
- Died: 1967 (aged 83–84)
- Occupation: Psychiatric nurse
- Known for: Rockhaven Sanitarium
- Children: 1

Agnes Mary Richards earlier Agnes M. Travis (16 February 1883 – 1967) was an American psychiatric nurse who founded and then led Rockhaven Sanitarium, which opened in 1923. The sanitarium has funding to be converted in to a museum that will record women's history and how her sanitorium supplied "compassionate care for women".

== Life ==
Richards was married in 1904 in Chicago to David Travis, with whom she had a son, Clarence. David died in 1906. Subsequently, Richards was employed as servant at the Nebraska State Hospital and Iowa's Independence State Hospital, where she met James Richards. She married Richards in 1917 and they moved to San Bernardino, California where she received her RN before opening Rockhaven. It was one of the first private mental health facilities in California, and served women exclusively, caring for those “suffering mild mental and nervous disorders”, including some from Hollywood.

By 1930, Richards and her husband had divorced. This was a time when divorced women were still stigmatized, and part of her mission in opening Rockhaven was so that women would be treated with respect. She required the women at Rockhaven to dress and attend meals in the dining hall, believing this would boost their self-esteem and overall well-being as a consequence. That said, as some residents aged and in some cases became less ambulatory (a requirement for admission), Richards did not force them to find care elsewhere; instead a hospital was built on the property to provide nursing care.

As the neighborhood around Rockhaven transitioned from a rural to suburban environment, some nearby residents objected to living near a mental health facility. Richards applied to expand in 1928 and met with accusations that she was an alcoholic and her "insane patients... ran screaming down the streets of the suburbs at unenjoyable hours of the night". Richards brought a US$100,000 suit for slander and won.

== Death and legacy ==
Richards died in 1967 and she had worked at Rockhaven until "months before" her death. Her granddaughter then operated the sanitorium. Rockhaven operated until 2006. The "Friends of Rockhaven" made sure that Rockhaven Sanitarium was listed in the National Register of Historic Places in June 2016 and in 2021 the Friends received $8m arranged by Senator Anthony Portantino to convert the sanitarium into the Rockhaven Mental Health History Museum. The museum will record women' history and how her sanitorium supplied "compassionate care for women".
