= Metropolitan State Hospital (California) =

Coordinates: 33.9277°N 118.0725°W

- California Department of Mental Health
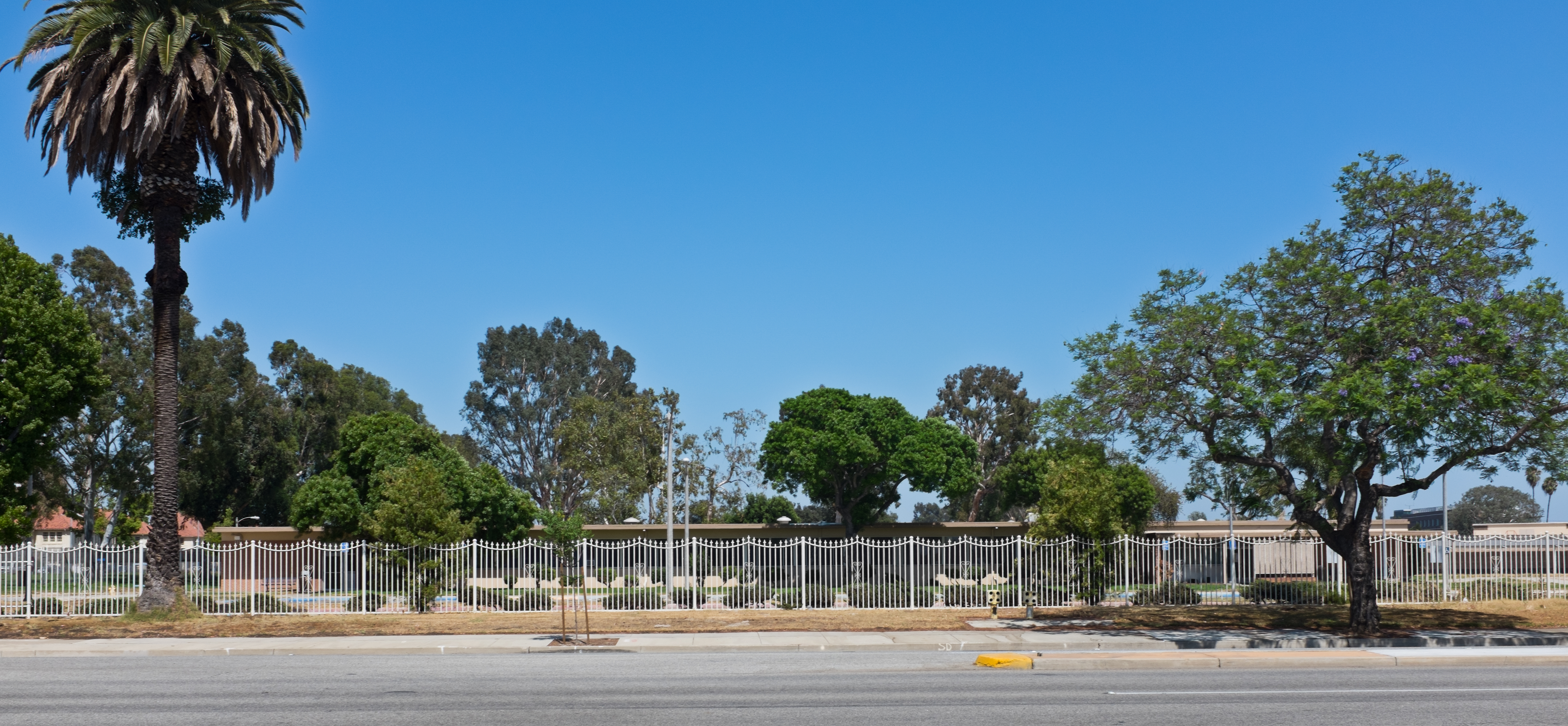

Geography
- Location: 11400 Norwalk Blvd, Norwalk, California, United States

Organization
- Type: Specialist

Services
- Speciality: Psychiatric

History
- Former name: Norwalk State Hospital
- Founded: 1913

Links
- Website: www.dsh.ca.gov/Metropolitan/
- Lists: Hospitals in California

Metropolitan State Hospital is an American public hospital specializing in psychiatric care for those with mental health concerns, located at 11400 Norwalk Blvd in the city of Norwalk in Los Angeles County, California. As of August 2016 it had 780 patients.

== Services ==
The hospital is operated by the California Department of State Hospitals. Currently it admits four different types of categories for patient intake. The four categories being; incompetent to stand trial (PC 1370), offender with a mental health disorder (PCS 2962/2972), not guilty by reason of insanity (PC 1026), and conservatorship Lanterman-Petris-Short (LPS) Act. The hospital is unique among state facilities serving the mental health patients in that it admits a large proportion of acutely ill psychiatric patients resulting in a rapid turnover rate and a shorter length of stay.

From the 1980s to 1990's, the facility had an Intensive Treatment and Research Unit, which was a male inpatient facility for chronically ill persons with mental disabilities, and was co-sponsored by Metropolitan State Hospital and the University of California, Irvine School of Medicine. The program was a major component of research conducted by the two institutions with the treatment focus directed toward the chronically refractory and treatment-resistant patient.

Specific patient programming utilizes individual and group therapy, occupational and rehabilitation therapies and the management of social and financial problems by developing linkages back to the community. Basic treatment services include psychiatry, psychology, social services, rehabilitation therapies, medical, nursing, pharmacy, dietary, etc.

== History ==
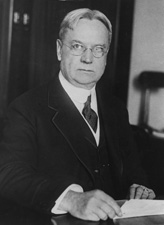
Hiram Johnson was governor of California and appropriated the funds necessary to build the hospital.

In June 1913, based on a study by a group of Los Angeles County Psychiatrists who had projected a need for a Los Angeles area hospital, Governor Hiram Johnson signed Senate Bill No. 739 on June 7, 1913, appropriating authority and funds to create a second state hospital in Southern California for the reception and treatment of California's increasing population of persons with psychiatric disabilities. Three potential sites for the new facility were considered: Beverly Hills, Signal Hill, and Norwalk. The decision to place the hospital in Norwalk was prompted primarily because of its location, with easy access to good roads and railroad service. At its largest, the hospital had a total of 392.30 acres.

The hospital was self-sufficient in its early days. A dairy, garden, pigs, and cows produced income and food products that could be used by the staff and patients. The farm also kept food costs at a minimum, at a time when milk prices alone had increased from 17 cents per gallon in 1916 to 32 cents in 1918 due to the ongoing war.

As the area around the hospital became developed after World War II and the city of Norwalk grew around it, many changes have taken place. The biggest change in patient care has come from the development of psychotropic medications, increased therapies and new community standards. The hospital has since consolidated its grounds and facilities of tudor styled dormitories into its present 162 acres (66 ha).

In 1975, the hospital was the subject of a black-and-white documentary from film makers Richard Cohen and Kevin Rafferty titled Hurry Tomorrow, which alleged coercive drugging of patients with the sedatives chlorpromazine and Prolixin. In December 1976, The CBS Evening News with Walter Cronkite ran a story about patient deaths at Metropolitan and Camarillo State Hospitals, and the story featured scenes from Hurry Tomorrow.

== Accreditation ==
Metropolitan State Hospital is accredited by the Joint Commission (formerly the Joint Commission for the Accreditation of Healthcare Organizations) and certified by the Healthcare Finance Administration. Accreditation is a voluntary process. Medical and psychiatric facilities across the country must request to be surveyed with results evaluated against nationally recognized standards of care.
