= Rockhaven Sanitarium Historic District =

Hospital in Glendale, California, United States

Coordinates: 34.2112°N 118.2384°W

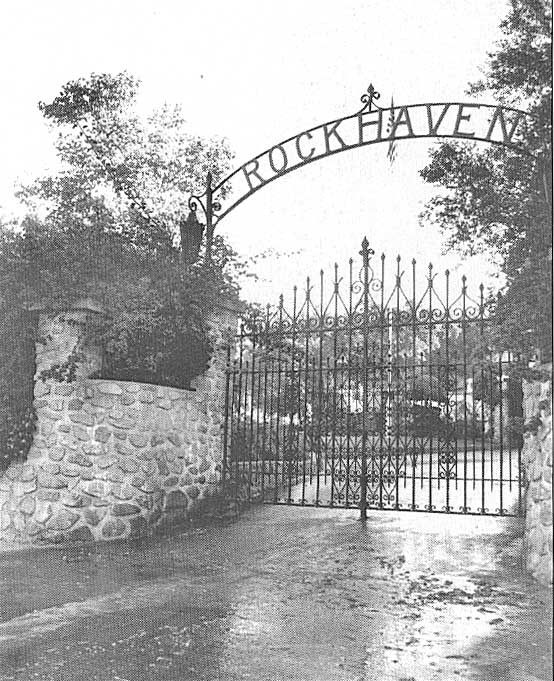
Gates to Rockhaven Sanitarium

The Rockhaven Sanitarium Historic District is located in the Crescenta Valley at 2713 Honolulu Avenue in what is now the City of Glendale, California, United States. The sanitarium for which it is named was opened in 1923 by psychiatric nurse Agnes Richards as a private mental health institution for women with mild mental and nervous disorders. The property was added to the National Register of Historic Places in June 2016 and in 2021 it was announced that it would be developed into a museum.

== Institution ==
Mental health issues from the 15th to 19th centuries were very discriminatory towards women, and often misdiagnosed. At the start of the 20th century the sanatorium movement was spreading around the world and focused on allowing fresh air to flow, and giving room for patients to get exposure to the sun. Rockhaven was inspired by principles of the Cottage Plan of Asylum architecture for mental institutions, first developed in the late nineteenth century. The Cottage Plan placed numerous individual buildings within landscaped gardens in order to create a serene, home-like environment for residents. Rockhaven is one of the best examples of an early twentieth-century woman-owned, women-serving private sanitarium in California, and was one of the first of its type in the nation. It reflects the vision of founder Agnes Richards, R.N., and represents a small, yet significant movement that sought to improve the conditions of mentally ill women in the early twentieth century.

Agnes Traviss Richards, a registered nurse, was inspired to found her own institution when she became discouraged by the way women with mental illness were treated by large, state-run facilities. Having worked in state-run insane asylums in Nebraska, Iowa and Patton State Hospital in San Bernardino, California, she witnessed the atrocities firsthand such as physical abuse, torture, starvation, mental abuse through the treatment as an inmate rather than patient. Women especially were at risk of sexual assaults happening to them during their time in these sanitariums. Richards’ vision was to create a peaceful, home-like setting where women could be cared for surrounded by gardens and lush landscaping. Being located in Montrose California allows for a peaceful setting for the Sanitarium alongside California's desert climate.

== Building and architecture ==
Rockhaven Sanitarium Historic District occupies a 3.4-acre site with several vintage hospital wards and guest cottages. There are a total of fifteen buildings on the property that were erected between 1920 and 1972. Agnes Richards had some buildings relocated to the Rockhaven Sanitarium and others lifted and turned on their foundation to invite sunlight into the rooms. Richards acquired the five Craftsman-style buildings over time and she hired Prescott and Brothers to design the Spanish Colonial Revival architecture style structures which were popular in Southern California in the 1920s and 1930s. Patios and courtyards acted as extensions of the residents’ indoor living quarters inviting privacy and serenity. Outside there were big oak trees, citrus trees, and an abundance of flowers surrounding walkways making the air fresh and fragrant.

== Notable residents ==
Rockhaven Sanitarium became known as the "Screen Actors' Sanitarium", housing starlets and others connected to show business. Class played a role in types of people who resided at Rockhaven Sanitarium. Women of a higher social class who were well off and had the means to pay for the luxury Rockhaven had to offer, were often the residents. Although Agnes would cater this treatment to anyone, no matter race or belief, the sanitarium often catered to women of middle class or upper middle class stature due to the cost of residency and treatment.

Gladys Pearl Baker, mother of actress Marilyn Monroe, lived at Rockhaven from 1952 to 1966. Baker was reported to have escaped from the sanitarium several times; a year after Monroe's death, she received press attention for having walked 15 miles to the Lakeview Terrace Baptist Church.

Billie Burke was a famous Broadway actress and film star who is best known for her role as Glinda the Good Witch in The Wizard of Oz. Burke was a long-time resident of Rockhaven.

Peggy Fears, Broadway actress and legendary Ziegfeld Follies performer-turned-producer who became a real estate financier, died at Rockhaven in August 1994.

Josephine Dillon, famed acting teacher and married at one time to Clark Gable, died at Rockhaven on November 11, 1971, where she had been lovingly cared for during a long illness.

Marion Eleanor Statler Rose, actress best known as the female half of the vaudeville duo Statler & Rose who appeared in technicolor musicals of the time including King of Jazz (1933), entered Rockhaven as a resident in 1994.

Mary Florence Cecilia (Babe) Egan, was the leader of the all-female band The Hollywood Redheads that played throughout the United States, Canada and Europe in the mid-1920s. Egan lived her final years at Rockhaven where she died of a stroke in 1966.

Gwen Lee, a stage and film actress and flapper in silent films of the 1920s.

== Closure and current status ==
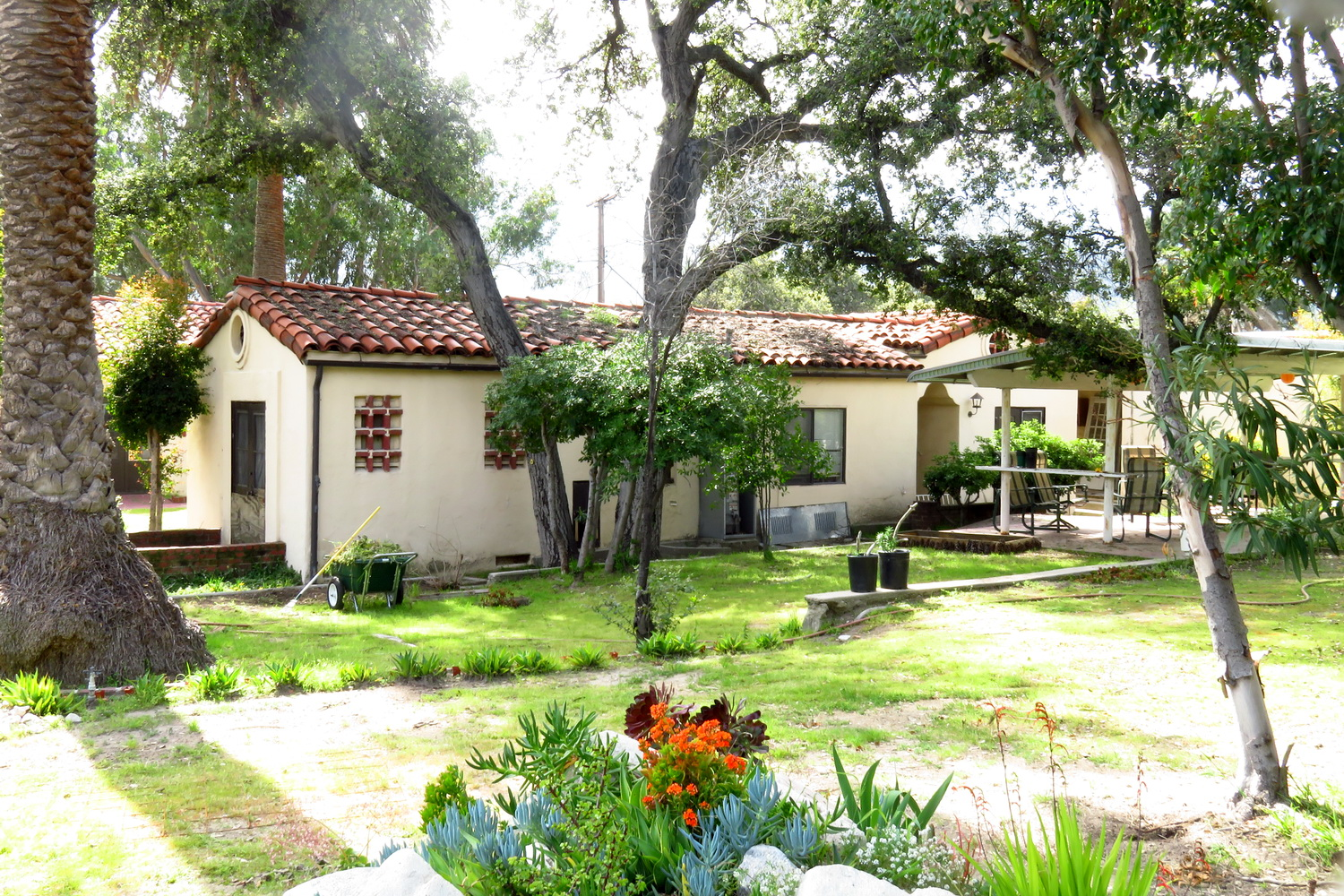

Agnes Richards ran Rockhaven Sanitarium until 1967 when she passed it on to her granddaughter Patricia Traviss. In Traviss' time, Rockhaven changed with the needs of its residents and became popular for the care of elderly women with dementia. In 1971 the San Fernando Earthquake caused a lot of damage to the institution which started its external decline. In 2001 Traviss sold Rockhaven to a large hospital corporation which operated it as Ararat Home of Los Angeles. However, by 2006 they found the upkeep too costly and sold it to developers who planned to scrap the lot and build condos. The community stepped in to stop the demolition and in 2008 the City of Glendale purchased Rockhaven for about $8.25 million with the intent to open the property to the public for use as a community park.

In February 2016, the site was being considered by the City of Glendale for "adaptive reuse." and later that year, for a mental health facility or a shopping center.". However, in 2019 Glendale cut ties with Gangi Development after two years. In July 2021, they received $8 million in state funds toward turning the site into the Rockhaven Mental Health History Museum at the request of Senator Anthony Portantino (D – La Cañada Flintridge) who proposed that the State of California allocate the money to "the City of Glendale to renovate and preserve the historic Rockhaven property for the public to enjoy and appreciate as a museum."

=== Legal disputes ===
The city of Glendale spent $8 Million to buy the Rockhaven Sanitarium which was then repurchased by California State Senator Anthony Portantino to preserve its historic legacy. California's State Historical Resource Commissions and Natural Resource Agency approved the $8 million grant recognizing the sites importance and being in line with the Secretary of Interior's standards for the preservation of historic sites. Friends of Rockhaven, a nonprofit preservationist group, filed a lawsuit against the city of Glendale due to Glendale's lack of care regarding preserving the site, claiming the roofs required maintenance alongside health concern issues of growing mold.

== Legacy ==
=== Historic Designation ===
The California State Historical Resources Commission gave unanimous approval to list the Rockhaven Sanitarium to the California Register of Historical Resources on April 18, 2016. Despite objection by the City of Glendale, the Friends of Rockhaven successfully nominated the Rockhaven Sanitarium for listing in the National Register of Historic Places and it was so designated in June 2016. It is recognized, in part, for being one of only three women's hospitals remaining from its time.

=== The Friends of Rockhaven ===
The Friends of Rockhaven is a 501(c)(3) charity organized to protect the buildings and legacy of Rockhaven Sanitarium with the goal of establishing a park and community center.

=== Goals ===
Friends of Rockhaven focuses are on the sustainability of the sanitarium allowing it to be open for education to the public alongside organizational development through the fundraising, communication and online presence.
