= Norman Mailer bibliography =

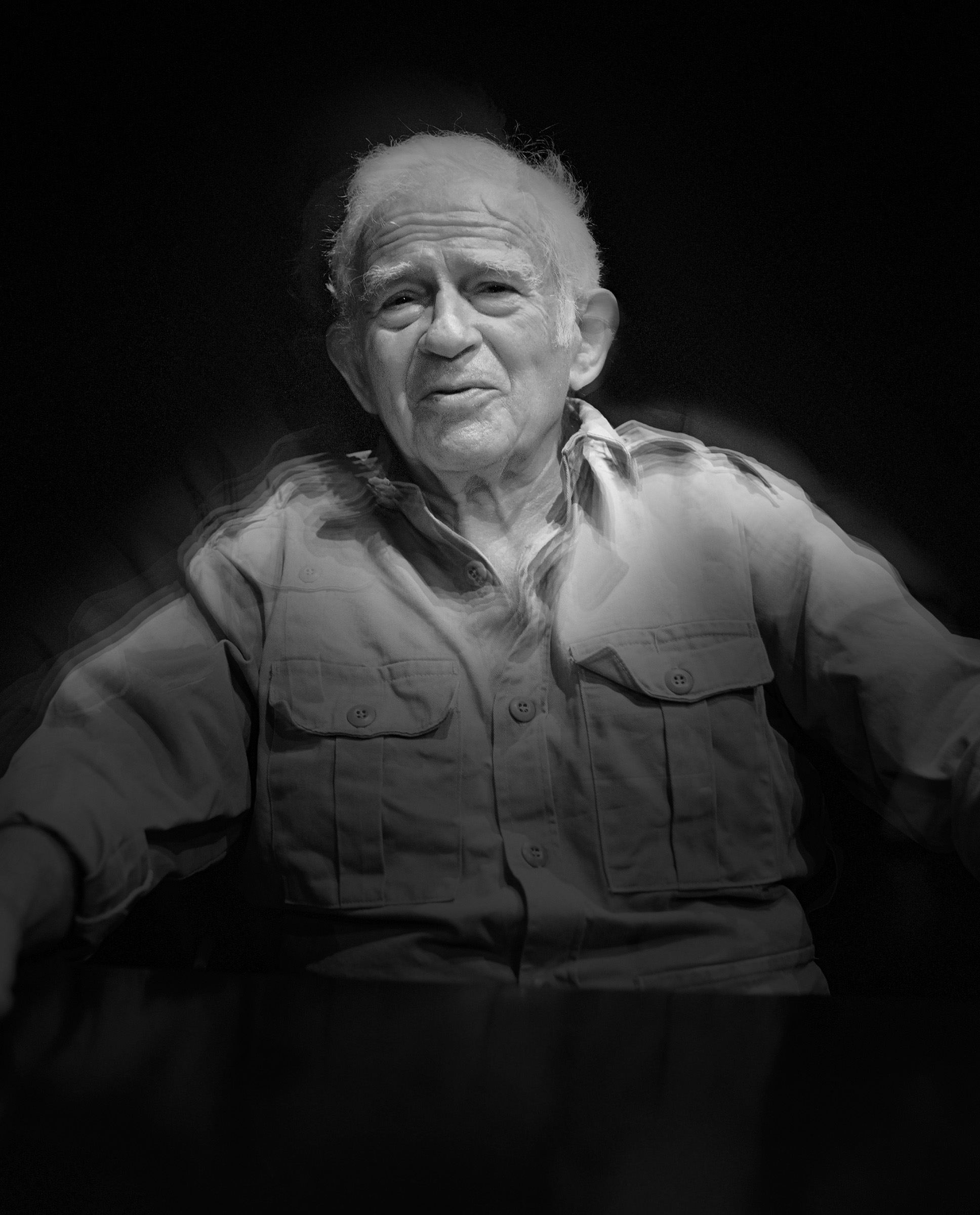
- Mailer in 2002
- Books↙: 52
- Novels↙: 12
- Stories↙: 25
- Collections↙: 15
- Interviews↙: 3
- Nonfiction narratives↙: 13

This Norman Mailer bibliography lists major books (Note: Including short stories. This bibliography might be expanded in the future to include important uncollected works.) by and about Mailer (January 31, 1923 – November 10, 2007), an American novelist, new journalist, essayist, public intellectual, filmmaker, and biographer. Over a fifty-nine-year period, Mailer won two Pulitzer Prizes and had eleven books spend a total of 160 weeks on the New York Times bestseller list. Mailer's output included fiction, non-fiction, poems and essays. Biographer J. Michael Lennon called Mailer the chronicler of the American Century, and a talent whose career has "been at once so brilliant, varied, controversial, improvisational, public, productive, lengthy and misunderstood".

== Chronology ==
Title	Abbr. (Note: Most from Lennon (2008a, pp. 518–519).)	Year	Type	Notes
The Naked and the Dead	NAD	1948	novel	spent 62 weeks on the bestseller list, achieving no. 1; received the Newspaper Guild of New York's "Page One Award"; chosen as one of the four best books of 1948 by Newsweek; original manuscript housed at Yale University
Barbary Shore	BS	1951	novel	spent 3 weeks on the bestseller list, achieving no. 3
The Deer Park	DP	1955	novel	spent 15 weeks on the bestseller list, achieving no. 6
The White Negro: Superficial Reflections on the Hipster	WN	1959 (Note: This date is often listed as 1957 or 1958 (e.g. Adams (1974, p. 1) and Lennon (1986, p. 219) list 1957), but as Lennon & Lennon (2018, p. 29) explain, the City Lights publication is followed by the 1958 "Reflections on Hipsterism", so earlier than 1959 is unlikely.)	essay	first published in Dissent 4, Summer 1957
Advertisements for Myself	AFM	1959	miscellany	original working title: The Hip and the Square: a Miscellany
Deaths for the Ladies (and Other Disasters)	DFL	1962	poetry	
The Presidential Papers	PP	1963	miscellany	
An American Dream	AAD	1965	novel	spent 6 weeks on the bestseller list, achieving no. 8
Cannibals and Christians	CAC	1966	miscellany	
The Short Fiction of Norman Mailer	SFNM (Note: Abbreviated SF in Adams (1974, p. 4, passim).)	1967	short story collection	nineteen stories — one new ("The Shortest Novel of Them All") and eighteen previously published with an original introduction; published with material from Existential Errands under the title The Essential Mailer, Sevenoaks, Kent: New English Library, 1982
The Deer Park: A Play		1967	play	
Why Are We in Vietnam?	WWVN (Note: According to Lennon (2008a), sometimes abbreviated as WVN.)	1967	novel	nominated for the National Book Award
The Bullfight: A Photographic Narrative with Text by Norman Mailer		1967	essay	
The Armies of the Night: History as a Novel, the Novel as History	AON	1968	nonfiction narrative	won the Pulitzer Prize for general nonfiction and the National Book Award for arts and letters; ranked nineteenth on a list of the top 100 works of journalism of the twentieth century
The Idol and the Octopus: Political Writings on the Kennedy and Johnson Administrations		1968	miscellany	selections from PP and CAC, including the new "On Lady Chatterley and Tropic of Cancer"
Miami and the Siege of Chicago: An Informal History of the Republican and Democratic Conventions of 1968	MSC	1968	nonfiction narrative	nominated for the National Book Award in history and biography
Of a Fire on the Moon	OFM	1971	nonfiction narrative	nominated for the National Book Award in the sciences category
King of the Hill: Norman Mailer on the Fight of the Century		1971	nonfiction narrative	
Prisoner of Sex	POS	1971	essay	nominated for the National Book Award in the arts and letters category
Maidstone: A Mystery	MM	1971	screenplay	based on the 1968 film that was mostly improvised
The Long Patrol: 25 Years of Writing from the Work of Norman Mailer		1971	collection	edited and introduced by Robert F. Lucid
Existential Errands	EE	1972	miscellany	
St. George and the Godfather	SGG	1972	nonfiction narrative	
Marilyn: A Biography; Pictures by the World's Foremost Photographers	MAR	1973	biography	spent 9 weeks on the bestseller list, achieving no. 6
The Faith of Graffiti	FOG	1974	essay	
The Fight	FIG	1975	nonfiction narrative	
Some Honorable Men: Political Conventions, 1960-1972	SHM	1976	anthology	includes a new preface and four previously published political narratives: "Superman Comes to the Supermarket", "In the Red Light", MSC, and SSG
Genius and Lust: A Journey through the Major Writings of Henry Miller	GAL	1976	essay	
A Transit to Narcissus	TTN	1978	novel	facsimile of typescript of previously unpublished novel written in 1943
The Executioner's Song	ES	1979	nonfiction narrative	spent 25 weeks on the bestseller list, achieving no. 3; won the Playboy Writing Award for fiction in 1979 and the Pulitzer Prize for fiction in 1980; nominated for the American Book Award for fiction and the National Book Critics Circle Award for fiction in 1979; ranked 72 on a list of the top 100 works of journalism of the twentieth century; Mailer insisted on calling ES a "true-life novel"
Of Women and Their Elegance	OWE	1980	novel	photographs by Milton Greene
The Essential Mailer	EM	1982	collection	combines SFNM and EE in a British release
Pieces and Pontifications	PAP	1982	miscellany	Pontifications edited and introduced by J. Michael Lennon
Ancient Evenings	AE	1983	novel	spent 17 weeks on the bestseller list, achieving no. 6
Tough Guys Don't Dance	TGD	1984	novel	spent 10 weeks on the bestseller list, achieving no. 5
Conversations with Norman Mailer	CNM	1988	collection	edited and introduced by J. Michael Lennon; contains 34 previously published interviews, including three self-interviews, an introduction, and chronology of Mailer's life
Harlot's Ghost	HG	1991	novel	spent 4 weeks on the bestseller list, achieving no. 12
Oswald's Tale: An American Mystery	OT	1995	nonfiction narrative	
Portrait of Picasso as a Young Man: An Interpretive Biography	POP	1995	biography	
The Gospel According to the Son	GAS	1997	novel	spent 6 weeks on the bestseller list, achieving no. 7
The Time of Our Time	TOOT (Note: According to Lennon (2008a), sometimes abbreviated as TOT.)	1998	anthology	contains 139 excerpts from 26 of Mailer's books and uncollected periodical pieces; includes "The Shadow of the Crime: A Word from the Author", a one-page reflection on the 1960 stabbing of his second wife Adele; Mailer signed 25,000 copies
The Spooky Art: Thoughts on Writing	SA	2003	miscellany	edited and introduced by J. Michael Lennon; contains previously published and original material
Modest Gifts: Poems and Drawings	MG	2003	poetry	old (some revised) and new poems; reprint of DFL and poems from CAC
Why Are We at War?	WWW	2003	essay	assembled from two interviews and a speech, September 2002 to February 2003, against the Iraq war
Norman Mailer's Letters on An American Dream, 1963-1969	LAD	2004	letters	76 letters about the writing and publication of AAD, edited by J. Michael Lennon
The Big Empty: Dialogues on Politics, Sex, God, Boxing, Morality, Myth, Poker and Bad Conscience in America	BE	2006	conversations	with John Buffalo Mailer
The Castle in the Forest	CIF	2007	novel	spent 3 weeks on the bestseller list, achieving no. 5
On God: An Uncommon Conversation	OG	2007	conversations	with J. Michael Lennon; edited transcripts of ten conversations between Lennon and Mailer, 2003–2006
Mind of an Outlaw: Selected Essays of Norman Mailer	MO	2013	collection	49 important essays, 1948–2006, including "Freud" an unpublished essay from the mid-1950s; edited by Phillip Sipiora
The Selected Letters of Norman Mailer	SLNM	2014	letters	714 letters, 1940 to 2007, selected from the approximately 50,000 Mailer wrote over his lifetime, edited by J. Michael Lennon
Norman Mailer: Four Books of the 1960s		2018	collection	Library of America #305 contains AAD, WVN, AON, and MSC; edited by J. Michael Lennon
Norman Mailer: Collected Essays of the 1960s		2018	collection	Library of America #306; edited by J. Michael Lennon
Lipton's: A Marijuana Journal		2024	journal	A journal written in the winter of 1954–1955, containing an introduction, annotations, an index, and correspondence between Mailer and Robert Lindner; edited by J. Michael Lennon, Gerald R. Lucas, and Susan Mailer

== Novels ==
Title	Year	Publication Information
The Naked and the Dead	1948	New York: Rinehart, 6 May; London: Wingate, 9 May 1949.
Barbary Shore	1951	New York: Rinehart, 24 May; London: Cape, 21 January 1952.
The Deer Park	1955	New York: Putnam's, 14 October; London: Wingate, 1957.
An American Dream	1965	New York: Dial, 15 March. London: Deutsch, 26 April.
Why Are We in Vietnam?	1967	New York: Putnam's, 15 September; London: Weidenfeld and Nicolson, March or April 1969.
A Transit to Narcissus	1978	New York: Howard Fertig, 29 March.
Of Women and Their Elegance	1980	New York: Simon and Schuster, 26 November; London: Hodder and Stoughton.
Ancient Evenings	1983	Boston: Little, Brown, 4 April; London: Macmillan, 26 May.
Tough Guys Don't Dance	1984	New York: Random House, 20 August; London: Michael Joseph, 15 October.
Harlot's Ghost	1991	New York: Random House, 2 October. London: Michael Joseph, October.
The Gospel According to the Son	1997	New York: Random House, 2 May; London: Little, Brown, 18 September.
The Castle in the Forest	2007	New York: Random House, 23 January.

== Non-fiction ==
Title	Year	Publication Information
The White Negro	1959	San Francisco: City Lights Books.
The Armies of the Night	1968	New York: New American Library.
Miami and the Siege of Chicago	1968	New York: New American Library.
Of a Fire on the Moon	1971	Boston: Little, Brown.
King of the Hill	1971	New York: New American Library.
Prisoner of Sex	1971	Boston: Little, Brown.
St. George and the Godfather	1972	New York: New American Library.
The Faith of Graffiti	1974	New York: Praeger.
The Fight	1975	Boston: Little, Brown.
Genius and Lust	1976	New York: Grove.
The Executioner's Song	1979	Boston: Little, Brown.
Oswald's Tale: An American Mystery	1995	New York: Random House.
Why Are We at War?	2003	New York: Random House.
Lipton's: A Marijuana Journal	2024	New York: Arcade.

== Anthologies, collections and miscellanies ==
Beginning in 1959, it became a habit of Mailer's to release his periodical writing, excerpts, and the occasional new piece in collections and miscellanies every few years. Not including letters, Mailer had written for over 100 magazines and periodicals, including Dissent, Ladies Home Journal, One: The Homosexual Magazine, Playboy, Esquire, Vanity Fair, Harper's, New Yorker, and others.

Title	Year	Publication Information
Advertisements for Myself	1959	New York: Putnam, 1959.
The Presidential Papers	1963	New York: Putnam, 1963.
Cannibals and Christians	1966	New York: Dial, 1966.
The Short Fiction of Norman Mailer	1967	New York: Dell, 1967.
The Idol and the Octopus	1968	New York: Dell, 1968.
The Long Patrol: 25 Years of Writing from the Work of Norman Mailer	1971	New York: World, 1971.
Existential Errands	1972	Boston: Little, Brown, 1972.
Some Honorable Men: Political Conventions, 1960-1972	1976	Boston: Little, Brown, 1976.
The Essential Mailer	1982	Sevenoaks, Kent: New English Library, 1982.
Pieces and Pontifications	1982	Boston: Little, Brown, 1982.
The Time of Our Time	1998	New York: Random House, 1998.
The Spooky Art: Thoughts on Writing	2003	New York: Random House, 2003.
Mind of an Outlaw: Selected Essays of Norman Mailer	2013	New York: Random House: 2013.
Norman Mailer: Four Books of the 1960s	2018	New York: Library of America, 2018.
Norman Mailer: Collected Essays of the 1960s	2018	New York: Library of America, 2018.

== Conversations and interviews ==
By 1986, Mailer had been interviewed approximately 200 times, perhaps more than any other American author on a wide range of topics. He may maintain that distinction today.

Title	Year	Publication Information	Notes
Pieces and Pontifications	1982	Boston: Little, Brown, 1982.	contains 20 interviews
Conversations with Norman Mailer	1988	Jackson: University Press of Mississippi.	Edited by J. Michael Lennon.
The Big Empty	2006	New York: Nation Books.	With John Buffalo Mailer.
On God: An Uncommon Conversation	2007	New York: Random House.	With J. Michael Lennon.

== Short stories ==
Title	Written (Note: Most dates come from SFNM. Those that do not are otherwise noted.)	Published	Original Publication	Collected In	Notes
"The Greatest Thing in the World"	1940	1941	Harvard Advocate	Story 19 (1941); Hold Your Breath: Suspense Stories (1947); (Note: Edited by Alfred Hitchcock.) Story: The Fiction of the Forties (1949); AFM (1959); SFNM (1967)	written during Mailer's sophomore year at Harvard; won Story magazine's eighth annual college writing contest
"Right Shoe on Left Foot"	1941	1942	Harvard Advocate	-	never reprinted
"Maybe Next Year"	1941	1942	Harvard Advocate	The Harvard Advocate Anthology (1942); AFM (1959); SFNM (1967)	written in Mailer's junior year at Harvard
"A Calculus at Heaven"	1942 (Oct.)	1944	Cross-Section: A Collection of New American Writing	AFM (1959); SFNM (1967); EM (1982)	written for Robert Hillyer's English A-5 class in Mailer's senior year at Harvard
"The Paper House"	1951–1952 (Winter)	1952	New World Writing: Second Mentor Collection	Lilliput's Extra Holiday Reading (London 1953); AFM (1959); SFNM (1967); A Selection from the Short Fiction of Norman Mailer (1968); EM (1982); Stag (1975)	based on an anecdote by Vance Bourjaily, to whom Mailer dedicated the story
"The Dead Gook"	1951–1952 (Winter)	1952	Discovery, No. 1	AFM (1959); SFNM (1967); A Selection from the Short Fiction of Norman Mailer (1968); EM (1982)	
"The Language of Men"	1951–1952 (Winter)	1953	Esquire	Various Temptations (1955); The Armchair Esquire (1958); AFM (1959); SFNM (1967); A Selection from the Short Fiction of Norman Mailer (1968); EM (1982)	
"Pierrot"	1951	1953	World Review	AFM (1959); SFNM (1967)	published as "The Patron Saint of MacDougal Alley" in AFM and SFNM with changes
"The Notebook"	1951–1952 (Winter)	1953	Cornhill Magazine no. 996	The Berkley Book of Modern Writing, No. 3 (1956); AFM (1959); SFNM (1967); EM (1982)	reprinted in The Mailer Review 12.1 (2018)
"The Man Who Studied Yoga"	1951–1952 (Winter)	1956	New Short Novels 2	AFM (1959); SFNM (1967); EM (1982); TOOT (1998)	
"Advertisements for Myself on the Way Out"	1958	1958	Partisan Review 25	AFM (1959); SFNM (1967); EM (1982)	
"The Time of Her Time"	1958	1959	AFM	SFNM (1967); Writer’s Choice: Each of Twenty American Authors Introduces His Own Best Story (1974); EM (1982); TOOT (1998)	
"It"	1939	1959	AFM	SFNM (1967)	
"Great in the Hay"	1950	1959	AFM	SFNM (1967)	
"Truth and Being: Nothing and Time"	1960 (Dec.)	1962	Evergreen Review no. 26	PP (1963); SFNM (1967); Evergreen Review Reader: A Ten Year Anthology, 1962–1967, Vol. II (1980); EM (1982)	
"The Locust Cry"	1963	1963	Commentary	PP (1963); CAC (1966); SFNM (1967); EM (1982)	
"The Last Night: a Story"	1962	1963	Esquire	CAC (1966); SFNM (1967); EM (1982); The Last Night (1984)	reprinted in The Mailer Review 13.1 (2019) with an introduction by J. Michael Lennon
"The Killer: a Story"	1960	1964	Evergreen Review no. 32	CAC (1966); SFNM (1967); EM (1982)	
"Ministers of Taste: A Story"	1965	1965	Partisan Review no. 32	CAC (1966); SFNM (1967); EM (1982)	
"The Shortest Novel of Them All"	1963	1967	SFNM	-	the only story in SFNM that was not previously published
"The Blood of the Blunt"	1951	2012	The Mailer Review	-	previously unpublished short story, circa 1951
"Love Buds"	1942–43	2013	The Mailer Review	-	previously unpublished short story written in Mailer's senior year in college, 1942–43
"La Petite Bourgeoise"	1951	2014	The Mailer Review	-	previously unpublished short story, circa 1951
"The Thalian Adventure"	1951	2015	The Mailer Review	-	previously unpublished short story, circa 1951
"The Collision"	1933	2016	The Mailer Review	-	Mailer's first complete story, previously unpublished, written January 1933
"Dr. Bulganoff and the Solitary Teste"	1951	2017	The Mailer Review	-	previously unpublished short story, circa 1951
"Trial of the Warlock"	?	1976 (Dec.)	Playboy	-	

== Critical studies of Mailer's work ==
- Leeds, Barry H. (1969). The Structured Vision of Norman Mailer. New York: NYU Press. OCLC 474531468.
- Kaufmann, Donald (1969). Norman Mailer: The Countdown (The First Twenty Years). Carbondale: Southern Illinois University Press. ISBN 9780809303878. OCLC 977535620.
- Lucid, Robert F., ed. (1971). Norman Mailer: The Man and His Work. Boston: Little Brown. OCLC 902036360.
- Braudy, Leo, ed. (1972). Norman Mailer: a Collection of Critical Essays. Twentieth Century Views. Englewood Cliffs, NJ: Prentice Hall. ISBN 9780135455333. OCLC 868765103.
- Poirier, Richard (1972). Norman Mailer. Modern Masters. New York: Viking Press. OCLC 473033417.
- Solotaroff, Robert (1973). Down Mailer's Way. Urbana; London: University of Illinois Press. ISBN 9780252003981. OCLC 644343516.
- Adams, Laura, ed. (1974a). Will the Real Norman Mailer Please Stand Up. Port Washington; London: Kennikat Press. ISBN 9780804690669. OCLC 1050855202.
- Adams (1974).
- Radford, Jean (1975). Norman Mailer: A Critical Study. London; Basingstoke: Macmillan Press. OCLC 463529477.
- Adams, Laura (1977). Existential Battles: the Growth of Norman Mailer. Athens: Ohio UP. OCLC 787841439.
- Bufithis, Philip (1978). Norman Mailer. New York: Frederick Ungar. OCLC 932270728.
- Merrill, Robert (1978). Norman Mailer. New York: Twayne. OCLC 463500243.
- Gordon, Andrew (1980). An American Dreamer: A Psychoanalytic Study of the Fiction of Norman Mailer. London: Fairleigh Dickinson UP. OCLC 1046256795.
- Begiebing, Robert J. (1980). Acts of Regeneration: Allegory and Archetype in the Works of Norman Mailer. Columbia; London: University of Missouri Press. OCLC 466533555.
- Mills, Hilary (1982). Mailer: A Biography. New York: Empire Books. OCLC 966034621.
- Manso, Peter (1985). Mailer: His Life and Times. New York: Washington Square Press. ISBN 9781416562863. OCLC 1035697738.
- Lennon (1986).
- Bloom, Harold, ed. (1986). Norman Mailer. Modern Critical Views. Philadelphia, PA: Chelsea House. ISBN 9780877546566. OCLC 12420979.
- Lennon (1988).
- Begiebing, Robert J. (1989). Toward a New Synthesis: John Fowles, John Gardner, and Norman Mailer. Ann Arbor, MI: UMI. ISBN 9780835719476. OCLC 924803474.
- Nigel, Leigh (1989). Radical Fictions and the Novels of Norman Mailer. Houndmills, Basingstoke, Hampshire: Macmillan. OCLC 68171016.
- Rollyson (1991).
- Merrill, Robert (1992). Norman Mailer Revisited. Boston: Twayne. OCLC 463568236.
- Glenday, Michael K. (1995). Norman Mailer. New York: St. Martins Press. OCLC 878025365.
- Dearborn (1999).
- Dickstein, Morris (2002). Leopards in the Temple: The Transformation of American Fiction, 1945-1970. Cambridge, MA; London: Harvard UP. OCLC 606732230.
- Leeds, Barry H. (2002). The Enduring Vision of Norman Mailer. Bainbridge Island, Wash.: Pleasure Boat Studio. OCLC 845519995.
- Bloom, Harold, ed. (2003). Norman Mailer. Bloom's Modern Critical Views. Philadelphia, PA: Chelsea House. OCLC 263706819.
- Lennon (2013).
- Lennon, J. Michael, ed. (2014). The Selected Letters of Norman Mailer. New York: Random House. OCLC 933749753.
- Wenke, Joseph (2014) [1987]. Mailer's America. Hanover, NH; London: University Press of New England for University of Connecticut. ISBN 978-0874513936.
- Bailey, Jennifer (2014) [1979]. Norman Mailer Quick-Change Artist. New York: Palgrave Macmillan. OCLC 935186576.
- Schultz, Kevin (2016). Buckley and Mailer: the Difficult Friendship that Shaped the Sixties. New York: W.W. Norton. OCLC 921868954.
- Bozung, Justin, ed. (2017). The Cinema of Norman Mailer: Film is Like Death. New York: Bloomsbury Academic. OCLC 1011515088.
- McKinley, Maggie (2017). Understanding Norman Mailer. Columbia, SC: The University of South Carolina Press. OCLC 985080064.
- Lennon & Lennon (2018).
- McKinley, Maggie, ed. (2021). Norman Mailer in Context. Cambridge, UK: Cambridge University Press. ISBN 9781108774413.
- Begiebing, Robert J. (2023). Norman Mailer at 100: Conversations, Correlations, Confrontations. Baton Rogue, LA: Louisiana State University Press.
