= The Man Who Studied Yoga =

Short story by Norman Mailer

- Short story by Norman Mailer
- published by Ballantine Books
- Country: United States
- Language: English
- Genre: Fiction

Publication
- Published in: New Short Novels 2
- Media type: Print (Anthology)
- Publication date: 1956

Chronology
The Thalian Adventure	The Time of Her Time

"The Man Who Studied Yoga", a novella by Norman Mailer written in 1952, was first published in the 1956 collection New Short Novels 2 then later in Mailer's 1959 miscellany Advertisements for Myself (AFM). It is a tale of a "writer manqué", or a writer who fails to write, reflecting some of Mailer's own anxiety in the 1950s as he tries to reinvent himself.

The story's events take place on a Sunday in winter and center around Sam Slovoda, a sort of bourgeois everyman, who senses that his life is dull and even why it's dull, but cannot take the risks necessary to make it better. Sam and his situation seem to reflect what Mailer viewed as the malaise of middle-class America in the 1950s, created and maintained by the language of psychoanalysis and the privileging of the rational mind over lived experience. Mailer saw a new type of totalitarianism threatening America: that of middle-class comfort and conformity. "Yoga" examines the cost of a structured and secure middle-class life on a character who is aware of his mediocrity, but can do nothing to rise above it. "Yoga" is also a story about the creation of art and finding one's voice, perhaps part of Mailer's attempt to exorcise his own literary demons after the success of The Naked and the Dead.

== Background ==
The 1950s was Mailer's toughest decade as a writer. His biographer J. Michael Lennon explains that after his success with The Naked and the Dead, Mailer felt depleted and was not sure what to write about next. He struggled to find his place after the difficulties he had with his subsequent novels, and it seemed that his career was in crisis. By 1956, Mailer wondered whether he really was a writer and was ready to quit. After missing a publishing opportunity with a "lady's magazine", (Note: Lennon explains that Pearl Kazin, an editor at Harper's Bazaar had invited Mailer to write something for the magazine, to which Mailer replied: "I'm still too young and too arrogant to care to write the kind of high-grade horseshit you print in Harper's Bazaar".) Mailer conceived of an eight-novel series based on the dreams of "a small frustrated man". This series would "emanate from the mind" of Sam Slovoda and include Sergius O'Shaugnessy, the roguish protagonist of The Deer Park and "The Time of Her Time", and other characters with shifting names travelling through time and "through many worlds, through pleasure, business, communism, church, working class, crime, homosexuality and mysticism". While Mailer deserted the overly-ambitious eight-novel idea, he wrote the first draft of The Deer Park and the 29-page abandoned prologue to it became "The Man Who Studied Yoga". Mailer credits his sister Barbara, his soon-to-be second wife Adele, Lillian Ross, and Dan Wolf (then editor of The Village Voice) for encouraging him to write it. "Yoga", Mills explains, marks a crucial point for Mailer as a writer.

== Major Themes ==
You can see then that this collection of pieces and parts, of advertisements, short stories, articles, short novels, fragments of novels, poems and part of a play comes to be written, after all, and for the most part, on just such a sweet theme — the shits are killing us, even as they kill themselves — each day a few more lies eat into the seed with which we are born, little institutional lies from the print of newspapers, the shock waves of television, and the sentimental cheats of the movie screen.

— Norman Mailer

"Yoga" takes as its chief concern how the individual's autonomy is undermined by contemporary life. It illustrates the disparity between individual desires and the homogenizing powers of, as Morris Dickstein puts it, a "soft totalitarianism of conformity, McCarthyism, middle-aged timidity, and intellectual compromise". In the period just after the war that supposedly defeated fascism, a new tyranny of peace threatened the ambitions of Americans and led to unsatisfying jobs, a lack of ambition, and sexual frustration. Dickstein continues: The enlightened liberal individual "with its faith in rationality, progress, and bureaucratic forms of organization, had blinded itself to the irrational forces now exposed in the psyche and set loose in the world". Kevin Schultz outlines one of the bulwarks of the Liberal Establishment that Mailer had such an antipathy for: the perfection of American life brought about by a faith in reason, progress, and technology. The mid-century liberals had put their confidence in the "cool workings of the bureaucrats" and eschewed the irrational making life more comfortable, but less pleasurable — what Gordon reads as a "regressive solution, a yearning to retreat into the deathlike security of the womb". This was the birth of what Adamowski calls "the new class": "an intelligentsia that seeks always to explain and control, out of a sensibility flattened by its commitment to technology". Mailer would later write "the shits are killing us"; the "shits" were expressions of totalitarianism that Mailer began to see within liberalism "marked by an instrumentalist rationalism that used the methods of modem technical and managerial success". Here is the beginning of Mailer's lifelong distrust in liberal rationality's faith in science and technology; see, in particular, The Armies of the Night and the liberal support of "technology land" that Mailer calls a psychic drain on the soul of America:

If the republic was now managing to convert the citizenry to a plastic mass, ready to be attached to any manipulative gung ho, the author was ready to cast much of the blame for such success into the undernourished lap, the overpsychologized loins, of the liberal academic intelligentsia. [. . .] Liberal academics had no root of a real war with technology land itself, no, in all likelihood, they were the natural managers of that future air-conditioned vault where the last of human life would still exist.

Mailer, states Adamowski, becomes critical of the inner life of liberalism, prominently in "Yoga". Richard Poirier suggests that Mailer might have even projected his own anxiety into Sam: "In tone, feeling, and even phrasing, Sam is a portrait of what Mailer, in 1952, might have feared for himself". Likewise, Frederick Busch reads the narrator as a figure that expresses Mailer's own anxieties about writing and creating — Sam is a way that Mailer can address these issues and perhaps exorcise them at the same time. Indeed, as Solotaroff notes, "Yoga" represents the type of story that might have secured Mailer's critical reputation had he chosen to focus on more conventional, sympathetic characters in the fifties "instead of trying to create a fictional world of real possibility".

== Synopsis ==
Sam Slovoda and his wife Elenor are a middle-class couple who live in Queens with their two daughters. Sam makes a decent living writing continuity for comic strips, but aspires to write a novel. The story takes place one Sunday in winter, from just before Sam gets up to when he falls asleep. Sam decides to work on his novel, but gets a call from a friend, Marvin Rossman, who has acquired a pornographic film and wants to use Sam's projector. Sam invites Marvin, his wife Louise, and another couple—Alan and Roslyn Sperber—over to watch the film. After some anxious talk and an anticlimactic story about Alan's college friend Cassius O'Shaugnessy, they watch the film, and too embarrassed to talk about it right away, they watch it again before discussing it: "As intelligent people they must dominate it". After a bit of socializing, the other two couples leave, and Sam keeps the film a while longer. Sam and Elenor have sex while watching the film again, then go to bed. Elenor falls right to sleep, but Sam has difficulty at first, thinking about the wasted day and his failed potential as a writer and a man.

While the story is straightforward, the inner life of the characters—especially Sam—is conflicted. Sam, the narrator states, is like most of us: "he is full of envy, full of spite, a gossip, a man who is pleased to find others are as unhappy as he, and yet—this is the worst to be said—he is a decent man. He is better than most" and "has one serious virtue: he is not fond of himself—he wants to be better". Sam, who "just turned forty", is in therapy with Dr. Sergius whose presence is heard throughout the story as a judgmental voice in Sam's head. Sam speaks in the language of psychoanalysis to his wife and friends, usually saying the direct opposite of what he is feeling. His wife and friends are equally pretentious and miserable, and the impression throughout the novella is that they do and say what they think they should rather than what they want to do, making them full of regrets, bitterness, and self-loathing. Finally, Sam is a radical "out of habit, but without enthusiasm and without a cause" for the Communist Party; he and Marvin "are wary of politics today" and only discuss what should be done, rather than participating in the process.

== Style ==
Sam states one of the reasons that he cannot write his novel is because he cannot find a form: "He does not want to write a realistic novel, because reality is no longer realistic". He adds: "Modern life is schizoid". Not only is this observation a thematic concern in the novella, but it also comments on the story's style and became an on-going concern for Mailer after The Naked and the Dead — which may be his only realistic novel. "Yoga" is Mailer's attempt to find a subjective voice that was a better reflection of the time and anticipates Mailer's narrative voice in future writing.

The narratorial voice is first-person, omniscient—a point-of-view that Mailer used only two other times in his fiction, in "Advertisements for Myself on the Way Out" and The Castle in the Forest. The tone is sombre and resigned, like a heavy, immovable weight is on each of the character's chests. While he remains unnamed, the narrator seems to be a close acquaintance of Sam's and has access to his and the other characters' minds — a sort of overarching intelligence that is privy to and comments on all of their innermost thoughts. Oddly, the narrator seems simultaneously a detached observer and an intimate participant, most of the time assessing the characters' inner life, but sometimes inserting himself into the narrative — calling attention to himself by using the first-person "I". Yet, while the narrator does have access to the other characters' minds, his attention is centered on Sam Slovoda. Frederick Busch asserts that Mailer has created a voice that speaks about Sam, and it might also represent Mailer in some ways. The problem, states Busch, is Mailer wants to speak about his own difficulties writing, but needs to objectify his voice in order to create fiction and not autobiography. Thus, he not only analyzes the characters' feelings, but also his own. The narrator, then, becomes Sam's alter ego and "someone who can be present and yet not be present, a new voice for saying fiction, a new way of being intimately involved as writer while being objectively aloof-like a third-person omniscient voice". Philip Bufithis suggests that Mailer employs this strategy to focus on this singular sensibility: "a self-conscious, second-rate man who knows and admires what distinction is but cannot attain it".

Mailer writes that "Yoga" was originally to be the prologue of a larger, eight-part work featuring "the adventures of a mythical hero, Sergius O'Shaugnessy, who would travel through many worlds" and have "many of the characters reappear in different books, but with their ages altered". While he abandoned this project, "Yoga" appears as he originally wrote it: "not entirely functional (certain excursions and diversions remaining as part of the abandoned architecture of the large work)". This point connects the novella with The Deer Park and "The Time of Her Time" through Sergius, who, Gordon suggests, could be the narrator of "Yoga". He is the protagonist of the latter two works, and his name echoes through "Yoga": Sam's therapist is Dr. Sergius, Alan tells the story of Cassius O'Shaugnessy, and a Jerry O'Shaugnessy is a friend of Sam and Marvin's — all are "multivalent versions" of Sergius O'Shaugnessy. Frankie Idell, the man in the pornographic film, also echoes Charles Francis Eitel the protagonist of The Deer Park. In addition, Lennon notes that "Yoga" appears in the epigraph of The Deer Park.

== Analysis ==
In her biography of Mailer, Hilary Mills sums up the central conflict of "Yoga": it's a "poignant depiction of the Slavodas and their civic-minded friends, locked in conformity and resorting to Freudian psychology for their answers when they truly ache for sexual satisfaction". Sam Slovoda is a product and practitioner of the Liberal Establishment that Mailer saw as numbing American life — what Gordon calls "the anguished response of an artist to the oppressive historical realities of the 1950s in America". Sam is the epitome of the "spiritual failure" of the 1950s. Sam is the protagonist, suggests Carl Rollyson, because he understands more than those around him how he is flawed and inauthentic. Mailer must show the portrait of failure in order to motivate his readers to action. Indeed, states Bufithis, "Yoga" seems to be a call to action to those who are like Sam to take action and change, or be forever relegated to a life of quiet desperation. Gordon argues that "Yoga" is replete with images of constipation, thwarted powers, helpless rage, and "an overwhelming sense of being stifled, suffocated, and strangled". Sam, Gordon explains, is like an overprotected child who is "smothered in mother-love" and caught between his wife Eleanor and his analyst Dr. Sergius. The narrator criticizes Sam throughout, showing him talking a good game, but always opting to remain passive: "without the courage to live, to defy—especially to defy his smug psychoanalyst—Sam will never quite be a man". He sees himself as a rebel and wants desperately to be a man, but he is incapable of manly aggression or courage; this, for Mailer, is a cardinal sin: courage and risk-taking are key to psychic growth. "Yoga" is a portrait of American ambivalence and bad faith.

Similarly, Philip H. Bufithis argues that the main conflict in "Yoga" lies in the distinction between thought and action: "reflection upon experience is antipodal to its enjoyment". Sam allows his cognitive life—symbolized by his relationship to Dr. Sergius—to take dominance over his ability or even willingness to act, unlike Cassius, whom Miller calls the "moral center" of the novella. Cassius O'Shaugnessy, Alan's college friend and the actual man who studied yoga, is a sort of most-interesting-man type that seems to be the quintessence of individuality in the novella. A world traveller, Cassius samples all that life has to offer and provides a contrast to Sam, who does not take risks and lives a comfortable life of middle-class security. Bufithis explains that Cassius' life is a critical commentary on the Slovodas and their friends who prejudge and try to rationally control experience—contrasting thought with action. O'Shaugnessy is the romantic that seized the day and took control of his own life and destiny, and he, like a hero, has become a topic of conversation for the meek souls on Sunday afternoon. Marvin calls Cassius a "psychopath", presaging Mailer's Hipster in "The White Negro", and explicitly illustrating how Sam and his friends are polar opposites: law-abiding and rational, but lifeless. Cassius' story, then, only validates Sam's notion that his world-view is correct.

Castronovo compares Sam to Joyce's Gabriel Conroy in "The Dead": he has unrealized literary ambitions; he is petty, spiteful, and envious; he wants to be closer to his wife, but is haunted by a ghost from the past; he takes a frank assessment of himself and realizes he is a middle-aged man, unheroic and unremarkable, and "spiritually impotent". Continuing along these lines, Castronovo argues that "Yoga" serves as a stage in the development of the writer in the 50s—"the artist as tough guy"—particularly apropos to Mailer as one "who has to move out of his accustomed mode" and try something new: "Mailer was probably the first major figure in our national letters to realize that writers could no longer be writers in that old, rocked-ribbed, self-confident sense". The new phase of a Sam Slovoda is, for Mailer, a Hipster—one prepared for risk, violence, opportunity, and pleasure.

In his advertisement for "The Man Who Studied Yoga", Mailer states that it had originally been conceived as a novel that is "a descendent of Moby Dick", (Note: Mailer did not italicize "Moby Dick" in the original.) and taking that cue, Frederick Busch argues that it has a direct connection. Busch suggests that both writers were divided about truths as they saw them and the current state of their respective times: he continues that the works and narrators reflect these divisions, relaying autobiographical anxieties at the same time they are creating art. Both try to bridge their own inner conflicts with the fictive worlds while also keeping them separate. Both narrators reflect the "doubts and needs" of their respective authors, while inventing their own characters to dramatize their anxieties. Similar to Mailer's Sergius O'Shaugnessy in The Deer Park, both narrators "invent darker characters to speak for" them right "before our eyes". Gordon suggests that the narrator acts as a "curative, as therapist for both the tale and its hero" — a commentator on what Sam cannot come to terms with. Likewise, Poirier adds that Mailer's voice "took its form from a species of debate or dialogue or 'war' among the possible and competing voices that were alive within him" and is also reflected throughout AFM. These alter egos, argues Busch, appear again in Mailer's later work, like Why Are We in Vietnam? and An American Dream.

Enid Stubin calls Sam and Elenor Slovoda "figures in a cautionary tale of contemporary courtship". Their relationship is characterized by inertia: they seem to be together only because it would require more effort to part. In Diana Trilling's reading, they "ache with the sexual longings that are never to be satisfied, and with the frustration of their dreams of themselves". In short, Mailer shows that in order to conform to society without violating its established norms "is purposeless death". Adamowski states that Mailer regarded the Cold-War liberal American as sexually unhealthy—who had sex too much with their heads filtered through psychoanalysis, pornography, and rational theories from therapy and the academy. They disagree about the most trivial things, and when they have sex, it's seems like a gross parody of the pornographic film: "false artist imitating false art in a story about artistic failure". The comparison is overt, as the victim's name in the film is also Elenor. Later, Sam recalls Elenor's friend in a mental institution, alluding to the crazy Pip in Moby-Dick and back to Cassius the "psychopath": perhaps these are characters who have penetrated that veneer of conformity and can speak the truth. In 1957, Mailer will go on to develop his "philosophical psychopath" in his figuration of the Hipster in "The White Negro".

== Publication ==
This novella was first published in New Short Novels 2, 1956. It was later reprinted in Advertisements for Myself in 1959 (with a revised and expanded preface), The Short Fiction of Norman Mailer in 1967, The Essential Mailer in 1982, and The Time of Our Time in 1998. "Yoga" has appeared in the Norton Anthology of American Literature as recently as 1979.

== Reception ==
Diana Trilling calls "Yoga" "one of the best stories of our time and aesthetically Mailer's best-integrated piece of fiction"; Bufithis and Miller label it "masterful", and Solotaroff calls it a "superb work of fiction". Macdonald places "Yoga" alongside "The Time of Her Time", the first half of Barbary Shore, and Armies of the Night as Mailer's best work. Castronovo asserts that "Yoga", along with "The White Negro", are the most valuable parts of Advertisements for Myself. In his commentary on AFM, Robert Merrill calls "Yoga" an excellent piece in a collection otherwise written for Mailer fans. Adamowski labels Mailer's critique of liberalism "nasty", but explains its significant impact on the counter-cultures of the sixties. Morris Dickstein credits Mailer, along with other New York novelists and intellectuals, of defining the zeitgeist after World War II and casting "a long shadow over the second half of the twentieth century".

== See also ==
- The Deer Park
- Advertisements for Myself
- "The White Negro"
- "The Time of Her Time"
