= The Short Fiction of Norman Mailer =

Book by Norman Mailer

- 1967 Paperback Edition
- Author: Norman Mailer
- Language: English
- Genre: Fiction
- Published: 1967
- Publisher: Dell Pub. Co; First Dell Printing edition
- Publication place: United States of America
- Pages: 285
- ISBN: 978-0523480091
- OCLC: 961934

The Short Fiction of Norman Mailer is a 1967 anthology of short stories by Norman Mailer. It is grouped into eight thematic sections and contains nineteen stories, many appearing in one of Mailer's miscellanies; thirteen were published in periodicals or other anthologies before appearing in this collection. The collection was reprinted in hardcover in 1980 and some of the stories were reprinted in other volumes.

The collection ranges from stories that are only a couple of sentences, like "It", to longer novellas, like "A Calculus at Heaven". All included texts represent Mailer's early career, from his first published short story in 1941 while an undergraduate at Harvard to experimental stories from the mid-sixties. The tales range in content from war to urban life to science fiction, each managing to address the conflict between the individual and the social demands that echo throughout Mailer's oeuvre. Styles differ between stories, ranging from his early narrative approach of The Naked and the Dead to the more mature form found in Advertisements for Myself. The Short Fiction of Norman Mailer illustrates Mailer's early development as an influential voice in 20th-century American letters.

== Background ==
A prevalent theme throughout Mailer's stories is the individual's struggle against forces that seek homogeneity and conformity. Gabriel Miller states that "Mailer's early fiction clearly warns that modern man is in danger of losing his dignity, his freedom, and his sense of self before the enormous power of politics and society". Reflecting a recurring theme in Mailer's work, "repetition kills the soul", Mailer's short fiction illustrates the attempts to keep the individual spirit alive against the twentieth-century forces of consumerism, technology, and totalitarianism. Often, Mailer sees psychoanalysis as a negative social force that dulls the senses and the psyche, as Andrew Gordon observes: "Mailer has used psychoanalysis in a very conscious and sophisticated way in his fiction. He also has carried on a crusade, both in his essays and his fiction, against the power of psychoanalysis in popular culture." In many ways, Mailer's early short fiction represents his quest to find a voice "compatible with his recurrent themes and emerging vision."

== Introduction ==
In his introduction, Mailer details his conflicted attitude toward the short story and casts doubt on his own abilities to write a good one. This claim, however, might just be a way for Mailer to mitigate any negative criticism and show modesty by denying his abilities, or as a ruse to get us to discover for ourselves whether Mailer can write a good short story. Yet, Mailer had a general dislike for short stories, and tended to write them when the more serious occupation of writing novels was not going well, or when he had doubts that he was ever meant to be a writer. In fact, Mailer states, that his own short fiction is "neither splendid, unforgettable, nor distinguished" and implies that he is more a "novelist, philosopher, essayist, journalist, personality, cathartic, spark, or demiurge". J. Michael Lennon states that Mailer had an idea that if he was not able to finish a story in a day or two, it was never meant to be written. While it's true that Mailer's reputation as a novelist and a practitioner of new journalism are his chief claims to fame, Eric Heyne suggests that, contrary to Mailer's perhaps disingenuous claims, his short fiction is important, as it demonstrates a distinct arc in his development as a writer from his early work to his more mature style, and shows its literary and historical importance in the transition from modernism to postmodernism.

== The Disappearance of the Ego ==
Part one consists of two short stories written in 1960.

=== The Killer: A Story ===
First published in Evergreen Review in 1964, "The Killer: A Story" is a first-person account of a male prisoner's parole hearing. The prisoner's thoughts consider his moral character and perspectives on life, like what qualities one needs to be viewed favorably: "Good to be slim, trim, shipshape, built the way I am, provided you are modest". He focuses on the negative parts of being on parole; however, he is happy to be out of prison because he has to be a repetitive drone in order to remain unnoticed.

=== Truth and Being: Nothing and Time ===
Subtitled "A Broken Fragment from a Long Novel", "Truth and Being: Nothing and Time" first appeared in Evergreen Review 26, 1962. Mailer wrote it after being released from Bellevue for the stabbing of his wife Adele. In "Truth", Mailer writes a fictitious, first-person account about having cancer, or as he describes the story: "an odd, even exceptional, essay about: shit. Literally". This short story is an extended metaphor and reminiscent of Borges about a "rebellion of the cells". Lennon explains that this story is best understood in the context of Mailer's Manichean view of the cosmos: feces is one of the battlegrounds in the fight between good and evil. (Note: Lennon continues this discussion in relation to Ancient Evenings.)

== The Air of the Dying ==
The second part consists of two short stories.

=== A Calculus at Heaven ===
Mailer wrote Calculus during his senior year at Harvard for Robert Hillyer's English A-5 when he was 20-years-old. It was originally published in 1944 in Cross-Section: A Collection of New American Writing, his first publication in a book. In the style of Dos Passos, A Calculus at Heaven is a third-person novella that Mailer said "is not of the first quality", but makes "an interesting contrast to The Naked and the Dead," his first novel about World War II. What he meant, explains Merrill, is that this version of combat is informed only by popular culture—by what he deems "the liberal mentality"—that can only guess and has not experienced. Even though he had yet to be drafted, Mailer was keen to engage the war in his writing, (Note: See Mailer (1959, pp. 27–28), and his discussion about the "nervous system of every American alive" during World War II.) especially since he had been reading Malraux and Hemingway. Like NAD, it is set in the Pacific Theater during World War II, and shares its "hovering, brooding, sympathetic narrative consciousness". Inspired by the drawn-out battle for Guadalcanal in the Solomon Islands, its mood is somber.

Five American soldiers who are heavily outnumbered by the enemy have direct and strict orders to maintain complete control of the nearby coastal road at all costs. Surrounded by the Japanese on the fictional island of Trinde, the soldiers contemplate their seemingly inevitable demise. Its ending seems inspired by Hemingway. As they smoke what might be their last cigarettes, the captain notices that it will be a sunny day. "Yes," someone answers, "sometimes you want to look pretty carefully at it".

=== Advertisements for Myself on the Way Out ===
Subtitled "Prologue to a Long Novel", this story was originally published in Partisan Review 25, fall 1958, and is told from the perspective of Marion Faye, the protagonist of Mailer's novel The Deer Park, in Provincetown, MA. J. Michael Lennon states that this story "emphasizes the perilous, confused, or mutable condition of its teller". The protagonist, like many of Mailer's narrators, sees himself as disembodied: a "ghost, geist, demiurge, dog, bud, flower, tree, house, or some lost way-station of the divine", that Lennon sees as an attempt, God-like, to figure out or create his destiny.

== Poor Kids ==
The third part consists of two short stories.

=== The Greatest Thing in the World ===
Written during his sophomore year at Harvard, "The Greatest Thing in the World" was Mailer's first publication. It appeared in the Harvard Advocate in 1941. In a 1944 letter, Mailer confessed the story was inspired by a real-life "hitch-hiking tour which [he] embarked on quite Byronically, and in retrospect, masochistically". It contains strong characterizations, a fast-paced plot, and a tension through the protagonist's tempting of fate. It won Story magazine's eighth annual college contest in the same year, which Mailer later stated was the "first powerful and happy event of my career" and gave him the certainty that he was "meant to be a writer". In a 1964 interview, Mailer said this honor "fortified him," leading to his writing No Percentage in two months: "It was just terrible. But I never questioned any longer whether I was started as a writer". In a 1948 interview, Mailer opined that "Thing" would "probably make a wonderful movie someday", and later said "it reads like the early work of a young man who is going to make a fortune writing first-rate action, western, gangster, and suspense pictures".

This Depression-era story begins with Al Groot bargaining for coffee and a doughnut. He reminisces about having more money then hitches a ride with three strangers. He lies to them and says he has more money than he actually has. After gambling on a pool game and winning, Groot angers the other men when he insists on quitting. The men beat him up, threaten him, and drive off with him in the car. He escapes by jumping out of the car. In this naturalistic world, Mailer depicts the occasional sensual victory as all that individuals can hope for. The "greatest thing in the world", then, is the individual's little win in the face of ostensibly mightier forces.

=== Maybe Next Year ===
"Maybe Next Year" was written at Harvard for Theodore Morrison's English A-3 and published in Harvard Advocate in 1942. It depicts young boy's observations of his contentious parents. Mailer wrote this story during his junior year and combines his reading of Faulkner and his feelings about family and childhood in a coming-of-age story in which the young boy must prove his masculinity in a world dominated by his mother's oppression. "Maybe Next Year" might begin Mailer's life-long obsession with dirt and anal imagery in a quest to "dirty himself in freedom". Ultimately, states Rollyson, it's about longing for power and control.

The narrator continuously runs away from his nagging and domineering mother and defeated father by retreating into the nearby woods where he encounters hoboes on the railroad. Due to the statements made by his mother, "They're filthy old things, you'll get sick and die, they're diseased, they're diseased", the boy insults and stones an injured tramp. The boy feels satisfied and grown-up seeing two men cry. In the story's reprint in Advertisements for Myself, Mailer states that its "prose is Salinger-ish, but the inspiration was by Faulkner".

== Sobrieties, Impieties ==
The fourth part consists of five short stories about World War II, written 1951–53. While "The Notebook" and "MacDougal Alley" are not war stories, they were written about the same time, so are included in this section.

=== The Paper House ===
"The Paper House" was first published in New World Writing: Second Mentor Collection in 1952 and is based on an anecdote told to Mailer by Vance Bourjaily. The story is set in occupied Japan in 1951, and Hayes and Nicholson are American Army men stationed there. Nicholson is the narrator and plays second fiddle to Hayes, who has misogynistic and violent tendencies. The two frequent a geisha house where they meet Yuriko and Mimiko. Hayes becomes a regular of Yuriko's, but ends up hitting her one night after having too much to drink. Yuriko then tells Hayes that she will commit hari-kari because of her dishonor. Hayes and Nicholson return to the geisha house to stop her, but it was all a ruse to get back at Hayes for his mistreatment.

=== The Notebook ===
Originally written, according to Mailer, in "an hour," "The Notebook" was first published in Cornhill Magazine in 1953. According to his biographer, Mailer turned a real-life situation with Adele Morales, his second wife, into this story and underlines a credo for Mailer: "a promise never to hide his motives from himself, no matter how ignoble". Set in 1951, it concerns an unnamed writer and his unhappy girlfriend. Much of the story shows the writer's inner monologue about his creative process, and his compulsory need to record everything in his notebook. The girlfriend complains that he is an observer and not a participant in her life, making him question his intentions and his love for her. He decides he loves her and hides his notebook.

=== The Language of Men ===
Based on Mailer's experience as an army cook, "The Language of Men" was first published in Esquire in April 1953 – the first of over 40 for Esquire – and is Mailer's most autobiographical story. Mailer states: "I didn't think of all the specific things then. I just thought of it as a lousy job. But then I started to write the story, and a lot came back that I'd forgotten; and the experience of being an Army cook was a lot more real for me while I was writing than when it had happened". Like Mailer, the protagonist Sanford Carter is given the job of a cook in occupied Japan after the end of World War II — a job neither the writer or his character liked. Carter attempts to make improvements, but he becomes resentful when the men do not seem to appreciate his efforts. The same may have been true for Mailer.

=== The Patron Saint of MacDougal Alley ===
Originally titled "Pierrot" and published in World Review (1953), Mailer made small revisions and changed the name to "The Patron Saint of MacDougal Alley" before republishing it in AFM and SFNM. In "The Patron Saint of MacDougal Alley," Mailer describes a man's interactions with a man named Pierrot. The story follows Pierrot as he constantly moves between multiple places; however, he cannot seem to find a home.

=== The Dead Gook ===
First published in Discovery, No. 1 in December 1952, is about a jungle patrol in the Philippines and based on Mailer's experience with the Filipino Huks, communist partisans, in Luzon and a memorable patrol to find and destroy some Japanese marines. This experience also influenced the naturalism of NAD. The story focuses on Private Brody and Sergeant Lucas. The regiment is approached by a group of Filipino men that claim to have heard gunfire nearby and think there is an American or resistance fighter involved. Brody starts to wonder if anyone will cry for him if he dies. The regiment finds a dead resistance fighter and returns his body to the village to be buried. The story ends with Brody crying for the dead resistance fighter.

== Dark to Dawn, Dawn to Dark ==
The fifth part consists of two short stories.

=== Great in the Hay ===
Dated 1951, "Great in the Hay" is a two-page short story that reads like a fairy tale, complete with a moral: "People who live in the dark live longest of all". Al and Bert live similar lives: they look the same, they both produce films, and they are both married. However, Al is known for being "good in the hay" while Bert is known for only caring about money. Bert obsesses about this difference and hires a private investigator to try to find out Al's secret. Bert finds out the reasons why women love Al, but remains unsatisfied. Al later kills himself because he is depressed, increasing Bert's confusion.

=== The Last Night: A Story ===
Originally published in Esquire in December 1963, Mailer later worked this story into an unpublished screenplay with wife Norris Church Mailer about a Noah's Ark spaceship. It was the last short story Mailer would write, and in 1984, he released a limited edition of the story. "The Last Night: A Story" is a science fiction tale about the end of the world. A plan to create a civilization on Mars fails because more radiation is found there. After it is discovered that the whole Solar System is poisoned by radiation, the only option left is to blow up the Earth and use the force from the explosion to propel a rocket with one hundred people and animals to another galaxy. The treatment ends with the rocket propelling toward the stars and out of the Solar System. Victor Peppard praises "The Last Night: A Story" as a story that gives new nuance to science fiction: "Mailer is able to embody his polemic with modern science in an artistic form grounded in a number of rich literary antecedents and traditions, which ultimately take science fiction to a higher place".

== Microbes ==
The sixth part consists of two experimental short stories.

=== It ===
First published in AFM and the shortest story in the collection, "It" is four sentences and thirty-six words long. It's the first-person account of a soldier's own decapitation.

=== The Shortest Novel of them All ===
The only new story in for SFNM, "The Shortest Novel of Them All" is a twelve-sentence, romantic tragedy that follows a couple through courtship and marriage.

== Mutants ==
The seventh part consists of two short stories.

=== Ministers of Taste: A Story ===
"Ministers of Taste: A Story" features two real letters written to Robert B. Silvers, editor of the New York Review of Books, that appeared in Partisan Review. Neither letter can be located in the original source, but both are reprinted in Mailer's Selected Letters.

The first letter was written on February 22, 1965. Both letters feature Mailer detailing his disappointment in his working relationship with Silvers after he fails to submit two of Mailer's novels to the NYRB despite Mailer's numerous favors for him. In the second letter written on April 4, 1965, Mailer gives Silvers an ultimatum: publish the novels or lose him as a client. Despite the discontent, the second letter ends with Mailer referring to Silvers as his devoted friend.

=== The Locust Cry ===
Originally published in February 1963 in Mailer's bi-monthly column in Commentary, "The Locust Cry" is actually two short stories, "The Test" and "Upsetting the Bowl," that are commentaries on Martin Buber's Tales of the Hasidim.

==== The Test ====
Prince Adam Czartoryski has been married for many years. However, he and his princess cannot conceive a child. Prince Adam travels to the maggid of Koznitz and asks to be prayed for. Soon after, the prince and his princess are fortunate enough to conceive a son. The prince tells his brother about his blessing, but his brother thinks it is a joke. The two travel to the maggid of Koznit so that the brother can get prayer for his ill son. They are told to leave by the maggid and the son dies before they make it home.

==== Upsetting the Bowl ====
Rabbi Elimelekh raises and pours a bowl of soup among the table as he and his disciples sit around the table. This causes one of the disciples to get upset. The Rabbi tells the disciple to not be afraid. The whole Jew country becomes edict. The consciousness of the man in this story is portrayed as an evil atheist who performs ungodly activities. The man worries and has to do the same thing each day. If one thing goes wrong, so does the rest of the day. Then one day it becomes clear and the man becomes grateful and a believer in God.

== Clues to Love ==
The eighth part consists of two short stories, probably Mailer's finest and most well-known.

=== The Time of Her Time ===
In "The Time of Her Time", Sergius O'Shaugnessy, a Village playboy, struggles to satisfy Denise Gondelman. Mailer intended "Time" to be a part of a long novel, but published it instead as a short story in AFM in 1959.

Before publication, Mailer wrote to Dwight Macdonald and thirteen other critics to solicit support for publication in order to avoid potential legal trouble. After the US publication, Mailer writes André Deutsch, his publisher in England, to argue the merits of "Time" and why it should be published. Originally, a censored version was published in England, but the full text was printed in a subsequent 1968 edition.

Enid Stubin describes "The Time of Her Time" as a satire that depicts the realities of human relationships: "The sly and affectionate substance of this 'notorious' story places 'The Time of Her Time' well ahead of its time as a satirical meditation on the roles of men and women in and out of love". Andrew Gordon considers "Time" as a forerunner to An American Dream: the two works share subject matter and setting, so "'Time' can be considered a test run for Dream", though more ironic and self-mocking and, therefore, more "acceptable". Critics like Raines and Heyne see the relationship between Sergius and Denise as a battle, both suggesting that while Denise is empowered — now "a real killer" — and moves on at the end, Sergius is left defeated and emasculated.

Mailer has been criticized for "tired stereotypes" of women, Jews, and blacks in "The Time of Her Time", and it remains a controversial short story, but one of his best. (Note: See Lennon 2014: Mailer's letter to Knox, Macdonald, and Deutsch noted above.) In 1979, Mailer chose "Time" as his best short story; he writes in his preface that choosing this story was easy because his "credentials as a writer of short stories are, say the word, compact".

=== The Man Who Studied Yoga ===
This novella was originally published in New Short Novels 2, 1956, which Mailer originally intended to be the first of a series of eight novels. In Mailer's original conception, "Yoga" was to be the prologue to an eight-novel series. Sam aspires to write a novel, but makes his living writing continuity for comic strips. He is not a heroic figure, but one that struggles with daily life and truly wants to improve. Sam, states Heyne, despises his bourgeois life, but surrenders to it, perhaps making him the object of Mailer's derision.

"The Man Who Studied Yoga" is perhaps Mailer's sole excursion into middle-class normalcy: Sam and Eleanor seem to have a successful, if somewhat boring, suburban life, but it is soon interrupted by watching a pornographic movie with friends. Overstimulated by the movie, Sam dreams of Louis XV's garden of virgins called the Deer Park which becomes the title of Mailer's third novel about Hollywood. In fact, Mailer writes in his journal that finishing "Yoga" gave him the necessary drive and confidence to write The Deer Park.

The narrator is first-person, omniscient: "I would introduce myself if it were not useless. The name I had last night will not be the same as the name I have tonight". This might be a conscious echo of the opening of Melville's Moby-Dick: "Call me Ishmael", or perhaps a contemporary bathos. The title of the novella alludes to an old joke, also alluding to Moby-Dick. One of Sam's friends tells a shaggy dog story of a man who goes to India to study yoga, echoing Pip's passing mention of a joke in Melville's novel: he unscrews his navel, thinking he is on the verge of a revelation, and his ass falls off. This instance seems to suggest Sam's reluctance or inability to take risks or do anything to break the monotony of his routine life. His navel gazing is what makes him the object of Mailer's scorn and drains his life of significance.

The film inspires a dread in the couple who realize that they, in Trilling's reading, "ache with the sexual longings that are never to be satisfied, and with the frustration of their dreams of themselves." In short, Mailer shows that in order to conform to society without violating its established norms "is purposeless death." Sam turns to psychoanalysis for assistance, but Mailer's satiric language makes it clear that he aligns this practice with conformity and its efficacy remains suspect. The novella ends in what is perhaps another echo of Melville — this time Bartleby:

So Sam enters the universe of sleep, a man who seeks to live in such a way as to avoid pain, and succeeds merely in avoiding pleasure. What a dreary compromise is our life!

Diana Trilling calls "The Man Who Studied Yoga" "one of the best stories of our time and aesthetically Mailer's best-integrated piece of fiction".

== See also ==
- Mailer's Short Stories Bibliography
- Advertisements for Myself
- "The White Negro"
- The Time of Our Time
