= The Time of Her Time =

- Short story by Norman Mailer
- Country: United States
- Language: English
- Genre: Fiction

Publication
- Published in: Advertisements for Myself
- Media type: Print (Miscellany)
- Publication date: November 1959

"The Time of Her Time" is a 1959 short story written by Norman Mailer, first appearing in his miscellany Advertisements for Myself. The story depicts macho Irish Catholic bullfighting instructor Sergius O'Shaugnessy and his sexual conquest of a young, middle-class Jewish college girl, Denise Gondelman. The short story was adapted to film in 2000 by Francis Delia. On multiple occasions, Mailer has touted "The Time of Her Time" as "the godfather of Lolita."

== Background ==
In a 1958 letter to Mickey Knox, Mailer describes "Time" as part of a novel-in-progress: "it's interesting I believe, real blow by blow stuff, not hot, but direct enough in its details to be considered pornographic." In light of this fact, Mailer wrote to Dwight Macdonald, and thirteen other critics, to solicit support for publication in order to avoid prosecution for obscenity. Mailer's 1961 letter to André Deutsch, his publisher in England, continues to argue the merits of "Time" and why it should be published, making it "clear that he was less and less able to bridle his irrationality" about this matter. In an untitled postscript to "Time" in the British version of Advertisements, Mailer notes that the second part of "Time" was omitted because it "is the considered opinion of some of the best legal and literary names of the Realm" that its inclusion would have held up publication of the volume. The full text was printed in a subsequent 1968 edition in England.

== Publication ==
"The Time of Her Time" was first published in 1959 in the collection, Advertisements for Myself, then later in The Short Fiction of Norman Mailer. Mailer said that his publisher, Walter Minton of G. P. Putnam's Sons publishing, was brave for publishing the short story, despite its status as "a salacious object in its time". When Minton published it, "a great many of us, not only writers, but critics as well, novelists collaborated to a degree, in the sense that we were fighting the Philistines who wanted to hold literature back". The story collection, Advertisements for Myself, was published without any censorship, though "The Time of Her Time" was absent from the English publication. Mailer has maintained that "The Time of Her Time" has acted as the godfather of Lolita. "Later, Minton used to love to say one of the reasons he published Lolita was he saw he could get away with it... he realized that for all the brouhaha over the dangers of publishing 'The Time of Her Time,' nothing had happened".

== Summary ==
The story — set in what could be inspired by the airy Lower East Side loft Mailer rented during a career downturn in the early 1950s — follows Sergius O'Shaugnessy after he has adjusted to life in Greenwich Village and his sexual exploration and conquests there. O'Shaugnessy, having recently departed from Mexico and his career as an amateur bullfighter, sets up a bullfighting school in his flat, perhaps Mailer's mischievous nod to Hemingway. Rumor of his sexual prowess and stamina spreads quickly through the Village until he is "scoring three and four times a week, literally combing the pussy out of my hair." Sergius, the "messiah of the one-night stand," then meets a collegiate New York girl, Denise Gondelman, Jewish and middle-class. The first night together, they "made love like two club fighters in an open exchange." Sergius is unable to produce an orgasm in Denise; she confides that she has never orgasmed, and Sergius takes this as a challenge to his masculinity. The pair begin an affair – for Denise has been dating a passive Jewish college mate, Arthur, all the while. On the third night, Denise arrives at O'Shaugnessy's place after, she reveals, having spent the evening with Arthur. O'Shaugnessy finds himself lacking on their first try, but he quickly rallies and, by sodomizing her and calling her "a dirty little Jew," produces her orgasm. The morning after, Denise, upset by Sergius' violation of her, tells him, "... your whole life is a lie, and you do nothing but run away from the homosexual that is you," and leaves before Sergius can respond that "she was a hero fit for [him]."

== Style ==
"Time" is a first-person narrative told from the point of view of Sergius O'Shaugnessy.

Mailer's style in "Time" is a bit of a departure for him. He continues his penchant for the long sentence — developed in Barbary Shore and perfected in later pieces like An American Dream and The Prisoner of Sex — but rather than experimental and ponderous, it's witty and more playful, perhaps reflecting the bravado of its narrator. This technique, he explains in Advertisements for Myself, "makes it possible to interpret the unconscious undercurrents of society" by, as Poirier explains, finding a "stylistic equivalence to the imagined correlation among, social, political, and individual psychoses."

== Analysis and reception ==
Despite its bawdy content, "The Time of Her Time" has been generally accepted as one of Mailer's most well-written short stories. George Steiner notes that "[a]ll of Mailer's obsessions are concentrated and disciplined in this wry tale", and Dearborn avers that the story could reflect Mailer's own "passing fantasy".

Andrew Gordon considers "The Time of Her Time" to be the forerunner to An American Dream. The two works have "a very close relationship in subject matter. ... 'Time' can be considered a test run for Dream, although in some respects it is more acceptable than that novel because it is more ironic and self-mocking." Mailer has been criticized for his usage of "tired stereotypes," of women, Jews, and blacks, present in "The Time of Her Time." The character of Sergius O'Shaugnessy is Mailer's first active narrator, "a Nordic superman who tackles Denise Gondelman... in a sweaty sexual slugfest, a great sporting bout." Due to this and other parallels between Sergius' character and the author, many critics have questioned the authorial gap between Sergius' and Mailer's philosophy of sex. Indeed, Gerald R. Lucas links the Hipster's quest for the "apocalyptic orgasm" in "The White Negro" to Sergius' own sexual romps through the Village, as if the latter seems to be Mailer's literary exemplar of his figuration. Like the Hipster, Sergius is a larger-than-life figure, at least in his own mind, as he teaches bull fighting in Greenwich Village; Lucas suggests that Mailer is setting up the audience's expectations by giving a Hemingway-like hero that must save the girl from her repressive and numbing psychoanalyzed life. Here, Sergius is the opposite of Denise's shrink, Stanford Joyce.

For Mailer, notes Diana Trilling, the orgasm seems to be the measure of psychic well-being, speaking for its paramount importance in "Time" and its attack on civilizing psychoanalysis. Trilling considers the contest between Sergius and Denise as a battle of egos: Denise has been satisfied by Sergius, and she doesn't like it, so she must do her best to rob him of his masculine pride. This leaves both parties battered by the end, and Denise "bound again for the Freudian couch" where she initially learned how to defeat Sergius in the first place. In contrast, Eric Heyne sees Denise as having learned all she needed from Sergius — having become "a real killer" — thus she is ready to move on at the end.

Sergius identifies his penis as "the avenger," lending some credence to Denise's labeling him a "phallic narcissist," and, as Lucas points out, makes us consider just what it is his penis is avenging. Gordon evaluates Sergius as a typical incomplete hero from Mailer's work, failing to fulfill his full potential due to self-doubt and weakness, while Dearborn interprets Sergius as having an "absolute contempt for women" — his actions bespeaking a "terrible misogyny". The act of sex is often portrayed as a type of combat or warfare in the short story. Here, is Sergius supposed to be the bull fighter, and Denise the bull, in need of slaying with his sword? Sex "takes on the qualities of a championship boxing match, an encounter between a matador and bull or an epic struggle for survival between two savage beasts in a jungle clearing." Yet, Sergius, interprets Heyne, is here like a Hemingway hero: a victim of "doomed courage." Just when his ego has been reduced to the point where he would be receptive to life lessons from Denise, she is gone. It seems Mailer has pulled a reversal: it was actually Denise that was the matador.

Helon Howell Raines has written extensively on the sexual metaphor present here. The sex between Denise and Sergius is a struggle between the masculine and the feminine qualities present in both of them. Sergius "sees himself as the virile male," while Denise is his "physical and sexual opposite." Thus Sergius must conquer "the male in her to acquire ("ingest") her desirable masculine qualities ... he needs to reduce her to the status of helpless female." Only by taking Denise's masculine attributes for himself is O'Shaugnessy able to bolster his own masculinity and conquer the female, "thereby defeating and subjugating any suggestion of the female in himself. For him to allow any of his own female characteristics to emerge would be to allow the possibility that he could be conquered, dependent, inferior." Nevertheless, Mailer does indicate "an awareness of the androgynous nature of the human psyche" by recognizing the mixture of masculine and feminine traits in both Denise and Sergius. When Denise leaves Sergius post-coitus for the last time in the work, she accuses him of being a closeted homosexual. His reaction reveals "that his fear of female sexuality is coupled with his knowledge of himself as a possible female victim." Mailer's world is one "dominated by the masculine ideals of violence, virility, and vitality." Here "a man must be a sexual master in order to achieve and maintain social and cultural power," while the admission of femininity, "which O'Shaugnessy equates with homosexuality ... is to lose."

James Shapiro of the New York Times links the title of Mailer's 1998 collection of his works, The Time of Our Time, and the short story bearing a similar title. Just as Sergius strips Denise of her "innocence" in "The Time of Her Time," Mailer has done the same for his reading public. Taking the parallel even further, as Denise turns her back on her revelatory sexual experience with Sergius, the reading public may turn its back on "Mailer's considerable insights into those parts of ourselves and our culture we may not be eager to face."

== Adaptations and reprints ==
In 2000, "The Time of Her Time" was adapted by Francis Delia into an erotic film starring Linden Ashby and Leslie Bega. Mailer chose "Time" as his best short story for Writer's Choice: Each of Twenty American Authors Introduces His Own Best Story in 1974. "Time" was also reprinted in The Short Fiction of Norman Mailer in 1967 and The Time of Our Time in 1998.

== See also ==
- Advertisements for Myself
- "The White Negro"
- The Short Fiction of Norman Mailer
