= Ned Polsky =

American author and sociologist

Ned Polsky (October 20, 1928 – June 13, 2000) was an American author and sociologist who wrote the 1969 book Hustlers, Beats, and Others, about political culture, criminology and pool hustlers. He was also known for his criticism of Norman Mailer's essay The White Negro, included with the essay in later collections of Mailer's work, and as an "insane Joyce fanatic" who memorized long passages from Finnegans Wake.

Polsky studied linguistics and literature at the University of Wisconsin, and pursued graduate studies in sociology at the University of Chicago, although he did not complete his degree. He was for many years a professor of sociology at Stony Brook University, and served as vice president of the Society for the Study of Social Problems in 1971–1972. He was also a skilled three-cushion billiard player, and in his retirement became an antiquarian bookseller.

In 1968, he signed the "Writers and Editors War Tax Protest" pledge, vowing to refuse tax payments in protest against the Vietnam War.
