= The Time of Our Time =

1998 book by Norman Mailer

- Author: Norman Mailer
- Language: English
- Published: 1998 (Modern Library)
- Publication place: United States
- Media type: Print
- Pages: 1,286
- ISBN: 978-0-375-50097-8
- OCLC: 37854411

The Time of Our Time is an anthology of Norman Mailer's various literary works, published by Modern Library in 1998. The work was designed to commemorate both the fiftieth anniversary of The Naked and the Dead (1948), and Mailer's seventy-fifth birthday. Norman Mailer edited the anthology himself, choosing to organize the content not by the chronology in which the pieces are written, but the chronology of the events that the works describe; some of the excerpts are written in the midst of the action, while others may come upon forty years of reflection. Selected texts that deal with the ancient world, however, appear out of sequence at the end of the volume. (Mailer's explanation: "Nobody is perfect.") Excerpts from Mailer's most notable works, including The Naked and the Dead, Advertisements for Myself (1959), "Superman Comes to the Supermarket" (1960), The Armies of the Night (1968), Miami and the Siege of Chicago (1968), Of a Fire on the Moon (1970), and The Executioner's Song (1979), as well as several works in their entirety, including "The White Negro: Superficial Reflections on the Hipster" (1957), "The Time of Her Time" (1959), and various transcribed and annotated interviews with the likes of William F. Buckley, Gore Vidal, Kate Millett, and John Ehrlichman.

Mailer endeavored to produce not an anthology, but a book that offers "some hint at a social and cultural history over these last fifty years." The compendium he produced reflects the way his sense of the character shifted each decade, and many of the works derive from his sense of the value of fiction. "There is little in this book even when it comes under the formal category of non-fiction or argument," he writes, "that has not derived, then, from my understanding of how one writes fiction."

The New York Times review of The Time of Our Time characterizes the work as a "neatly interwoven" collection that tells a story of its own, a "social history of postwar America, at the heart of which is Mailer's own tangled love affair with this country." And while "Mailer's technical skills may not have declined in the ensuing decades, his cultural authority has, and The Time of Our Time offers some clues as to why." Meanwhile, The Hudson Review admitted that despite "all its weaknesses," The Time of Our Time "does add up to a relatively coherent subjective account of our times," covering such topics as the Cold War, the Kennedy assassination, the civil rights and antiwar movements, the Moon landing, women's lib, and Watergate, among others.
