= Advertisements for Myself =

1959 book by Norman Mailer

- Cover of first edition
- Author: Norman Mailer
- Language: English
- Genre: collection of various genres, autobiography
- Published: 1959
- Publisher: Harvard University Press
- Publication place: United States of America
- ISBN: 0-674-00590-2

Advertisements for Myself is an omnibus collection of fiction, essays, verse, and fragments by Norman Mailer, with autobiographical commentaries that he calls "advertisements." Advertisements was published by G.P. Putnam's Sons in 1959 after Mailer secured his reputation with The Naked and the Dead, then endured setbacks with the less-enthusiastic reception of Barbary Shore (1951) and The Deer Park (1955). Advertisements, though chaotic, unapologetically defiant, and often funny, marks the beginning of Mailer's mature style.

Advertisements, with its new interest in counterculture, politics, and sexual liberation, is a key book among the dozens that Mailer produced and helped to create his persona as a swaggering, anti-establishment writer and explore "the web of relations between personal valor and virtue and literary growth and mastery" and serving as Mailer's "announcement that he was king of the literary hill." While initial sales were modest, Advertisements received many strong reviews, notably from Alfred Kazin and Irving Howe, and the New York Times Book Review, Partisan Review, and the Village Voice.

== A Note to the Reader ==
This section explains the book's two tables of contents. The first lists the contents of the book in chronological order, while the second table of contents categorizes the pieces based on genre, such as fiction, essays, and interviews. Mailer lists what he believes are his best pieces in the book, which are: The Man Who Studied Yoga, "The White Negro", "The Time of Her Time", "Dead Ends", and "Advertisements for Myself on the Way Out".

== First Advertisement for Myself ==
Mailer gives readers his perspective, at age 36, on his writing, other writers, and the state of the nation. He believes his work, present and future, will be a key influence on those practicing his craft. In pulling together this collection of short novels, short stories, essays and advertisements, he's making his case and showing how he's matured as a writer over the years. Though at times in his career he was influenced by Ernest Hemingway, he points to the author as a writer who didn't grow. "Hemingway has always been afraid to think, afraid of losing even a little popularity… and his words excite no thought in the best of my rebel generation". It's a generation that he believes has grown up in a world "more in decay than the worst of the Roman Empire." Still, he gives Hemingway credit for knowing the value of his own work and fighting to make his personality enrich his books. A writer's personality, Mailer observes, can determine how much attention readers give his work. "The way to save your work and reach more readers is to advertise yourself."

== Part One: Beginnings ==
This section includes Mailer's earliest works, written when he was a student at Harvard. Mailer admits that he is not particularly proud of the pieces in this section, but has included them for the readers who are interested in his early works. The pieces in this section are:

- Advertisement for A Calculus at Heaven - The author writes that A Calculus at Heaven is his attempt, as a young writer, to imagine what war might really be like.
- A Calculus at Heaven (short novel) - Set in the Pacific theater during World War II, five American soldiers - greatly outnumbered by enemy forces - have orders to maintain control of the nearby coastal road at all cost.
- Advertisement for "The Greatest Thing in the World" - In his explanation of this short story, Mailer writes that it won first place in a Story magazine contest in 1941. Still, he was embarrassed to read it in later years. The only redeeming quality he can find in the story, in hindsight, is its sense of pace.
- "The Greatest Thing in the World" (short story) - Al Groot, a broke and hungry drifter, tries to out-maneuver a couple of hustlers he meets at a diner on a rainy night.
- Advertisement for "Maybe Next Year" - The author describes the prose in "Maybe Next Year" as Salinger-ish, but said the inspiration was really Faulkner. Just a month or so before the story's writing, Mailer had read The Sound and the Fury.
- "Maybe Next Year" (short story) - Set during the Great Depression, a 9-year-old boy retreats into the woods and meadows near his home during his parents’ frequent fights over money.

== Part Two: Middles ==
The second section features the short stories Mailer wrote hoping to keep up with the fame and notoriety that followed his best selling novel, The Naked and the Dead.

- "Second Advertisement for Myself" - After his stint in the Army, Mailer spent all his time working on The Naked and the Dead. The novel was a bigger success than he would have ever imagined. But it led to questions about whether he ever would be able to repeat that success. In a sense, he writes, he may have been trying to evade that question by writing Barbary Shore.
- Excerpts from Barbary Shore - Michael Lovett, a WWII vet, moves into a boarding house in Brooklyn, where he plans to write a novel. At the boarding house, he observes and interacts with the other characters who live there.
- "Third Advertisement for Myself" - The timing was right for The Naked and the Dead, Mailer writes. It came out when everyone was ready for a long war novel. The timing was wrong for Barbary Shore. The media at the time seemed interested in getting America back to chastity, regularity, the safe, he writes. Mailer includes a number of bad reviews the novel received. The criticisms lead the author to turn his attention to short stories.
- Advertisement for "Three War Stories" - Mailer describes writing ten short stories in a few weeks, using the same method: He'd start in the morning, finish the same day or give up on the idea. He writes that he takes no great pride in the stories.
- "The Paper House" - World War II is over, and Nicholson and his pseudo-friend Hayes are stationed with a company of men in a small Japanese city. The two take frequent trips to a geisha house, where Nicholson longs for the company of Hayes’ regular geisha.
- "The Language of Men" - Sanford Carter, an insecure GI, feels completely worthless in the Army until he becomes a cook. Initially satisfied in the job, he goes through great lengths to gain the approval of his fellow soldiers. But, when they grow indifferent to his efforts, he's forced to stand up for himself.
- "The Dead Gook" - Short story about a group of soldiers who help a group of Gooks, which are Filipino men. The Gooks take the soldiers on a quest to find one of their men who was killed by Japanese soldiers. Brody, one of the soldiers, hates the Gooks and doesn't care about the dead one until the end when he finally realized they weren't so bad.
- Advertisement for "The Notebook" - The author talks about when "The Notebook" was first published in The Cornhill magazine. Mailer writes how he received many comments about this story and how it had the most comments out of all his stories that were published in English newspapers. He also writes about how he only wrote this story in an hour and was criticized by some of his readers.
- "The Notebook" - Story focuses on a young writer and his girlfriend. They are on a walk when they begin to argue about the writer who never pays attention to his lady. The only thing he pays attention to is his notebook where he writes down all of his ideas for future works. This, in turn, causes a bigger issue, and the lady leaves the writer to be alone with his notebook until he realizes how much his lady meant to him.
- Advertisement for "The Man Who Studied Yoga." - In this advertisement for "The Man Who Studied Yoga", Mailer talks about how he was planning on this piece to be a prologue to an eight-part novel. He wanted his characters to appear in each part but at different ages. After finishing the first part, "The Deer Park", he realized an eight-part novel wasn't going to happen and settled for one with "The Man Who Studied Yoga" as the prologue.
- "The Man Who Studied Yoga" (A short novel which served the prologue for The Deer Park) - "The Man Who Studied Yoga" is about a man named Sam Slovoda and his wife, Eleanor. Sam and Eleanor are at constant state of anxiety over their sex life. Their friends end up finding an old pornographic film, and they all gather at the Slovodas’ house to watch it. Afterward, their friends leave, and Eleanor and Sam are having relations while Sam is constantly overthinking if he is doing everything right. In the end, Sam stresses himself out and knows that when he meets his psychoanalyst the next day, he is going to have to explain everything to him.
- Advertisement for "Three Political Pieces" - In this advertisement, Mailer talks about his pieces that were first published in the symposium in the Partisan Review in 1951 and 1952. "The Meaning of Western Defense" and "David Reisman Reconsidered" are the two pieces he talks about. Mailer mentions how different the two pieces are, in terms of how they are written.
- "Our Country and Our Culture" (Partisan Review Symposium) - Mailer discusses how writers were not respected as war writers and that a lot of writers were feeling alienated during this symposium. He talks about whether or not writers were ever more alienated than that day. Mailer also discusses how the literary history of that time was mostly produced by the newer, younger writers.
- "David Riesman Reconsidered" - A review by Mailer of Riesman's Individualism Reconsidered. He talks about the only other review he had seen, which was Granville Hick's review in 1954. Throughout the review, he critiques Riesman's work and talks about which ones he thought were actually impressive and which ones he thought to be completely boring.
- "The Meaning of Western Defense" - Mailer gives his thoughts on the Western Defense and how believes it was the ultimate reason for the Western annihilation. He discusses imperialism and Monopoly Capitalism. Mailer talks about what needs to be done in order to gain a socialist world.

== Part Three: Births ==
The third section consists of Mailer's writings for Time, Newsweek, and One, ending with several columns written for The Village Voice. The primary features of this section are:

- Advertisement for Part Three - The articles and novel found in this section were considered by Mailer to be some of his worst works. However, he states that he included them due to the personal growth that he experienced while writing them.
- Advertisement for "The Homosexual Villain" - In the 1950s, Mailer was contacted to write an article for One - the Homosexual Magazine. After months of avoiding the situation, he finally sat down and wrote "The Homosexual Villain."
- "The Homosexual Villain" - Mailer states that his previous bigoted opinions of homosexuals experienced gradual changes over the course of a few years. He attributes these changes to Donald Cory's The Homosexual in America and becoming friends with his homosexual neighbor.
- Fourth Advertisement for myself: The Last Draft of The Deer Park - Mailer's third novel was originally turned down by Rinehart & Company for extreme vulgarity and obscenity. The novel was eventually published up by G.P. Putnam's Sons for publication. The Deer Park underwent extensive editing by Mailer, who identified marijuana and other drugs to be his motivation behind the editing process.
- Three Excerpts From Rinehart and Putnam Versions of The Deer Park -
  - Rinehart Page Proof:
    - (Pages 1–3)- Sergius O’Shaugnessy, a former Air Force man, arrives in the Southern California town of Desert D’Or.
    - (Pages 134-8) - Teppis describes how his lover, Lulu, is considerably flighty and easily distracted. Yet, she maintains a serene control in her career and in-and-out of the bedroom.
    - (Page 277) - Teppis is giving sexual praises to a young girl by the name of Bobby.
  - Changes found in the Putnam Edition:
    - (Pages 1–3) - Mailer adds in more details to O’Shaugnessy's past by mentioning that he is an orphan. He also removes the notion that bungalows are considerably intimate.
    - (Pages 134-9) - Mailer changes Teppis perception of Lulu. In the previous draft, he wrote Teppis as someone who could not find fault in Lulu. However, here Teppis describes Lulu as someone who is conceited and spoiled, and that they have fought because of her disregard for him. But he ignores those faults simply because they are superb lovers.
    - (Page 284, previously page 277) - Mailer switches over to the third person point of view from the first person point of view in this edition. He also includes more endearments, such as darling and angel, to describe Bobby.
- Two Reviews: Time and Newsweek - Time – "Love Among the Love-Buckets"— The Deer Park is about medically discharged Sergius O’Shaugnessy of the Air Force, who experiences trauma and impotence due to dropping napalm on Korean villages. He wishes to write and decides to spend time in a desert gambling resort called Desert D’Or. The Deer Park is meant to be overly sexualized for both of the genders. The women are reminiscent of the vulgar boys found in Mailer's The Naked and The Dead. Newsweek – "Norman Mailer's Despair"— The Deer Park is a study of moral confusion and despair among the masses of the American people. Mailer shows mastery experience within the multiple colors of disillusionment and the morbidity of expecting sexual fascinations as a form of duty rather than affection. Mailer's novel speaks of people everywhere who have succumbed to their appetites and have lost their spirits among the temptations of this world.
- Postscript to the Fourth Advertisement for Myself - Following the finally editing of The Deer Park, Mailer attempted to self promote the novel by sending copies to a few well known authors. The lack of response caused a sense of shame for Mailer. He claimed the experience was the motivation for a new era of boldness, half-done work, unbalanced heroics, and a more than a little bit of violence within him.
- Advertisement for Sixty-Nine Questions and Answers - Mailer stated that about a month after The Deer Park had been released, a friend, Lyle Stuart editor of The Independent, sent him a list of sixty-nine questions for an interview. He claimed that he glanced over the questions before answering them with a brain full of marijuana. He gave one apology for a fatuous remark about Henry Miller early on in the interview. He also gave an anticipation of the fact that he originally answered the questions with a confidence that The Deer Park would become a best seller. However, this confidence turns into an intricate narcissism when the interview was published in The Village Voice.
- "Sixty-Nine Questions and Answers" (an interview with Lyle Stuart)
- Fifth Advertisement for Myself - General Marijuana: Mailer writes about the birth of The Village Voice in the 1950s by Dan Wolf, Edwin Fancher, and himself. He also provides that he considers marijuana to be his secret weapon.
- The Village Voice: First Three Columns - Mailer discusses the differences between novelists. He states that good novelists suffer from several different mental problems. He continues to state that The Voice received an initial negative feedback.
- Postscript to the First Three Columns - Mailer lists examples of what was removed from the columns.
- The Village Voice: Columns Four to Seventeen - Mailer discusses communication, parody, and truth. He discusses how his friends, such as Robert Linders, impacted his life. He goes on to break down Linders' work sentence by sentence. He also discusses Ernest Hemingway and the play Waiting for Godot - something he has never seen or read, but has read many reviews.
- Advertisement for the End of a Column and a Public Notice - After quitting his column, Mailer discusses reading and going to see the play Waiting for Godot.
- A Public Notice on Waiting for Godot - Mailer makes a public apology for describing Beckett's play as a poem to impotency in his last column. Mailer discusses some of the play's characters. He then breaks down what he felt Beckett was saying.

== Part Four: Hipsters ==
In the fourth section, Mailer criticizes the cultural movement of the Beat Generation and questions what exactly it means to be hip between the 1920s and 1950s. Along with the highly controversial essay "The White Negro", this section consists of a series of advertisements, exchanges, interviews, and essays, including:

- Sixth Advertisement for Myself - In "Sixth Advertisement for Myself" Mailer discusses his break from writing and how he came back to it. He got help from Lyle Stuart who was first-rate as a journalist. Mailer goes on to talk about his first time writing after giving it up and all of the advice he got from other writers such as Faulkner, William Bradford and Eleanor Roosevelt.
- "The White Negro" - "The White Negro" is a controversial work that was first published in Dissent summer 1957 issue. This work talks about young white people, known as hipsters, between the 1920s and 1950s who started to adopt African American culture as their own. Throughout, Mailer discusses the ways hipsters took on the African American culture and how they perceived themselves during this time.
- Note to "Reflections on Hip" - In a "Note to Reflections on Hip", Mailer tells us about the exchange between Jean Malaquais and Ned Polsky about a modern revolution and other cures for neurosis. He also says that he did not choose the title for this original publication in Dissent when it was called "Reflections on Hipsterism".
- "Reflections on Hip" - In "Reflections on Hip", Jean Malaquais and Ned Polsky talk about their opinions on hipsters and one Mailer's "The White Negro". Mailer responds to each one of their reflections and comments throughout this work and discusses whether or not he agrees or disagrees with what they have to say.
- "Hipster and Beatnik" (A Footnote to "The White Negro")- Mailer discusses the differences between hipsters and beatniks. He talks about how the hipsters are more Zen while a beatnik is more likely to be sentimental and how well they can live side by side.
- Advertisement for "Hip, Hell, and the Navigator" - In the "Advertisement for Hip, Hell, and The Navigator", Mailer talks about his interview with Richard G. Stern. He mentions that he was tired during this interview so he rushed into different conversations that he would never usually have with someone. He also says that this was probably his most sincere interview he had ever done.
- "Hip, Hell, and the Navigator" - "Hip, Hell, and The Navigator" is an interview of Mailer by Richard G. Stern. Unlike the other stories throughout this book, this interview is written out by Stern, not Mailer. Stern conducts the interview and ask Mailer questions about "The White Negro" and other works he has done, hipsters, and his style of writing. The original tape recording for this interview is in the Harper Library of the University of Chicago.

== Part Five: Games and Ends ==
In this section, Mailer explains how he structures the last three sections of his book after his World War II patrol. He patterns these sections in such a way as to avoid "ambush[ing] my readers needlessly," just as he and his fellow-patrolmen had sought to avoid ambush.

- Advertisement for "IT" - In his explanation of his short story "IT", Mailer writes that it is the shortest story he had ever written.
- "IT" (short story) - A soldier experiences decapitation as a result of machine gunfire. This story was inspired by a lecture on the beginnings of World War II.
- Advertisement for "Great in the Hay" - Mailer describes how he wrote the short story, "Great in the Hay", as a young impressionable writer in Hollywood. This story has been used as an "actor's bit" at many parties over the years.
- "Great in the Hay" (short story) - Two producers are similar in every way except that one is a better lover than the other. The latter tries to determine what the difference is.
- Advertisement for "The Patron Saint of Macdougal Alley" - Mailer describes how his short story, "The Patron Saint of Macdougal Alley," was turned down by the New Yorker.
- "The Patron Saint of Macdougal Alley" (short story) - This story is about a philosopher cannot comprehend the passage of time. He drifts from place to place and is eventually turned away by his many hosts.
- Advertisement for a Letter to the New York Post - The author claims that he had nothing to do with the making of the movie The Naked and the Dead. He also describes his regrets concerning his sale of the book to the man responsible for producing the movie.
- "A Letter to the New York Post" (letter) - Mailer counters several accusations made against him by Paul Gregory, producer of the movie, The Naked and the Dead.
- "How to Commit Murder in the Mass-Media-A" - Mailer describes how he was persuaded to broadcast for the Canadian Broadcasting System. He explains how the media employs sound techniques to brainwash the populace.
- "How to Commit Murder in the Mass-Media-B" - In the second part to "How to Commit Murder in the Mass Media", Mailer reflects on his first television appearance. Using his experience as an example, he describes how the media creates bias by portraying certain viewpoints negatively or positively.
- Advertisement for "Buddies" - Mailer writes how he wrote the beginnings of a play that had the potential to be a success. However, after being distracted by outside interferences, he describes how he lost his train of thought making it impossible to complete the play.
- "Buddies, or Hole in the Summit" (play) - This short piece is the beginning fragment of an unfinished play by Mailer. It is a fictional, comedic, conversation between Eisenhower and Khrushchev.
- Postscript to Buddies - In this section, Mailer explains the inspiration for the play, "Buddies, or whole in the Summit". He writes how he and his friend, Howard Fertig, explored the possibilities of creating a novel based on the interactions between the world's two superpowers.
- Advertisement for "Notes Toward a Psychology of the Orgy" - The author writes how he attempted to write an essay on the topic of psychology. However, he soon gave up the project when he realized that the only way to "satisfy the title was to write a book."
- The Hip and the Square: I. The List - The author lists the items he had planned to discuss in his essay, "Notes Toward a Psychology of the Orgy". Listed are a total of one-hundred and thirty items encompassing a wide range of topics related to psychology.
- The Hip and the Square: II. Catholic and Protestant - Mailer explains his difficulties in starting his unfinished essay, "Notes Toward A Psychology of the Orgy." He notes that the wide range of discussion on Catholicism and Protestantism alone would be far beyond the bounds of an essay.
- The Hip and the Square: T-formation and Single Wing - Mailer discusses the differences between Single Wing and T-formation techniques of football. He especially notes how each technique relates to Hip, discussed earlier in Advertisements for Myself.
- A Note on Comparative Pornography - The author discusses how modern advertisement has greatly influenced human-kind.
- From Surplus Value to the Mass Media - An exploration of how and why consumers place much greater value on products that reduce home labor. He notes how this is especially driven by the desire to achieve the "four or five ideal hours of extra leisure a day."
- Sources—A Riddle in Psychiacal Economy - This section is composed of a riddle for the readers of Advertisements for Myself. It asks the readers to determine the author(s) of a written passage.
- "Lament of A Lady" (poem) - A short poem contrasting the laments of a woman who hasn't found a man who can satisfy her.
- "I Got Two Kids and Another in the Oven" (poem) - This poem contrasts the relationship between an oven and its bread with a father and his son.
- Advertisement for the "Deer Park" as a Play - Mailer discusses his upcoming play The Deer Park. He especially notes the differences between the play and the actual novel of the same name.
- The Deer Park (Scenes two, three, four) (play) - Excerpts from Mailer's play, The Deer Park. This play deals with fictional Hollywood characters at a desert resort.
- An Eye on Picasso - In this section, Mailer discusses the works of Picasso. He especially notes how the painter used physical objects to represent concepts.
- Evaluations—Quick and Expensive Comments on the Talent in the Room - Mailer evaluates the talent of his fellow contemporaries including, James Jones, Willian Styron, Truman Capote, and Saul Bellow. He bases his opinions on their works and personalities.
- Last Advertisement for Myself Before the Way Out - The author discusses his perspectives on talent in America. He also discusses his ambitions in the writing field.
- Note for "The Time of Her Time" - The author discusses his new novel The Time of Her Time. He decides that it is more appropriate to end Advertisements for Myself with the prologue from the novel.
- "The Time of Her Time" (short story) - Excerpts from Mailer's, The Time of Her Time. This story is centered around a young bullfighter and a Jewish college girl.
- Advertisement for Dead Ends - In this advertisement, Mailer discusses one of his new novels, Dead Ends. He gives a brief overview of the novel's potential plot and characters.
- Dead Ends (novel) - This work examines the ways in which men seek to avoid cancer.
- Advertisements for Myself on the Way Out - Mailer introduces himself and comments on the prior generation of American writers. He also discusses worldwide factors that influence writers.

== Reception ==
Initial reactions to this book were widely negative because of its controversial content. But many changed their views over time and came to value and appreciate the perspective of Norman Mailer, whose book gave a voice to the younger generation.

The first edition from Putnam featured a photograph of Mailer wearing a yachting cap, for which the author was criticized. Mailer's publisher, Walter Minton, thought the photograph of Mailer was a little silly. But Mailer thought it made him look handsome, and he argued Minton down.

Mailer writes: "So Advertisements became the book in which I tried to separate my legitimate spiritual bile from my self-pity and maybe it was the hardest continuing task I had yet set myself. What aggravated every problem was that I was also trying to give up smoking, and the advertisements in this book, printed in italics, are testimony to the different way I was now obliged to use language."

Ernest Hemingway, in a letter to George Plimpton, characterized the book "as a sort of ragtag assembly of his rewrites, second thoughts and ramblings shot through with occasional brilliance".

Harry T. Moore, who founded the first branch of the NAACP, describes Norman Mailer's stories as "vigorous and often amusing attacks on the society the Squares have built." He would later go on to describe the collections as having interesting views on society.

Charles I. Glicksberg, a literary critic, wrote in Norman Mailer: The Angry Young Novelist In America: "Norman Mailer's latest production, Advertisements for Myself, is a painful book to read not because the author is so grimly determined to unburden himself of all his grievances and resentments but because he reveals an aspect of himself as a writer that is not pleasant to contemplate."

Gore Vidal, a literary journalist, describes the collection as a "wide graveyard of still-born talents which contains so much of the brief ignoble history of American letters, (the book) is a tribute to the power of a democracy to destroy its critics, brave fools and passionate men". As he continued to view Mailer's collection, he would later believe them to have been revolutionary in the development of the literary world.

Harold Bloom wrote "When I think of him [Norman Mailer] , "Advertisements for Myself" comes into my memory more readily than any other work, perhaps because he is his own supreme fiction" (Harold Bloom, Novelists and Novels, 2007, page 478).

David Brooks of the NewNovels," page,478). York Times cited the book as an example of a then-emergent and now-ubiquitous culture of self-exposure and self-love that stands in stark contrast to the humility that exemplified America at the close of World War II.

== Cultural influence ==
While not initially famous to the overall public, Advertisements for Myself appealed to a genre of people who were considered outcasts in society. For those who enjoyed the collection, it was described as having "won the admiration of a younger generation seeking alternative styles of life and art." The younger generation, at the time, found it inspirational. Many also believed that this work "gave Mailer a new audience and set the stage for the sixties" as it gave way to a new movement through the voices of the younger generation. It would later be considered the peak of Mailer's literary career, often being cited as his most remembered work.

According to historian Douglas Brinkley, a close friend of writer Hunter S. Thompson, Advertisements for Myself served as a model for Thompson's first anthology, The Great Shark Hunt (1979).
