= Why Are We in Vietnam? =

1967 novel by Norman Mailer

Why Are We In Vietnam?
- First edition
- Author: Norman Mailer
- Language: English
- Genre: Novel
- Publisher: G. P. Putnam's Sons
- Publication date: 1967
- Publication place: United States
- Media type: Print Hardback
- Preceded by: An American Dream
- Followed by: The Armies of the Night

Why Are We In Vietnam? (WWVN) is a 1967 novel by the American author Norman Mailer. It focuses on a hunting trip to the Brooks Range in Alaska where a young man is brought by his father, a wealthy businessman who works for a company that makes cigarette filters and is obsessed with killing a grizzly bear. As the novel progresses, the protagonist is increasingly disillusioned that his father resorts to hunting tactics that seem dishonest and weak, including the use of a helicopter and taking credit for killing a bear. At the end of the novel, the protagonist tells the reader that he is soon going to serve in the Vietnam War as a soldier.

WWVN contains vivid descriptions of Alaska; polarizing, obscene, and stream-of-consciousness narration; and shifting points of view. Mailer uses the narrative to implicitly answer the question the novel's title asks: it demonstrates the attitudes and actions of the United States that landed it in Vietnam. Its experimental style alienated many readers, but earned the novel a nomination for the National Book Award.

== Background ==
During the spring of 1966 in Provincetown, Mailer initially intended to write a novel about a gang of bikers and their girlfriends who lived in the scrub thickets of Provincetown's sand dunes. To bring "such literary horrors" to Provincetown would be a sin, so instead, he chose to write a prelude about two Texas boys hunting in Alaska, similar to Mailer's own recent trip up north. His characters would be based on members of the U.S. Army's 112th Cavalry out of San Antonio, in which Mailer served in World War II. After writing about the hunt in Alaska he planned for the story to focus on Provincetown, but by the time he finished writing the story of the hunt, he realized he had a complete story. Mailer later said of WWVN: "Sometimes I think it's the best 200 pages I've yet done. The most American, certainly the 200 pages least alienated from genius".

== Publication ==
While Mailer had parted ways with Putnam's, he was contractually obligated to write them another book—the all-American "big one" he had talked about writing since The Naked and the Dead. He wrote WWVN quickly, in about half the time of An American Dream which is comparable in size. Yet, Walter Minton his editor at Putnam's, dismissed the book as too short to satisfy his commitment to Putnam's, but published it nevertheless since Mailer had already spent their advance. Since the book is highly metaphorical, Mailer suggested to Minton that he include a statement that explained as much in a press release: "Norman Mailer is saying, 'This perhaps is what we Americans are like, and this may be one of the reasons we're engaged in such a war.' "

== Characters ==
Randy D.J. Jethroe—The narrator and protagonist of the novel, he recalls the trip to Alaska while at a dinner for him in Dallas, Texas, the night before he is shipped off to Vietnam.

Tex Hyde—D.J.'s best friend, who represents the conservative Texan. He and D.J. are hyper-masculine, crude and unrefined together, but the story shows the depths of their friendship.

Rusty Jethroe—Rusty's father and an executive of a cigarette filter company. He organizes the hunting trip in order to ensure his dominance among other men. He is "the cream of corporation corporateness" and the embodiment of all that has led the United States into the Vietnam War.

M.A. Pete and M.A. Bill—"Medium Assholes", or yes-men, as opposed to Rusty who is a "High-Grade Asshole". Rusty brings them along to help with the hunt and as witnesses to his masculine power.

Big Luke Fellinka—The hunting expedition's guide, he has a lot of knowledge of Alaska's Brooks Range and dictates when and what they hunt. He is also a conformist and capitalist conservative.

== Summary ==
Why Are We in Vietnam? is set on the evening before its protagonist and narrator D.J. leaves for the war in Vietnam. The bulk of the narrative follows Ranald "D.J." Jethroe, his friend Tex Hyde, and his father Rusty on a hunting trip in Alaska that had happened two years previously.

The book begins by introducing the families of D.J. and Tex before the hunt. Both families have deep Texas bloodlines and both characters possess gritty and dogged appearances and mannerisms. Soon they reach the Brooks Mountain Range, where they will hunt for several days, hoping to bag a prize grizzly bear. Using a massive assortment of guns, they bring down Dall rams, wolves, and caribou. They finally shoot a pair of bears, but the following day Rusty convinces his son, D.J., to go hunting on their own to ensure a higher chance of killing a bear. Filled with terror they follow a grizzly track and have intimate father-son conversations when suddenly a bear comes out of nowhere and nearly kills D.J. before they both shoot it and it darts off. Finally tracking the bear, Rusty steals his son's kill of the grizzly.

The following morning Tex and D.J. wake up before the rest of the group and go into the wilderness without any supplies, in order to have a different, more enthralling experience with nature. Without a compass, sleeping bag, or defense except their wit and hands, they hike through the mountain range, observing the wonders of nature and stalking wild packs of animals. Even encountering a bear, they feel as close as brothers and are brought to a primal existence many only dream to obtain. The novel ends, knowing the two would be sent to Vietnam the following morning.

== Style ==
Why Are We in Vietnam? employs an experimental style that joins vivid description, slang, obscenity, and hallucinogenic stream-of-consciousness. Its narrator D.J. ("Disc Jockey" or "Dr. Jekyll") plays with identity throughout the narrative: he switches from first- to third-person and also changes perspectives from a privileged teenager in Texas, to a crippled black man in Harlem. Each chapter ("Chap") is preceded by an "Intro Beep" that offers commentary on the events, and the narrative's time and place shift from the present, which is the night before D.J. and Tex ship out to Vietnam, to their trip to Alaska two years before the present in which the novel is set. Dearborn states that WWVN, while dealing with heavy issues, also illustrates Mailer's love of language—in the obscenity that, for Mailer, "expressed the humanity of America, as expressed in its humor". While it alludes to both Joyce's Ulysses and Burroughs' Naked Lunch, WWVN is fairly simple by comparison.

== Analysis ==
Even though the Vietnam War is not mentioned until the last page of the novel, critical analyses concur that the novel itself is the implicit answer to the question the title poses: why is the US involved in military action in Vietnam? In her foreword to the 2017 release of WWVN, Maggie McKinley identifies dominant concerns in the novel: "corrupt capitalism, corporate elitism, American imperialism, and aggressive hyper-masculinity". These themes are realized through the technological superiority that allows the hunters to dominate and decimate the animals they hunt. This use of technology, opines Fulgham, reduces these hunters to the basest level and represents a "virulent, malignant evil". This bizarre bear hunt, like a retelling of Faulkner's classic "The Bear", becomes an extended metaphor that illustrates the quest for an American identity inherent in the self-destructive attitudes that precipitated the hostilities in Vietnam. Eliot Fremont-Smith suggests that WWVN shows that "violence is as American as cherry pie": the novel explores a misplaced and misshaped American masculinity while exposing the county's darkest urges, replacing any potential of tender connections with outward aggression and violence.

Poirer suggests that D.J.'s internal conversations show "two opposed notions of himself at the same time" and posits a minority within. It is the presence of the minority within that binds all human beings on a more cosmic level: "We are all of one another". D.J. explains that "the real author of his autobiographical . . . may be a black man in Harlem"; they are still connected even though they are "dissimilar". D.J.'s narrative is played back through a "psychic tape recorder" which translates the narrative into "distracting elements": "obscene and scientific language".

The characters of M.A. Pete and M.A. Bill are meant to be "reincarnations of 'Big Oil' and 'Big Greed' in the guise of yahoo Texan hunters" according to Donald Kaufmann, the man who showed Mailer the Alaskan wilderness on the trip that inspired Why Are We in Vietnam's setting.

== Reception ==
The critical reception of WWVN was mostly positive with many critics, like John Aldridge in Harper's, calling the novel a masterpiece and comparing it to Joyce. Mailer's obscene language was criticized by critics like Granville Hicks writing in the Saturday Review and the anonymous reviewer in Time. Eliot Fremont-Smith calls WWVN "the most original, courageous and provocative novel so far this year" that's likely to be "mistakenly reviled". Other critics, like Denis Donoghue from the New York Review of Books praised Mailer for his verisimilitude "for the sensory event". Donoghue recalls Josephine Miles' study of the American Sublime, reasoning WWVN's voice and style as the drive behind Mailer's impact.

In 1972, Joyce Carol Oates called Vietnam "Mailer's most important work"; it's "an outrageous little masterpiece" that "contains some of Mailer's finest writing" and thematically echoes Milton's Paradise Lost.

In a 1967 review of Why Are We in Vietnam for The Village Voice, Eugene Glenn praises WWVN, calling it "a triumph, powerful, original, brilliant in substance and in formal means." He views D.J. as an exemplary and constructive character, one who "sees right through shit" in order to get to the root of the moral decay in the "American scene" despite any of D.J.'s shortcomings. In summary, Glenn writes: "Why Are We in Vietnam works splendidly as a metaphor for the way things are now."

Christopher Lehman-Haupt takes up Mailer's own intimations of comparisons to the work to James Joyce, and finds WWVN wanting. He laments the book's stilted dialogue and thinly veiled devices as heavy-handed and polemical, arguing that subtleties and verisimilitude are compromised in order for Mailer to plow through to his true ends-an indictment of modern America's greed, blundering, bloody-thirsty war mongering and overreliance on psychoanalysis and technology. Despite what Lehman-Haupt assesses to be Mailer's rather ham-handed, over-extended metaphors, the critic still concedes that WWVN is compelling because, even if D.J. and his hunting companions are little more than three-dimensional marionettes for their creator's manifesto, at least the characters' obtrusive pupeteer is a writer with enough passion, strong ideas and talent to make the novel worthwhile.

In his review in 1967, Broyard uses his article's name A Disturbance of the Peace to describe WWVN. The novel could also be seen as "a sexual obstacle course in the basic training camp of contemporary life." He finds D.J., a sexual hero or an insignificant hero, to be random in his speech. His thoughts are filled with "portmanteau puns" in one moment, and in the next moment "he slips . . . into Negro dialect". Broyard concludes his article by stating that Mailer's novel is a "third-rate work of art" but a "first-rate outrage to our sensibilities".

In Robert Begiebing's Acts of Regeneration, he views Mailer's WWVN as his most economical narrative.He says that the novel may be Mailer's expression of his own "sense of defeat by the catastrophic events of the late sixties and an admission of his helplessness and failure before those events."This sense of defeat is shown through the character DJ in the novel which Begiebing says is the defeated hero in the novel.Begiebing considers DJ the defeated hero because of "his guilt that he feels about the wastes of his past, both the wastes of his life as the son of a corporation chief and the wastes of his father's safari two years ago."
