= Barbary Shore =

Novel by Norman Mailer

- First edition
- Author: Norman Mailer
- Language: English
- Publisher: Rinehart & Company
- Publication date: 1951
- Publication place: United States
- Media type: Print (hardcover)
- Preceded by: The Naked and the Dead
- Followed by: The Deer Park

Barbary Shore is Norman Mailer's second published novel, written after Mailer's great success with his 1948 debut The Naked and the Dead. It concerns a protagonist who rents a room in a Brooklyn boarding house with the intention of writing a novel. Wounded during World War II, he is an amnesiac, and much of his past is a secret to him. After Rinehart & Company published the novel in 1951, it received negative reviews and sold poorly. The failure of Barbary Shore and moderate success of Mailer's next novel, The Deer Park (1955) triggered a decade-long hiatus from the novel by Mailer, which ended with the publication of An American Dream in 1965.

== Reviews ==
- "Last of the Leftists?". Time. May 28, 1951. Archived from the original on November 15, 2007.
