= The Deer Park =

1955 novel by Norman Mailer

- Cover of the first edition
- Author: Norman Mailer
- Language: English
- Genre: Hollywood novel
- Publisher: G.P. Putnam's Sons
- Publication date: October 14, 1955
- Publication place: United States
- ISBN: 978-0375700408
- OCLC: 21623916
- Preceded by: Barbary Shore
- Followed by: An American Dream

The Deer Park is a Hollywood novel written by Norman Mailer and published in 1955 by G.P. Putnam's Sons after it was rejected by Mailer's publisher, Rinehart & Company, for obscenity. Despite having already typeset the book, Rinehart claimed that the manuscript's obscenity voided its contract with Mailer. Mailer retained his cousin, the attorney Charles Rembar, who became a noted defense attorney for publishers involved in censorship trials.

Rembar disagreed with Rinehart's characterization of the manuscript as obscene, and threatened to take the publisher to court. Rinehart settled with Mailer, allowing him to keep his advance.

A roman à clef, the metaphorical "Deer Park" is Desert D'Or, California (a fictionalized Palm Springs). A fashionable desert resort, Hollywood's elite converge there for fun and games and relaxation. The novel's protagonist, Sergius O'Shaughnessy (a recently discharged Air Force officer), is a would-be novelist who experiences the moral depravity of the Hollywood community first hand.

The title refers to the Parc-aux-Cerfs ("Deer Park"), a resort Louis XV kept stocked with young women for his personal pleasure.

== Plot summary ==
With fourteen thousand dollars of winnings from a poker game in his pocket, Sergius O'Shaugnessy wanders to Desert D’Or to find a sense of purpose after recently being discharged from the Air Force. Desert D’Or, a fictionalized Palm Springs, is only hours outside of “the capital” (Los Angeles), where movie stars, producers, and other Hollywood moguls flock to the small desert town to escape the bustle of the city. Compared to Hollywood celebrities, O'Shaugnessy comes from modest roots. Raised an orphan, O'Shaugnessy never had a stable life until he became a fighter pilot in the Air Force. His career as a pilot was short-lived, as they medically discharged him for psychological reasons.

O'Shaugnessy narrates the story, and the plot revolves around his experiences and encounters in the secluded desert city. He befriends former Hollywood director Charles Eitel and other celebrities. Supreme Studios blacklisted Eitel after he was uncooperative in front of a Senate Subversive Committee regarding his alleged communist ties. Like O'Shaugnessy, Eitel is at a crossroads in his life. He is in the process of writing a new script but is unconfident of his abilities to produce meaningful work. In addition to Eitel and O'Shaugnessy, the other main characters range from movie star Lulu Meyers and pimp Marion Faye to the up-and-coming producer Collie Munshin and studio mogul Herman Teppis. After arriving to a club where Eital, Teppis, and Teddy Pope who is a closeted homosexual. After nothing Serguis, she dances with him and has sex with him in the car. Sex, alcohol, and adultery is widespread throughout Desert D’Or, and O'Shaugnessy and Eitel both find themselves in multiple flings throughout the novel.

Once Teppis meets O'Shaugnessy, he is immediately struck by the former pilot's story and urges Munshin to offer O'Shaugnessy twenty thousand dollars for the rights to it. O'Shaugnessy declines the offer because he does not want to sell his life story to be made into a cheap Hollywood flick. However, he runs out of money with his girlfriend Lulu Myers in Las Vegas and takes up jobs to raise cheap amount of money, but soon loses Lulu to Tony Tanner after she confesses she had sex with him in an phonebooth. Everyone returns to the capital but then O'Shaugnessy wonders into Mexico where after having an affair with a Mexican lady, becomes an bullfighter then returns to America where he purses writing. While Elena marries Eitel who is having an affair with the married Lulu despite her missing O'Shaugnessy.

== Main characters ==
Sergius O'Shaugnessy: Standing at six-feet one with blonde hair and blue eyes, O'Shaugnessy is the novel's protagonist and narrator. As an orphan, O'Shaugnessy's past is relatively uneventful until he joined the Air Force and became a fighter pilot. In Desert D’Or, O'Shaugnessy can initially fool his Hollywood friends, claiming that he was the son of a wealthy businessman. During the novel, O'Shaugnessy falls in love with the glamorous Hollywood actress, Lulu Meyers. The couple dates for an extended time before moves back to the capital to work on another film. Charles Eitel, the once-famous but blacklisted director, is O'Shaugnessy's closest and most trusted friend throughout the novel until Eitel moves back to the capital after clearing his name from the Subversive Committee. O'Shaugnessy desperately wants to become a writer, and even turns down lucrative acting and movie deals about his life. He claims that he does not want to sell his life story to turn into another “slob movie.” Secretly, O'Shaugnessy wants to be a writer. After he runs out of money, O'Shaugnessy wanders from Mexico to New York, taking odd jobs along the way and eventually opening a bullfighting class in New York City.

Charles Frances Eitel: Charles Eitel was a once rich and famous Hollywood director that was eventually blacklisted when he was linked to communist organizations. After Eitel did not cooperate with the Subversive Committee, Supreme Pictures blacklisted him. Once he lost his job, Eitel moved from the capital to his property in Desert D’Or. Throughout the novel, Eitel struggles with his confidence and desperately wants to write a meaningful script, but lacks the motivation. His relationship with Esposito serves as a spark for his creative writing, and he then cuts a deal with Collie Munshin to sell his script. However, Eitel pities Esposito and believes that the only way to break up with her is by formal marriage and divorce. However, they split before they get married. At the end of the novel, he is reunited with Esposito, and they eventually marry – though he remains unfaithful. Once Eitel cooperates with the committee, his glory is restored, and he becomes a successful Hollywood director once again.

Herman Teppis: Herman Teppis, head of Supreme Studios, is described as a “tall heavy man with silver hair and a red complexion.” Teppis is the stereotypical big-time Hollywood studio bully who has his actors and actresses on a leash. He alone can make or break a career, as Teppis quickly shunned Eitel after he was uncooperative. He urges Lulu to marry Teddy Pope, even though Teppis knows that Teddy is a homosexual. Despite that fact, Teppis cares more about making his actors famous and pressures them to consider marriage. In addition to bullying his renowned movie stars, he also takes advantage of the aspiring actresses. Towards the end of the novel, Teppis has sexual relations with a young aspiring actress and alludes to a promotion if she does what he wants.

Elena Esposito: Elena Esposito finds herself in Desert D’Or after being taken there by Munshin during their break-up. Almost immediately after, she starts dating Eitel. Their relationship helps bring fire back into Eitel's work, and the two live together for an extended period. A former cheap flamenco dancer, Esposito is admired and pitied by many of the men in Desert D’Or. Eitel thinks that the only way he can break up with Esposito without ruining her is to marry her and then file divorce shortly after. In addition to Eitel and Munshin, Marion Faye also is in love with Esposito, and the pair lives together for a short time after Esposito leaves Eitel. After a car wreck with Faye, Esposito and Eitel reunite and eventually get married.

Lulu Meyers: The most famous movie star in the novel, Lulu Meyers is sought out by many men in Desert D’Or, but falls in love with O'Shaugnessy. Years ago, Meyers and Eitel were married before they ultimately divorced. The actress is blonde and beautiful, and although already famous, is aspiring to become the most popular actress in America. Her relationship with O'Shaugnessy lasts for the majority of the novel, but she quickly moves on once she is back in the capital. She marries Tony Tanner, another Hollywood star, though she is unhappy with her marriage and ultimately has a steady affair with Eitel.

Collie Munshin: The son-in-law of Herman Teppis, Collie Munshin is one of the most talented producers in the capital. Eitel describes Munshin as “clever,” “tenacious,” and “scheming, ” with “short turned-up features” that made him look like a clown. Before becoming a movie producer, Munshin was previously a salesman, newspaperman, radio announcer, press-relations consultant, and an actor's agent. Although Munshin is married to Teppis's daughter, he is introduced in the story in the middle of a break-up with another woman, Elena Esposito, the girl whom Eitel then falls in love with and marries. Munshin eventually helps Eitel get back into directing after offering him a contract for his new script. At the end of the story, Eitel regards Munshin as a true friend – Munshin plays the best man at Eitel and Elena's wedding.

Dorothea O’Faye: A former personality who had been an actress, night club-singer, and gossip columnist, Dorothea O’Faye hosted many parties at her home, The Hangover, where O'Shaugnessy first met friends in Desert D’Or. Dorothea is described as generous and “handsome with a full body and exciting black hair” and notorious for having been “everywhere and done everything, and knew everything there was to know.” At an early age, O’Faye had an affair with a European prince and gave birth to his illegitimate son, Marion. Dorothea plays a significant role at the start of the novel, but her presence diminishes as the story progresses.

Marion Faye: Son of Dorothea O’Faye, Marion Faye dropped the “O” from his last name at a young age. At twenty-four years old, Marion is described as “very special” with a high level of intelligence and “light wavy hair and clear gray eyes.” After not finding a job that interested him, Faye started his own small-time escort service. Faye is well-connected with people of all types in Desert D’Or – everyone from businessmen and entertainers, to gamblers and golfers from the capital. Faye eventually dates Elena after Eitel, but they get into a severe car accident that put him into a coma.

== Stage version ==
Norman Mailer adapted the novel into a play. It opened Off-Broadway at the Theatre de Lys (now the Lucille Lortel Theatre) on Christopher St. in Greenwich Village on January 31, 1967. The play closed on May 21, 1967, after 128 performances. "The Deer Park" was directed by Leo Garen and starred Rip Torn, Marsha Mason, Mailer's former brother-in-law Mickey Knox, and Mailer's third wife, Beverly Bentley. Torn won an Obie Award for his performance.

== External Sources ==
- Guide to Norman Mailer. Manuscript of The Deer Park 1955 at the University of Chicago Special Collections Research Center
