= An American Dream (novel) =

1965 novel by Norman Mailer

- Cover of the first edition
- Author: Norman Mailer
- Cover artist: Paul Bacon
- Language: English
- Publisher: Dial Press
- Publication date: March 15, 1965
- Publication place: United States
- Media type: Print (Hardcover)
- Pages: 270

An American Dream is a 1965 novel by American author Norman Mailer. It was published by Dial Press. Mailer wrote it in serialized form for Esquire, consciously attempting to resurrect the methodology used by Charles Dickens and other earlier novelists, with Mailer writing each chapter against monthly deadlines. The book is written in a poetic style heavy with metaphor that creates unique and hypnotising narrative and dialogue. The novel's action takes place over 32 hours in the life of its protagonist Stephen Rojack. Rojack is a decorated war-hero, former congressman, talk-show host, and university professor. He is depicted as the metaphorical embodiment of the American Dream.

== Background ==
In 1963, Mailer wrote two regular columns: one on religion called "Responses and Reactions" for Commentary and one called "Big Bite" for Esquire. Mailer also divorced from his third wife Jeanne Campbell and met Beverly Bentley who would become his fourth wife. Bentley had known Hemingway in Spain and briefly dated Miles Davis in New York before she met Mailer. Bentley and Mailer took a long car trip, notably visited an army buddy "Fig" Gwaltney in Arkansas, viewed an autopsy of a cancer victim, watched the Sonny Liston and Floyd Patterson rematch in Las Vegas, and spent time with the Beats in San Francisco. While in San Francisco, Mailer "walked narrow ledges, testing his nerve and balance". They spent several days in Georgia with Bentley's family, and returned to New York in August, with Bentley several months pregnant. Mailer officially divorced Campbell, after he and Bentley were married. These experiences, states Lennon, are reflected in An American Dream which Mailer began in September.

Mailer's has similarities with Rojack: They both attended Harvard, served in World War II, had an interest in political office, and appeared on talk shows. Mailer seems to have drawn on his stabbing his second wife Adele Morales in Rojack's murdering of his wife Deborah. Mailer did not deny these similarities, but stated:

Rojack is still considerably different from me — he's more elegant, more witty, more heroic, his physical strength is considerable, and at the same time he's more corrupt than me. I wanted to create a man who was larger than myself yet somewhat less successful. That way, ideally, his psychic density, if I may use a private phrase, would be equal to mine — and so I could write from within his head with comfort. (Note: Quoted in Lennon (2004, p. 8).)

After a cross-country trip and having little success with his "big novel", Mailer approached the editor of Esquire with an idea that would make him produce a short novel: He would write eight 10,000-word installments that would run from January to August 1964. The editor agreed, and Mailer announced the novel in his last "Big Bite" column.

== Major characters ==
- Stephen Rojack: The novel's protagonist, a WWII hero, politician, academic, and public figure, Rojack experiences an existential crisis early in the novel.
- Deborah Kelly: Stephen Rojack's wife and daughter of Barney Kelly.
- Cherry: Shago's girlfriend with ties to organized crime, Cherry becomes Rojack's love interest.
- Barney Kelly: The father of Deborah Kelly
- Shago Martin: A jazz musician and Cherry's boyfriend.
- Roberts: A police detective who interrogates Rojack.
- Ruta: Deborah’s maid and Kelly's spy.

== Synopsis ==
In an alcoholic rage, Rojack murders his estranged wife, a high society woman, and descends into a lurid underworld of Manhattan jazz clubs, bars, and Mafia intrigue after meeting Cherry Melanie, a night-club singer and the girlfriend of a highly placed mobster. Rojack makes the death appear as a suicide, and maintains his innocence no matter how intense the scrutiny or severe the consequences. Rojack feels liberated by the violence and imagines himself receiving messages from the Moon, perceiving voices that command him to deny his guilt. In the course of the next twenty four hours, Rojack sets his focus against the New York City Police Department, the intimidation of an erratic black entertainer who draws a knife on him, and the gathered political clout of his dead wife's father, Barney Oswald Kelly, who suggests that higher political sources have an interest in Rojack's fate.

== Chapter summaries ==
=== The Harbours of the Moon ===
Rojack vomits over the balcony at a party and considers suicide. He leaves the party and calls his estranged wife Deborah, going to her house after she invites him. Ruta, the maid, lets him in. He notices that Deborah has been drinking. She belittles him in his time of need, and he strangles her on the floor.

=== A Runner from the Gaming Room ===
Rojack has sex with Ruta in her room. He then returns to Deborah's room, cleans up the evidence of murder, then throws her over the balcony making her death appear as a suicide. He tells Ruta that Mrs. Rojack killed herself.

=== A Messenger from the Maniac ===
Rojack asks Ruta to tell the cops nothing about their encounter. He runs to the street and sees Cherry Melanie, the night club singer, for the first time. He meets Detective Roberts at the scene of the "suicide." Depicted is Deborah's body smashed from impact and hit by a car. They go back upstairs, and Rojack fabricates a story about Deborah having cancer as the cause of her suicide. The police insist that Rojack come downtown for questioning. They meet Lt. Leznicki on the way out. Leznicki and O'Brien badger Rojack on the way to the police department. Rojack learns that one of the cars in the pile-up caused by Deborah was Eddie Ganucci, a mob boss wanted on a subpoena. Later Rojack sees Cherry again. He is drawn to her. It turns out that Deborah actually did have cancer so they release Rojack. Rojack goes to the club where Cherry performs in Greenwich Village.

=== Green Circles of Exhaustion ===
Rojack sits at the bar drinking and listening to Cherry perform. He joins Cherry and her "friends" for a drink, verbally sparring with her "date" Romeo. She and Rojack flirt and kiss; Rojack gets a call from Roberts who warns him to leave. He has an encounter with Tony, who orders Cherry to sing another set. She sings a hymn so Tony fires her. She leaves with Rojack, they get breakfast, and she invites him to a special place.

=== A Catenary of Manners ===
The special place is Cherry's post-mortem sister's old apartment. They have sex, and Rojack realizes he has fallen in love with her. He returns to his apartment in the afternoon and talks with Arthur who informs Rojack that Rojack's television show has been cancelled. He then speaks with Dr. Tharchman who tells Rojack that he must take leave from the college. When later talking to Bettina Gigot he picks up on a hint regarding Deborah concerning her father and daughter. Rojack then meets Roberts at the police station who presents him with three pieces of evidence that seem to implicate Rojack. Roberts presses him for a confession. Rojack refuses and is cleared of wrongdoing. Rojack goes back to Cherry and they make love.

=== A Vision in the Desert ===
Rojack and Cherry talk a bit about Rojack's TV show. Then, Cherry tells her life-story: her dead parents; her brother's incest; "Daddy Warbucks" who turns out to be Kelly; her escape from Vegas; her relationships; her two abortions, one with Kelly and one with a man named Shago; her finally having a vaginal orgasm with Rojack; and her premonition of death soon after. Shago appears at the chapter's end and tells Rojack to leave.

=== A Votive Is Prepared ===
Rojack and Shago fight. Rojack gets the upper hand and throws Shago down the stairs.

=== At the Lion and the Serpent ===
Rojack goes to the Waldorf Tower to confront Kelly. Rojack talks with Ruta and Deirdre before eating with Kelly. Rojack confesses to the murder of Deborah, then walks the parapet around the roof of the building, hitting Kelly with Shago's umbrella before escaping. He returns to Cherry's only to find out from Roberts she has been killed.

=== At the Harbors of the Moon Again (Epilogue) ===
Rojack travels to Las Vegas where he wins big at the tables, paying off all his debts. He imagines speaking with Cherry in Heaven before he heads south to Guatemala and the Yucatán.

== Style ==
The style of An American Dream seemed to grow organically from Mailer's "Big Bite" columns for Esquire. His voice, explains Rollyson, is a "supple first-person" persona "punctuated with feisty asides and comic exaggerations". An American Dream is narrated by Stephen Richards Rojack, the novel's protagonist, in "an edgy, rococo style" that shows Mailer at the height of his narrative powers. Andrew Gordon points out that the events of the novel unfold at a quick pace, compared to Mailer's prior works, writing "before we are five pages into the novel, Rojack has killed four Germans in a grotesque and graphically violent scene. By the end of thirty pages, Rojack has murdered his wife". Gordon finds that Mailer tempers the shock of An American Dream's violence by using a combination of flashback sequences, playful, heavily stylized language, and an abundance of mythical, fairy tale imagery to evoke an exaggerated, dreamlike psychological fantasy.

While Kaufmann likens Mailer's narrative to a medieval allegory in its emphasis on magic and metaphysics, Rollyson suggests it embodies an Elizabethan baroqueness and shows Mailer at his best as a novelist. Kaufmann avers that Mailer borrowed his guiding principle from Marx: "quantity changes quality". Mailer blends modern America with Rojack's dream visions, making his narrative akin to the magician's stage show in writing a "novelist as magician who writes a book filled with effects without any causes". Even though Mailer himself said he had the intention of writing a realistic novel, his style suggests otherwise. An American Dream is like something out of Chaucer or Dante, or out of American romance, or that the events created by Rojack do not represent literal occurrences that readers come to expect in a novel. Still, argues Merrill, one cannot dismiss Mailer's serious intentions.

Barry H. Leeds, in his Enduring Vision of Norman Mailer, suggests two primary structural patterns: one is Rojack's pilgrimage from "damnation and madness to salvation and sanity" and the other is the geometrical sexual connections shared by the characters.

== Analysis ==
Dearborn calls Rojack the "quintessential Mailer hero" as he exemplifies many of the traits and accomplishments Mailer himself as a war hero, a successful politician, a television personality, and a professor of "existential psychology". Mailer commented in a later New York Post interview: "I wanted a man who was very much of my generation and generally of my type". Rojack feels that his reality is created by the public and that he has become just a shell, a mere actor, which creates a crisis of identity and precipitates his actions. Like Mailer's Hipster, Rojack does not live until he has experienced death — so his murder of Deborah frees him from his hollow public life and initiates his transformation. It's only through the lowest and most severe forms of physical transgression that Rojack, like Mailer's Hipster is able to begin his journey toward psychic redemption. Rojack's journey reflects a seminal theme for Mailer in the importance of growth by confronting serious existential situations with courage. In a 1963 letter, Mailer defines what he means by "existentialism" as "that character can dissolve in one stricken event and re-form in startling new fashion".

Likewise, states Dearborn, Rojack believes that in killing Deborah, he has cured himself of cancer, a theme that becomes explicit in the novel's epilogue where "Cancer is the growth of madness denied". In a later interview with High Times, Mailer elaborates further noting "A lot of people get cancer because they were too responsible with their lives. They led lives that were more responsible then they wanted to be. They lived their lives for others more than for themselves. Denied themselves certain fundamental things, whatever they were. . . . Cancer is a revolution of the cells". Leeds adds that, for Mailer, cancer represents moral failure and is a significant theme in much of Mailer's work.

It is not easy to accept or to excuse Rojack's ability to escape punishment for his transgression of murder. Often characters cannot so easily get away with murder unless it stems from revenge. Murderer's gambit, whose success requires the approval of the reader, can be applied as a way for the "novelist to gamble with the reader's empathy in the hopes of either winning greater sympathy or . . . greater interest in the character's situation". Yet, there must contain more strategical tactics in order to win over the jury. For example, when Rojack murders his wife, he compares it to the killing of the Germans. The juxtaposition poses the question of what is the difference between killing a person in wartime and killing a person in society? Mailer also hints that the narrative is "framed" by a dream cloud through the use of the novel's name An American Dream and the allusion of F. Scott Fitzgerald's story "A Diamond as Big as the Ritz".

An American Dream was controversial for its portrayal and treatment of women, and was critiqued by Kate Millett in Sexual Politics. Millett sees Rojack as another incarnation of a Mailer protagonist who becomes heroic through the linking of sex and violence. Mailer, she argues, attempts to use existentialism to excuse Rojack's misogynistic exploration as his "sexistentialist project". Rojack's victims are women and a black man, appropriate objects of the white male's "dominant wrath". Millett chastises Rojack, and by proxy Mailer, for what she assesses as the feigned pretense of radically progressive beliefs that belie his defiant sense of white male privilege, likening him to an old southern Confederate, pretending nobility while lashing out at the encroachment of true progress. Millett notes that "Rojack belongs to the oldest ruling class in the world, and like one of Faulkner's ancient retainers of a lost cause, he is making his stand on the preservation of a social hierarchy that sees itself as threatened with extinction. His partial Jewish ancestry and his 'liberal' views to the contrary, Rojack is the last surviving white man as conquering hero".

Millett criticizes Mailer for being almost wholly unique among prominent authors in championing a character who is a murderer, while allowing the offender to escape any accountability for his crimes:

The humanist convictions which underlie Crime and Punishment (the original and still the greatest study in what it is like to commit murder), may all go by the board. Both Dostoyevsky and Dreiser, in An American Tragedy gradually created in their murderers an acceptance of responsibility for the violation of life which their actions constituted, and both transcend their crimes through atonement. Rojack has some singularity in being one of the first literary characters to get away with murder; he is surely the first hero as homicide to rejoice in his crime and never really lose his creator's support.

Likewise, Judith Fetterley criticizes Mailer's treatment of women by his male characters in pointing out that each female character must meet a violent death in order for Mailer's hero to be "free". Although power might lay in the masculine hands of those in government and big business, women have a mystical power over men. This power enacts a control over Rojack and only when Rojack rids himself of Deborah does he feel in possession of himself.

American culture, Justin Shaw states, has a tradition in which society expects men to achieve the "self-made mode of masculinity". Betty Friedan writes in The Feminine Mystique that men, in other words, were not enemies but "fellow victims" of society's expected and assigned gender roles. His wife's recognition of Rojack in the existing world is shown to have been the link to his masculinity which left him "a void where his sense of masculinity resided" when she tells him that she no longer loves him. Rojack then begins his search for an active subject role in a masculine role.

Maggie McKinley argues that Mailer uses "violence as a literary device that facilitates an analysis of his philosophies surrounding existential freedoms, social oppression, and gendered relationships". Rojack's violence is not just a result of his masculinity, but from chasing the "sexual freedom that is often denied by a repressive or 'cancerous' society". Violence provides a centre for Rojack's "construction of a liberated masculinity": "Rojack seems able to discuss manhood only through the language of violence", specifically addressing his view that masculinity revolves around either the repression or embrace of violence.

Robert Merrill posits that An American Dream seems to suggest violence "is not an intolerable aberration but an extreme example of life's essential irrationality".

== Publication ==
An American Dream was first published as an eight-part serial in Esquire, January–August 1964. Mailer announced the serial in his final "Big Bite" column, making clear that his serial will distinguish itself from other authors. Mailer writes: "It's been a long time since anything of this sort has been tried by an author who takes himself seriously"; Mailer cited Dickens and Dostoyevsky as inspiration. While the serialization proved a challenge for Mailer he writes that the process "has me more or less pissing blood." Esquire's circulation increased to 900,000 during the serial's first month.

Mailer rewrote 40% of the scenes for the novel's release in book form. Dial Press published the book in hardcover, and Dell published the paperback. The novel was edited for book publication by E.L. Doctorow.

== Reception ==
An American Dream sold well and spent six weeks on The New York Times Best Seller list, reaching number eight in April 1965.

The reviews for An American Dream were polarized, with very few mixed. Conventional wisdom was that the novel was one of Mailer's lesser works of fiction. While critics like Granville Hicks, Philip Rahv, Roger Shattuck, Stanley Edgar Hyman, Elizabeth Hardwick, and Tom Wolfe called An American Dream a failure, the novel has strong defenders, notably critics Leo Bersani, Richard Rhodes, Paul Pickrel, Richard Poirier, and Barry H. Leeds.

Writing one of the first and most positive reviews in Life, John Aldridge stated that An American Dream "transcends the conventional limits of blasphemy to expose the struggle toward psychic redemption which is the daily warfare of our hidden outlaw selves". In Vogue, Joan Didion called An American Dream "the only serious New York novel since The Great Gatsby". Conrad Knickerbocker writes in The New York Times that Mailer "is one of the few really interesting writers anywhere", and that An American Dream "defines the American style by presenting the most extreme of our realities — murder, love and spirit strangulated, the corruption of power and the powerful, the sacrifice of self to image, all of it mix mastered in booze and heat-and-serve sex, giving off the smell of burning rubber to the sound of sirens". Since 1965, An American Dream has been defended by Mailer's critics, some of which call it one of his better novels. Tony Tanner posits that a few critics likely found An American Dream to be "outrageous" due to their perception of it as a simple narrative and not as a surrealist work. Tanner hailed Leo Bersani's review of An American Dream as a "brilliant comment on the novel as a whole" because Bersani recognized the purposeful "exuberance" that Mailer used.

Stanley Edgar Hyman describes An American Dream as a dreadful novel and says it's the worst that he has read in years. He calls the novel pretentious and focuses his critique on what he sees as the flaws in the plot, images, and the tropes.

== Film adaptation ==
An American Dream was adapted for film in 1966 starring Stuart Whitman as Stephen Rojack, Eleanor Parker as his wife, and Janet Leigh as Cherry McMahon. Johnny Mandel (music) and Paul Francis Webster (lyrics) were nominated for an Academy Award for Best Original Song for "A Time for Love." The film also is known as See You in Hell, Darling.
