= The Castle in the Forest =

2007 novel by Norman Mailer

- Cover of the first edition
- Author: Norman Mailer
- Language: English
- Genre: Historical fiction; supernatural fiction
- Publisher: Random House
- Publication date: 2007
- Publication place: United States
- Media type: Print
- Pages: 465
- ISBN: 978-0-8129-7849-0
- OCLC: 179698757

The Castle in the Forest is the last novel by writer Norman Mailer, published in the year of his death, 2007. It is the story of Adolf Hitler's childhood as seen through the eyes of Dieter, a demon sent to put him on his destructive path. The novel explores the idea that Hitler was the product of incest. It forms a thematic contrast with the writer's immediately previous novel The Gospel According to the Son (1999), which deals with the early life of Jesus. It received a good deal of praise, including a glowing review from Lee Siegel of The New York Times Book Review, and was a New York Times Bestseller in 2007.

== Structure ==
The novel is divided into 15 books, organized initially into a summary of the findings of the SS officer tasked with investigating Hitler's ancestry, and developing into a chart of Hitler's young life. It begins with a portrait of his father and mother, followed by a book on the narrator, and then follows Hitler's life before ending with an epilogue entitled the Castle in the Forest where the narrator is interviewed by a US Army psychiatrist at the end of the war. The 15 books are:

1. The Search for Hitler's Grandfather
2. Adolf's Father
3. Adolf's Mother
4. The Intelligence Officer
5. The Family
6. The Farm
7. Der Alte and the Bees
8. The Coronation of Nicholas II
9. Alois Junior
10. To Honor and to Fear
11. The Abbot and the Blacksmith
12. Edmund, Alois and Adolf
13. Alois and Adolf
14. Adolf and Klara
15. The Castle in the Forest

== Plot summary ==
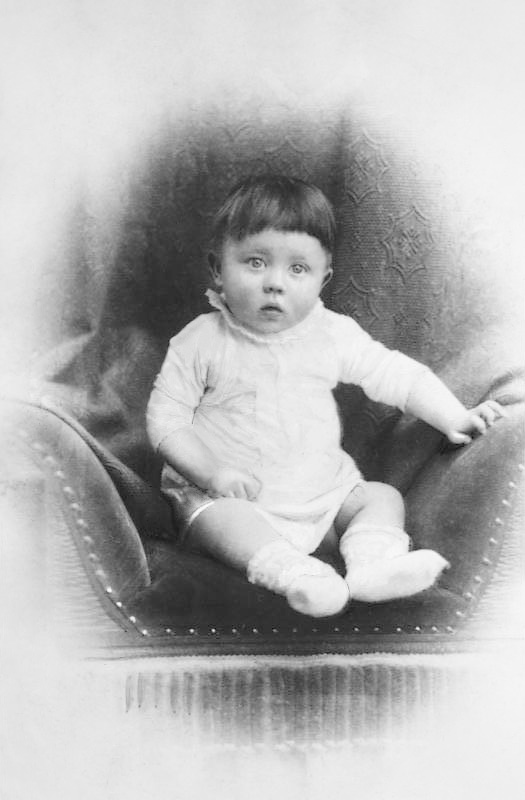
The novel charts Hitler's childhood from the point of view of his satanic caretaker

The Castle in the Forest tells the story of the young life of Adolf Hitler, his origins and his immediate family tree, through the eyes of what at first is portrayed as a young SS officer researching Hitler's genealogy at the behest of Heinrich Himmler, who opens the novel speaking to SS officers about the importance of strong traits that result through incest. The SS Officer, who initially instructs the reader to remember him as Dieter, reminds the reader of the penalty he would suffer from the Nazi Party should his writings become public knowledge. He proceeds to describe his search for Hitler's grandparents, to both detect any presence of Jewish ancestry and to ascertain whether Hitler was the product of incest. The story follows Hitler's father, Alois Hitler, his upbringing in a rural area of Austria, and his early marriages and work for the customs department of the Austrian government. Following two marriages and a number of affairs, Alois marries a relative, either his niece or his daughter, Klara, and the couple have three children who survive past childhood, the third of these being Hitler, who is referred to by Mailer as Adi.

At this point, Dieter reveals himself to be an employee of Satan, instructed by his superiors to oversee the development of Hitler for possible use by the devil in the future. Dieter states that he had occupied the body of an SS officer when he chose to write his story, maintaining that, should Satan trace the work back to Dieter himself, he would be punished. Dieter follows Hitler through Austria, charting his development and taking a more active role as Hitler discovers wargames around the age of five, and witnesses the beating of the family dog which has a profound effect on him. At this point, Alois retires and the family move to a rural farm.

== Reception ==
Reaction to the book was generally positive. The New York Observer called it a "blackly hilarious, beautifully written book" while Entertainment Weekly wrote that it was "terrifically creepy... an icy and convincing portrait of the dictator as a young sociopath". The Boston Globe wrote that the novel was "saturated with a very material sense of evil: The moods, textures, auras and above all the smells that announce the entrance of the Devil into earthly affairs."

== Awards and nominations ==
The book was a New York Times Bestseller in 2007, and won the 2007 Bad Sex in Fiction Award from the London literary journal Literary Review.
