= Lawrence Schiller =

American producer, director, and screenwriter (born 1936)

- Born: December 28, 1936 (age 89); New York City, New York
- Occupations: Photojournalist; producer; director; screenwriter
- Years active: 1958 - present

Lawrence Julian Schiller (born December 28, 1936) is an American photojournalist, film producer, director and screenwriter. As of 2026, he is the last living professional photographer who worked with Marilyn Monroe.

== Career ==
Schiller was born in 1936 in Brooklyn to Jewish parents and grew up outside of San Diego, California. After attending Pepperdine College in Los Angeles, he worked for Life magazine, Paris Match, The Sunday Times, Time, Newsweek, Stern, and The Saturday Evening Post as a freelance photojournalist.

Schiller's best known work as a photographer are the sessions he took with Marilyn Monroe in the early 1960s. Schiller first photographed Monroe in May 1960 on the set of Let’s Make Love, and then again in 1962 when he was hired to photograph the star on the set of what would become the last film she would ever work on, the unfinished Something’s Got To Give. His photos of her have been showcased in art exhibitions and his 2015 book Marilyn & Me.

Schiller has published 17 books, starting with LSD in 1966. Other notable books he has collaborated on include W. Eugene Smith's book Minamata, and Norman Mailer's Marilyn, The Executioner's Song, and Oswald's Tale. Having produced and directed the 1967 Capitol Records audio documentary album Why Did Lenny Bruce Die?, he also collaborated with Albert Goldman on Ladies and Gentleman--Lenny Bruce!! in 1974. He has also written books independently, including American Tragedy, Perfect Murder, Perfect Town, Cape May Court House, and Into the Mirror.

He has directed seven motion pictures and miniseries for television; The Executioner's Song and Peter the Great won five Emmys. American Tragedy, Perfect Murder, Perfect Town and Into the Mirror were made into television mini-series for CBS, all of which Schiller produced and directed.

Following the June 12, 1994 stabbing deaths of O.J Simpson's ex-wife Nicole Brown Simpson and her friend Ron Goldman, Schiller collaborated with Simpson, who was in jail awaiting his famous murder trial at the time, on a book called I Want to Tell You, which was billed as the former football star answering questions from fans about his life and the incident. Following Simpson's acquittal on murder charges, Schiller and former Time magazine journalist Jim Willwerth co-wrote American Tragedy: The Uncensored Story of the Simpson Defense, considered one of the best books about the case. Dan Whitcomb, who covered the sensational trial for Reuters, worked for Schiller as a researcher on the book.

In 1999 Schiller published a book on the JonBenet Ramsey murder case, Perfect Murder, Perfect Town: The Uncensored Story of the JonBenet Murder and the Grand Jury's Search for the Final Truth, based on an article he had published in The New Yorker on the same subject.

In 2008, after the death of the writer Norman Mailer, he was named Senior Advisor to the Norman Mailer Estate, and served on the executive board of the Norman Mailer Society. Schiller and Mailer were close friends and frequent collaborators.

Schiller served as a consultant to political campaigns and major corporations on such issues as crisis management, branding, public imaging and the use of social networking. Schiller has been an on-air analyst to NBC news, a consultant to Taschen Publishing, The John F. Kennedy Library and Foundation, The Ray Bradbury Estate, Mitsubishi Power Systems Americas, Photographers Annie Leibovitz Studio and Steven Klein and has written for The New Yorker, The Daily Beast and other publications.

In 2005, Schiller traveled to China and over two years built a collection of Chinese contemporary art, which numbered over 80 paintings and photographs. In 2017 Schiller curated the John F. Kennedy Centennial for the Smithsonian American Art Museum in Washington, D.C., and the New York Historical Society in New York City. He also represented the Jacques Lowe Estate of historical photographs of the Kennedy family and the Lisl Steiner photographic archives. In 2018 he curated the Robert Kennedy - Martin Luther King, Jr. exhibition for the New York Historical Society. He also managed the 2020 Centennial of Ray Bradbury.

Schiller resides in Sherman Oaks, California with his wife Nina Wiener, the Editor in Chief of publications at the Getty Museum in Los Angeles.

== Works ==
=== Filmography ===
- Double Jeopardy (1992) Producer/Director
- I Love My Friends (1985 Kris Kardashian music video) Director
- The Man Who Skied Down Everest (1975 documentary) USA Director
- Lenny (1974) Material supplier
- Soon There Will Be No More Me (1972 documentary) Producer/Director
- Lady Sings The Blues (1972) Titles/Still montage director
- The American Dreamer (1971 documentary) Producer/Co-director/Writer
- The Lexington Experience (1971 documentary) Producer/Director
- Butch Cassidy and the Sundance Kid (1969) Still montage director

=== Books ===
Books – as author or in collaboration with:

- LSD (WS Press, 2023) Commemorative Edition by Richard Alpert aka Ram Dass, Sidney Cohen and Lawrence Schiller
- All of Me Is Illustrated (RosettaBooks/Inked 2020) With stories by Ray Bradbury, tattoos by today's artists. Conceived and directed by Lawrence Schiller
- The Fire Next Time (Taschen Books 2018) By James Baldwin with photos by Steve Schapiro and conceived by Lawrence Schiller
- The Promise and the Dream, The Untold Story of MLK and RFK (RosettaBooks 2018) By David Margolick and produced by Lawrence Schiller
- Electric Kool Aid Acid Test (Taschen 2017) By Tom Wolfe and photos by Lawrence Schiller
- JFK: A Vision for America (HarperCollins 2017) Produced by Lawrence Schiller, Edited by Stephen Kennedy Smith & Douglas Brinkley
- Around the World in 125 Years (Taschen/National Geographic 2017) Photos by various photographers and conceived by Lawrence Schiller
- Barbra Streisand (Taschen Books 2014) by Steve Schapiro & Lawrence Schiller
- Marilyn & Me, A Photographer's Memories (Nan A. Talese/Doubleday 2012) by Lawrence Schiller
- Superman Comes to the Supermarket (Taschen Books 2012) By Norman Mailer with various photographers and conceived by Lawrence Schiller
- Moonfire (Taschen Books 2009) By Norman Mailer with various photographers and conceived by Lawrence Schiller
- Into the Mirror: The Life of Master Spy Robert P. Hanssen (HarperCollins 2002) by Lawrence Schiller
- Cape May Court House: A Death in the Night (HarperCollins 2002) by Lawrence Schiller
- Perfect Murder, Perfect Town: JonBenet and the City of Boulder (HarperCollins 1999) by Lawrence Schiller
- American Tragedy: The Uncensored Story of the Simpson Defense (Random House 1996) by Lawrence Schiller and James Willwerth
- I Want to Tell You – My Response to Your Letters, Your Messages, Your Questions (Little Brown 1995) by O. J. Simpson with Lawrence Schiller
- Oswald's Tale: An American Mystery (Random House 1996) by Norman Mailer
- The Executioner's Song (Hutchinson & Co. 1979) by Norman Mailer
- The Faith of Graffiti (HarperCollins 2009) by Norman Mailer and Jon Naar
- Marilyn: A Biography (Grosset and Dunlap 1973) by Norman Mailer and the world's foremost photographers
- Ladies and Gentlemen Lenny Bruce!! (Random House 1974) by Albert Goldman and Lawrence Schiller
- The Killing of Sharon Tate (New American Library 1970) by Susan Atkins and Lawrence Schiller
- LSD (New American Library 1966) by Richard Alpert, Sidney Cohen and Lawrence Schiller

=== Television ===
- Dead Man Talking The Gary Gilmore story, (Reelz Network) Executive Producer
- Overkill The JonBenet Story (Reelz Network) Executive Producer
- The Secret Tapes of the O. J. Case: The Untold Story, O. J. Speaks: The Hidden Tapes (LMN & A&E Networks, 2015) Executive Producer
- JonBenet: Anatomy of a Cold Case (Court TV, 2006) Executive Producer/Director
- Trace Evidence: The Case Files of Dr. Henry Lee (Court TV, 2004, 2005) Executive Producer/Director
- Master Spy: The Robert Hanssen Story (CBS, 2002) Producer/Director
- American Tragedy (CBS, 2000) Producer/Director/Writer (based on Schiller's book American Tragedy)
- Perfect Murder, Perfect Town (CBS, 2000) Producer/Director (based on Schiller's book Perfect Murder, Perfect Town)
- The Plot to Kill Hitler (Warner Bros./CBS, 1990) Director
- Double Exposure: The Story of Margaret Bourke-White (TNT, 1989) Producer/Director
- Peter the Great (NBC, 1986) Executive Producer/Co-director
  - Recipient of 3 Emmy Awards, Writers Guild of America Award
- The Executioner's Song (NBC, 1982) Producer/Director
  - Recipient of 2 Emmy Awards, Time Magazine, Best of the Year, Hollywood Reporter, Best of the Decade
- Murder: By Reason of Insanity (CBS, 1985) Producer
- Her Life as a Man (NBC, 1986) Executive Producer
- The Patricia Neal Story (CBS, 1982) Executive Producer
  - Recipient of 1 Emmy Award
- Child Bride of Short Creek (NBC, 1982) Co-Producer
- Marilyn, The Untold Story (ABC, 1980) Producer/Co-director
  - Recipient of 1 Emmy Award
- The Winds of Kitty Hawk (NBC, 1978) Producer/Flying sequences and montages director
- The Trial of Lee Harvey Oswald (ABC, 1976) Producer
- Hey, I'm Alive (ABC, 1975) Producer/Director

== Selected awards and recognitions ==
- Academy of Television Arts and Sciences Emmy Award Winner for Peter the Great
- The Christopher Award for The Patricia Neal Story
- Representative of the US in the USA/USSR bilateral talks in Moscow and Washington, drafted and signed treaties with the Government of the USSR
- Representative from the United States to the Moscow International Peace Forum
- Numerous National Press Photographers Association Photographic Awards
