= Marilyn: A Biography =

1973 book

- First edition
- Author: Norman Mailer
- Language: English
- Subject: Biography
- Genre: Non-fiction
- Published: 1973 Grosset and Dunlap
- Publication place: United States
- Pages: 272 pages
- ISBN: 978-0448010298 (hardcover)
- Preceded by: St. George and the Godfather
- Followed by: The Fight

Norman Mailer's 1973 biography of Marilyn Monroe (usually designated Marilyn: A Biography) (Note: The book is commonly referenced as Marilyn: A Biography, e.g. in Michael Lennon's Critical essays ... and an Oxford reference book. But that is a dubitable title. The display type on the title page begins with "Marilyn" on the top line, "a biography by" on another, and "Norman" and "Mailer" on two more.) was a large-format book of glamour photographs of Monroe for which Mailer supplied the text. Originally hired to write an introduction by Lawrence Schiller, who put the book package together, Mailer expanded the introduction into a long essay.

In the book's final chapter, Mailer expresses his belief that Monroe was murdered by agents of the FBI and CIA who resented her supposed affair with Robert F. Kennedy. In his own 1987 autobiography Timebends, the dramatist Arthur Miller, Monroe's last husband, wrote scathingly of Mailer: "[Mailer] was himself in drag, acting out his own Hollywood fantasies of fame and sex unlimited and power."

== Sources ==
Mailer used the biographies Marilyn Monroe (Maurice Zolotow, 1960), Marilyn: An Untold Story (Norman Rosten, 1967) and - Norma Jean: The life of Marilyn Monroe (Fred Lawrence Guiles, 1969) as sources.

== Reception ==
Critical reception was mixed. While the photographs were praised, critics gave Mailer's text a critical drubbing, particularly his assertion that government agents murdered Monroe.

In a 60 Minutes interview broadcast on 13 July 1973, Mailer asked his interlocutor Mike Wallace if he gave his thesis about Monroe's "murder" any credence. Wallace said he did not. Mailer admitted to Wallace that he wrote the book for money and that the Kennedy murder scenario made the book more salable.

The book sold more copies than any of his works except The Naked and the Dead. It remained in print for decades, but was out of print in the United States as of 2011.

Two later works that Mailer co-wrote presented imagined words and thoughts in Monroe's voice: the 1980 book Of Women and Their Elegance and the 1986 play Strawhead, which was produced off-Broadway starring his daughter Kate Mailer.

== See also ==
- Marilyn: Norma Jean (1988) by Gloria Steinem
