= Marilyn: Norma Jean =

Biography of Marilyn Monroe by Gloria Steinem

Marilyn: Norma Jeane
- First edition
- Author: Gloria Steinem (text); George Barris (photographs)
- Language: English
- Subject: Biography
- Genre: Non-fiction
- Publisher: Henry Holt & Co (hardcover); Signet (paperback)
- Publication date: 1988
- Publication place: United States
- Pages: 182 pages
- ISBN: 978-0805000603 (hardcover) 978-0451155962 (paperback)
- Preceded by: Outrageous Acts and Everyday Rebellions
- Followed by: Revolution from Within

Marilyn: Norma Jeane is a biography of Marilyn Monroe (born Norma Jeane Baker) by feminist Gloria Steinem. Published in 1988, the book features pictures by photographer George Barris and thus evokes Norman Mailer's 1973 controversial biography Marilyn that also essentially is a long essay on Monroe added to a book of photographs.

John Smothers, in his 1987 review in The Library Journal, wrote:

"Steinem admits that as a teenager she walked out on the movie Gentlemen Prefer Blondes because she was embarrassed at Monroe's performance/persona. Now admiring of her subject, Steinem spends little time on Monroe's films but instead concentrates on her personality, believing it, along with her appearance, to be responsible for her status as a cultural icon. Occasionally Steinem's prose is too purple, but for the most part the book serves well as an even-handed introduction to the Monroe phenomenon."

There was a hardcover reprint in 1997 but the book is now out of print.
