= The Executioner's Song (film) =

1982 film directed by Lawrence Schiller

- Genre: Biography; Drama; Crime
- Based on: The Executioner's Song by Norman Mailer
- Screenplay by: Norman Mailer
- Directed by: Lawrence Schiller
- Starring: Tommy Lee Jones; Christine Lahti; Rosanna Arquette; Eli Wallach
- Theme music composer: John Cacavas
- Countries of origin: United States; Sweden
- Original language: English

Production
- Producer: Lawrence Schiller
- Production locations: Provo, Utah; Salt Lake City; Utah State Federal Prison - Maximum Security, Salt Lake City; Utah State Supreme Court Chambers - 450 S. State, Salt Lake City, Utah; Orem, Utah
- Cinematography: Freddie Francis
- Editors: Richard A. Harris; Tom Rolf
- Running time: 188 minutes (U.S.); 136 minutes (European)
- Production company: Film Communications Inc.

Original release
- Network: NBC
- Release: November 28, 1982

The Executioner's Song is a 1982 American made-for-television biographical crime drama film. It is a film adaptation of Norman Mailer's 1979 Pulitzer Prize-winning novel of the same name. The film is directed by Lawrence Schiller from a screenplay by Mailer.

== Plot ==
The movie is about the final nine months of the life of Gary Gilmore, beginning with his release from prison at the age of 35 after serving 12 years for robbery in Indiana. He is allowed to fly to Utah to live with Brenda Nicol, a distant cousin who was close to him and agrees to sponsor him. She tries to help him get back to normal life, which he finds extremely difficult after being in prison for so long. He soon moves to live with his Uncle Vern, with whom he works in shoe repair, and Vern's wife. Gilmore next moves on to another job, at an insulation factory, where he performs well at first, but starts to have erratic hours and contentious relationships with co-workers.

Gilmore meets and becomes romantically involved with Nicole Baker, a 19-year-old young woman with two young children. Despite his efforts to reform himself, Gilmore begins to fight, steal items from stores, and abuse alcohol and drugs. The people who care for him are distressed to see these patterns re-emerge.

Nicole breaks up with Gilmore after he hits her, and she goes into hiding with her children. Gilmore soon murders two men in two separate robberies over two days. His cousin Brenda tells police she suspects Gilmore is involved, and he is taken into custody. He is convicted of one of the murders and sentenced to death under a state law designed to accommodate the US Supreme Court ruling on the death penalty, which found most state laws on capital punishment to constitute "cruel and unusual punishment," prohibited under the Constitution. States worked to revise their laws.

While his attorneys, the ACLU and his family try to persuade Gilmore to pursue more appeals, he argues to have the sentence carried out and becomes a national media sensation. Publishers and reporters vie to buy his story and film rights. The night before his death, family, friends and lawyers join Gilmore for a party on death row.

On January 17, 1977, Gilmore is executed by firing squad, as he chose. His body is then cremated after parts are extracted for donation in accordance with his wishes. He was the first person to be judicially executed in the United States after the execution of Luis Monge in Colorado on June 2, 1967.

== Cast ==
- Tommy Lee Jones as Gary Gilmore
- Christine Lahti as Brenda Nicol
- Rosanna Arquette as Nicole Baker
- Eli Wallach as Uncle Vern Damico
- Steven Keats as Larry Samuels
- Jordan Clarke as Johnny Nicol
- Richard Venture as Earl Dorius
- Jenny Wright as April Baker
- Walter Olkewicz as Pete Galovan
- Michael LeClair as Rikki Wood
- Pat Corley as Val Conlan
- Mary Ethel Gregory as Ida Damico
- John Dennis Johnston as Jimmy Poker-Game
- Norris Mailer as Lu-Ann (as Norris Church)
- Kenneth O'Brien as Spencer McGrath
- Rance Howard as Lt. Johnson
- Charles Cyphers as Noall Wootton
- Robert DeMotte as Garage Mechanic
- Jim Youngs as Sterling Baker
- Grace Zabriskie as Kathryne Baker

== Production ==
Mailer originally asked Lanford Wilson to adapt the story, but Wilson politely declined. It was originally produced as a two-part TV movie running a total of 188 minutes on November 28 and 29, 1982. Later it was re-edited in a 136-minute theatrical version for European distribution, with additions of scenes of violence and nudity. Parts of the film were shot at the Utah State Prison in Draper and the city of Provo, Utah.

== Reception ==
In what the New York Times described as a "searing performance," Tommy Lee Jones won an Emmy Award for his role in this work. Time Out- London said about the film's performances: "Jones (playing Gilmore) goes his own fascinating route to the loser's nirvana without recourse to psycho-style tics, while strong character performances from Arquette and Lahti constantly shift the focus back towards the everyday straitjacket of Utah underdogs." Roger Ebert and Gene Siskel recommended the film in a 1986 episode of their TV show devoted to overlooked movies that were available in a growing source of films in the U.S. at the time—video rental stores. They both advised viewers to seek out a version that was longer and released in European theatres, as it had restored a lot of material that was edited out when the film was shown on American TV in 1982.

== Remake ==
In November 2026, United Artists purchased rights to the film and plans to remake it with Jacob Elordi starring.
