= List of plays and musicals set in New York City =

This article lists plays and musicals set in New York City.

- Anna Christie (1921)
- The Hairy Ape (1922)
- Street Scene (1929)
- London Calling (1930)
- Design for Living (1933)
- Night of January 16th (1935)
- The Old Maid (1935)
- My Sister Eileen (1940)
- Arsenic and Old Lace (1941)
- On the Town (1944)
- The Iceman Cometh (1946)
- Death of a Salesman (1949)
- Bell, Book and Candle (1950)
- Guys and Dolls (1950)
- The Seven Year Itch (1952)
- Wonderful Town (1953)
- Saturday Night (1954)
- A View from the Bridge (1955)
- Auntie Mame (1956)
- West Side Story (1957)
- Two for the Seesaw (1958)
- The Zoo Story (1958)
- Fiorello! (1959)
- Do Re Mi (1960)
- Come Blow Your Horn (1961)
- Subways Are for Sleeping (1961)
- How to Succeed in Business Without Really Trying (1961)
- A Thousand Clowns (1962)
- Barefoot in the Park (1963)
- Enter Laughing (1963)
- Here's Love (1963)
- Funny Girl (1964)
- Hello, Dolly! (1964)
- The Subject Was Roses (1964)
- Balm in Gilead (1965)
- Cactus Flower (1965)
- The Odd Couple (1965)
- Skyscraper (1965)
- Mame (1966)
- Sweet Charity (1966)
- Wait Until Dark (1966)
- How Now, Dow Jones (1967)
- Love in E-Flat (1967)
- The Boys in the Band (1968)
- Hair (1968)
- Plaza Suite (1968)
- Promises, Promises (1968)
- Play It Again, Sam (1969)
- Applause (1970)
- Company (1970)
- Follies (1971)
- The Prisoner of Second Avenue (1971)
- The Sunshine Boys (1972)
- Seesaw (1973)
- A Chorus Line (1975)
- Checking Out (1976)
- Annie (1977)
- Chapter Two (1977)
- 42nd Street (1980)
- Little Shop of Horrors (1982)
- Strawhead (1982)
- Mama, I Want to Sing! (1983)
- Brighton Beach Memoirs (1983)
- Angels in America (1991)
- Falsettos (1992)
- My Favorite Year (1992)
- The Goodbye Girl (1993)
- Rent (1996)
- The Life (1997)
- Ragtime (1998)
- The Capeman (1998)
- Bright Lights, Big City (1999)
- Saturday Night Fever (1999)
- The Wild Party (2000)
- The Wild Party (2000)
- The Last Five Years (2001)
- The Producers (2001)
- Thoroughly Modern Millie (2002)
- Avenue Q (2003)
- Doubt (2005)
- Shrek the Musical (musical) (2008)
- In the Heights (2008)
- The Addams Family (2009)
- Elf (2010)
- Love Never Dies (2010)
- Ordinary Days (2010)
- Newsies (2012)
- If/Then (2014)
- The Lightning Thief (2014)
- Hamilton (2015)
- A Bronx Tale (2016)
- Tick, Tick... Boom! (2021)
- Paradise Square (2022)
- New York, New York (2023)
- Two Strangers (Carry a Cake Across New York) (2025)
- The Greatest Showman (2026)
