= Milton H. Greene =

American photographer and film producer (1922–1985)

- Born: Milton H. Greengold; March 14, 1922; New York City, U.S.
- Died: August 8, 1985 (aged 63); Los Angeles, California, U.S.
- Known for: Fashion, Marilyn Monroe, commercial, portraits
- Spouses: Evelyn Franklin (m. 1942; div. 1949) Amy Franco (m. 1953)
- Children: 2
- Website: www.miltonhgreene.com

Milton H. Greene (March 14, 1922 – August 8, 1985) was an American fashion and celebrity photographer and film and television producer, best known for his photo shoots with Marilyn Monroe.

== Early life ==
Greene was born Milton H. Greengold into a Jewish family in New York City on March 14, 1922. He became interested in photography as a teenager and began taking photos at the age of 14. Greene was awarded a scholarship to Pratt Institute, but decided to pursue a career in photography instead. He apprenticed with photojournalist Eliot Elisofon and later worked as an assistant to Louise Dahl-Wolfe. Greene eventually began his own career and, at the age of twenty-three, became known as "Color Photography's Wonder Boy".

== Career ==
Greene initially established himself in high fashion photography in the 1940s and 1950s. His fashion shots appeared in Harper's Bazaar and Vogue. Greene then turned to portraits of celebrities. He photographed many high-profile personalities in the 1950s and 1960s, including Elizabeth Taylor, Frank Sinatra, Audrey Hepburn, Grace Kelly, Ava Gardner, Sammy Davis Jr., Catherine Deneuve, Marlene Dietrich, and Judy Garland.

Greene's work with Marilyn Monroe (whom he first shot for a layout for Look in 1953) changed the course of his career. The two struck up a friendship and, when Monroe left Los Angeles to study acting with Lee Strasberg in New York City, she stayed with Greene, his wife Amy and young son Joshua in Connecticut. Together with Greene, Monroe formed Marilyn Monroe Productions, a production company in an effort to gain control of her career (from Hollywood powerhouses). Greene would go on to produce Bus Stop (1956) and The Prince and the Showgirl (1957). The two also collaborated on some 53 photo sessions, some of which became well known, including "The Black Sitting". Greene's photograph for one such sitting in 1954 featuring Monroe in a ballet tutu, borrowed from the showroom at Junior Sophisticates, was chosen by Time Life as one of the three most popular images of the 20th century. Monroe and Greene's friendship ended after the production of The Prince and the Showgirl in 1957, and they decided to separate.

== Personal life ==
Greene's first marriage was to his childhood sweetheart Evelyn Franklin in 1942. They divorced in 1949. His second marriage was to model Amy Franco (born 1929 in Cuba), whom he married in 1953. They had two sons, Joshua and Anthony. They remained married until Greene's death in 1985.

== Death ==
On August 8, 1985, Greene died of lymphoma at a Los Angeles hospital at the age of 63. His ashes were scattered in the Pacific Ocean by his family.

== Publications ==
- But That's Another Story – A Photographic Retrospective of His Life's Work by Amy & Joshua Greene
- Of Women and Their Elegance – A Collaboration: Norman Mailer, Simon & Schuster
- Marilyn Monroe – A Biography by Norman Mailer, Grosset & Dunlop, Inc.
- The Nude in Photography – Arthur Goldsmith; Ridge Press
- The Look Book – Leo Rosten and Harry N. Abrams
- The Image Makers – Sixty Years of Hollywood Glamour; McGraw Hill
- U.S. Camera – U.S. Camera Publishing
- 20,000 Years of Fashion – Harry Abrams
- My Story – Marilyn Monroe; Stein & Day
- The Marcel Marceau Counting Book – Doubleday (publisher)
- Life Goes to the Movies – Time-Life Books
- The Best of Life – Time-Life Books
- Life in Camelot; The Kennedy Years – Time-Life Books
- The First Fifty Years of Life – Time-Life Books
- Milton's Marilyn by James Kotsilibas-Davis and Joshua Greene
- My Story: The Autobiography of Marilyn Monroe

== In popular culture ==
English actor Dominic Cooper portrayed Greene in the 2011 film My Week with Marilyn.
