= Superman Comes to the Supermarket =

Essay by Norman Mailer

- Cover of 2019 edition by Taschen
- Author: Norman Mailer
- Original title: Superman Comes to the Supermart
- Genre: Politics
- Published in: Esquire
- Publication date: November 1960
- Publication place: United States
- Media type: Print (periodical magazine)
- Pages: 9

"Superman Comes to the Supermarket" is an essay by the American novelist and journalist Norman Mailer about the 1960 Democratic convention. Originally published in Esquire as "Superman Comes to the Supermart," this essay was Mailer's initial foray into political journalism. It characterizes John F. Kennedy as a potential "existential hero" who could revitalize the US after eight years under Dwight D. Eisenhower to rediscover its lost imagination. "Superman" further develops and emphasizes Mailer's concern with the importance of the individual's will and creativity that must challenge conformity and obedience in American life to fully realize a genuine life. With "Superman", Mailer extends New Journalism by taking an active role in the narrative, which would characterize much of his subsequent journalistic style and lead to his Pulitzer Prize for The Armies of the Night in 1968.

== Background ==
Norman Mailer became associated with New Journalism, a term applied to the work of writers as diverse as George Plimpton, Gay Talese, Tom Wolfe, Truman Capote, Joan Didion, and Hunter S. Thompson, who were re-energizing literary journalism in the 1960s-1970s. New Journalists wrote subjective, long-form journalism by employing dialogue, characterization, figurative language, and stylistic and formal experimentation traditionally associated with novels and short stories. "Superman" marks the beginning of Mailer's foray into New Journalism and of a series of works by Mailer dealing with political campaigns, including "In the Red Light: A History of the Republican Convention in 1964" (1964); Miami and the Siege of Chicago (1968); St. George and the Godfather (1972); "By Heaven Inspired: Republican Convention Revisited" (1992); and "War of the Oxymorons" (1996).

== Synopsis ==
"Superman Comes to the Supermarket" is divided into six sections, each with its own subject headings.

Mailer arrives in Los Angeles in 1960 to report on the Democratic convention which would nominate John F. Kennedy who would go on to defeat Republican Richard M. Nixon. Mailer proposes to unravel the mystery of the convention which "began as one mystery and ended as another." The first mystery was Kennedy himself: young, Catholic, and physically attractive, in all those ways unlike any who had ever become the nominee of a major political party. The convention, he recalls, was largely devoid of drama owing to his domination of the primary elections, and yet its importance could not be overstated because "America was in danger of drifting into a profound decline," the result of Cold War paranoia, conformity, and encroaching totalitarianism.

In Section 1, Mailer begins with his sense that the Democratic delegates and party bosses who had come to Los Angeles were in a state of panic because they were about to nominate a man they did not altogether understand. They understand that Kennedy's money and organization have enabled him to win the primaries and that his politics are conventionally liberal, and yet, Mailer writes, "the candidate for all his record, his good, sound, conventional liberal record has a patina of that other life, the second American life, the long electric night with the fires of neon leading down the highway to the murmur of jazz". Mailer this introduces a theme, "the second American life", which he will develop throughout the essay.

Since the First World War Americans have been leading a double life, and our history has moved on two rivers, one visible, the other underground; there has been the history of politics which is concrete, factual, practical and unbelievably dull if not for the consequences of the actions of some of these men; and there is a subterranean river of untapped, ferocious, lonely and romantic desires, that concentration of ecstasy and violence which is the dream life of the nation.

Section 2 begins with "the pastel monotonies of Los Angeles architecture". Mailer develops one of the two metaphors in his title: "the spirit of the supermarket, that homogeneous extension of stainless surfaces and psychoanalyzed people, packaged commodities and ranch homes, interchangeable, geographically unrecognizable, that essence of a new postwar SuperAmerica is found nowhere so perfectly as in Los Angeles' ubiquitous acres". He then offers a series of brief character sketches of some of the key players at the convention such as Lyndon Johnson, Adlai Stevenson, and Eleanor Roosevelt.

Mailer begins Section 3 with the crucial insight: "the Democrats were going to nominate a man who [was] going to be seen as a great box-office actor, and the consequences of that were staggering and not at all easy to calculate. He identifies the greatest threat facing the nation as Cold War conformity and totalitarianism, but the saving grace for American society might be its ability to resist social and cultural homogenization because "America was the land where people still believed in heroes" like John F. Kennedy. Hollywood created a breed of heroes who lived in this American myth, or what Mailer refers to as a river of heroic possibilities. However, the conformity of the Cold War years had forced that river back underground while "the myth continued to flow, fed by television and the film". To realize this hidden potential once again, America needed a hero like Kennedy who could "capture the secret imagination of a people" and embody a heroic fantasy all Americans could imagine as their own.

Although they were not at all similar as people, the quality was reminiscent of someone like Brando whose expression rarely changes, but whose appearances seems to shift from one person into another as the minutes go by … like Brando, Kennedy's most characteristic quality is the remote and private air of a man who has traversed some lonely terrain of experience, of loss and gain, of nearness to death, which leaves him isolated from the mass of others.

In Section 4 Mailer offers a portrait of Kennedy based on a couple of face to face encounters with the candidate and his wife Jacqueline, during one of which Kennedy flatters Mailer's vanity by telling him that he had read his novels, mentioning specifically not the one for which Mailer was most famous, The Naked and the Dead (1948), but the lesser-known The Deer Park (1955). He recounts some of Kennedy's biography, including his legendary heroism during WWII. He extends his metaphor of Kennedy-as-actor, comparing him to Marlon Brando. Mailer concludes this section optimistically, feeling that "With such a man in office the myth of the nation would again be engaged".

In Section 5 Mailer speculates on what might have happened at the convention had Adlai Stevenson, a popular favorite among Democrats, more proactively pursued the nomination, and he praises Eugene McCarthy's speech introducing Stevenson to the convention crowd. He shifts into narrative mode as he details events on nominating day, and he comments on the coincidence that Kennedy shared not only the name Fitzgerald with the great American writer F. Scott Fitzgerald but something of the iconic Jazz Age style.

Mailer begins Section 6 by stating that he did not attend the subsequent Republican convention; rather, he watched it on television. The televised event reinforced his understanding of the kind of people who typically associated with the Republican Party, and he lists a wide variety of types. He also offers this assessment of their candidate, Richard Nixon, who "would be given the manufactured image of an ordinary man . . . whose greatest qualification for President was his profound abasement before the glories of the Republic, the stability of the mediocre, and his own unworthiness."

Extending his analysis of the collective American psyche, Mailer ruminates on "the power of each man to radiate his appeal into some fundamental depths of the American character". Mailer constructs Kennedy and Nixon as polar opposites and anticipates that: "One would have an inkling at last if the desire of America was for drama or stability, for adventure or monotony". He concludes the essay on a note of ominous uncertainty: that if Nixon were to succeed, Americans in the eastern half of the country might go to bed on election night unaware of what would happen out west, "at three o'clock in the morning on that long dark night of America's search for a security cheaper than her soul". His reference to a "long dark night" echoes a quote by F. Scott Fitzgerald from The Crack-Up: "In a real dark night of the soul it is always three o'clock in the morning".

== Analysis ==
Mailer's journalistic account records campaign events roughly as they occurred chronologically, but as a literary journalist recounting historically-known facts, he focuses as much on his subjective reactions to events as on the events themselves. As a novelist, Mailer was attuned to the potential drama of a political convention, particularly if the outcome was in doubt. In his introduction to the essay's 2019 reprint titled "Triumph at the Biltmore", Mailer's biographer J. Michael Lennon writes that in this essay "Mailer had depicted the campaign as the outcome of a dramatic morality play rather than as a realignment of voter preferences based on demographic and party promises". Initially, he intuited that this convention, with Kennedy's nomination all but certain, was going to lack drama, but true to the contingent nature of current events, uncertainty prevailed, and the convention provided some short-lived drama during the nomination process and its aftermath.

Mailer's reporting was highly intuitive and imaginative, and he recreates his subjective reactions to events, which have their own phenomenal reality, making those the major focus of his account. He would, in Robert Merrill's view, look at the subjective account to consider the truth of historical events, rather than their statistical accounts. Mailer was sensitive to nuances of human behavior and attuned to motives, both conscious and unconscious: "We engage in politics", he observes, "to hide from ourselves", as the nicotine addict hides behind the cigarette. Mailer both figuratively re-imagines and psychologizes history. "Civilized man and underprivileged man", he says, "had melted into mass man . . . men as interchangeable commodities". Mailer the novelist tended to see life in terms of art. He imagined future president John F. Kennedy as a movie star, a hero. The hero both embodies and gives direction to his time; he reflects the character of the country to itself: the importance of individual self-reliance against the oppressive tendency to conform. Mailer tended to frame his arguments in terms of dichotomies, and in this essay he associates Kennedy with drama and adventure, Richard Nixon with monotony and stability, yet he senses the "power of each man to radiate his appeal into some fundamental depths of the American character".

Mailer's reporting is scrupulous in regard to facts, but his style is heavily figurative and allusive. He imagines the Democratic Party as a "crazy, half-rich family . . . the Snopes family married to Henry James". His sentences are loose, expansive, and improvisational. He includes voluminous lists of people and places, recalling Walt Whitman's poetic catalogues. Like another American Romantic, Ralph Waldo Emerson, Mailer's essayistic arrangement frequently digresses as he muses on the symbolic meanings of events. To populate his narrative, Mailer sketches a series of revealing personality profiles of well-known public figures such as Lyndon Johnson, Adlai Stevenson, and Eleanor Roosevelt, focusing on their voices, movements, and facial expressions.

Like all of Mailer's journalism, his narrative about the '60 convention is open-ended, acknowledging the unknown outcome of current events. He concludes with a question about the fate of America and the American myth. Americans faced two choices: one, Kennedy, who would resurrect the myth, and another, Nixon, who would leave it buried. Mailer broods over which "psychic direction America would now choose for itself".

== Publication ==
Clay Felker, an editor at Esquire, first proposed to Mailer that he cover the 1960 convention. Mailer had not voted for a presidential candidate since 1948 when he voted for third-party candidate Henry A. Wallace. Lennon recounts that Mailer felt "Bored and depressed by the knee-jerk patriotism and family pieties of the tranquilized Eisenhower era". However, as Mailer writes in the essay, he had met the Kennedys at their family's compound in Hyannis and was impressed by them both. He had interviewed Jacqueline Kennedy and turned that interview into a piece called "An Evening with Jackie Kennedy". Following the 1957 publication of his essay "The White Negro: Superficial Reflections on the Hipster", Mailer saw Kennedy as potentially the first "hipster president". When the essay was published, Esquire co-founder and publisher Arnold Gingrich, antagonistic to Mailer, changed the title to "Superman Comes to the Supermart". Furious about the change, Mailer protested, and Felker promised to restore the original title, but he never did. Mailer then resigned from the magazine, and whenever he was asked to autograph copies in the future he always crossed out "Supermart" and wrote "Supermarket".

The essay hit the newsstands on October 18, 1960, in the November 1960 edition of Esquire just three weeks before the election. It has been reprinted in Smiling Through the Apocalypse (1970), a collection of Esquire essays, and in Mailer's collections The Presidential Papers (1963), The Idol and the Octopus (1968), Some Honorable Men (1976), The Time of Our Time (1998) (partial), Mind of an Outlaw (2013), and most recently in the Library of America's Norman Mailer: Collected Essays of the 1960s (2018).

== Reception ==
Mailer's essay caused a sensation. Felker said that it had "an enormous impact" on journalism at the time, specifically its literary treatment of a conventionally prosaic journalistic subject. In retrospect, the essay was one of the earliest examples of what Tom Wolfe would later call The New Journalism. Journalist Pete Hamill claimed that the essay "went through journalism like a wave". He later stated he believed that his essay in some small way helped Kennedy get elected.
