= Norman Mailer =

American writer (1923–2007)

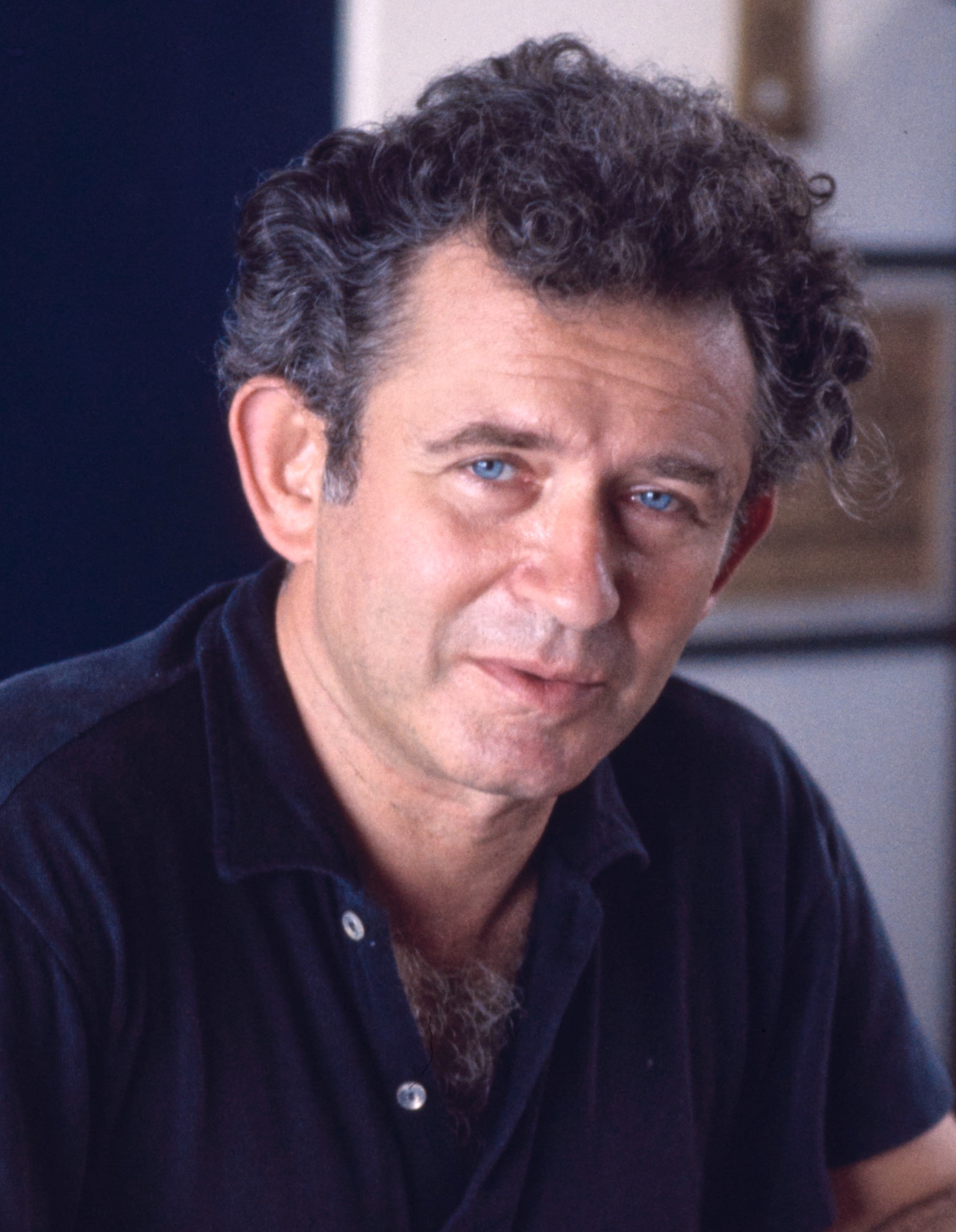
- Mailer in 1967
- Born: Nachem Malech Mailer; January 31, 1923; Long Branch, New Jersey, U.S.
- Died: November 10, 2007 (aged 84); New York City, U.S.
- Education: Harvard University (BS)
- Occupations: Novelist; essayist; journalist; columnist; poet; playwright
- Spouses: Beatrice Silverman (m. 1944; div. 1952) Adele Morales (m. 1954; div. 1962) Lady Jeanne Campbell (m. 1962; div. 1963) Beverly Bentley (m. 1963; div. 1980) Carol Stevens (m. 1980; div. 1980) (Note: This marriage lasted one day, and occurred to legitimize Mailer and Stevens' daughter, Maggie, who was born in 1971.) Barbara Davis (m. 1980)
- Children: 9, including Susan, Kate, Michael, Stephen, and John
- Writing career
- Period: 1941–2007
- Notable works: The Naked and the Dead (1948); The Armies of the Night (1968); The Executioner's Song (1979)

Signature
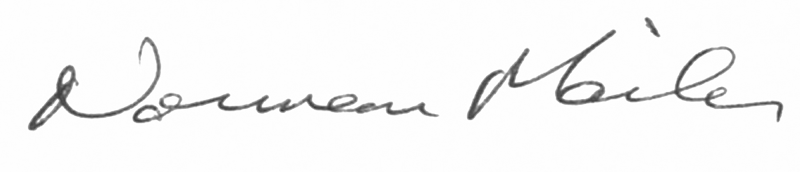

Nachem Malech Mailer (January 31, 1923 – November 10, 2007), known by his pen name Norman Kingsley Mailer, was an American writer, journalist, and filmmaker. In a career spanning more than six decades, Mailer had 11 best-selling books, at least one in each of the seven decades after World War II.

His novel The Naked and the Dead was published in 1948 and brought him early renown. His 1968 nonfiction novel The Armies of the Night won the Pulitzer Prize for nonfiction as well as the National Book Award. Among his other well-known works are An American Dream (1965), The Fight (1975) and The Executioner's Song (1979), which won the Pulitzer Prize for fiction.

Mailer is considered an innovator of "creative nonfiction" or "New Journalism", along with Gay Talese, Truman Capote, Hunter S. Thompson, Joan Didion and Tom Wolfe, a genre that uses the style and devices of literary fiction in factual journalism. He was a prominent cultural commentator and critic, expressing his often controversial views through his novels, journalism, frequent press appearances, and essays, the most famous and reprinted of which is "The White Negro". In 1955, he and three others founded The Village Voice, an arts and politics-oriented weekly newspaper distributed in Greenwich Village.

In 1960, Mailer was convicted of assault and served a three-year probation after he stabbed his wife Adele Morales with a penknife, nearly killing her. In 1969, he ran an unsuccessful campaign to become the mayor of New York, finishing fourth in the Democratic primaries. Mailer was married six times and had nine children.

== Early life ==
Nachem "Norman" Malech ("King") (Note: Though Kingsley was used on the birth certificate.) Mailer was born to a Jewish family in Long Branch, New Jersey, on January 31, 1923. His father, Isaac Barnett Mailer, popularly known as "Barney", was an accountant born in South Africa. His mother, Fanny (née Schneider), ran a housekeeping and nursing agency. Both of his parents were of Lithuanian Jewish descent. Mailer's sister, Barbara, was born in 1927.

Mailer was raised in Brooklyn, first in Flatbush on Cortelyou Road and later in Crown Heights at the corner of Albany and Crown Streets. He graduated from Boys High School and entered Harvard College in 1939, when he was 16 years old. As an undergraduate, he was a member of the Signet Society. At Harvard, he majored in engineering but took writing courses as electives. He published his first story, "The Greatest Thing in the World", at age 18, winning Story magazine's college contest in 1941.

Mailer graduated from Harvard in 1943 with a Bachelor of Science with honors. He married his first wife Beatrice "Bea" Silverman in January 1944, just before he was drafted into the U.S. Army. Hoping to gain a deferment from service, Mailer argued that he was writing an "important literary work" that pertained to the war. The deferral was denied, and Mailer was forced to enter the Army. After training at Fort Bragg, he was stationed in the Philippines with the 112th Cavalry.

During his time in the Philippines, Mailer was first assigned to regimental headquarters as a typist, then assigned as a wire lineman. In early 1945, after volunteering for a reconnaissance platoon, he completed more than two dozen patrols in contested territory and engaged in several firefights and skirmishes. After the Japanese surrender, he was sent to Japan as part of the army of occupation, was promoted to sergeant, and became a first cook.

When asked about his war experiences, he said that the army was "the worst experience of my life, and also the most important". While in Japan and the Philippines, Mailer wrote to his wife Bea almost daily, and these approximately 400 letters became the foundation of The Naked and the Dead. He drew on his experience as a reconnaissance rifleman for the central action of the novel: a long patrol behind enemy lines.

== Novelist ==
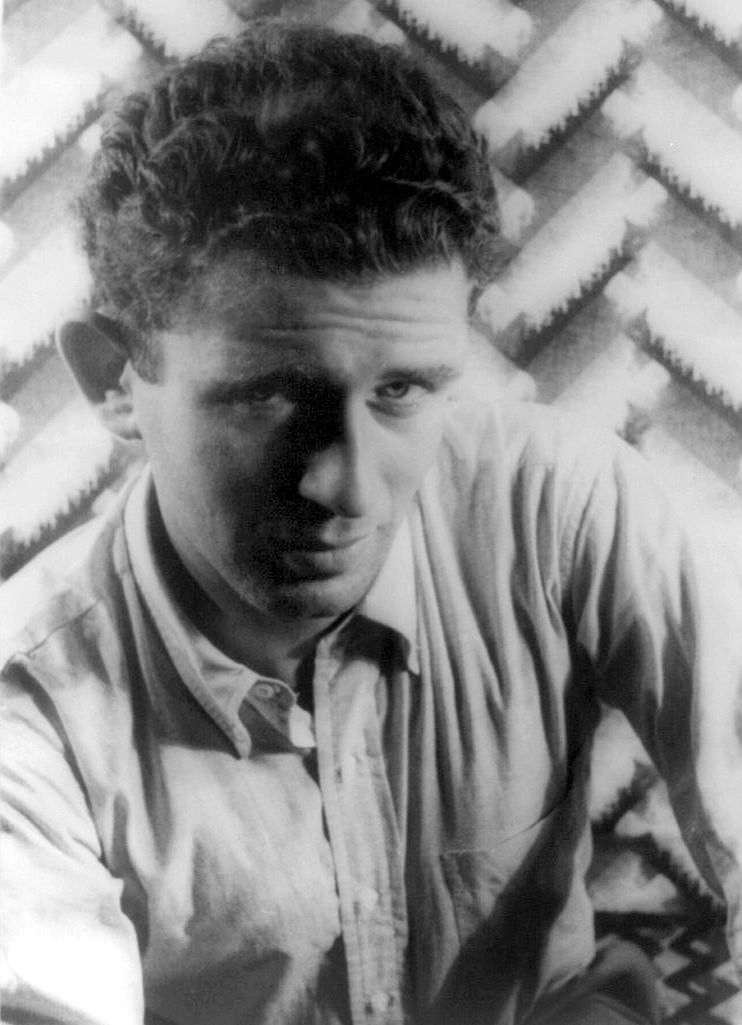
Mailer photographed by Carl Van Vechten in 1948

Mailer wrote 12 novels in 59 years. After completing courses in French language and culture at the University of Paris in 1947–48, he returned to the U.S. shortly after The Naked and the Dead was published in May 1948. A New York Times best seller for 62 weeks, it was the only one of Mailer's novels to reach the number one position. It was hailed by many as one of the best American wartime novels and included in a list of the hundred best English-language novels of the twentieth century by the Modern Library. The book that made his reputation sold more than a million copies in its first year, (three million by 1981) and has never gone out of print. It is still considered to be one of the finest depictions of Americans in combat during World War II.

Barbary Shore (1951) was not well received by the critics. It was a surreal parable of Cold War leftist politics set in a Brooklyn rooming-house, and Mailer's most autobiographical novel. His 1955 novel, The Deer Park drew on his experiences working as a screenwriter in Hollywood from 1949 to 1950. It was initially rejected by seven publishers due to its purportedly sexual content before being published by Putnam's. It was not a critical success, but it made the best-seller list, sold more than 50,000 copies its first year, and is considered by some critics to be the best Hollywood novel since Nathanael West's The Day of the Locust.

Mailer wrote his fourth novel, An American Dream, as a serial in Esquire magazine over eight months (January to August 1964), publishing the first chapter two months after he wrote it. In March 1965, Dial Press published a revised version. The novel generally received mixed reviews, but was a best seller. Joan Didion praised it in a review in National Review (April 20, 1965) and John W. Aldridge did the same in Life (March 19, 1965), while Elizabeth Hardwick panned it in Partisan Review (spring 1965). Mailer's fifth novel, Why Are We in Vietnam? was even more experimental in its prose than An American Dream. Published in 1967, its critical reception was mostly positive, with many critics, like John Aldridge in Harper's Magazine, calling the novel a masterpiece and comparing it to Joyce. Mailer's obscene language was criticized by Granville Hicks writing in the Saturday Review and the anonymous reviewer in Time. Eliot Fremont-Smith called the novel "the most original, courageous and provocative novel so far this year" that's likely to be "mistakenly reviled". Other critics, such as Denis Donoghue from the New York Review of Books praised Mailer for his verisimilitude "for the sensory event". Donoghue recalls Josephine Miles' study of the American Sublime, suggesting that the impact of Why Are We in Vietnam? was in its voice and style.

In 1972, Joyce Carol Oates called Vietnam "Mailer's most important work"; it is "an outrageous little masterpiece" that "contains some of Mailer's finest writing" and thematically echoes John Milton's Paradise Lost.

In 1980, The Executioner's Song, Mailer's "real-life novel" of the life and death of murderer Gary Gilmore, won the Pulitzer Prize for fiction. Joan Didion reflected the views of many readers when she called the novel "an absolutely astonishing book" at the end of her front-page review in the New York Times Book Review.

Mailer spent a longer time writing Ancient Evenings, his novel of Egypt in the Twentieth Dynasty (about 1100 BC), than any of his other books. He worked on it for periods from 1972 until 1983. It was also a bestseller, although reviews were generally negative. Harold Bloom, in his review said the book "gives every sign of truncation", and "could be half again as long, but no reader will wish so", while Richard Poirier called it Mailer's "most audacious book".

Harlot's Ghost, Mailer's longest novel (1310 pages), appeared in 1991 and received his best reviews since The Executioner's Song. It is an exploration of the untold dramas of the CIA from the end of World War II to 1965. He undertook a huge amount of research for the novel, which is still on CIA reading lists. He ended the novel with the words "To be continued" and planned to write a sequel, titled Harlot's Grave, but other projects intervened and he never wrote it. Harlot's Ghost sold well.

His final novel, The Castle in the Forest, which focused on Hitler's childhood, reached number five on the Times best-seller list after publication in January 2007. It received reviews that were more positive than any of his books since The Executioner's Song. Castle was intended to be the first volume of a trilogy, but Mailer died several months after it was completed. The Castle in the Forest received a laudatory 6,200-word front-page review by Lee Siegel in the New York Times Book Review, as well as a Bad Sex in Fiction Award by the Literary Review magazine.

== Journalist ==
From the mid-1950s, Mailer became known for his countercultural essays. In 1955, he co-founded The Village Voice and was initially an investor and silent partner, but later he wrote a column called "Quickly: A Column for Slow Readers" from January to April 1956. (Note: Quickly: A Column for Slow Readers (originally 'Thinkers'). Village Voice (January 11 – May 2)) His articles published in this column, 17 in total, were important in his development of a philosophy of hip, or "American existentialism", and allowed him to discover his penchant for journalism. Mailer's famous essay "The White Negro" (1957) fleshes out the hipster figure who stands in opposition to forces that seek debilitating conformity in American society. It is believed to be among the most anthologized, and controversial, essays of the postwar period. Mailer republished it in 1959 in his miscellany Advertisements for Myself, which he described as "The first work I wrote with a style I could call my own." The reviews were positive, and most commentators referred to it as his breakthrough work.

In 1960, Mailer wrote "Superman Comes to the Supermarket" for Esquire magazine, an account of the emergence of John F. Kennedy during the Democratic Party convention. The essay was an important breakthrough for the New Journalism of the 1960s, but when the magazine's editors changed the title to "Superman Comes to the Supermart", Mailer was enraged, and would not write for Esquire for years. (The magazine later apologized. Subsequent references are to the original title.)

Mailer took part in the October 1967 march on the Pentagon, but initially had no intention of writing a book about it. After conversations with his friend, Willie Morris, editor of Harper's magazine, he agreed to produce a long essay describing the march. In a concentrated effort, he produced a 90,000-word piece in two months, and it appeared in Harper's March issue. It was the longest nonfiction piece to be published by an American magazine. As one commentator states, "Mailer disarmed the literary world with Armies. The combination of detached, ironic self-presentation [he described himself in the third person], deft portraiture of literary figures (especially Robert Lowell, Dwight Macdonald, and Paul Goodman), a reported flawless account of the March itself, and a passionate argument addressed to a divided nation, resulted in a sui generis narrative praised by even some of his most inveterate revilers." Alfred Kazin, writing in the New York Times Book Review, said, "Mailer's intuition is that the times demand a new form. He has found it." He later expanded the article to a book, The Armies of the Night (1968), awarded a National Book Award and a Pulitzer Prize.

Mailer's major new journalism, or creative nonfiction, books also include Miami and the Siege of Chicago (1968), an account of the 1968 political conventions; Of a Fire on the Moon (1971), a long report on the Apollo 11 mission to the moon; The Prisoner of Sex (1971), his response to Kate Millett's critique of the patriarchal myths in the works of Mailer, Jean Genet, Henry Miller and D.H. Lawrence; and The Fight (1975), an account of Muhammad Ali's 1974 defeat in Zaire of George Foreman for the heavyweight boxing championship. Miami, Fire and Prisoner were all finalists for the National Book Award. The hallmark of his five New Journalism works is his use of illeism, or referring to oneself in the third person, rather than the first. Mailer said he got the idea from reading The Education of Henry Adams (1918) when he was a Harvard freshman. Mailer also employs many of the most common techniques of fiction in his creative nonfiction.

== Filmmaker ==
In addition to his experimental fiction and nonfiction novels, Mailer produced a play version of The Deer Park (staged at the Theatre De Lys in Greenwich Village in 1967), which had a four-month run and generally good reviews. In 2007, months before he died, he re-wrote the script, and asked his son Michael, a film producer, to film a staged production in Provincetown, but had to cancel because of his declining health. Mailer obsessed over The Deer Park more than he did over any other work. (Note: According to Lennon (2013, pp. 755, 757), Mailer was trying to rewrite the play (already revised several times) in the last months of his life, suggests this obsession. He spent tens of thousands of dollars in 1967 keeping the play running in NYC even when people stopped coming to see it. Lennon & Lennon (2018, 57.20) note that he began adapting it in 1956, but did not complete it for over a decade. In the eighties, he also had Joan Didion and her husband John Gregory Dunne write a screenplay of it, but didn't like it. Stephan Morrow (2008, pp. 149–52) put on a revised version of it in the early 2000s, and recounts that Mailer wanted to collaborate on another version with Morrow when the former passed in 2007.)

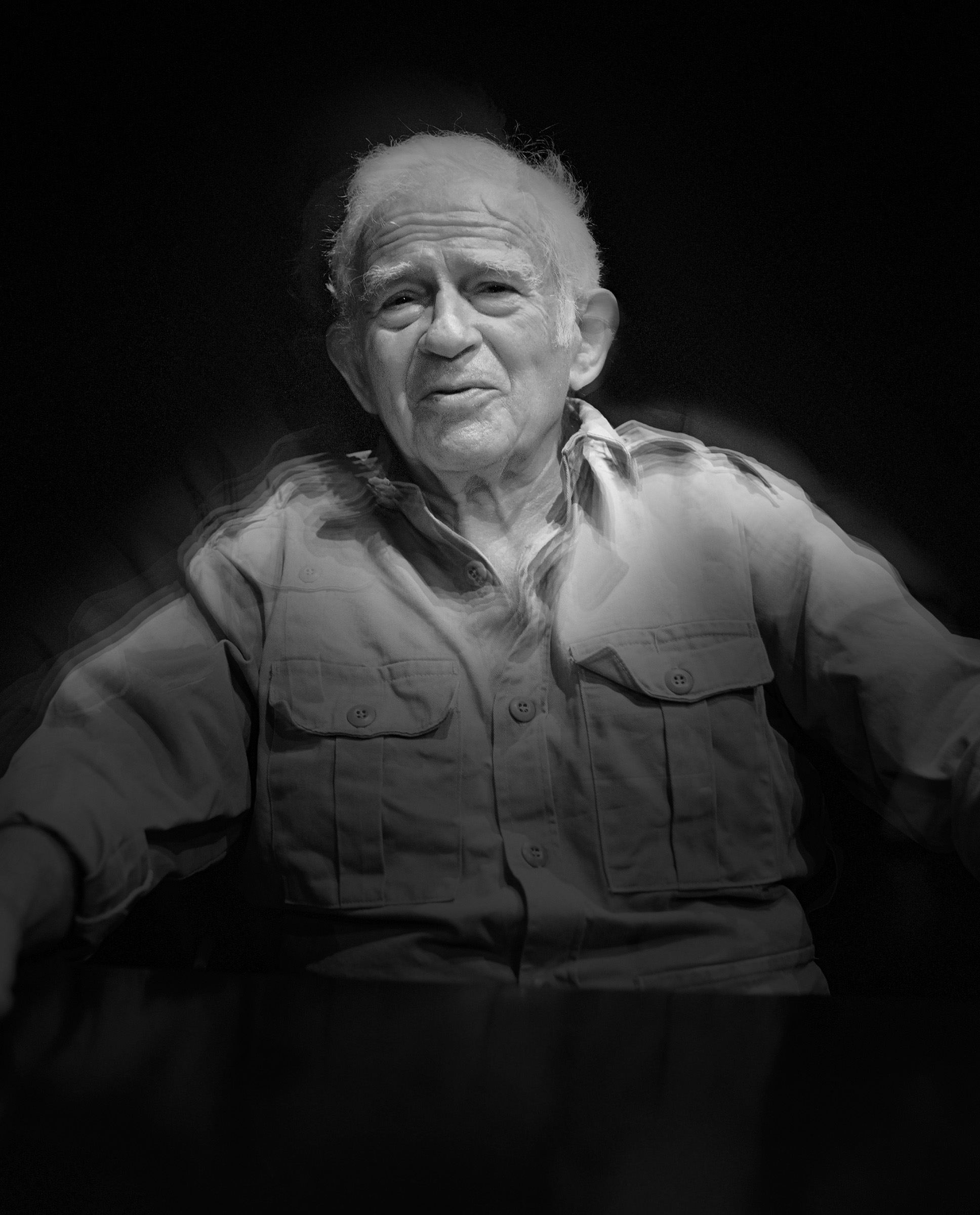
Mailer in Berlin in 2002

In the late 1960s, Mailer directed three improvisational avant-garde films: Wild 90 (1968), Beyond the Law (1968), and Maidstone (1970). The latter includes a spontaneous and brutal brawl between Norman T. Kingsley, played by Mailer, and Kingsley's half-brother Raoul, played by Rip Torn. Mailer received a head injury when Torn struck him with a hammer, and Torn's ear became infected when Mailer bit it. In 2012, the Criterion Collection released Mailer's experimental films in a box set, "Maidstone and Other Films by Norman Mailer". In 1987, he adapted and directed a film version of his novel Tough Guys Don't Dance starring Ryan O'Neal and Isabella Rossellini, which has become a minor camp classic.

Mailer took on an acting role in the 1981 Miloš Forman film version of E.L. Doctorow's novel Ragtime, playing Stanford White. In 1999, he played Harry Houdini in Matthew Barney's Cremaster 2, which was inspired by the events surrounding the life of Gary Gilmore.

In 1976, Mailer went to Italy for several weeks to collaborate with Italian Spaghetti Western filmmaker Sergio Leone on an adaptation of the Harry Grey novel The Hoods. Although Leone would pursue other writers shortly thereafter, elements of Mailer's first two drafts of the commissioned screenplay would appear in the Italian filmmaker's final film, Once Upon a Time in America (1984), starring Robert De Niro.

Mailer starred alongside writer/feminist Germaine Greer in D.A. Pennebaker's Town Bloody Hall, which was shot in 1971 but not released until 1979.

In 1982, Mailer and Lawrence Schiller would collaborate on a television adaptation of The Executioner's Song, starring Tommy Lee Jones, Rosanna Arquette, and Eli Wallach. Airing on November 28 and 29, The Executioner's Song received strong critical reviews and four Emmy nominations, including one for Mailer's screenplay. It won two: for sound production and for Jones as best actor.

In 1987, Mailer was to appear in Jean-Luc Godard's experimental film version of Shakespeare's King Lear, to be shot in Switzerland. Originally, Mailer was to play the lead character, Don Learo, in Godard's unscripted film alongside his daughter, Kate Mailer. The film also featured Woody Allen and Peter Sellars. However, tensions surfaced between Mailer and Godard early in the production when Godard insisted that Mailer play a character who had a carnal relationship with his own daughter. Mailer left Switzerland after just one day of shooting.

In 1997, Mailer was set to direct the boxing drama "Ringside", based on an original script by his son Michael and two others. The male lead role, an Irish-American streetfighter who finds redemption in the ring, was to be Brendan Fraser, and it was also to star Halle Berry, Anthony Quinn, and Paul Sorvino.

In 2001, he adapted the screenplay for the movie: Master Spy: The Robert Hanssen Story. Mailer a year prior also wrote the screenplay for the OJ Simpson Trial TV biopic American Tragedy.

In 2005, Mailer served as a technical consultant on the Ron Howard boxing movie Cinderella Man, about legendary boxer Jim Braddock.

== Biographer ==
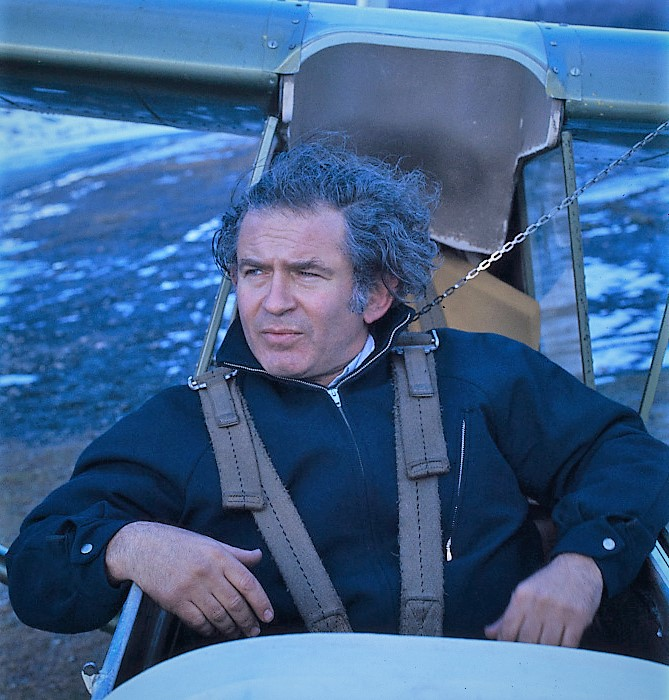
Mailer in glider, 1970s

Mailer's approach to biography came from his interest in the ego of the artist as an "exemplary type". His own biographer, J. Michael Lennon, explains that Mailer would use "himself as a species of divining rod to explore the psychic depths" of disparate personalities, like Pablo Picasso, Muhammad Ali, Gary Gilmore, Lee Harvey Oswald, and Marilyn Monroe. "Ego," states Lennon, "can be seen as the beginning of a major phase in his writing career: Mailer as biographer."

Beginning as an assignment from Lawrence Schiller to write a short preface to a collection of photographs, Mailer's 1973 biography of Monroe (usually designated Marilyn: A Biography) (Note: The book is commonly referenced as Marilyn: A Biography, e.g. in Michael Lennon's Critical Essays. But that is a dubitable title. The display type on the title page begins with "Marilyn" on the top line, "a biography by" on another, followed by "Norman" and "Mailer" on two more.) was not approached as a traditional biography. Mailer read the available biographies, watched Monroe's films, and looked at photographs of Monroe; for the rest of it, Mailer stated, "I speculated." Since Mailer did not have the time to thoroughly research the facts surrounding her death, his speculation led to the biography's controversy. The book's final chapter theorizes that Monroe was murdered by rogue agents of the FBI and CIA who resented her supposed affair with Robert F. Kennedy. Mailer later admitted that he embellished the book with speculations about Monroe's sex life and death that he did not himself believe to ensure its commercial success. In his own autobiography, Monroe's former husband Arthur Miller wrote that Mailer saw himself as Monroe "in drag, acting out his own Hollywood fantasies of fame and sex unlimited and power."

The book was enormously successful; it sold more copies than did any of Mailer's works except The Naked and the Dead, and it is Mailer's most widely reviewed book. It was the inspiration for the Emmy-nominated TV movie Marilyn: The Untold Story, which aired in 1980. Two later works co-written by Mailer presented imagined words and thoughts in Monroe's voice: the 1980 book Of Women and Their Elegance and the 1986 play Strawhead, which was produced off Broadway starring his daughter Kate Mailer.

In the wake of the Marilyn controversy, Mailer attempted to explain his unique approach to biography. He suggests that his biography must be seen as a "species of novel ready to play by the rules of biography." Exemplary egos, he explains, are best explained by other exemplary egos, and personalities like Monroe's are best left in the hands of a novelist.

== Activist ==
A number of Mailer's nonfiction works, such as The Armies of the Night and The Presidential Papers, are political. He covered the Republican and Democratic National Conventions in 1960, 1964, 1968, 1972, 1992, and 1996, although his account of the 1996 Democratic convention has never been published. In the early 1960s he was fixated on the figure of President John F. Kennedy, whom he regarded as an "existential hero". In the late 1950s and throughout the 1960s and 1970s, his work mingled autobiography, social commentary, history, fiction, and poetry in a formally original way that influenced the development of New Journalism.

Mailer held the position that the Cold War was not a positive ideal for America. It allowed the state to become strong and invested in the daily lives of the people. He critiqued conservative politics as they, specifically those of Barry Goldwater, supported the Cold War and an increase in government spending and oversight. This, Mailer argued, stood in opposition with conservative principles such as lower taxes and smaller government. He believed that conservatives were pro-Cold War because that was politically relevant to them and would therefore help them win.

Indeed, Mailer was outspoken about his mistrust of politics in general as a way of meaningful change in America. In Miami and the Siege of Chicago (1968), he explained his view of "politics-as-property", likening a politician to a property holder who is "never ambivalent about his land, he does not mock it or see other adjacent estates as more deserving than his own." Thus politics is just people trading their influence as capital in an attempt to serve their own interests. This cynical view of politicians serving only themselves perhaps explains his views on Watergate. Mailer saw politics as a sporting event: "If you played for a team, you did your best to play very well, but there was something obscene ... in starting to think there was more moral worth to Michigan than Ohio State." Mailer thought that Nixon lost and was demonized only because he played for the wrong team. President Johnson, Mailer thought, was just as bad as Nixon had been, but he had good charisma so all was forgiven.

In September 1961, Mailer was one of 29 original prominent American sponsors of the Fair Play for Cuba Committee organization with which John F. Kennedy assassin Lee Harvey Oswald was associated in 1963. In December 1963, Mailer and several of the other sponsors left the organization. (Note: Some of the original twenty-nine sponsors of the group included Truman Capote, Robert Taber, James Baldwin, Robert F. Williams, Waldo Frank, Carleton Beals, Simone de Beauvoir, Robert Garland Colodny, Donald Harrington, and Jean-Paul Sartre.)

In October 1967, Mailer was arrested for his involvement in an anti–Vietnam War demonstration at the Pentagon sponsored by the National Mobilization Committee to End the War in Vietnam. In 1968, he signed the Writers and Editors War Tax Protest pledge, vowing to refuse tax payments in protest against the war.

In 1980, Mailer spearheaded convicted killer Jack Abbott's successful bid for parole. In 1977, Abbott had read about Mailer's work on The Executioner's Song and wrote to Mailer, offering to enlighten the author about Abbott's time behind bars and the conditions he was experiencing. Mailer, impressed, helped to publish In the Belly of the Beast, a book on life in the prison system consisting of Abbott's letters to Mailer. Once paroled, Abbott committed a murder in New York City six weeks after his release, stabbing 22-year-old Richard Adan to death. Consequently, Mailer was subject to criticism for his role. In a 1992 interview with the Buffalo News, he conceded that his involvement was "another episode in my life in which I can find nothing to cheer about or nothing to take pride in."

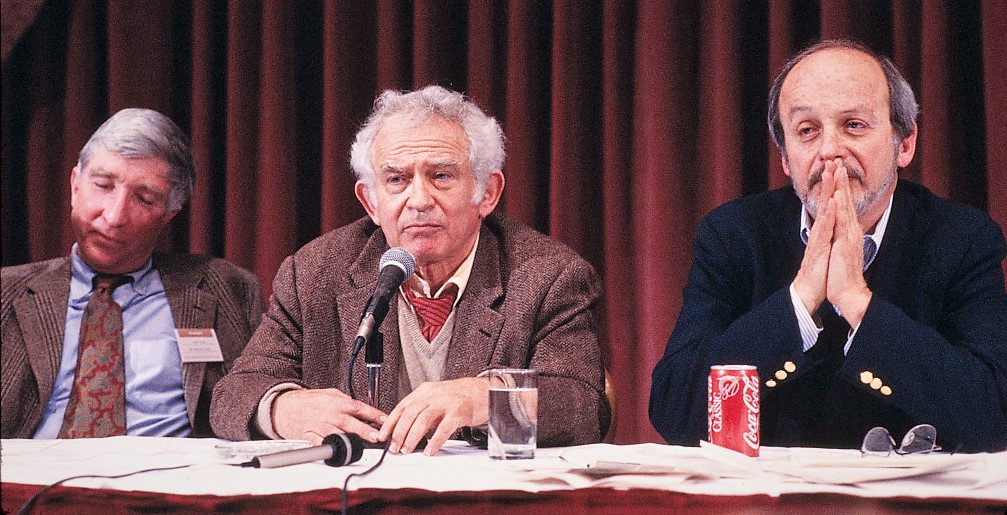
The 1986 PEN congress: (left to right) John Updike, Norman Mailer, E. L. Doctorow

The 1986 meeting of P.E.N. in New York City featured key speeches by Secretary of State George P. Shultz and Mailer. The appearance of a government official was derided by many, and as Shultz ended his speech, the crowd seethed, with some calling to "read the protest" that had been circulated to criticize Shultz's appearance. Mailer, who was next to speak, responded by shouting to the crowd: "Up yours!"

In 1989, Mailer joined with a number of other prominent authors in publicly expressing support for colleague Salman Rushdie, whose The Satanic Verses led to a fatwa issued by Iran's Islamic government calling for Rushdie's assassination.

In 2003, in a speech to the Commonwealth Club in San Francisco, just before the Iraq War, Mailer said: "Fascism is more of a natural state than democracy. To assume blithely that we can export democracy into any country we choose can serve paradoxically to encourage more fascism at home and abroad. Democracy is a state of grace that is attained only by those countries who have a host of individuals not only ready to enjoy freedom but to undergo the heavy labor of maintaining it."

From 1980 until his death in 2007, Mailer contributed to Democratic Party candidates for political office.

== Politician ==
In 1969, at the suggestion of feminist Gloria Steinem, his friend the political essayist Noel Parmentel, and others, Mailer ran unsuccessfully in the Democratic Party primary for mayor of New York City, allied with columnist Jimmy Breslin (who ran for city council president), proposing the creation of a 51st state through New York City secession. Although Mailer took stands on a wide range of issues, from opposing "compulsory fluoridation of the water supply" to advocating the release of Black Panther Party leader Huey Newton, decentralization was the overriding issue of the campaign. Mailer "foresaw the city, its independence secured, splintering into townships and neighborhoods, with their own school systems, police departments, housing programs, and governing philosophies." Their slogan was "throw the rascals in." Mailer was endorsed by libertarian economist Murray Rothbard, who "believed that 'smashing the urban government apparatus and fragmenting it into a myriad of constituent fragments' offered the only answer to the ills plaguing American cities," and called Mailer's campaign "the most refreshing libertarian political campaign in decades." Mailer finished fourth in a field of five. Looking back on the campaign, journalist and historian Theodore H. White called it "one of the most serious campaigns run in the United States in the last five years. . . . [H]is campaign was considered and thoughtful, the beginning of an attempt to apply ideas to a political situation." Characterizing his campaign, Mailer said: "The difference between me and the other candidates is that I'm no good and I can prove it."

== Artist ==
Mailer enjoyed drawing and drew prolifically, particularly toward the end of his life. While his work is not widely known, his drawings, which were inspired by Picasso's style, were exhibited at the Berta Walker Gallery in Provincetown in 2007, and are now displayed on the online arts community POBA - Where the Arts Live.

== Recurring themes ==
Norman Mailer's career is characterized by several recurring themes and concerns that illustrate his philosophical, social, and psychological preoccupations. These thematic concerns reflect a lifetime of grappling with the contradictions of modern life, the nature of freedom, and the complexities of identity. His work is a sustained inquiry into what it means to be truly alive in a world he viewed as increasingly dehumanized by conformity, power structures, and moral ambiguity.

=== Existential violence and masculinity ===
Mailer believed that violence, while brutal, was a path to existential authenticity and a rejection of societal repression. In The White Negro (1957), Mailer introduced his "Hipster" archetype as an individual who uses violence as a form of rebellion and self-discovery, confronting societal hypocrisy and embracing primal impulses. This perspective underlies much of his work, particularly An American Dream (1965), in which protagonist Stephen Rojack commits violent acts that symbolize a radical break from societal constraints, reflecting Mailer's existential philosophy.

Masculinity is depicted in Mailer's work as both a source of strength and a potential path to self-ruin. His exploration of masculine identity is especially evident in Why Are We in Vietnam? (1967), where a young man's hunting trip serves as an extended metaphor for American militarism and the nation's obsessive masculinity. As critic J. Michael Lennon points out, Mailer used this novel to critique America's association of manhood with domination and aggression. Mailer's writing frequently frames masculinity as an essential, though sometimes destructive, force in the search for self-identity.

=== The individual vs. society ===
Many of Mailer's protagonists are outsiders who seek to assert their individual wills in a conformist society, embodying his critique of modern institutions. In The Naked and the Dead (1948), Mailer contrasts the individual struggles of soldiers with the dehumanizing machinery of war, highlighting the tension between personal autonomy and authoritarian control. Mailer's existential belief that "to be alive was to stand alone" reflects his view that true identity comes through opposition to societal norms. This theme is echoed in Advertisements for Myself (1959), where Mailer asserts that genuine artists must break away from societal norms to achieve true creative expression.

Mailer was an outspoken critic of what he saw as a "cancer" of conformity in American society. In Advertisements for Myself (1959), he argues that artists must defy conventional values to achieve authenticity, a statement that underpins his own often controversial approach to literature and life. His distrust of middle-class values and suburban complacency is a recurring motif in his works, where he often depicts the "outsider" as a figure of integrity against societal pressures to conform. Mailer sees society as a force that suppresses individuality, pushing people towards mediocrity.

=== Politics and morality ===
Mailer engaged directly with the politics of his time, often depicting political events and figures in morally ambiguous terms. His book Miami and the Siege of Chicago (1968) documents the 1968 Democratic National Convention, where he critiques the establishment's moral failings and the inherent compromises of political power. Mailer's political views were complex—while he supported some radical ideas, he also expressed skepticism toward revolutionary ideologies, revealing his belief that politics is rarely morally straightforward.

Mailer explored the idea of leadership and heroism, particularly in relation to the "existential hero" who could lead America away from conformity. In "Superman Comes to the Supermarket" (1960), he critiques the rise of consumer culture and its impact on political leadership, arguing that America needs a leader with the "existential courage" to confront societal decay. Mailer admired figures like John F. Kennedy, whom he saw as embodying this existential vitality, though he was wary of the superficiality of political power.

However, Mailer was critical of Kennedy's limitations as a political leader. In The Presidential Papers (1963), he reflected on Kennedy's presidency, voicing concerns over the tendency of political power to prioritize public image over substantial existential action. Mailer noted that Kennedy's "political realities" sometimes fell short of his symbolic potential, a critique that grew stronger after Kennedy's assassination, when Mailer revisited his initial idealization with a degree of skepticism.

Mailer was a Zionist who strongly supported Israel and was a member of the pro-Israel Writers and Artists for Peace in the Middle East. However, in 2002, he expressed concern over Israel's treatment of Palestinians, comparing the situation of Palestinians to those in Jewish ghettos during the Holocaust.

"I start with a set of simple, unsophisticated notions about Israel. It was such a small country when it began. If the Arab leaders had had any kind of human goodness in them, they could have said, these people have been through hell. Let's treat them with Islamic courtesy, the way we are supposed to treat strangers. Instead they declared them the enemy. The Israelis had no choice but to become strong and to get allied with us. In the course of doing so, some of the best aspects of the Jewish nature—irony, the love of truth, the love of wisdom and justice, suffered internal depredations. Once it was a matter of saving their country, everything changed. Quantity changes quality, which may be the best three words Engels ever wrote. Quantity changes quality. As the Israelis became tougher, so they lost any hard-earned and elevated objectivity, any high and disinterested search for social value. The logo became Israel, my Israel. That was inevitable. It is also tragic, I think. Israel is now one more powerhouse in the world. But what they've lost is special. Now, they treat the Palestinians as if the Palestinians were ghetto Jews. It is one of the great ironies. You know, the older you get, the more you begin to depend upon irony as the last human element you can rely on. Whatever exists will, sooner or later, be turned inside out."

=== Spirituality and the human condition ===
As Mailer aged, his exploration of existential themes grew increasingly spiritual, reflecting a search for meaning and redemption. This is especially apparent in The Gospel According to the Son (1997), where he reimagines the story of Jesus from a first-person perspective, contemplating the nature of sin, grace, and redemption. Mailer's evolving interest in spirituality demonstrates his shift from existential angst to a more contemplative stance on the mysteries of human existence.

Mailer saw life as a spiritual and psychological journey, with death as the ultimate test of authenticity. He viewed writing as a means to confront mortality and explore divine questions, likening the writer's role to that of a prophet. His fascination with life and death extended to his personal philosophy, which embraced the idea of confronting one's fears to gain insight into the divine and the self.

=== Sexuality and gender dynamics ===
Mailer's works often present sexuality as a potent force, a battleground for power and transgression. His views on sexuality are vividly explored in The Prisoner of Sex (1971), where he famously counters feminist critiques, like that of Kate Millett, arguing that sexuality is inherently intertwined with both conflict and attraction. Millett critiques Mailer as a proponent of a "virility cult", emphasizing his portrayal of sex as an expression of power and violence, and he positions male sexuality as combative and inherently dominating. Although his views sparked criticism, Mailer believed that sexual dynamics reveal deep-seated truths about power and human nature.

Mailer's female characters are often depicted through archetypal lenses, reflecting his complex and often controversial views on women. For instance, in Marilyn (1973), Mailer portrays Marilyn Monroe as both a victim and an idealized figure of femininity, embodying vulnerability, allure, and the destructive side of fame and describes her as "one of the last of the cinema's aristocrats." This approach to female characters reveals Mailer's ambivalence toward gender roles, often portraying women as both sources of inspiration and existential challenge.

Critics like Joyce Carol Oates argued that Mailer's perspective, while ostensibly reverent toward femininity, ultimately "dehumanized" women by reducing them to carriers of biological destiny rather than as complex individuals with aspirations beyond motherhood and sexuality.

Power over bodies, societies, political entities, etc., reverberates throughout Mailer's work. In addition – and notable for such a prominent mainstream American writer of his generation – Mailer, throughout his work and personal communications, repeatedly expresses interest in, includes episodes of, or makes references to bisexuality or homosexuality. He directly addresses the subject publicly in his essay The Homosexual Villain, for One magazine.

=== Views on race ===
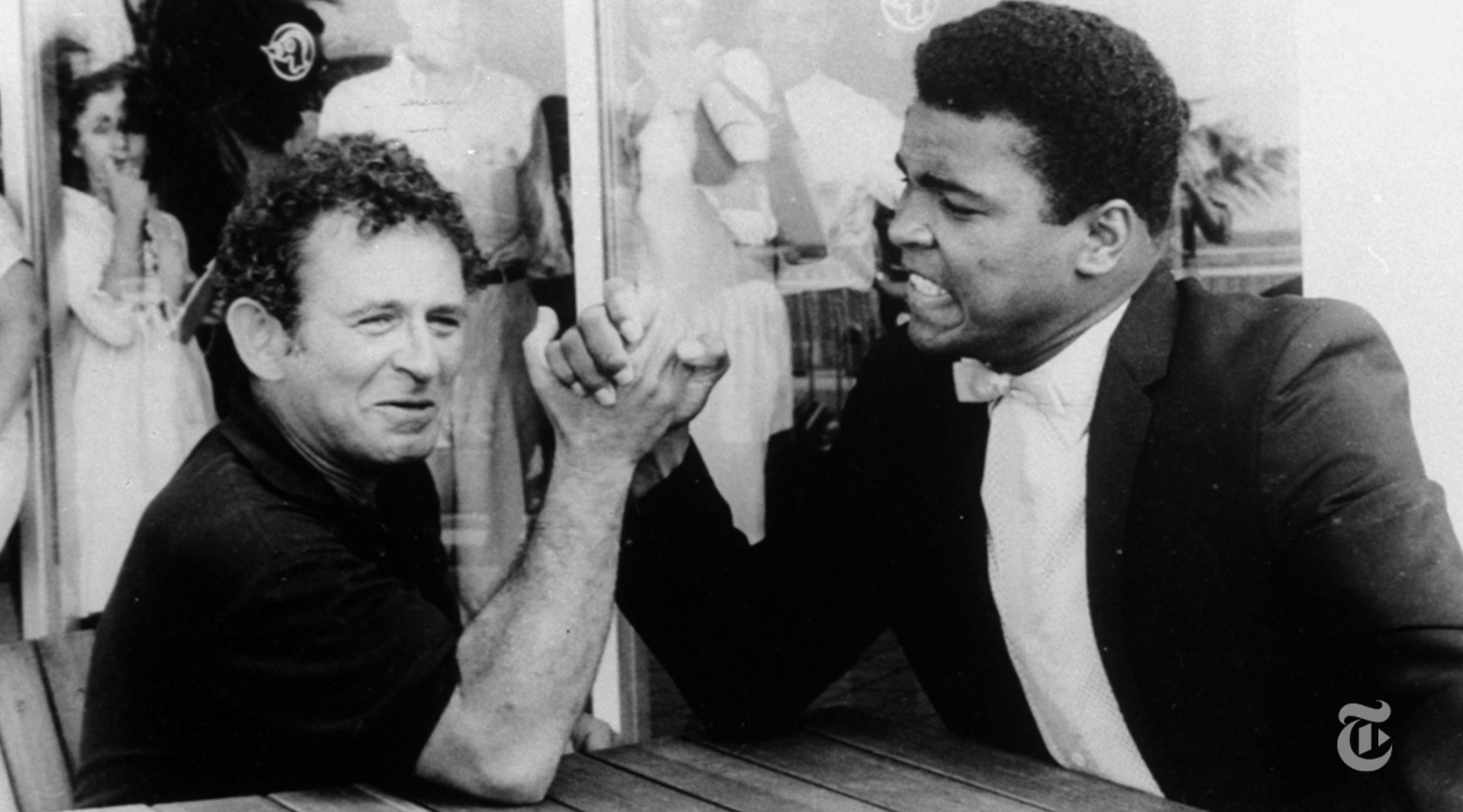
Norman (left) and Muhammad Ali (right)

Mailer focused on jazz as the ultimate expression of African-American bravado, and he represented musical figures such as Miles Davis in works including An American Dream. African-American men reflected a challenge to Mailer's own notions of masculinity.

While in Paris in 1956, Mailer met African-American author James Baldwin. Mailer became even more fascinated with African-Americans after meeting Baldwin, and this friendship inspired Mailer to write "The White Negro". To Mailer, Baldwin was a natural point of intrigue; Baldwin was gay, and his stature as an author was similar to Mailer's own.

== Personal life ==
=== Marriages and children ===
Mailer was married six times and had nine children. He fathered eight children by his wives.

Mailer's first marriage was to Beatrice Silverman. They eloped in January 1944 because neither family would likely have approved. They had one child, Susan, and divorced in 1952 because of Mailer's infidelities with Adele Morales.

Morales moved in with Mailer during 1951 into an apartment on First Avenue near Second Street in the East Village, and they married in 1954. They had two daughters, Danielle and Elizabeth. After hosting a party on Saturday, November 19, 1960, Mailer stabbed Adele twice with a two-and-a-half inch blade that he used to clean his nails, nearly killing her by puncturing her pericardium. He stabbed her once in the chest and once in the back, and initially ordered others not to help her. Adele required emergency surgery but made a quick recovery. Mailer claimed he had stabbed Adele "to relieve her of cancer". He was involuntarily committed to Bellevue Hospital for 17 days. While Adele did not press charges, saying she wanted to protect their daughters, Mailer later pleaded guilty to a reduced charge of assault saying, "I feel I did a lousy, dirty, cowardly thing", and received a suspended sentence of three years' probation. In 1962, the two divorced. In 1997, Adele published a memoir of their marriage entitled The Last Party, which recounted her husband stabbing her at a party and the aftermath. This incident has been a focal point for feminist critics of Mailer, who point to themes of sexual violence in his work.

His third wife, whom he married in 1962 and divorced in 1963, was the British heiress and journalist Lady Jeanne Campbell (1929–2007). She was the only daughter of Ian Campbell, 11th Duke of Argyll, a Scottish aristocrat and clan chief, and his first wife Janet Gladys Aitken, who was a daughter of press baron Max Aitken, 1st Baron Beaverbrook. The couple had a daughter, actress Kate Mailer.

His fourth marriage, in 1963, was to Beverly Bentley, a former model turned actress. She was the mother of two of his sons, producer Michael Mailer and actor Stephen Mailer. They divorced in 1980.

His fifth wife was Carol Stevens, a jazz singer whom he married on November 7, 1980, and divorced in Haiti on November 8, 1980, thereby legitimating their daughter Maggie, born in 1971.

His sixth and last wife, whom he married in 1980, was Norris Church Mailer (born Barbara Jean Davis, 1949–2010), an art teacher. They had one son together, John Buffalo Mailer, a writer and actor. Mailer raised Matthew Norris, Church's son by her first husband, Larry Norris. Living in Brooklyn, New York and Provincetown, Massachusetts with Mailer, Church worked as a model, wrote and painted.

=== Works with his children ===
In 2005, Mailer co-wrote a book with his youngest child, John Buffalo Mailer, titled The Big Empty. Mailer appeared in a 2004 episode of Gilmore Girls titled "Norman Mailer, I'm Pregnant!" with his son Stephen Mailer.

=== Other relationships ===
Over the course of his life, Mailer was connected with several women other than his wives, including Carole Mallory, who wrote a "tell all" biography, Loving Mailer, after his death.

In a chance meeting in an Upper East Side New York restaurant in 1982, Gloria Leonard first met Mailer. He struck up a conversation with Leonard after recognizing her. The meeting was rumored to have led to a brief affair between the two. Later, Leonard was approached by a group of movie distributors from the Midwest to finance what was described as "the world's first million-dollar pornographic movie". She invited Mailer to lunch and made her pitch for his services as a writer. In an interview Leonard said that the author "sat straight up in his chair and said, 'I always knew I'd one day make a porny.'" Leonard then asked what his fee would be and Mailer responded with "Two-hundred fifty thousand". Leonard then asked if he'd be interested in adapting his novel-biography of Marilyn Monroe, but Mailer replied that he wanted to do something original. The project later ended due to scheduling conflicts between the two.

=== Personality ===
At the December 15, 1971 taping of The Dick Cavett Show with Janet Flanner and Gore Vidal, Mailer, annoyed with a less-than-stellar review by Vidal of Prisoner of Sex, allegedly insulted and head-butted Vidal backstage. As the show began taping a visibly belligerent Mailer, who admitted he had been drinking, goaded Vidal and Cavett into trading insults with him on-air and referred to his own "greater intellect". He openly taunted and mocked Vidal, who responded in kind, and earned the ire of Flanner who announced during the discussion that she was "...becoming very, very bored..." Flanner told Mailer and Vidal "...you act as if you're the only people here." As Cavett made jokes comparing Mailer's intellect to his ego, Mailer stated "Why don't you look at your question sheet and ask your question?", to which Cavett responded "Why don't you fold it five ways and put it where the moon don't shine?" A long laugh ensued after which Mailer asked Cavett if he had come up with that line. Cavett replied "I have to tell you a quote from Tolstoy?" The head-butting and later on-air altercation was described by Mailer himself in his essay "Of a Small and Modest Malignancy, Wicked and Bristling with Dots".

According to his obituary in The Independent, his "relentless machismo seemed out of place in a man who was actually quite small – though perhaps that was where the aggression originated."

Alan Dershowitz, in his book, Taking the Stand, recounts when Claus von Bülow had a dinner party after he was found not guilty at his trial. Dershowitz countered that he would not attend if it was a "victory party", and von Bülow assured him that it was only a dinner for "several interesting friends". Norman Mailer attended the dinner where, among other things, Dershowitz explained why the evidence pointed to von Bülow's innocence. As Dershowitz recounted, Mailer grabbed his wife's arm, and said: "Let's get out of here. I think this guy is innocent. I thought we were going to be having dinner with a man who actually tried to kill his wife. This is boring."

== Death ==
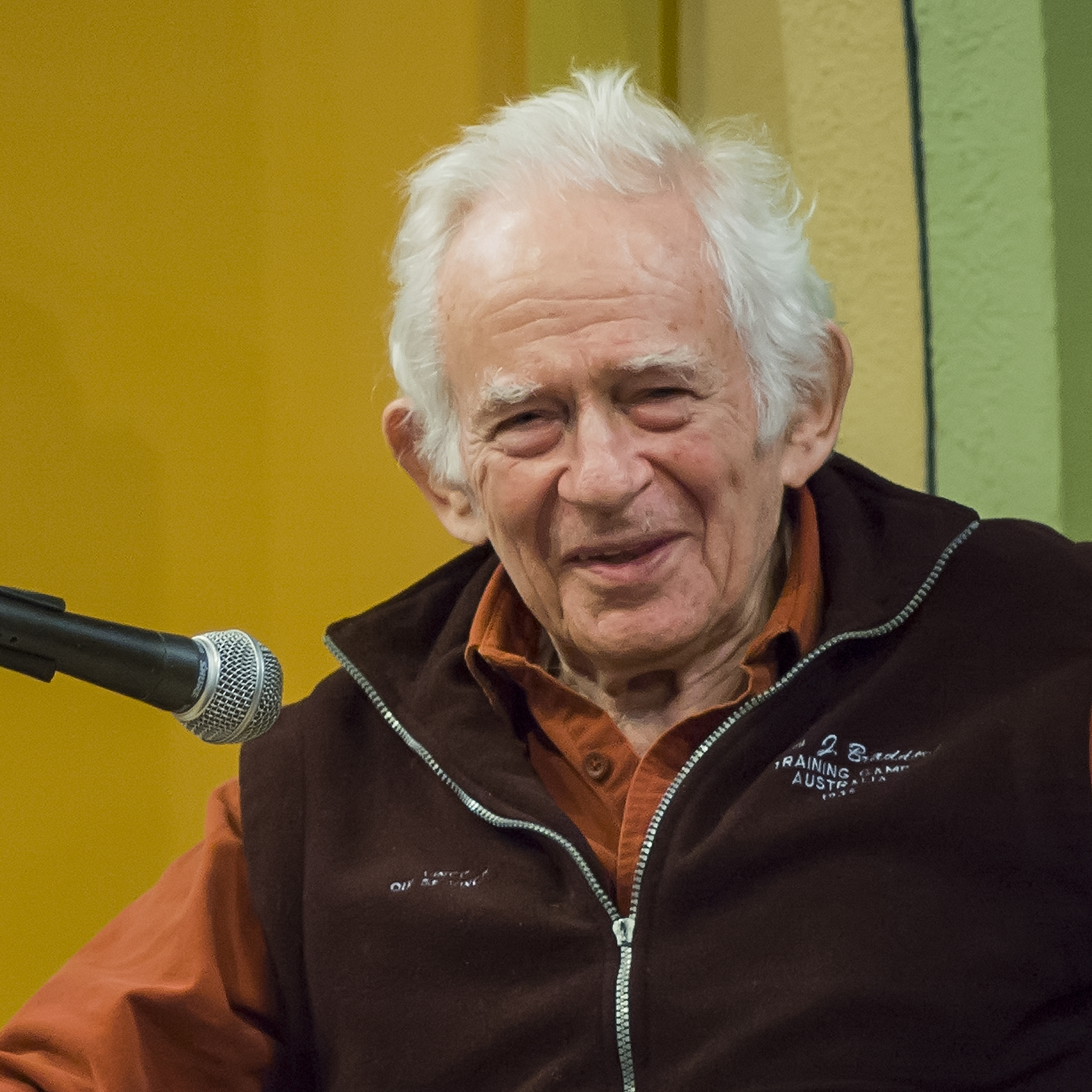
Mailer in 2006

Mailer died of acute renal failure on November 10, 2007, a month after undergoing lung surgery at Mount Sinai Hospital in Manhattan, aged 84. He is buried in Provincetown Cemetery, Provincetown, Massachusetts.

== Legacy ==
Mailer was nominated for the Nobel Prize in Literature several times, and on the Nobel committee's shortlist at least once, in 1974.

Mailer was referenced in the lyrics to the song "Vlad the Impaler" by American shock-rock heavy metal band GWAR on their 1990 album Scumdogs of the Universe.

More than a thousand boxes of Mailer's papers are housed at the Harry Ransom Center at the University of Texas, Austin.

In 2003, the Norman Mailer Society was founded to help ensure the legacy of Mailer's work. In 2008, The Norman Mailer Center and The Norman Mailer Writers Colony, a non-profit organization for educational purposes, was established to honor Mailer. Among its programs is the Norman Mailer Prize established in 2009. In 2008, Carole Mallory, a former mistress, sold seven boxes of documents and photographs to Harvard University, Mailer's alma mater. They contain extracts of her letters, books and journals.

Throughout his lifetime, Mailer wrote more than 45,000 letters. In 2014, Mailer's biographer J. Michael Lennon chose 712 of those letters and published them in Selected Letters of Norman Mailer, which covers the period between the 1940s and the early 2000s.

In March 2018, the Library of America published a two-volume collection of Mailer's works from the sixties: Four Books of the 1960s and Collected Essays of the 1960s. Critic David Denby suggests that based on Mailer's observations about the fractured political atmosphere in America that led to the 1967 march on the Pentagon, Mailer's work seems to be as relevant today as it was fifty years ago and that "Mailer may be due for reappraisal and revival."

Co-directed by artist and filmmaker Matthew Barney and composer–director Jonathan Bepler, the 2014 American epic avant-garde opera film River of Fundament is a radical, surreal, and metafictional reimagining of Mailer's fiction with a run-time of roughly five and a half hours. The film, in part a mythical-fantastical ode or tribute to Mailer, blends elements of Mailer's narrative works with references to events of his real life and personal experiences, as well as his literary and cultural impact, while examining and displaying motifs of filth, heavy industry, consumerism, waste, and technology.

In May 2018, the Norman Mailer Society and the city of Long Branch, New Jersey co-sponsored the installation of a bronze plaque where the Mailer family's Queen-Anne style hotel, the Scarboro, used to stand on the city's beachfront.

In October 2019, Wilkes University's Farley Library opened a replica of Mailer's last study in Provincetown, Massachusetts, replete with "some of his private library, manuscripts and revisions dating from 1984 as well as his studio furniture". The archive also houses Mailer's entire 4,000-volume library from his home in Brooklyn and an original portrait of Mailer by painter Nancy Ellen Craig donated by Mailer's daughter Danielle. The room opened with an event on October 10, 2019, to coincide with the annual conference of the Norman Mailer Society and was attended by several members of Mailer's family.

In 2019, Susan Mailer, Norman's eldest daughter, published a memoir about her relationship with her father. In Another Place: With and Without My Father Norman Mailer explores her "intense and complex" relationship with her father and the extended Mailer family. Reviewer Nicole DePolo writes that Susan Mailer, a psychoanalyst, provides sharp insights about her father in "crisp, vibrant prose that captures the essence of moments that are both remarkable and universally resonant".

In 2023, How to Come Alive with Norman Mailer, a documentary by Jeff Zimbalist, was released.

== Works ==
Novels

- The Naked and the Dead. New York: Rinehart, 1948.
- Barbary Shore. New York: Rinehart, 1951.
- The Deer Park. New York: Putnam's, 1955.
- An American Dream. New York: Dial, 1965.
- Why Are We in Vietnam? New York: Putnam, 1967.
- A Transit to Narcissus. New York: Howard Fertig, 1978.
- The Executioner's Song Boston: Little, Brown and Company, 1979.
- Of Women and Their Elegance. New York, Simon and Schuster, 1980.
- Ancient Evenings. Boston: Little, Brown, 1983.
- Tough Guys Don't Dance. New York: Random House, 1984.
- Harlot's Ghost. New York: Random House, 1991.
- The Gospel According to the Son. New York: Random House, 1997.
- The Castle in the Forest. New York: Random House, 2007.

Plays and screenplays

- The Deer Park: A Play. New York: Dial, 1967.
- Maidstone: A Mystery. New York: New American Library, 1971.

Short Stories

- The Short Fiction of Norman Mailer. New York: Dell, 1967.

Poetry

- Deaths for the Ladies (And Other Disasters). New York: Putman, 1962.
- Modest Gifts: Poems and Drawings. New York: Random House, 2003.

Essays

- "The White Negro." San Francisco: City Lights, 1957.
- The Bullfight: A Photographic Narrative with Text by Norman Mailer. New York: Macmillan, 1967.
- The Prisoner of Sex. Boston: Little, Brown, 1971.
- The Faith of Graffiti. New York: Praeger, 1974.
- Genius and Lust: A Journey through the Major Writings of Henry Miller. New York: Grove, 1976.
- Why Are We At War? New York: Random House, 2003.

Letters

- Norman Mailer's Letters on An American Dream, 1963-1969. Shavertown, PA: Sligo Press, 2004.
- The Selected Letters of Norman Mailer. New York: Random House, 2014.

Nonfiction narratives

- The Armies of the Night. New York: New American Library, 1968.
- The Idol and the Octopus: Political Writings on the Kennedy and Johnson Administrations. New York: Dell, 1968.
- Miami and the Siege of Chicago: An Informal History of the Republican and Democratic Conventions of 1968. New York: New American Library, 1968.
- Of a Fire on the Moon. Boston: Little, Brown, 1971.
- King of the Hill: Norman Mailer on the Fight of the Century. New York: New American Library, 1971.
- St. George and The Godfather. New York: Signet Classics, 1972.
- The Fight. Boston: Little, Brown and Company, 1975.
- Of a Small and Modest Malignancy, Wicked and Bristling with Dots. Northridge, CA: Lord John Press, 1980.
- Oswald's Tale: An American Mystery. New York: Random House, 1995.

Miscellanies, anthologies, and collections

- Advertisements for Myself. New York: Putnam, 1959.
- The Presidential Papers. New York: Putnam, 1963.
- Cannibals and Christians. New York: Dial, 1966.
- The Long Patrol: 25 Years of Writing from the Work of Norman Mailer. New York: World, 1971.
- Existential Errands. Boston: Little, Brown, 1972.
- Some Honorable Men: Political Conventions, 1960-1972. Boston: Little, Brown, 1976.
- Pieces and Pontifications. Boston: Little, Brown and Company, 1982.
- Conversations with Norman Mailer. Jackson: University Press of Mississippi, 1988.
- The Time of Our Time. New York: Random House, 1998.
- The Spooky Art: Some Thoughts on Writing. New York: Random House, 2003.
- The Big Empty. New York: Nation Books, 2006.
- On God: An Uncommon Conversation. With J. Michael Lennon. New York: Random House, 2007.
- Lipton's: A Marijuana Journal. New York: Arcade, 2024.

Biographies

- Marilyn: A Biography. New York: Grosset & Dunlap, 1973.
- Portrait of Picasso as a Young Man: An Interpretive Biography. Atlantic Monthly Press, 1995.
- Oswald's Tale: An American Mystery. New York: Random House, 1996.

== Decorations and awards ==
- 1969: Pulitzer Prize, George Polk Award, and National Book Award for The Armies of the Night; Honorary Doctor of Letters from Rutgers University
- 1970: Harvard University's Signet Society Medal for Achievement in the Arts
- 1973: Edward MacDowell Medal
- 1975: Playboy's Best Nonfiction Award for The Fight
- 1976: Gold Medal for Literature by the National Arts Club; Playboy's Best Major Work in Fiction Award
- 1979: Best Major Work in Fiction Award from Playboy for The Executioner's Song
- 1980: Pulitzer Prize for Executioner's Song
- 1984: Honorary Doctor of Letters from Mercy College in White Plains, NY; Inducted into the American Academy of Arts and Letters
- 1985: Lord and Taylor's Rose Award
- 1987: Independent Spirit Award for best film and Golden Raspberry Award for Worst Director (both for Tough Guys Don't Dance)
- 1989: PEN Oakland / Josephine Miles Award; Emerson-Thoreau Medal
- 1991: New York State Edith Wharton Citation of Merit
- 1994: Harvard University's Signet Society Medal for Achievement in the Arts
- 1995: Honorary Doctor of Letters from Wilkes University, in Wilkes-Barre, PA
- 2000: F. Scott Fitzgerald Award for Achievement in American Literature
- 2002: Lifetime Achievement Award from the James Jones Literary Society, June 22; Austrian Cross of Honour for Science and Art, 1st class
- 2004: Golden Plate Award of the American Academy of Achievement
- 2005: National Book Award for Distinguished Contribution to American Letters

== See also ==
- List of peace activists
