= Strawhead =

Play written by Norman Mailer and Richard Hannum

- Original language: English
- Written by: Norman Mailer; Richard Hannum
- Characters: Marilyn; Mr. Charles; Joe DiMaggio; Arthur Miller
- Subject: Fictional account of the last few days of Marilyn Monroe's life
- Genre: Drama
- Setting: New York City, August 1962

Premiere
- Date: 1986
- Place: Actors Studio, New York City, United States

Strawhead is a play by American writers Norman Mailer and Richard Hannum about Marilyn Monroe. The play is an adaptation of Mailer's 1980 book Of Women and Their Elegance, an imagined memoir told in Monroe's voice.

Strawhead takes place in New York City during the last few days of Monroe's life in August 1962. During this period, she is alone with her memories, most of which revolve around her time living in New York City. The play is primarily composed of a collection of imagined interviews, that never took place, between Monroe and Mailer during Monroe's last hours.

The play made its off-Broadway debut in January 1986, with Mailer's wife Norris Church in the cast and his daughter Kate Mailer in the role of Monroe. Kate Mailer also appeared on the April 1986 cover of Vanity Fair as the Monroe character in Strawhead.

== Development ==
In 1967, Norman Mailer had adapted his 1955 novel The Deer Park for an Off Broadway production. Thirteen years later, in 1980, Norman Mailer's agent informed Mailer that Richard Hannum, then a Manhattan roommate of Godspell creator John-Michael Tebelak, American Pulitzer Prize-winning film critic Stephen Hunter, and film director and composer Tom O'Horgan were interested in a stage adaptation of Mailer's 1980 book, Of Women and Their Elegance. Mailer agreed to work on the play since it would be a pleasant diversion: "Novel writing is a lonely business. Lonely business quickly becomes grim. In theater you're working with people. The climate is a lot warmer."

The stage adaptation was Mailer's second foray into the theater behind the adaptation of The Deer Park. The play takes its title from an FBI code name for Monroe. According to Mailer, Strawhead represents "(Marilyn's) ironic, whimsical, tortured way of thinking." Mailer sees the fictional Monroe character in the play as "having an immensely dialectical mind; no sooner does she have a thought, than she comes on its opposite. That's the way life presents itself to her - in contrasts and sudden shifts."

In January 1981, Hannum and Hunter were listed as the producers of the play and O'Horgan was listed as the director. At that time, Mailer had hoped that the play would open on Broadway in the spring 1981 or the fall 1981, but had not yet cast the Monroe character. In addition, Hannum still was working on the play construction and Mailer was working on the play dialogue from his writing desk in Brooklyn Heights, Brooklyn.

To move the script along, Mailer presented the beginnings of Strawhead for critique to the Actors Studio Playwright And Directors Unit, an exclusive group to which Mailer belonged. The early draft had a clichéd Monroe giving a blowjob to the Mailer-interviewer character. In response to former Marilyn Monroe roommate and Academy Award winning actress Shelley Winters blasting Mailer's effort, Mailer rewrote the part to be a burly Maileresque feminist who burst into the play from the audience.

== Production ==
With the script finished, Mailer and the others set out to find the lead actress for the play. In October 1982, Mailer was attending a Park Avenue dinner party given by Claus von Bülow, who at that time was on trial for the attempted murder of von Bülow's wife, Sunny, and had been out of jail only two days on US$1 million bail. Also attending the party was Australian-based theatre actress Kate Fitzpatrick. Fitzpatrick was introduce to Mailer and spoke with Mailer during dinner after Mailer swapped the place cards to seat Fitzpatrick beside him. After deciding that Fitzpatrick was perfect to play Marilyn Monroe in Strawhead, Mailer, Hunter, and Hannum met with Fitzpatrick to give her the script. Fitzpatrick turned down the part, since she already was committed to playing Marilyn Monroe in Terry Johnson's 1982 play, Insignificance.

The producers made additional efforts to find a noted actor to play the lead role. Prior to 1983, Mailer, Hunter, and Hannum also courted American actress Susan Sarandon to play the Marilyn Monroe character. Sarandon declined the lead role with the query, "Why should I perpetuate someone else's legend when I should be creating my own?"

On March 7, 1983, the American Repertory Theatre at Mailer's alma mater Harvard University in Cambridge, Massachusetts, presented a staged reading of Strawhead. The presentation was part of the theaters noted Monday night series at the Loeb Drama Center. ART actor Karen MacDonald played the lead role. At this point, the play was an unproduced spec script, Mailer thought the play needed trimming, and there were no immediate plans to produce Strawhead.

In June 1983, it was announced that Strawhead would be produced by Marshall Oglesby at Provincetown Playhouse in Manhattan. At Mailer's recommendation, Oglesby selected ART actor Karen MacDonald to play the Monroe character. In late August 1983, Strawhead was presented at Provincetown Playhouse.

In November 1985, Mailer brought his play to the Actors Studio, an Off Broadway theater and school that gained worldwide recognition under the leadership of Lee Strasberg. The scenes presented were workshop scenes and Mailer put himself in position of director of the two-act production. In addition to the cast including Robert Heller, Mickey Knox and Patrick Sullivan, Mailer added his wife Norris Church to the cast. There was no admission charge to the workshop.

== Debut and aftermath ==
In January 1986, Strawhead was debuted in full at the Actors Studio, with actor and playwright John Jiler playing Mr. Charles. American playwright and critic Bonnie Greer, who shared a close relationship to Mailer and reviewed an initial version of the play, stated that what Mailer put on stage ultimately was not Monroe. Rather, the play was more about "chronicling all Mailer's life as The Great, White, Male Heterosexual, "Big Daddy", "The Man.""

In April 1986, it was first reported that Mailer's daughter Kate Mailer was added to the cast in the lead role. The choice was in interesting one since the play characterizes a fictional interaction between Monroe and Mailer and an early draft had a clichéd Monroe giving a blowjob to the Mailer-interviewer character. In explaining Mailer's choice of casting his 23-year-old, unknown actress daughter in his play, Mailer stated, "She was the best prep-school actress I'd ever seen." To bring publicity to the play and to sell the Vanity Fair magazine, Kate Mailer appeared on the April 1986 Vanity Fair cover as the Marilyn Monroe character in Strawhead. In October 1987, the New York Times describe Kate Mailer's portrayal of Monroe as teenage punk rocker who is "less identified with her role."

After the 1986 performances, the commercial performance of Strawhead all but disappeared. In her 2005 book The Many Lives of Marilyn Monroe, author Sarah Churchwell notes that Strawhead was a commercial failure.

In April 2008, Harvard University received the papers of the co-author of the play, Richard G. Hannum, formerly a resident of Sebastian, Florida. Included with those papers were correspondence with Mailer and drafts and final script for Strawhead. The drafts and final script evidence the literary techniques used in Strawhead and Mailer's efforts to continually improve his own writing for Strawhead and that of Hannums. Importantly, they convey research and teaching about how the style and substance of Strawhead was developed through layers of revision.

== See also ==
- After the Fall – Play by Monroe's ex-husband Arthur Miller, uses the Monroe persona as a character
- Finishing the Picture – Play by Monroe's ex-husband Arthur Miller, uses the Monroe persona as a character
- Insignificance – Play by Terry Johnson, Monroe's persona serves as the unnamed Actress
- Will Success Spoil Rock Hunter?: 1955 play, Rita Marlowe character is an exaggerated lampoon of Monroe
