= Oswald's Tale =

1995 book by Norman Mailer

Oswald's Tale: An American Mystery
- First edition cover
- Author: Norman Mailer
- Subject: Lee Harvey Oswald
- Genre: Biography
- Publisher: Random House
- Publication date: 1995
- Publication place: United States
- Pages: 791 (hardcover first edition)
- ISBN: 0-679-42535-7

Oswald's Tale: An American Mystery is a 1995 non-fiction book by Norman Mailer. It amounts to a detailed biography of Lee Harvey Oswald (1939–1963), the assassin of U.S. President John F. Kennedy.

== Summary ==
The book includes an exhaustive examination of Oswald's movements over the years, particularly in Minsk, and in the months leading up to Kennedy's assassination on November 22, 1963, and Oswald's own murder two days later. Knitted into the story of Oswald's life are Mailer's suppositions on his state of mind and motivations. The Oswald that Mailer depicts is a single-minded and vain individual convinced of his own destiny and importance who suffers a series of defeats and frustrations, and who killed the President in a desperate search for achievement.

When Oswald returns to Dallas in 1963 with his wife and daughter, he still has dreams, still sees himself as "an instrument of history," and is still frustrated and unhappy. His April 1963 assassination attempt on General Edwin Walker, a John Birch Society supporter, shows him acting out his belief that he is an instrument of history in the months leading up to November 22, 1963.

Six months after the assassination attempt of Walker, Oswald takes advantage of the accident of history that has brought Kennedy's motorcade past the window of the Texas School Book Depository where he works, and he acts out his self-declared destiny.

== Reviews ==
Kirkus Reviews wrote: "Combining the tedious and the sublime in quintessential Mailer fashion, the text reconstructs Oswald the cipher and pawn, replacing him with Oswald the ideological aspirant with an almost occult belief in his destiny. Judicious, painstaking, and imaginative, this should be a central book in a growing and undependable canon." Publishers Weekly said Mailer's "unconvincing analysis emerges from a labyrinthine pastiche of KGB and FBI transcripts, recorded dialogues, speculations, Oswald's letters and diary excerpts, and government memos." Giving the book a grade of "B", L.S. Klepp of Entertainment Weekly wrote that Mailer "makes Oswald a deeper, more imposing figure than he has seemed to be. It doesn’t work. Yet the book that Mailer has poised on this flawed premise is still full of interest."

Michiko Kakutani of The New York Times described Oswald's Tale as a "long-winded and ultimately superfluous book". According to Kakutani: "Mr. Mailer declines to use his enormous gifts as a reporter and novelist to create an unvarnished portrait of his subject (the way he did with Gary Gilmore in his 1979 masterpiece, The Executioner's Song), but instead clumsily tries to force his material into an unyielding cookie-cutter shape. The result is a book that succeeds simultaneously in being boring and presumptuous, derivative and solipsistic." She also wrote: "Mr. Mailer willfully veers even further into the realm of imaginative fancy than Don DeLillo did in his powerful 1988 Oswald novel Libra." Also writing for The New York Times, Thomas Powers described the work as "marvelous". Powers writes, "All of this is described wonderfully well. Mailer's account adds many new characters and incidents to the story told by Ms. McMillan, but it is also distinguished by a brilliant linguistic invention, a kind of Mailer-patent Russian-English that captures Russian rhythms not only of language but also of thinking and feeling about love, work and the ways of the world."
