= Of Women and Their Elegance =

First edition (publ. Simon & Schuster)

Of Women and Their Elegance is an imaginary memoir about Marilyn Monroe by Norman Mailer. The book uses photographs taken by Milton H. Greene in combination with real interviews of Monroe and fictional events that Mailer invents. The book, written entirely in first person, purports to express the innermost thoughts of Monroe. There are also photos by Greene of other celebrities like Audrey Hepburn, Judy Garland, Ava Gardner, and Jane Fonda.

The majority of the book is centered on Monroe's conversations and interactions with Greene and Arthur Miller, her third husband. There are no interactions between Mailer and Monroe in the book. It was published in 1980, eighteen years after Monroe's death. Mailer never met Monroe in real life, but this was the second book that he has published about her. The first was Marilyn: A Biography in 1973.

== Reception ==
Mailer anticipated criticism for writing an imaginary memoir about Monroe, so in the November 10, 1980, issue of New York Magazine, he wrote a piece defending Of Women and Their Elegance. He wrote, "Before the Literary Bar: In which the author puts his new Marilyn Monroe book on trial—before critics do." He wrote the article as if it was a transcript from a courtroom defending his work. At the end of the work The Court says, "I will say that I have read the book and consider it a serious enough work to give Mr. Mailer a fair opportunity of avoiding outright censure." Mailer stated that he knew he would receive backlash for creating fictional interviews and stories as if they were real but that he wanted readers not to dismiss his work before they had read it.
