= The Fight (book) =

1975 non-fiction book by Norman Mailer

- First edition
- Author: Norman Mailer
- Language: English
- Genre: Non fiction
- Publisher: Little, Brown
- Publication date: 1975
- Publication place: United States
- Media type: Print
- Pages: 234 pages
- ISBN: 0-375-70038-2

The Fight is a 1975 non-fiction book by Norman Mailer about the boxing title fight between Muhammad Ali and George Foreman at Kinshasa in Zaire in 1974, known as the "Rumble in the Jungle".

== Summary ==
The author is both the narrator and, in an example of illeism, a central figure in the story. To begin with, "Norman" goes to Ali's training camp at Deer Lake, Pennsylvania and observes his preparations. Clearly, Ali is his hero. He meets his entourage, among them Bundini, and the sparring partners such as Larry Holmes, Eddie Jones, and Roy Williams. The next scene is in Kinshasa where President Mobutu of Zaire has underwritten the fight, a showcase of "Black honour", a victory for "Mobutuism". Ali is stationed at Nsele and getting ready. The fight, however, is postponed when Foreman incurs a cut during his training. "Norman" can go back to the United States.

One month later, Mailer is back in Kinshasa, staying at the Inter-Continental hotel where most of George Foreman's people are staying as well, also the promoters, and even some of Ali's retinue. Mailer glows in the admiration of the black Americans: "A man of wisdom" (Ali), "the champ among writers" (Foreman), "a genius" (Don King). He reads "Bantu Philosophy" and learns that "humans (are) forces, not beings".

Mailer meets Foreman and is startled by his reception, "Excuse me for not shaking hands with you, but you see I am keeping my hands in my pockets". Foreman works with Sandy Saddler, Dick Sadler, Archie Moore, Sugar Ray Robinson, and Terry Lee. Mailer has access to Ali's preparations at Nsele, and, on one occasion, is allowed to accompany Ali on his early morning run but not able to complete the full exercise. The encounters with various characters of the retinues fascinate Mailer. The balconies of the hotel have no railings, and on one night, after drinking with Don King, Mailer challenges himself to go on the balcony and climb around its partition to the next balcony. He ponders what could have happened, "How ridiculous a way to get yourself killed".

The evening before the fight Mailer has a beer with George Plimpton, who covers the fight for Sports Illustrated before attending the press meeting of Foreman at the Hotel Memling. Then Plimpton and he set out for Ali's place to join his retinue. At 2 AM, they all leave for the stadium where the fight is scheduled to start two hours later. In Ali's dressing room, Mailer observes the mood.

He describes the dynamics of the fight in detail comparing it to a chess match and to a piece of art. He notes that Angelo Dundee loosens the tightness of the ropes to allow Ali to lean back more when doing his "rope-a-dope". During the fight Foreman grows increasingly weary, allowing Ali to take control of the bout and knock him out. Mailer states that the countdown by the referee Zack Clayton was correct and went to "ten".

After the fight, the tropical rain starts, the parties depart, and Mailer goes to Nsele to bid goodbye to Ali. When flying back, Mailer's plane is briefly detained at Dakar, as the jubilant crowd expects Ali to be aboard. Mailer concludes the book with an African tale.

== "The Executioner's Song" ==
The title of the chapter where Ali takes control of the fight and wins is "The Executioner's Song". Mailer had used the title in one of his earlier poems, published in Fuck You magazine in September 1964, reprinted in Cannibals and Christians (1966). He reused this title later for his 1979 novel.

== Themes ==
Throughout Norman Mailer's foray into sports journalism he focuses on a variety of topics both within and outside of the boxing ring.

=== Theatre of Boxing ===
The Theatre of Boxing is a major focus of The Fight. The presentation and behavior of both Muhammad Ali and George Foreman leading up to "The Rumble in the Jungle" is a major focus of the book. From the beginning of the book, Mailer analyzes the demeanor and appearances of both boxers. When discussing the famed trash talking antics of Ali, he states that they are imperative to his success in the ring, "If, when speaking to the press, a harsh and hysterical tone entered his voice as easily as other men light a cigarette, he was never frantic in the ring..." Ali's antics are a focal point in the buildup to the fight for this reason as he was at his best outside of the ring. Although he seemed to be struggling during training sessions that Mailer attended, Ali was at his trash talking best from his poetry and showmanship at his Deer Lake training facility to things as simple as his post-sparring press conferences. George Foreman was portrayed as the antithesis of Ali as he was not big on the theatrics of sports entertainment and as a whole was a more subdued human being. Mailer details his first interaction with Foreman in the lobby of the Inter-Continental describing how, unlike Ali, who would have turned the interaction into a spectacle, Foreman simply kept his hands in his pockets and spoke in a soft, Texas manner. Foreman's interactions with the press were not ones born of arrogance but from a humble perspective in which he trained to his pop music and "hoped" to knock out Ali. Mailer equates this fight to a war of religion which can be taken literally or figuratively as it was Ali's Muslim beliefs that helped him criticize America vs. Foreman's Christian beliefs that made him prideful of his country but it was also a war between Foreman's humble approach and Ali's crowd pleasing trash talk approach that made Ali so popular in Africa that made Mailer believe that “if Ali can’t win in Africa, he can’t win anywhere.”

=== Blackness and Mailer's battle with it ===
Blackness and Mailer's battle with it is an underlying theme throughout The Fight. Mailer, whether right or wrong, takes on the task of comparing the blackness of George Foreman and Muhammad Ali while also evaluating how comfortable he is navigating black spaces. This has been a theme in other works of Mailer such as The White Negro. Mailer was accepted by both camps, especially Ali's camp, so much so that Mailer got to go on a training run with Ali. This being said, Mailer feels a bit of guilt profiting off of the work of black people especially now when he was at the forefront of two of the biggest Black figures at the time. This was partially due to his own personal battles during a highly racialized period of history, coming out when the Civil Rights Movement and Black Power movements were still prevalent. He loved the “Black soul” but he states, “He no longer knew whether he loved Blacks or secretly disliked them, which had to be one of the dirtiest secrets of his American life,” as he looked for a justifiable reason to hate Black people but constantly being reminded of how much he loved Black people. The hate was mostly that of self-hate but through his form of self-hatred, he was able to tell a hole-filled, biased form of African-American history that discussed how American Blacks were disadvantaged because during slavery they were snatched from their heritage. Mailer constantly attempts to understand the American Black psyche as he not only compares them to themselves but to the African Blacks which he deems American Blacks have become very judgmental of. The comparison of Blackness carried over into his opinions on Foreman and Ali. Mailer believed that Foreman was “more Black” due to his ability to potentially be mistaken as an African himself. This observation comes after Mailer's detailed description of Foreman's physical build and demeanor. This evaluation was in staunch contrast to Muhammad Ali who he states had to have some “white blood” in him due to his personality, in Mailer's opinion, being reminiscent of a Southern college fraternity president. “Ali was like nothing so much as a white actor who had put on too little make up for the part and was not wholly convincing as a Black,” Mailer states in his typical problematic fashion. Remarks like these hang over the narrative of the book as the reader is left to interpret whether Mailer is racist while also getting to know both fighters through a racialized lens.

=== Bantu philosophy ===
Bantu philosophy is a theme Mailer weaves into The Fight by connecting aspects and events from “The Rumble in the Jungle” to this ancient philosophy founded by a Dutch missionary in the Belgian Congo. Mailer comes across the text after a visit to the University Place Book Shop in New York, where he wanted to learn a little bit more about Africa before he returned to Zaire to cover the fight. Bantu Philosophy was a book written by Father Tempels who was a Dutch priest who had worked as a missionary in the Belgian Congo and extracted the philosophy from the language of the tribes he lived with. Mailer in his reading comes to discover that the African Buntu philosophy of African tribesman was similar to his own personal philosophy, “Bantu Philosophy, he soon learned, saw humans as forces, not beings. Without putting it into words, he always believed that.” Once Mailer gained a better understanding of Bantu philosophy he began describing Foreman and Ali not as fighters but as forces. Mailer commits to the philosophy of boxers as forces stating, “Humans were not beings but forces. He would try to look at them [Ali and Foreman] by that light.” Mailer continues to use this Buntu philosophy of force to describe the fighters by introducing n’golo, which is Congolese for force. Mailer describes n’golo (force) as, “Equally could it be applied to ego, status, strength, or libido. Indubitably did Ali feel deprived of his rightful share.” Mailer used n’golo (force) demonstrating that Ali was deprived of this vast force that comes with being a champion. This fight however gave Ali a chance to regain the n’golo (force) that was currently consumed by Foreman as the champion. For example, Mailer also used Bantu philosophy describing Drew Bundini Brown, an assistant trainer and cornerman for Ali: “Bundini was the walking definition of the idea that each human is born with two souls… If Africans did not have this concept, one would have to invent it. What a clash of Nomo and n’golo. All that spirit and all that prick.” Mailer's use of Bantu philosophy to describe Bundini as a character that holds tremendous n’golo (force) as Ali's assistant trainer and cornerman, which has turned him into a “prick”. That is why Mailer uses the analogy of two souls to show the Nomo (spirit) Bundini had was being consumed by the n’golo (force) that comes with being assistant trainer and cornerman to Ali. Mailer again uses Bantu Philosophy by titling the second section of his novel n’golo (force). In the remaining chapters Mailer depicts the historic Ali vs. Foreman Rumble in the Jungle with round by round depictions of the boxers punches and movements in the ring. Mailer again incorporates Buntu Philosophy by depicting Foreman's demeanor in the latter rounds, “Something may have finally begun to go from Foreman’s n’golo, some departure of the essence of absolute rage, and Ali reaching over the barrage would give a prod now and again…” Here specifically but throughout the second section of the novel he depicts the battle between Ali's n’golo (force) and Foreman's n’golo (force). After the fight Mailer again uses Bantu Philosophy to describe the city of Zaire as he searches for transportation back to his hotel. Mailer writes “The damp air on this dawn is full of the n’golo of the living and the thirst of the dead.” Mailer wrote statements like these throughout The Fight and they demonstrate a theme of African philosophy which offers more understanding and background to one of the greatest boxing events ever held.

== Critical reception ==
Mailer, himself a boxing hobbyist, had been sent to Kinshasa and was part of the press corps. This and his personal connections gave him a unique access to the event. Christopher Lehmann-Haupt indicates that Mailer recalls the drama of the fight in an "exquisitely refined and attenuated" manner. We get to know, through Mailer's interactions, "the principals: Muhammad Ali himself, who comes across in these pages as a far more interesting and complex man than one would divine from seeing the interesting and complex public image; and George Foreman the champion, who is simply likable and terrifying." He commends Mailer for being able to describe the "pugilistic drama fully as exciting as the reality on which it is based." Michael Wood believes that "every page of the book … speaks implicitly of Mailer's dislike of blacks, converted into fascination and even affection by an act of sheer liberal will". A critical aspect of the book is that the writer puts himself right in the middle of it, or as he says: "Now our man of wisdom had a vice. He wrote about himself. Not only would he describe the events he saw, but his own small effect on events. This irritated critics. They spoke of ego trips and the unattractive dimensions of his narcissism." Mitrosilis comments that "Mailer observes the power and frailty of his own persona just as he does with the fighters and their cornermen… hiding nothing." To him it appears like "a near impossible task to lie on the couch and sit in the chair, the psychologist and the patient."
