= George Barris (photographer) =

American photographer and photojournalist

- Born: June 1, 1922
- Died: September 30, 2016 (aged 94)
- Occupation: Photographer

George Barris (June 14, 1922 – September 30, 2016) was an American photographer and photojournalist best known for his photographs of actress Marilyn Monroe. He was born in New York City to Romanian parents.

Barris had a lifelong interest in photography, and as a young man he worked for the U.S. Army's Office of Public Relations. Many of his photographs of General Dwight D. Eisenhower were published. After the war, he became a freelance photographer and found work in Hollywood. He photographed many stars of the 1950s and 1960s, including Elizabeth Taylor on the set of Cleopatra, Marlon Brando, Charlie Chaplin, Frank Sinatra, Clark Gable and Steve McQueen.

Barris is perhaps best known for his work with Marilyn Monroe, whom he photographed in 1954 on the set of The Seven Year Itch, and in 1962 at Santa Monica beach, and in the Hollywood Hills in a series that became known as "The Last Photos." Barris was collaborating on a book titled Marilyn: Her Life In Her Own Words at the time of her death. Barris is well known for taking the last photo of Monroe on July 13, 1962.

Barris died on September 30, 2016, at the age of 94.
