= The Presidential Papers =

Book by Norman Mailer

- First edition
- Author: Norman Mailer
- Language: English
- Publisher: G.P. Putnam's Sons
- Publication date: 1963

The Presidential Papers is a collection of essays, interviews, poems, open letters to political figures, and magazine pieces written by Norman Mailer, published in 1963 by G.P. Putnam's Sons. It is, by Mailer's own admission, similar in structure and purpose to Advertisements for Myself, albeit with a relatively stronger focus on contemporary politics, although many other topics are touched upon. The book covers such topics as scatology, totalitarianism, aesthetics, fascism, the 1960 Democratic National Convention in Los Angeles, Jean Genet's 1958 play The Blacks, juvenile delinquency, Jacqueline Kennedy Onassis, Fidel Castro, masturbation, and others.

== Reception ==
In 1964 Midge Decter published a review in Commentary which praised Mailer's earnest observation but criticised his "intellectual brashness." Despite chastising Mailer for not being "sufficiently respectful toward the history of man's difficulties with the problems raised in [The Presidential Papers]," Decter nonetheless concluded her review by claiming "no one else is telling us more about the United States of America."

In reviewing Mailer's personal political stance of 'left-conservativism,' Cyrus Zirakzadeh concluded that The Presidential Papers's most significant insight was that the United States has remained formally democratic but nonetheless developed a 'totalitarian culture,' a discussion found in The Ninth Presidential Paper. The primary culprit for this totalitarian culture is a technology-centered 'corporate capitalism' where employees become 'sycophants' for their employers, representing a serious threat to individual freedom. What results is a managed, predictable economic order that threatens the United States' unique history of opportunity, risk and fluid social structure.
