= Norris Church Mailer =

American writer; widow of Norman Mailer (1949–2010)

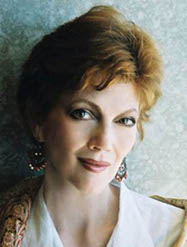
- Norris Church Mailer, 2000.
- Born: Barbara Jean Davis; January 31, 1949; Atkins, Arkansas, U.S.
- Died: November 21, 2010 (aged 61); New York City, U.S.
- Spouses: Larry Norris (m. 1969; div. 1975) Norman Mailer (m. 1980; died 2007)
- Children: Matthew Norris; John Buffalo

Norris Church Mailer (born Barbara Jean Davis; January 31, 1949 – November 21, 2010) was an American novelist, actress, artist, and model. Norris published two novels, Windchill Summer and Cheap Diamonds, and a memoir, A Ticket to the Circus, which focuses on her nearly thirty-year marriage to Norman Mailer.

== Early life ==
Barbara Jean Davis grew up in Atkins, Arkansas, where her mother owned the local beauty shop and her grandparents were sharecroppers. As a child, she was severely affected by her mother's bouts of depression and was hospitalized and given electroshock treatments. Davis and her family were simple country people who attended church faithfully. When she was twenty years old, she married her high school sweetheart, Larry Norris, and together they had one son, Matthew. By 1975, at just 25 years old, she had divorced her first husband and had worked several jobs including working in a pickle factory and as a bookkeeper. Shortly after her divorce from Norris, she claimed to have "had a fling" with future U.S. President Bill Clinton. Norris and her young son moved to Russellville, Arkansas and she explored her love of the arts by working as a high school art teacher; however, everything changed when she met Norman Mailer.

== Writing ==
Norris was interested in writing and wrote about a hundred pages of a novel loosely based on herself as a young girl growing up in Arkansas. Still in the early days of their relationship, Norris showed her rough draft to Mailer for his opinion, to which he responded, "It's not as bad as I thought it would be,” causing Norris to put her work aside for the next several decades. Years later, amidst a successful career as a Wilhelmina model and accomplished artist, Norris reshaped her rough draft into her first novel, Windchill Summer, which was published in 2000. Windchill Summer illustrates the challenges of a young girl struggling to grow up in Arkansas during the Vietnam War era. In 2007, Norris followed with the sequel, Cheap Diamonds, a story about a young woman leaving her small town home and moving to New York to become a model in the tumultuous 1970s. Church's last work was her own memoir, A Ticket to the Circus, published in 2010, explaining that the title described her life with Mailer, his seven children by his other wives, and her own two children: "Well, I bought a ticket to the circus. I don't know why I was surprised to see elephants."

== Life with Norman Mailer ==
Barbara Davis, then a single mother living in Russellville, Arkansas and teaching high-school art, met her soon-to-be second husband, Pulitzer Prize winning author Norman Mailer, at a book signing event. Although Mailer was married when she met him, she and her son moved to New York to continue her relationship with Mailer. Davis gave birth to a son with Mailer, John Buffalo Mailer, in 1978 and eventually married Mailer in 1980, becoming Mailer's sixth and final wife. She also became stepmother to two stepsons and five stepdaughters, and spent the next three decades juggling successful careers as an artist/actress/writer, managing her home life, and her husband's career demands.

She described Norman Mailer as "the Henry Higgins to my Eliza Doolittle," and often defended Norman against critics who claimed he was a misogynist; she also asked for his feedback on drafts of her novels, though his response was sometimes negative.

== Model, actress, and artist ==
After moving to New York, Barbara Davis changed her first name to Norris (her first husband's last name), and her middle name to Church as suggested by Mailer, who decided the name suitable because of her faithful attendance of church while growing up. Norris soon began a successful career as a Wilhelmina model. Although Norris Church Mailer dedicated much of her time during the 1980s to caring for her extended family, she had a keen interest in the arts and held several successful one-woman showings of her art and worked as an actress in several films and television. Mailer's work as an actress included Jet Lag (1981), Ragtime (1981), The Executioner's Song (1982), Exposed (1983) and Chinese Coffee (2000). In 2010, Mailer portrayed herself in the documentary, Norman Mailer: The American. She also played in the daytime soap All My Children.

== Health issues and death ==
In 2000, Norris was diagnosed with a malignant gastrointestinal stromal tumor and was told she would probably only live for two more years. Norris beat the odds and over the next 10 years had six major operations to fight the cancer, while taking care of her ailing husband. Norris died on November 21, 2010, aged 61, at her home in Brooklyn Heights in New York City.

== Legacy ==
On June 26, 2004, Wilkes University established the Norris Church Mailer Fellowship in Creative Writing. This is a summer workshop program to honor Norris Church Mailer as a writer and a board member. The workshop is an annual opportunity for creative writing students to receive financial assistance.

== Works cited ==
- Berger, Joseph (November 21, 2010). "Church Mailer, Artist and Ally, Dies". New York Times. Books.
- "Financial Aid & Scholarships". Wilkes.edu. Wilkes University. n.d.
- Harris, Ellen F. (2010). "The Norman Conquest, or The Last Wife of Norman Mailer". Belles Letters.
- Klemesrud, Judy (April 22, 1979). "Mailer's Latest Love Story". St. Louis Post-Dispatch. p. 3H.
- Lennon, J. Michael (2013). Norman Mailer: A Double Life. New York: Simon and Schuster. ISBN 978-1439150214. OCLC 873006264.
- Mansfield, Stephanie (January 26, 1986). "Norris Mailer Out of Arkansas, The Author's Sixth Wife, Her Art and Her Roots". Washington Post. pp. D1, D6.
- "Norris Church Mailer". NNDB.
- "Norris Mailer, 6th Wife of Norman Mailer, Dies". Tulsa World. Tulsa, OK. November 26, 2010.
- Witchel, Alex (March 29, 2010). "Norris Church Mailer: The Last Wife". New York Times Magazine.
