= The Gospel According to the Son =

1997 novel by Norman Mailer

- Cover of the first edition
- Author: Norman Mailer
- Language: English
- Publisher: Random House
- Publication date: 1997
- Publication place: United States
- Media type: Print (Hardback & Paperback)
- Pages: 242
- ISBN: 0-679-45783-6
- OCLC: 104948587

The Gospel According to the Son is a 1997 novel by Norman Mailer. It purports to be the story of Jesus Christ, told autobiographically.

== Plot summary ==
The novel employs first person story-telling from the perspective of Jesus. It stays nearly entirely true to the text of the four canonical gospels. Jesus tells his own story, from his birth to a teen-aged virgin named Mary to his execution by crucifixion at the hands of the Romans. Just as in the gospels, he is resurrected from the dead, and ascends to heaven.

== Critical reception ==
Critical response to Mailer's novel was mixed. Jack Miles, writing for Commonweal, found the book "a quiet, sweet, almost wan little book, a kindly offering from a New York Jew to his wife's Bible Belt family." He noted that there was "something undeniably impressive about the restraint" of the style that Mailer undertook in composing the novel. He concluded that the novel was neither one of Mailer's best works, nor would it stand out amongst the bibliography of books inspired by the life of Christ, but that it had received unfairly harsh reviews from other critics.

Critics such as Reynolds Price, writing for The New York Times, pointed to a "lack of inventiveness", based upon the fact that Mailer took so few liberties with the biblical text.

David Gelernter, writing for the National Review, cited the "sheer arrogance" of the very premise of Mailer's book. Yet he went on to agree with Miles that much of the criticism of the book had been "unfair." Gelernter called the book "strikingly orthodox" in its basic view of the character of Christ.

Mailer had largely anticipated some of the savage reviews he would receive for the book. He noted in an interview with Bruce Weber of The New York Times, "The book will get a fair share of bad reviews, but that I take for granted. I call a fair share between 65 percent and 75 percent bad reviews."

== Sales history ==
On May 11, 1997, The Gospel According to the Son entered the New York Times Best Seller list at #13. It peaked at #7 on May 25 of that year, and spent six weeks in the top 16.
