= Lee Siegel (cultural critic) =

American writer and cultural critic (born 1957)

- Born: 1957 (age 68–69); The Bronx, New York, U.S.
- Education: Columbia University
- Occupation: Writer
- Writing career
- Language: English
- Genre: Criticism
- Subjects: Culture, literature, society

Lee Siegel (born 1957) is an American writer and cultural critic who has written for multiple publications. He has authored multiple books of nonfiction and received a National Magazine Award.

== Early life and career ==
Siegel was born in The Bronx, New York. He received his BA from the Columbia University School of General Studies and his MA and MPhil from Columbia University's Graduate School of Arts and Sciences.

He worked as an editor at The New Leader and ARTnews before turning to writing full-time in 1998. Siegel has been the book critic for The Nation, art critic for Slate, television critic for and senior editor of The New Republic, staff writer for Talk magazine, staff writer for Harper's, contributing writer for the Los Angeles Times Book Review, associate editor of Raritan, senior columnist for The Daily Beast, and weekly columnist for The New York Observer. He writes a column for the New Statesman. In 2011 Siegel served as one of three judges for the PEN/John Kenneth Galbraith Award. In 2024 and 2025, he was an Open Society Foundations Ideas Workshop Fellow.

Siegel has authored multiple books of nonfiction starting in 2006.

== Reception ==
In 2002 Siegel received the National Magazine Award in the category "Reviews and Criticism". Jeff Bercovici, writing in Media Life Magazine, quoted the award citation, which called the essays "models of original thinking and passionate writing... [Siegel's] tough-minded yet generous criticism is prose of uncommon power—work that dazzles readers by drawing them into the play of ideas and the enjoyment of lively, committed debate".

In 2007 Caryn James, commenting on Not Remotely Controlled in the New York Times, said that "at their best, Siegel’s scattershot observations offer a kind of drive-by brilliance," but that he often "wildly overstates his case or ignores inconvenient evidence."

Siegel's 2008 critique of Web culture, Against the Machine: Being Human in the Age of the Electronic Mob, was called by Janet Maslin in the New York Times "rigorously sane, fair, and illuminating". Maslin noted that, with occasional lapses, it "brings dead-on accuracy to depicting the quietly insinuating ways in which the Internet can blow your mind".

In 2011, Donna Rifkind, writing in New York Times Book Review, reviewed Are You Serious? How to Be True and Get Real in the Age of Silly, calling Siegel "a tireless adversary, battling wrong-headed people and worn-out ideas" but also saying "there is little practical counsel here."

Siegel's 2017 memoir, The Draw, was praised in the New York Times Book Review by Jerald Walker as "brilliant." Walker went on to say, "An assortment of lively characters, hard-edged humor, rich psychological portraits and searing social commentary, The Draw is spellbinding, a coming-of-age tour de force."

== Controversies ==
=== Deceptive posting and suspension ===
In September 2006, Siegel was suspended from The New Republic after an internal investigation determined he was participating in misleading comments in the magazine's "Talkback" section in response to criticisms of his blog postings at The New Republic's website. The comments were made through the device of a "sock puppet" dubbed "sprezzatura", who, as one reader noted, was a consistently vigorous defender of Siegel, and who specifically denied being Siegel when challenged by another commenter in "Talkback". In response to readers who had criticized Siegel's negative comments about TV talk show host Jon Stewart, 'sprezzatura' wrote, "Siegel is brave, brilliant, and wittier than Stewart will ever be. Take that, you bunch of immature, abusive sheep". The New Republic posted an apology and shut down Siegel's blog. In an interview with the New York Times Magazine, Siegel dismissed the incident as a "prank". He resumed writing for The New Republic in early 2007.

=== Student loan default op-ed ===
In June 2015, Siegel wrote an op-ed piece for The New York Times entitled "Why I Defaulted on My Student Loans", in which he defended defaulting on the loans he received for living expenses while on full scholarship and working his way through college and graduate school at Columbia University, writing that “[t]he millions of young people today, who collectively owe over $1 trillion in loans, may want to consider my example.”

Economist Susan Dynarski wrote that Siegel is not typical of student loan defaulters both in that the typical student-loan recipient attends a public university and in that only two percent of those borrowing to fund a graduate degree default on their loans. Conservative political commentator Kevin D. Williamson, writing in National Review, called it "theft," saying that "an Ivy League degree or three is every much an item of conspicuous consumption and a status symbol as a Lamborghini." Senior Business and Economics Correspondent for Slate Jordan Weissman called it "deeply irresponsible" to suggest that students should consider defaulting on their loans and said that The New York Times should apologize for the piece. Siegel's original article was also criticized in Business Insider and MarketWatch. Siegel appeared to further discuss the article on Yahoo! Finance.

== Personal life ==
Siegel lives in Montclair, New Jersey, with his wife and two children.

== Bibliography ==
- Falling Upwards: Essays in Defense of the Imagination (Basic Books, 2006)
- Not Remotely Controlled: Notes on Television (Basic Books, 2007)
- Against the Machine: Being Human in the Age of the Electronic Mob (Spiegel&Grau/Random House, 2008)
- Are You Serious? How to Be True and Get Real in the Age of Silly (HarperCollins, 2011)
- Harvard Is Burning (Kindle Single, 2011)
- Groucho Marx: The Comedy of Existence (Yale University Press, 2016)
- The Draw: A Memoir (Farrar, Straus and Giroux, 2017)
- Why Argument Matters (Yale University Press, 2022)
