= The Executioner's Song =

1979 novel by Norman Mailer

- First edition cover
- Author: Norman Mailer
- Language: English
- Genre: True crime
- Publisher: Little, Brown and Company
- Publication date: 1979
- Publication place: United States
- Media type: Print (hardback & paperback)
- Pages: 1,056 (hardcover first edition)
- ISBN: 0316544175

The Executioner's Song (1979) is a Pulitzer Prize-winning true crime novel by American writer Norman Mailer that depicts the events related to the execution of Gary Gilmore for murder by the state of Utah. The title of the book may be a play on "The Lord High Executioner's Song" from Gilbert and Sullivan's The Mikado. "The Executioner's Song" is also the title of a poem by Mailer, published in Fuck You magazine in September 1964 and reprinted in Cannibals and Christians (1966), and the title of one of the chapters of his 1975 non-fiction book The Fight.

Notable for its portrayal of Gilmore and the anguish generated by the murders he committed, the book was central to the national debate over the revival of capital punishment by the Supreme Court in Gregg v. Georgia, 428 U.S. 153 (1976). Gilmore would be the first person to be executed in the United States since the reinstatement of the death penalty in 1976 following a moratorium of more than four years initiated by the decision in Furman v. Georgia.

== Background ==
In April 1976, Gilmore, aged 35, was released from prison after serving 13 years for armed robbery in Indiana. He was flown to Utah to live with his cousin Brenda Nicol, who agreed to be his sponsor and tried to help him find work. Gilmore soon met and became romantically involved with Nicole Baker, a 19-year-old widow with two young children who was separated from her second husband.

Despite his efforts to reform himself, Gilmore had a pattern of emotional volatility and self-destructive behavior, resulting in fighting, stealing, and using drugs. After Baker broke up with Gilmore in July, he murdered two men in two separate robberies on succeeding days. Gilmore was turned in by Brenda Nicol.

He was convicted of murder at trial in September and sentenced to death. The execution was stayed on three occasions. Gilmore became a national media sensation after he fought to have his execution performed as soon as possible. He and Baker agreed to a suicide pact that resulted in each of them suffering temporary comas in November. On January 17, 1977, after appeals filed by lawyers on behalf of the American Civil Liberties Union (in defiance of Gilmore's wishes) were rejected by the U.S. Supreme Court, Gilmore was executed by the method he chose: firing squad. He was the first person to be judicially executed in the United States since Luis Monge was executed in the Colorado gas chamber on June 2, 1967.

== Summary ==
Based almost entirely on interviews with the family and friends of both Gilmore's and his victims, the book is exhaustive in its approach. Divided into two sections, the book focuses on the events leading up to the murders, and the trial and execution of Gilmore, including full documentation of Gilmore's court appearances and his decision to demand his execution rather than to continue the appeals process.

The first section of the book deals with Gilmore's early life, his numerous detentions in juvenile crime facilities, and later, prison. It details his release some months prior to his first murder and the relationships he establishes during that time.

The second section focuses more extensively on Gilmore's trial, including his refusal to appeal his death sentence, his dealings with Lawrence Schiller, and his attorneys' continued fight on his behalf.

=== Gilmore's decision to die ===
In interviews, Mailer discussed what motivated him to invest so much time interviewing everyone involved with Gary Gilmore. On one occasion, he said that Gilmore "appealed to me because he embodied many of the themes I've been living with all my life long". In another interview, he asserted that perhaps the most important theme of the book is that "we have profound choices to make in life, and one of them may be the deep and terrible choice most of us avoid between dying now and 'saving one's soul'".

In his analysis of The Executioner's Song, critic Mark Edmundson said:

from the point where Gilmore decides that he is willing to die, he takes on a certain dignity [...] Gilmore has developed something of a romantic faith. Gilmore's effort, from about the time he enters prison, is to conduct himself so that he can die what he would himself credit as a 'good death'.

== Reception ==
The Executioner's Song won the Playboy writing award in 1979 and the Pulitzer Prize for Fiction in 1980, and was a finalist for the 1980 National Book Award.

Christopher Ricks describes the novel in the London Review of Books as "a work of genius in its range, depth, and restraint". In The New York Times, Joan Didion wrote, "no one but Mailer could have dared this book. The authentic Western voice, the voice heard in The Executioner's Song, is one heard often in life but only rarely in literature, the reason being that to truly know the West is to lack all will to write it down... This is an absolutely astonishing book."

In a review for The Times Literary Supplement, David Lodge writes that "The Executioner's Song demonstrates the undiminished power of empirical narrative to move, instruct, and delight, to provoke pity and fear, and to extend our human understanding. It is remarkable . . . for the professional skill and self-discipline with which it is composed."

Not all reviews are favourable. Charles Nicholl complained in The Daily Telegraph that Mailer perhaps overestimated the charisma of his subject, and "is often guilty of spurious[ly] overloading . . . anything that touched Gilmore". He also added that the work was in need of a "judicious edit". Alice R. Kaminsky, an English professor at the State University of New York at Cortland and mother of a son who was murdered at age 22, took Mailer to task for portraying Gilmore as a victim. In her book, The Victim’s Song (she wrote that she deliberately parodied Mailer’s title), she laid out a detailed argument excoriating Mailer and others like him for portraying Gilmore as a genius because of his writing, ignoring the gravity of his terrible deeds and their effect on people.

== Film adaptation ==
Mailer adapted a screenplay from the book for the eponymous 1982 television movie, which stars Tommy Lee Jones (who won an Emmy for the role), Eli Wallach, Pat Corley, Christine Lahti, and Rosanna Arquette, and was directed by Lawrence Schiller. The character Larry Samuels in the film represents Mailer.

In November 2026, United Artists acquired the rights to the film and plans to remake the film with Jacob Elordi starring.

== See also ==
- Creative nonfiction
- Shot in the Heart
