= Sally Kimball =

- Encyclopedia Brown character
- First appearance: Encyclopedia Brown, Boy Detective
- Last appearance: Encyclopedia Brown and the Case of the Soccer Scheme
- Created by: Donald Sobol

In-universe information
- Gender: Female
- Nationality: American

Sally Kimball is a fictional character in the Encyclopedia Brown book series by Donald Sobol. She is Encyclopedia Brown's bodyguard, sidekick, best friend, and detective agency business partner. In the 1989 HBO television series, Sally was played by Laura Bridge.

Alyssa Rosenberg suggests that both Encyclopedia and Sally are "terrific models of genre-busting characters", with Sally "effectively a ten-year-old action hero." Bonnie Morris notes that "Sally served as the brawn to Encyclopedia's brain, as his enforcer, never his secretary: an invaluable boon to girls entering middle school just as Title IX became law." Rosenberg also notes that Sally's looks "are always mentioned in the context of her physical prowess", as in "Sally was the prettiest girl in the fifth grade and the best athlete."

Olivia Rutigliano, writing for Literary Hub, ranks Sally Kimball as the second greatest detective sidekick of all time, behind Dr. John Watson.
