= Norman Mailer Society =

- Named after: Norman Mailer
- Formation: 2003
- Founders: J. Michael Lennon, Barry H. Leeds, John Whalen-Bridge, and Robert Lucid
- Founded at: New York
- Type: Literary
- Registration no.: 201724164
- Legal status: 501 (c) (3) non-profit organization
- Purpose: To stimulate and encourage interest in the works of Norman Mailer.
- Members: 300 (2017)
- President: Matthew S. Hinton
- Vice President: Nicole DePolo
- Treasurer: Robert Dean Lurie
- Secretary: Marc Triplett
- Board of directors: Neil Abercrombie, Carol Holmes Alpern, Mashey Bernstein, Robert Begiebing, Philip Bufithis, Ezra Cappell, Bonnie Culver, Nicole DePolo, J. Michael Lennon, David Light, John Buffalo Mailer, Susan Mailer, Maggie McKinley, Jason Mosser, Mark Olshaker, Lawrence Schiller, Phillip Sipiora, Enid Stubin, Barbara Wasserman, Shannon Zinck
- Website: https://normanmailersociety.org

The Norman Mailer Society is a non-profit literary society dedicated to American author Norman Mailer. The Society promotes the legacy of its eponym by holding an annual meeting of scholars and enthusiasts, publishing The Mailer Review, Project Mailer, and The NMS Podcast, awarding the Robert F. Lucid Award for the year's best scholarship, and encouraging continued interest in his work through all forms of media.

== History ==
On July 11, 2002, J. Michael Lennon, Barry H. Leeds, and John Whalen-Bridge met Norman Mailer in Provincetown, Massachusetts to discuss the creation of the organization and gain Mailer's approval. Mailer's biographer Robert Lucid could not attend, but he was one of the original quartet planning the Society. Having received Mailer's blessing, the Norman Mailer Society was officially founded in 2003. During the American Literature Association's conference in Cambridge on May 22, 2003, there was a planning meeting and interim officers elected for the Norman Mailer Society.

On November 1, 2003, the Society had its inaugural meeting in Brooklyn prompted in part as a reaction to Mailer's being dropped from the sixth edition of The Norton Anthology of American Literature because (according to the editors) "regular surveys of professors had shown declining use of Mr. Mailer's work". Ron Rosenbaum, a New York Observer columnist, commented about the creation of the Society: "It's good to recognize people for their service while they're still around to appreciate it".

Non-profit incorporation papers were filed in the State of New York, July 21, 2004, and were approved on September 14, 2004. The Society was incorporated in Windham, Connecticut in 2008.

== Activities ==
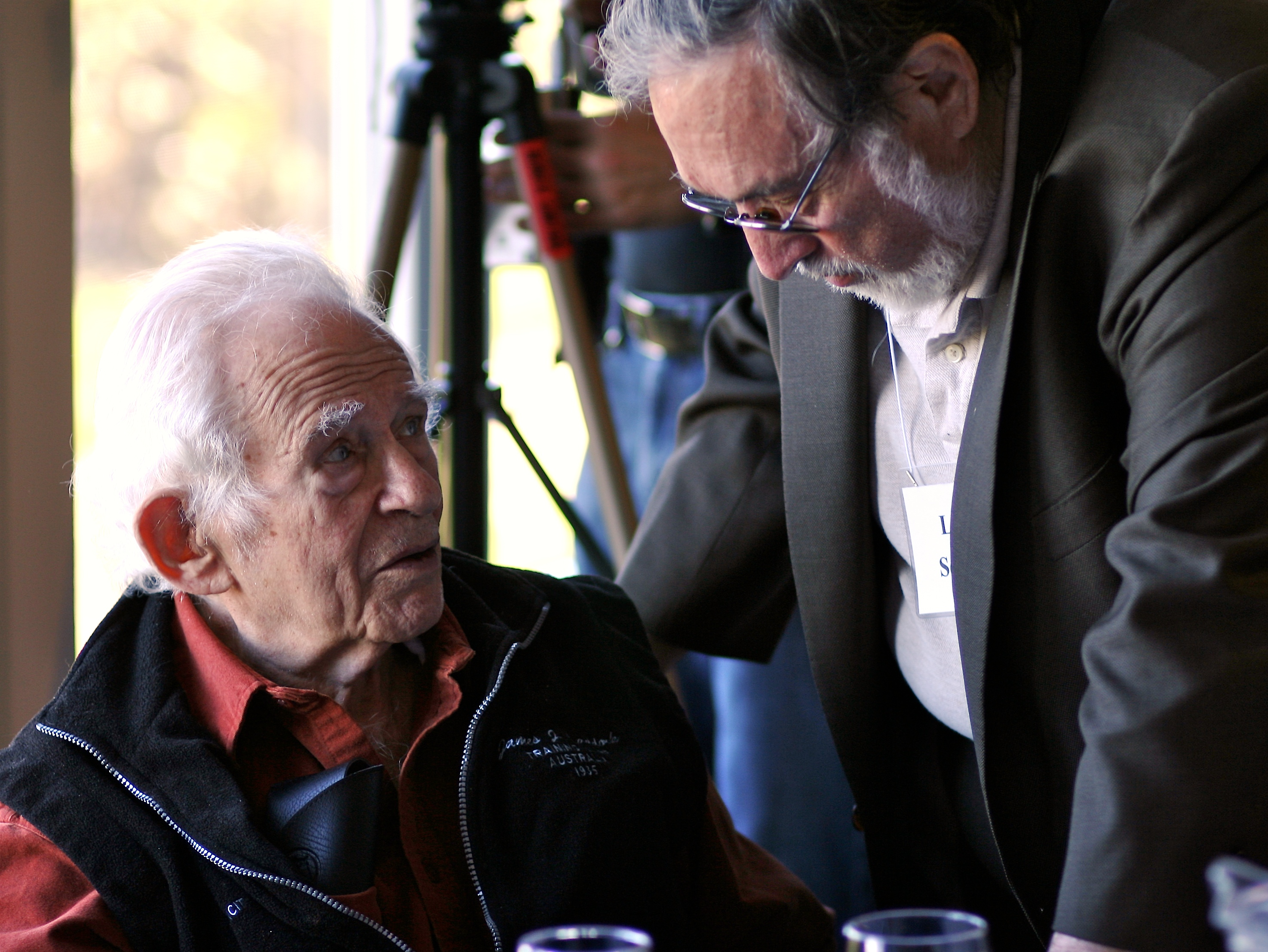
Mailer and Lawrence Schiller at the 2006 conference

Members meet annually for paper presentations, panel discussions, film viewings, and other activities centered around the life and work of Norman Mailer. In 2015, the Society reconvened in Provincetown, MA, for its annual conference, bringing together Society members, two of Mailer's daughters, and a reading of Tough Guys Don't Dance, Mailer's 1984 novel about his adopted hometown. In addition to an annual meeting, the Society undertakes the following activities: the maintaining of a website devoted to matters of interest to the membership, including a newsletter and bibliography updated semi-annually. Along with Provincetown and Brooklyn, conferences have been held in Washington (D.C.), Wilkes-Barre (PA), Long Branch (NJ), Sarasota (FL), and Macon (GA).

Norman and Norris hosted Society members at post-conference parties, in 2003 at their house in Brooklyn Heights, and 2004 through 2007 at their Provincetown, MA residence. According to Lennon, the Mailers hosted keynote speakers at their house each year for lunch, including Neil Abercrombie and William Kennedy. At the 2006 conference in Provincetown, Mailer read from his new novel, The Castle in the Forest, at the Provincetown Arts Theatre to a packed house of conference attendees and the general public.

The Society sponsored the 50th Anniversary March on the Pentagon that Mailer wrote about in his Pulitzer-Prize-winning book Armies of the Night. Organized by the Vietnam Peace Commemoration Committee, the events took place on October 24, 2017 in Washington D.C.

On May 23, 2018, the Society co-sponsored with the city of Long Branch the installation of a bronze memorial to Mailer and the Scarboro Hotel. The hotel was run and eventually owned by the Mailer family until it burned down in 1941. Members of the Society and the local community attended the unveiling ceremony where the beachside hotel used to stand.

== Publications ==
During the fourth annual conference in Provincetown (October 12–14, 2006), the membership voted to establish the brainchild of Phillip Sipiora, The Mailer Review, co-sponsored by the University of South Florida and edited by Sipiora and co-edited by Gerald Lucas. The journal is published annually in the fall.

In 2014 under the leadership of board member Gerald R. Lucas, the Society launched Project Mailer, a Digital Humanities initiative to "augment Mailer Studies for a digital age". Their first publication was an open-access, digital version of Mike Lennon's Norman Mailer: Works and Days that's "meant to be read and used on the screen".

Created and hosted by Society member Justin Bozung, The Norman Mailer Society Podcast had its premiere episode in February 2015. The Podcast is released twice monthly and features rare audio, interviews, analysis, and discussions about, as James Wolcott put it, the "wooly-bully exploits" of Norman Mailer.

In spring 2018, the Society sponsored the publication of Library of America's two-volume boxed set Norman Mailer: the Sixties edited by J. Michael Lennon. The set includes Four Books of the 1960s and Collected Essays of the 1960s.

== Robert F. Lucid Award ==
In 2003, the Society established The Robert F. Lucid Award for Mailer Studies in recognition of Lucid's long and distinguished career as a Mailer scholar. The Lucid Award is given annually based on the recommendation of a Society committee. Winners receive a plaque and a $250 honorarium, and are invited to speak at the conference.

Recent winners include Robert J. Begiebing for Norman Mailer at 100: Conversations, Correlations, Confrontations in 2023 from Louisiana State University Press; Maggie McKinley for Understanding Norman Mailer in 2018; Kevin Schultz for Buckley and Mailer: The Difficult Friendship that Shaped the Sixties in 2015; J. Michael Lennon for The Selected Letters of Norman Mailer in 2014, and again for Norman Mailer: A Double Life in 2013.

== Members ==
Society membership is open to all who share an interest in the Society's eponym. The Society consists of officers, an Executive Board, and general members from diverse backgrounds. They range from enthusiasts, academics, creatives, and politicians to family members and contemporaries of Mailer's. As of 2017, the Society has approximately 300 international members.

== See also ==
- Norman Mailer Prize
- Norman Mailer bibliography
- The Mailer Review
