= Hiram College Library =

Coordinates: 41°18′37″N 81°08′40″W

The Hiram College Library (prev. Western Reserve Eclectic Institute) is the library of Hiram College established in 1900. The construction of its predecessor, the Teachout-Cooley Library, funded by Abram Teachout, contained a collection consisting of books donated by the literary societies and the depository collection. The first of several additions made to the building was constructed in 1923.

== History ==
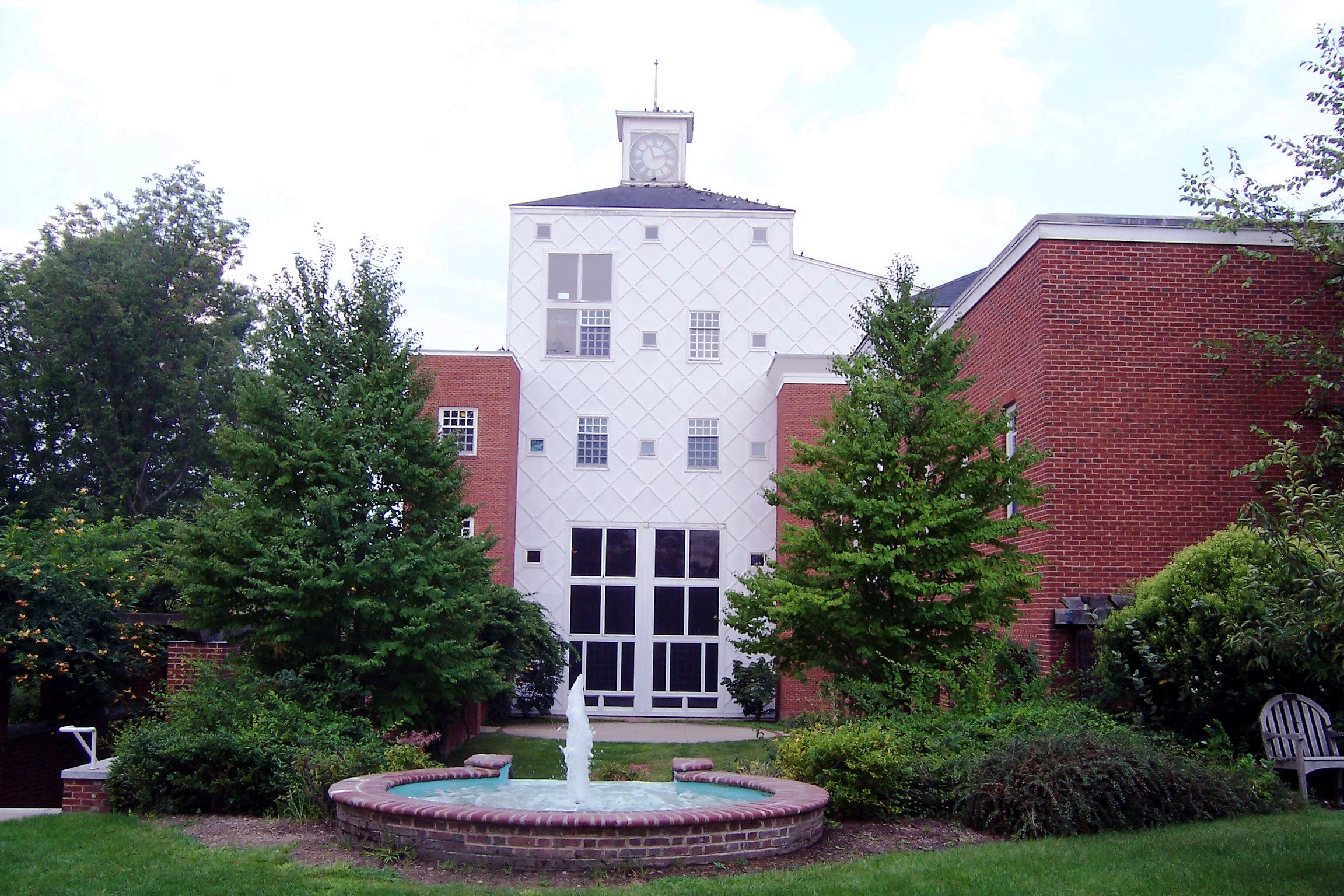
Hiram College Library

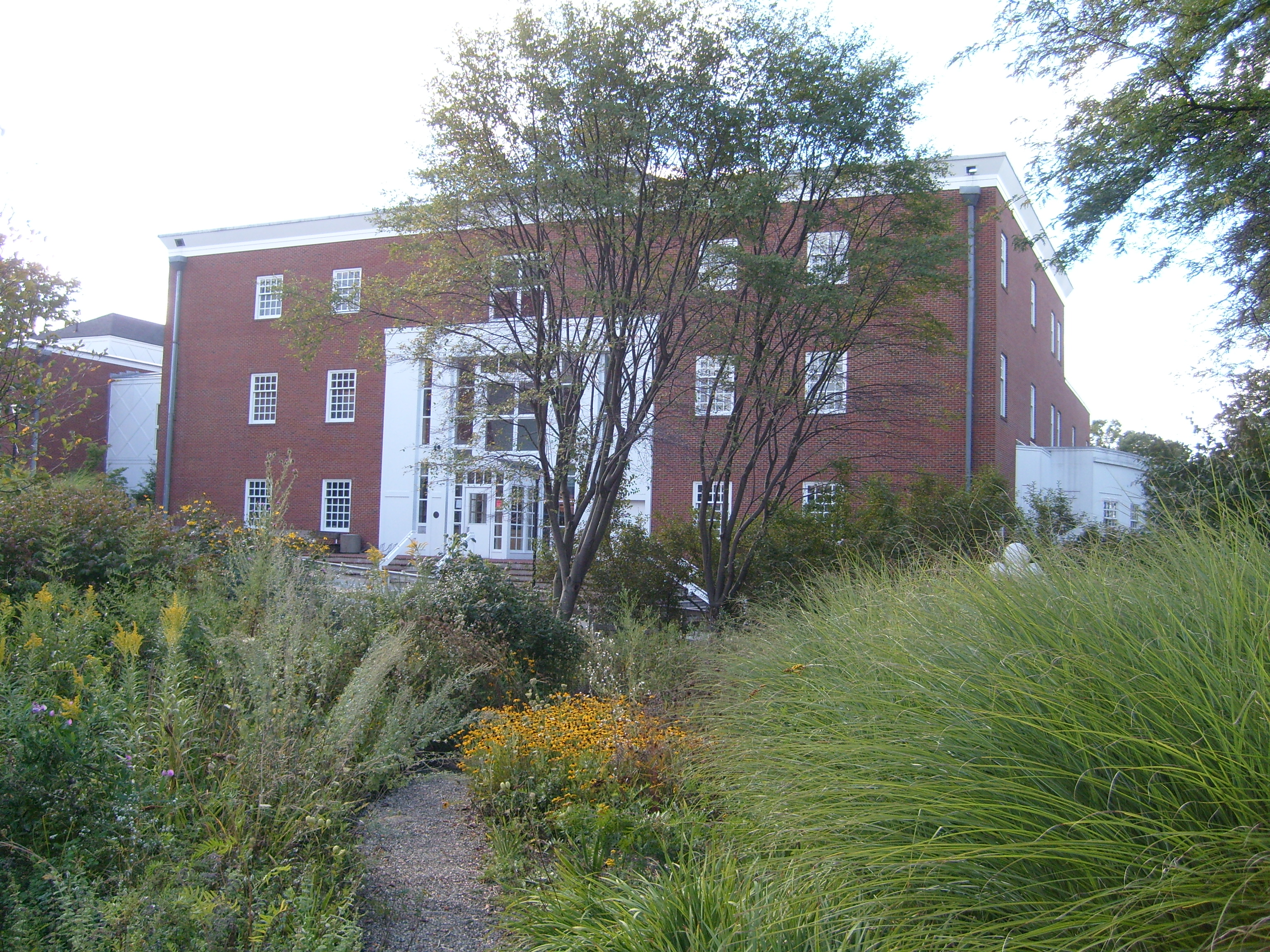
Hiram College Library

=== Prior to 1900 ===
Until November 1853, the Institution possessed no library or collection of books other than the Bible; however, in the winter of 1854–55, the Western Reserve Eclectic Institute took its first steps toward establishing a formal library. By 1858, the Delphic Library had grown modestly to include eighteen volumes, marking the beginning of a more concerted effort to provide access to literature. In the autumn of 1859, the Hesperian Society undertook its first significant initiative to create a library, working alongside the Delphic Library, which had already begun raising funds for the purchase of books. Unlike the Delphics, who sporadically used available funds for occasional acquisitions, the Hesperian Society opted for a more patient approach, choosing to accumulate a substantial fund before making any purchases. The eventual unveiling of the Hesperian Library in the designated Library room was regarded as a "noteworthy" event, celebrated not only for the sheer number of books displayed but also for the commendable quality of the collection.

Between 1854 and 1855, church members established a library in the southwest corner of the Lower Chapel, where a modest collection of seventy-five volumes was stored in a single bookcase. According to the first catalogue published by the Eclectic Institute, the trustees had considered early efforts to acquire a library, which eventually led to a total tally of 2,528 volumes across various literary societies. The introduction of a comprehensive curriculum, encompassing a broad range of subjects, significantly increased the demand for books, while the rise of extracurricular activities, particularly the formation of literary societies, became a defining characteristic of this era. Members of these societies paid dues and fees—typically around twenty-five cents each—to build up their individual libraries, sparking competition among the groups to assemble the largest and most impressive collections. In addition to these society collections, a small, private library was maintained by the President in the college’s church chapel for personal use, though it was not made accessible to the public.

Despite Hiram College boasting a book collection comparable to, if not better than, other small Ohio colleges, both students and faculty faced significant challenges. There was reportedly no central catalog or organized system for book arrangement, and restrictions were imposed on access to books owned by specific societies, with each society maintaining its own library, of which there were a minimum of five concurrently. Furthermore, only senior and graduate students were permitted to borrow books on loan, with the duration of the loan contingent upon the book's page count, capped at five weeks.

The inauguration of James A. Garfield as U.S. president in the 1880s brought widespread attention and publicity to Hiram College, leading to a significant rise in student enrollment and financial donations. This surge in funds not only supported the college's growth but also enabled the board of trustees and college president Ely Vaughn Zollars to embark on an ambitious five-year plan. A key highlight of this era was the construction of several new buildings, including the much-anticipated Teachout-Cooley Library, which opened in 1901. The library's establishment greatly enhanced the academic infrastructure of the college, providing students and faculty with an essential resource for study and research. Alongside this, other major projects, such as Miller Hall, a men’s dormitory, and Independence Hall, a residence for ministerial students, were completed, but it was the addition of the Teachout-Cooley Library that symbolized the institution’s commitment to academic excellence and marked a significant milestone in its educational mission.

The Teachout-Cooley Library of Hiram College was constructed in 1900 with funds donated by Abram Teachout, a prominent Cleveland lumber merchant. The two-story building, made of brick and wood, featured a distinctive three-story tower. In 1923, a generous contribution from the Teachout family enabled the construction of an addition to the south of the original structure, connected by a vestibule. This expansion, which included a Greek portico entrance, effectively doubled the size of the library. One of the library's most notable features was an observatory, complete with a high-quality telescope donated by Christian minister Lathrop Cooley, which remained a prominent part of the building until 1939. That year, a fire severely damaged the library, but the telescope was fortunately spared, suffering only minor smoke damage. It was later removed and relocated to a new observatory facility. Stephens Memorial Observatory, a gift from Ella M. Stephens in memory of her parents and brother, was dedicated in 1939 on Wakefield Road, where the telescope found its new home.

=== 1900 to 1950 ===
Prior to 1900, the library facilities at Hiram College consisted of small libraries corresponding with each of the student literary societies: Delphic, Hesperian, and Olive Branch. Societies' access was usually members-only, with the college's depository collection of federal government publications (established in 1874) being the only common library, which were stored in the original Hinsdale Hall.

The need for a library to be built was the result of several factors, including an increase in the number of books to about six thousand volumes, along with becoming a repository for U.S. Government documents. Another factor that also created a need for a library was the fact that the five different literary societies agreed to house their books together in one place. However, these collections would remain separated until 1928, when the literary societies were disbanded and were replaced by fraternities and sororities at Hiram. The most important factors were the financial aid received from Abram Teachout, for the express purpose of building a library; together with an observatory and telescope donated by Lathrop Cooley. To help fill up the empty shelves of the new library, an additional $1,100 was contributed for buying books.

The Library's collections then consisted of those books donated by the literary societies and the depository collection. These were consolidated by the first librarian of the college, Emma Ryder. While a student at Hiram, she was made the librarian of the Olive Branch Society, and did such an excellent job that she was asked to organize the libraries of the other societies. After she graduated in 1890, she went on to study at the University of Chicago and Syracuse University, before returning to Hiram in 1896. She served as the college's librarian until 1907, introducing the Dewey Decimal System to the Library. She also taught Greek and Latin, was the College Registrar and the House Mother for Miller Hall.

Miss Emma Ryder was appointed as the first full-time, "joint" librarian in 1895. She is attributed with shelving books pertaining to the separate literary societies together, which subsequently saw these societies lose their identity altogether. She has also been credited with establishing the Dewey Decimal system to catalogue the library's collection, along with setting up the organization of a library staff, and the beginnings of "modern" library operations for the college. Miss Ryder served until 1912, when she was replaced by Miss Jessie J. Smith.

Jessie Smith's thirty-one year tenure was dominated by The Great Depression, a devastating fire in February 1939, and World War II. The fire destroyed most of the original library and with it thousands of books, a major portion of the files and records of Professor John S. Kenyon and the furnishings of the Vachel Lindsay Reading Room. Another financial gift provided in 1923 by the Teachout family helped to rebuild the library, adding a separate fireproof building constructed to the south of the original building. Although most of the books in the original building were destroyed by the fire, library materials stored in this new building were saved. Rebuilding and replacing library materials took about two years to complete. The Cooley observatory, undamaged in the fire, was moved to another location. Despite all these disasters, administration officials, members of the board of trustees, faculty, students, alumni, and friends of Hiram maintained optimism that much better times were ahead in the future. An important part of this optimism came from the success of the adoption and implementation in 1937 of a new, innovative "Intensive Study Plan," or "Single Course Plan of Instruction", a series of educational experiments aimed at providing students with the optimum learning experience higher education would offer.

The change of the century witnessed changes in the college administration, curriculum, library operations, faculty, and students. Hiram College President Miner Lee Bates initiated a six-year growth plan that doubled student enrollment, donations, and the endowment fund. Although President Bates has been credited for making numerous significant contributions to the financial and academic health of the College, Mary Bosworth Treudley, Wellesley College Sociology Professor, believes that his appointment of Jessie J. Smith as librarian to be his most important achievement. During her thirty-one years as librarian, Miss Smith became: an innovator of new library techniques and training; an advocate for library funding from the college's budget; a leading force in the establishment of a long-term book purchasing program; and an architectural consultant for the rebuilding of the library after the fire of 1939. Miss Smith's most valuable contribution to the library and its operation, according to John H. Stein, to be the student training program she designed and instituted. This library training course consisted of one class hour and two hours of supervised work per week for one school year. Although this course was not required and students received no credit for it, Miss Smith had so many volunteers that she had to choose only the top ten best students to serve as library aids. Besides her work at Hiram, Miss Smith has been credited for founding the Portage County Library, as well as helping to reorganize libraries at Heidelberg and Denison Colleges. Miss Smith died at the age of 93 in 1964 and as a provision of her will, left a donation of her land to be used as a future site for a new library building.

A newer, more modern building was erected with a main reading room on the lower floor and a browsing room above. The card catalog was saved from fire damage and much of the lost book collection was replaced. The west end of the browsing room was designated the Vachel Lindsay Room, and the east end as the Adelaide Robbins Rhodes Room. In 1962 this area was converted into the Geidlinger Music Room.

In 1948 a further addition to the south side of the Library was built, again with funds from the Teachout Foundation. Finally, a fourth addition was necessary by 1963. This expanded the building westward toward Dean Street and effectively doubled the size of the Library once again. Included were rooms for the newly planned Archives and Special Collections. It was made possible by a substantial gift from Mr. and Mrs. Harley C. Price, and the Library was renamed the Teachout-Price Memorial Library. During the 1970s the Library came to share space with newer services, the Media Center and the Dray Computer Center, both on the lower level of the building. The Media Center became administratively incorporated into the Library.

=== 1950 to 1995 ===
Library acquisitions increased with additional books, periodicals, government documents, and numerous other "materials of communication." Demands for audio-visual materials such as movie projectors, record players, audio tape players, radios, and televisions led the library director, Ruth Whitcomb Freeman, to request additional space in the library. It is clear from library correspondence that services provided by the library were changing and expanding into new and different areas. Mrs. Freeman considered the establishment of better communication and cooperation between the library staff and faculty, along with greater student involvement, to be her main objectives. She expanded the amount of open stacks for 43 more student access; she drew up library handbooks for both students and faculty; and worked closely with student members of the Library Committee. 46 The additional space that she requested did not take place until after her retirement in 1958. Although additional space had been provided by moving the ever-growing number of periodicals to one location in the basement, along with weeding out many old unused volumes, library acquisitions continued to demand more space.

By 1960, the book collection had grown to more than 80,000 volumes; over 500 new periodical titles were added, and U.S. Government documents totaled about 50,000. The Annual Library Report, submitted by Thelma R. Bumbaugh, noted "a definite pattern of more intensive use of [library] resources," by the students, along with a "43 percent increase," in the circulation of social science books, "while history book circulation more than doubled for the same period. During this time the college, under the direction of President Paul F. Sharp, conducted a ten-year six million dollar capital expansion program for construction of new buildings. The Alumni Newsletter, From Hiram College, quoted President Sharp's statements in 1963: "Our enrollment has increased from 543 students five years ago to 835 at the present time. With an anticipated enrollment of 1,380 by 1970, one of our most pressing needs has been to expand our library facilities." In addition to money received from this campaign, the college received an anonymous gift of $350,000 which was used, along with another substantial gift by Mr. and Mrs. Harley C. Price, to construct a new three-story annex attached to the original library. As a result, the library's name was changed to "The Teachout-Price Memorial Library". This addition became the fourth, and last addition to the original library. The addition of 22,000 square feet of space more than doubled the space in the original building, and provided stack space for 60,000 new volumes. With an increase in enrollment, along with a library collection of near 13,900 volumes, as well as the addition of the Dray Computer Center housed in the library's basement, the 1963 addition to the library was becoming overcrowded.

The continued growth of the collection, the demand for more study space, and the need to incorporate new technologies led to the decision to plan for a new building by the late 1980s. Construction and opening of the new library building commenced on September 7, 1995. A comprehensive fundraising effort by the college featured the construction of a $7.1 million facility as its centerpiece. Funding came from hundreds of contributors and friends, prominently the Kresge Foundation, however no single donor contributed enough to confer a name to the building, and so it remains the Hiram College Library. Completed in 1995, the collections, equipment, and some of the furnishings of the Library were relocated in the new building that summer. Features of the new building included space for a video studio, a redesigned Archives and Special Collections, a Library Instruction Room, group study rooms, and a multi-functional space, the Pritchard Room.

Shortly thereafter, the Library provided access to its new online catalog, and two years later joined the OhioLINK Consortium. Among the more prominent changes since 1995 include:

- The movement of the music collections out of the Chamberlain Room, and its replacement by the Children's Literature and Curriculum Materials Collections.
- Wholesale movement of collections to make room for a new reading area and music recording collections.

== Library directors (tenure) ==
- Emma Ryder (1895 - 1912)
- Jessie J. Smith (1912 - 1964)
- Ruth Whitcomb Freeman (1964 -
- Dave Everett
- Janet Vogel
- Andria Morningstar-Gray (2024 - current)

== See also ==
- Hiram College
- Literary Society
- Western Reserve (disambiguation)

== Bibliography ==
- Green, Francis Marion (1901). Hiram college and Western reserve eclectic institute; fifty years of history, 1850-1900. Cleveland, Ohio: O. S. HUBBELL Printing Co. ISBN 9781171504252.
- Harbison, Philip W (1996). A History of the Hiram College Library from 1850 to 1995.
- Kenneth Irving Brown (1940). A campus decade: the Hiram study plan of intensive courses
