= Raonok Sahitya Sangstha =

Bengali literary organization

- Raonok Sahitya Sangstha
- রওনক সাহিত্য সংস্থা
- Formation: 1958; 68 years ago
- Founded at: East Pakistan
- Type: Literary organization
- Purpose: Promoting Islamic thought and values in Bengali literature, developing a Muslim literary and linguistic cultural atmosphere
- Official language: Bengali
- Key people: Mir Abul Hossain; Mohammad Mahfuzullah; Abdus Sattar; Abdul Hai Mashreki
- Publication: Nazrul Sahitya; Julekhar Mon; Brishtimukhor; Kulsum
- Formerly called: Raonok Sahitya Goshthi
- Established in 1958 or 1959 according to some sources

Raonok Sahitya Sangstha or Raonok Sahitya Goshthi was a Bengali literary organization founded in 1958, or according to some, in 1959, in East Pakistan.

The main objective of this organization was to promote Islamic thought and values in Bengali-language writings and to develop a Muslim literary and linguistic cultural atmosphere in Bengali literature by increasing the use of Arabic, Persian, and Urdu words in place of Sanskrit words.

The members of this organization named this linguistic style Pak-Bangla language, considering it as a Bengali language shaped by the religious and political culture of Pakistani Islamic atmosphere in East Pakistan, i.e., East Bengal.

== Members ==
There were a total of 21 members in it:

Members of Raonok Sahitya Sangstha (21)
- Abul Kalam Shamsuddin
- Ibrahim Khan
- Mohammad Barkatullah
- Matinuddin Ahmad
- Mujibur Rahman Khan
- Akbar Uddin
- Syed Shahadat Hossain
- Khan Mohammad Moinuddin
- M. Nasir Ali
- Maulana Mostafizur Rahman
- Azizur Rahman
- Golam Mostafa
- Benajir Ahmed
- Ashrafuzzaman Khan
- Talim Hossain
- Mohammad Mahfuzullah
- Abdur Rahman
- Abdul Mannan
- Shamsul Huda Chowdhury
- Mohammad Hossain
- ...

== Publications ==
In late 1951, Raonok Publications was established at 5 Samson Road. The following were published from there:

- Nazrul Sahitya (1960) – Edited by Mir Abul Hossain, this was a collection of writings on the literature and music of Kazi Nazrul Islam. It included works of 23 writers: Mohammad Wazed Ali, Abul Kalam Shamsuddin, Abdul Qadir, Abdul Maudood, Motaher Hossain Chowdhury, Mohammad Wazed Ali, Ajit Kumar Ghosh, Abul Fazal, Syed Ali Ashraf, Muhammad Abdul Hai, Ahmad Sharif, Ahsan Habib, Hasan Hafizur Rahman, Sirajul Islam Chowdhury, Mujibur Rahman Khan, Anisuzzaman, Abdul Gaffar Chowdhury, Atowar Rahman, Kazi Motahar Hossain, Sikandar Abu Zafar, and others. This was the first critical book on Nazrul in East Bengal.
- Julekhar Mon (poetry book) – Mohammad Mahfuzullah
- Brishtimukhor – Abdus Sattar
- Kulsum – Abdul Hai Mashreki
