= John Buffalo Mailer =

American dramatist (born 1978)

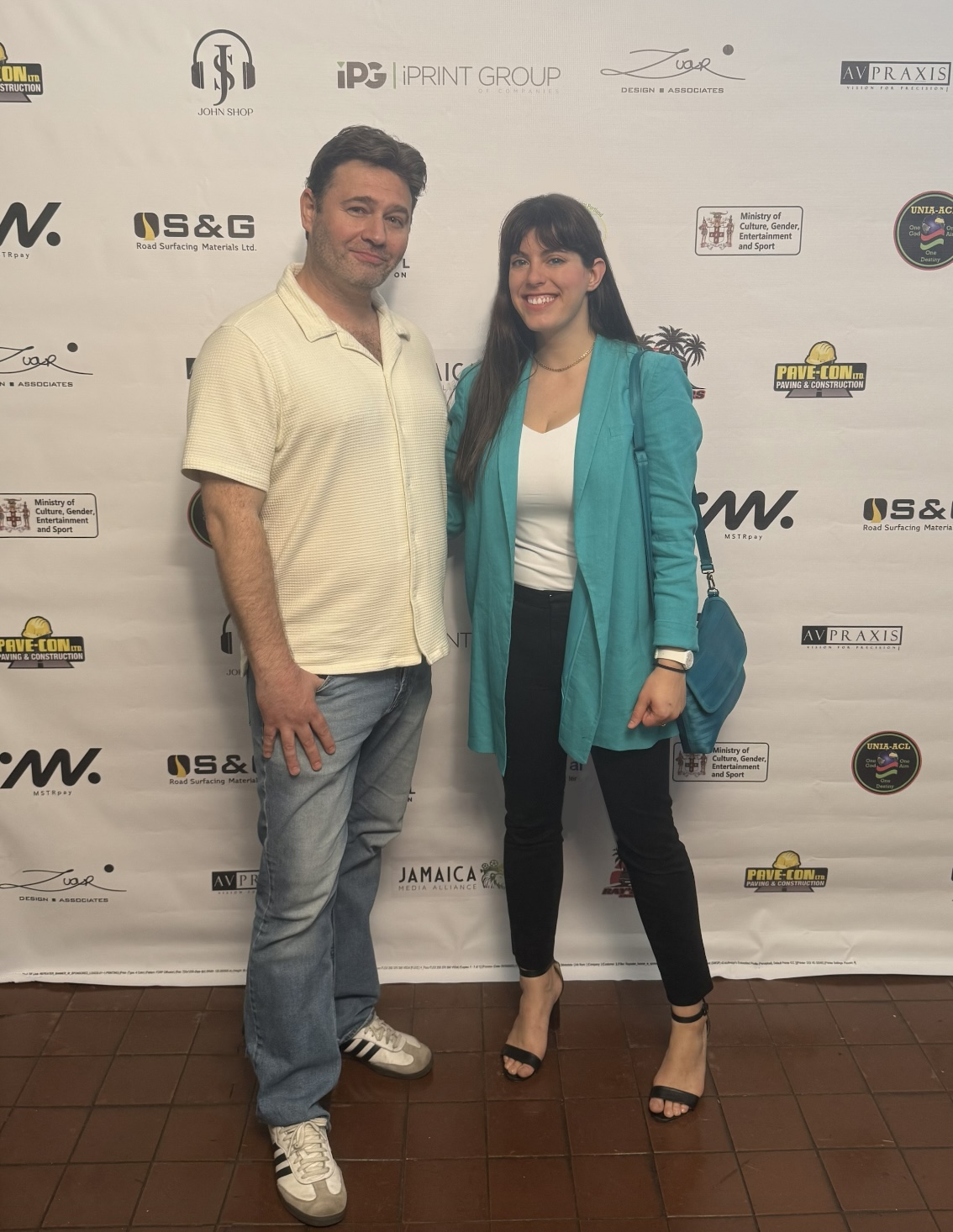
- John Buffalo Mailer and Olivia Rutigliano in 2025
- Born: April 16, 1978 (age 48); Brooklyn, New York, U.S.
- Occupations: Author, playwright, actor, film producer, journalist
- Spouse: Olivia Rutigliano
- Parent(s): Norman Mailer; Norris Church Mailer
- Relatives: Susan Mailer (half-sister); Kate Mailer (half-sister); Michael Mailer (half-brother); Stephen Mailer (half-brother)

John Buffalo Mailer (born April 16, 1978) is an American author, playwright, actor, film producer, and journalist. The youngest child of novelist Norman Mailer and author Norris Church Mailer, he has written for prominent publications, including Playboy, New York Magazine, and The American Conservative. In addition to his journalism, Mailer has authored several plays, co-founded the New York theater company Back House Productions, and acted in various films, notably Wall Street: Money Never Sleeps (2010). His works often address complex social themes, blending cultural critique with dramatic storytelling.

== Life and career ==
Mailer was born in Brooklyn, the youngest child of novelist Norman Mailer and author Norris Church Mailer. Mailer is a graduate of Wesleyan University. He has written several screenplays and is a freelance journalist. In 2006 he co-wrote The Big Empty (Nation Books, February '06) with his father.

Mailer founded Back House Productions in New York City with three other Wesleyan graduates in October 2000. The following year, Back House became the resident theater company of The Drama Bookshop's Arthur Seelan Theater, and developed, among many plays, the 2008 Tony winner for Best Musical, In The Heights. On being involved in theater, Mailer says: "I think theater will always be a powerful force because we need that human touch, particularly as we spend more and more time with machines, cell phones, computers we start to lose our humanity."

Mailer's written work can be seen on screen in the film Hello Herman (2001) directed by Michelle Danner, which opened nationwide and on-demand on June 7, 2013. Hello Herman had its New York Premiere at the Grove Street Playhouse and nine years later, its West Coast Premiere at the Edgemar Center for the Arts in Los Angeles with Mailer in the lead role. The result was Dramatists Play Services publishing the play in the Spring of 2010. Mailer's second play, Crazy Eyes, premiered in Athens, Greece in 2005.

As an actor, Mailer portrays the character Robby Mancini, an options trader and the best friend of Shia LaBeouf's character Jake Moore, in Oliver Stone's Wall Street 2: Money Never Sleeps. In a 2011, off-Broadway production of Dracula, Mailer played the role of Renfield.

Mailer served as an Executive Producer for the 2023 documentary How to Come Alive with Norman Mailer, which received positive reviews from Variety, The New York Times, and The Atlantic, among others.

In addition to a limited television series based on Norman Mailer's 1948 best-selling novel The Naked and the Dead, in 2022 Mailer was developing a scripted dramatic television series of his father's life with director James Gray and producers Rudy Langlais, Jennifer Gelfer, and Martin Tuchman.

He is a member of The Dramatists' Guild, Actor's Equity Association, SAG, and The Actors Studio, has lectured at the University of Notre Dame, Wesleyan, the University of Athens, Syracuse University, The New York Society for Ethical Culture, The Dorothy Chandler Pavilion in Los Angeles, Long Island University, and has appeared on Hannity and Combs, Air America, Democracy Now, WNYC, CSPAN's Book TV, and thebigthink.com. He has freelanced for Playboy, New York Magazine, Provincetown Arts, Lid, Stop Smiling, Corriera De La Sera, The Mailer Review, ESPN Books and The American Conservative.

== Reflections on his father ==
John Buffalo Mailer has frequently commented on the legacy of his father, Norman Mailer, and on broader questions of American democracy and culture. In 2022, he co-edited A Mysterious Country: The Grace and Fragility of American Democracy with Mailer biographer J. Michael Lennon, a collection of Norman Mailer's writings on American political life. That same year, in an interview with The Guardian, John Buffalo Mailer defended his father's reputation after reports that a major publisher had withdrawn a planned collection of Norman Mailer's essays, stating that his father "has not been cancelled" and that his work continues to be relevant and necessary. In a 2025 interview with Alex Rollins Berg, he further reflected on his father's complex legacy, describing Norman as a "fearless" writer who engaged with the most difficult moral and political issues of his time. He spoke about the challenges of being Mailer's son and the decline of bold public discourse in contemporary culture.

== Plays ==
- Hello Herman (2001)
- Crazy Eyes
- Dracula on Stage

== Filmography ==
=== As actor ===
- 1999: Black and White
- 2002: Up to the Roof
- 2006: Kettle of Fish
- 2008: W.
- 2010: Wall Street: Money Never Sleeps
- 2016: Blind
- 2019: The Second Sun
- 2020: DieRy

=== As producer ===
- 2008: The End of America
- 2002: Up to the Roof
- 2023: How to Come Alive with Norman Mailer
- TBA: Little Audrey

=== As writer ===
- 2002: Up to the Roof
- 2011: Hello, Herman Film Adaptation
- 2020: DieRy

== Editor ==
- 2022: A Mysterious Country: The Grace and Fragility of American Democracy with J. Michael Lennon

== Personal life ==
John Buffalo Mailer lives in Brooklyn, NY, with his wife Olivia Rutigliano and their daughter.
