= Susan Mailer =

American psychoanalyst and writer

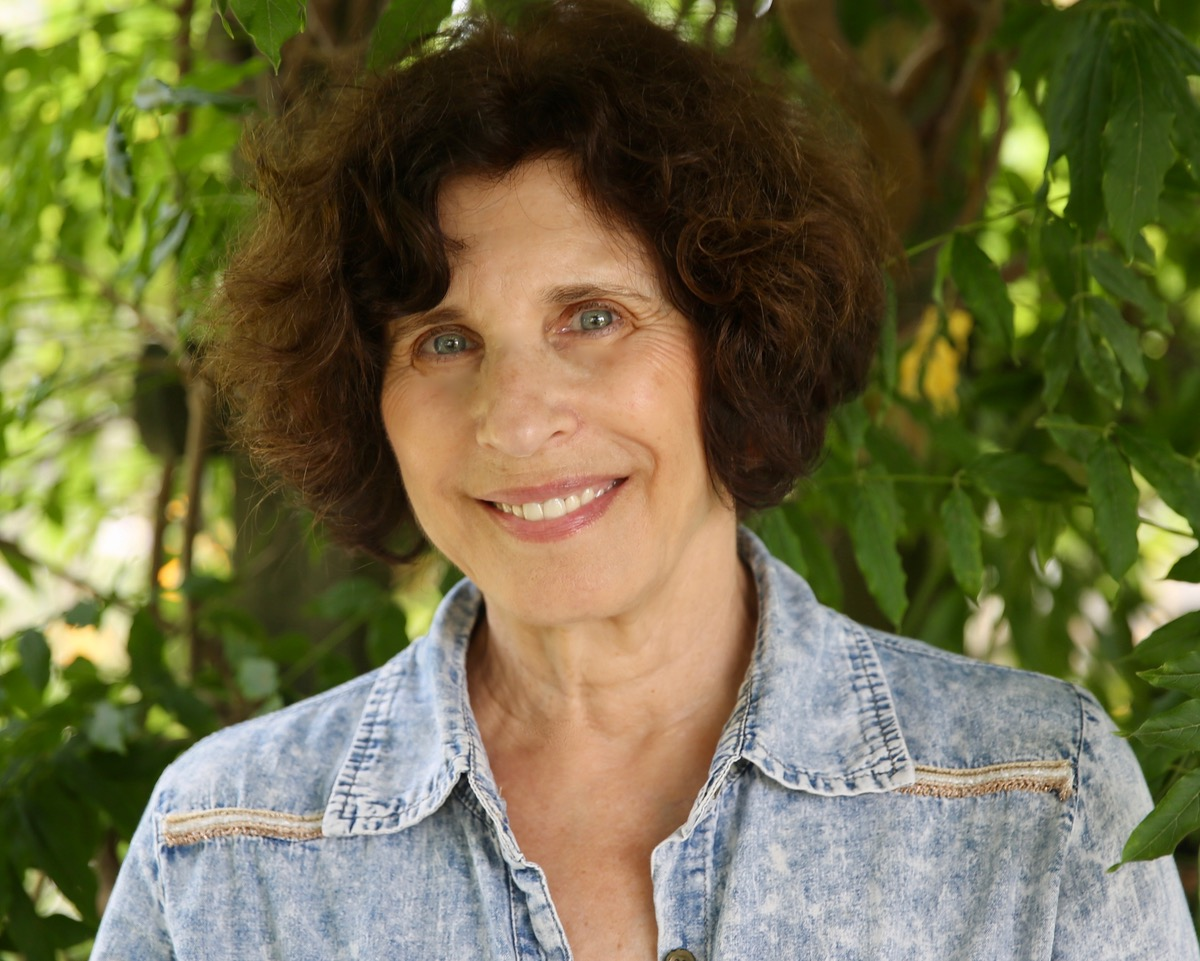
- Born: August 28, 1949 (age 77); Hollywood, California, U.S.
- Education: Barnard College
- Occupation: Psychoanalyst
- Spouse: Marco Colodro (m. 1980)
- Children: 3
- Parent: Norman Mailer (father)
- Relatives: Kate Mailer (half-sister); Michael Mailer (half-brother); Stephen Mailer (half-brother); John Buffalo Mailer (half-brother)
- Writing career
- Language: English, Spanish
- Genres: Psychoanalysis; memoir
- Notable works: In Another Place: With and Without My Father Norman Mailer
- Website: susanmailer.com

Susan Mailer (born August 28, 1949) is an American psychoanalyst, writer, and academic who has lived in Chile since the 1980s. Mailer is the firstborn child of American writer Norman Mailer and his first wife, Beatrice Silverman. She is the author of the 2019 memoir In Another Place: With and Without My Father Norman Mailer that chronicles her relationship with her famous father.

== Early life and education ==
Mailer was born in Hollywood, California, to Norman Mailer and Beatrice Silverman, both of Jewish origin. Her father was working writing screenplays in California. In 1951, her parents divorced, and her mother moved to Mexico with her future husband Salvador. Mailer lived for a time with her father's parents before moving to Mexico City to live with her mother. She spent her early years between Mexico and the U.S., becoming bilingual and bicultural which taught her "a sense of cultural colors and nuances from an early age", but made her also feel like an outsider no matter where she was physically or mentally.

Mailer attended Barnard College from 1967 to 1971. While there, she participated in the Columbia University protests of 1968 with Mark Rudd and John "J.J." Jacobs. She also attended the infamous April 30, 1971, Town Hall, "A Dialogue on Women's Liberation", wherein Norman Mailer, acting as moderator, received a "pummeling" by the panel of high-profile feminists.

Mailer completed her graduate work in Clinical Psychology in Mexico and became a psychoanalyst in 1992. Part of her decision to become a psychoanalyst stems from her early interest in narrative and the complexities of character exemplified by literary works introduced to her by her father. She ultimately finds a kinship with her father through a shared search for human understanding: she as a psychoanalyst and he as a novelist.

== In Another Place ==
Mailer's first book, In Another Place: With and Without My Father Norman Mailer, is a memoir centered around her often conflicted relationship with her famous father Norman Mailer. Inspired by a vignette she wrote in 2013, Mailer decided to write the memoir from a daughter's perspective of her father — a view that no other book about Norman Mailer has taken. It chronicles the literal and figurative distance between Susan and her father that she had to negotiate throughout her life, giving the memoir its title In Another Place.

Norman Mailer died in 2007, an event that Susan Mailer says was necessary for her to begin putting her relationship with him in perspective and to pick up the writer's pen. In the same interview, Mailer discusses that while her father was still alive, the act of writing was too intimidating, but after his passing, she discovered she enjoyed uncovering the inner tapestry of her life in writing. She says, "I never felt I could write until my father was gone".

Mailer tells Mike Lennon that "writing this memoir was a second analysis for me", and it was instrumental in helping her understand her complex emotions toward her father and her mother. Writing the memoir was a way of bridging the distance between her and Norman and, she says, "bringing him back — bringing him close to me". In Another Life grapples with complex relationships — especially one between a child and her famous father — and ultimately leads to redemption and a more complex understanding of Mailer herself and her relationship with her father.

This memoir humanizes her experiences with her father through, as critic Nicole DePolo writes, "sharp insights honed by her career as a psychoanalyst". Mailer recounts the more intense and painful moments with her father and his public life, but also depicts the more private and personal details of their relationship . According to BookTrib, even well-known incidents — like Norman's stabbing of his second wife Adele (known as "the Trouble"), his participation in the 1971 Town Hall, his disastrous support of Jack Henry Abbott's parole, and his sexual interests and infidelities — are "given new perspective and treated with greater humanity through Susan's eyes". She ultimately had to work through a largely negative view of her father who had come to sympathize with many of her father's opponents, particularly women. Bonnie Culver calls Place a "vulnerable, funny, and tough memoir that pulls no punches" and gives access to "very painful and long-buried feelings". Mailer credits her own 10-year clinical analysis for a deeper understanding about her relationship with her parents that led to the compassionate approach of her memoir.

Kirkus Reviews calls In Another Place an "affable memoir" that would be of "superficial" interest to aficionados of Norman Mailer, while DePolo avers that the memoir uses "crisp, vibrant prose that captures the essence of moments that are both remarkable and universally resonant".

== Professional life ==
While all of her other siblings went into the arts, Susan Mailer became a psychoanalyst and educator. Mailer has taught at Universidad Católica de Chile, Universidad Alberto Hurtado, and Universidad Diego Portales. Mailer has published in academic journals, both in Spanish and English, and co-founded the Psychoanalytic Association of Santiago. She is a member of various professional associations, like the International Psychoanalytic Association and the International Association for Relational Psychoanalysis and Psychotherapy. She serves on the Executive Board of the Norman Mailer Society and has published in The Mailer Review.

Mailer runs her own private psychoanalytic practice in Santiago, Chile.

== Personal life ==
Susan Mailer met her husband Marco in Mexico City in 1975. They were married in 1980 and have since lived in Santiago, Chile. She has nine siblings, three grown children, and four grandchildren.

== See also ==
- Norman Mailer
- Norman Mailer Society
- The Mailer Review

== Bibliography ==
- BookTrib (November 4, 2019). "'In Another Place' Paints Portrait of Norman Mailer as a Father". BookTrib.
- Culver, Bonnie (2018). "Patrolling No-Man's Land: Living on the Border". The Mailer Review. 12 (1): 265–65.
- DePolo, Nicole (October 19, 2019). "Review: In Another Place: With and Without my Father Norman Mailer by Susan Mailer". Hippocampus Magazine.
- Engster, Jim (host) (October 21, 2019). Kim Neustrom, Lydia Pine, Susan Mailer. Talk Louisiana. WRKF.
- Funke, Erika (host) (November 8, 2019). Susan Mailer. Art Scene. WVIA.
- Irwin, Shelley (October 21, 2019). "Susan Mailer". WGVU Public Media. Grand Rapids, MI.
- Kirkus Reviews (November 5, 2019). "Review: In Another Place With and Without My Father Norman Mailer". Kirkus.
- Lennon, J. Michael (October 1, 2019). "INTERVIEW: Susan Mailer, author of In Another Place: With and Without My Father, Norman Mailer". Hippocampus Magazine.
- — (2013). Norman Mailer: A Double Life. New York: Simon and Schuster. ISBN 978-1439150214. OCLC 873006264.
- Mailer, Susan (2019). In Another Place: With and Without My Father Norman Mailer. Northampton House Press. ISBN 978-1937997977.
- Myers, Marc (January 7, 2020). "Susan Mailer Remembers Road Trips and Bullfights With Her Famous Father". The Wall Street Journal.
- Milam, Stan (host) (October 25, 2019). Susan Mailer Author of In Another Place and Daughter of Norman. Stan Milam Show. WCLO.
- Odell, Michael (January 29, 2020). "'I felt liberated by my father's death'". The Times. London. pp. 2–3.
