= The Second Sun =

- Directed by: Jennifer Gelfer
- Written by: James Patrick Nelson
- Starring: Eden Epstein; John Buffalo Mailer; Ciaran Byrne
- Release date: August 16, 2019
- Running time: 77 minutes
- Country: United States
- Language: English

The Second Sun is a 2019 American drama film written by James Patrick Nelson, directed by Jennifer Gelfer and starring Eden Epstein, John Buffalo Mailer and Ciaran Byrne.

== Cast ==
- Eden Epstein as Joy
- John Buffalo Mailer as Max
- Ciaran Byrne as Joe

== Release ==
The film was released on VOD on August 16, 2019.

== Reception ==
The film has a 0% rating on Rotten Tomatoes based on five reviews.

Gary Goldstein of the Los Angeles Times gave the film a negative review and wrote, "Save Mailer’s pushy “New Yawk” accent, the leads do what they can with their unconvincing characters and the rusty plot, but it’s a hopeless effort. Nice opening title sequence though."

Alex Saveliev of Film Threat rated the film a five out of ten and wrote, "Perhaps The Second Sun would have functioned better on stage. There’s a shred of melancholy permeating the otherwise-glossy narrative that may be more palpable when experienced live, without the celluloid barrier."
