= Encyclopedia Brown =

Children's book series by Donald J. Sobol

Cover of the first edition of Encyclopedia Brown: Boy Detective (1963)

Encyclopedia Brown is a series of children's books featuring the adventures of boy detective Leroy Brown, nicknamed "Encyclopedia" for his intelligence and range of knowledge. The 29 books in the children's literature series were written (one co-written) by Donald J. Sobol, with the first book published in 1963 and the last published posthumously in 2012. In addition to the main books, the Encyclopedia Brown series has spawned a comic strip, a TV series, and compilation books of puzzles and games.

Sobol's first Encyclopedia Brown book was written in two weeks; subsequent books took about six months to write. Its main publisher was Bantam Skylark.

== Style ==
Each book in the Encyclopedia Brown mystery series is self-contained in that the reader is not required to have read earlier books in order to understand the stories. The major characters, settings, etc. are usually introduced (or reintroduced) in each book.

Books featuring Brown are subdivided into a number—usually ten or more—of (possibly interlinked) short stories, each of which presents a mystery. The mysteries are intended to be solved by the reader, thanks to the placement of a logical or factual inconsistency somewhere within the text. This is very similar to the layout of Donald Sobol's other book series, Two-Minute Mysteries. Many of the mysteries involve Brown helping his father, the local police chief, solve a crime; Brown outwitting town bully Bugs Meany, the leader of a gang known as the Tigers; or Brown being aided by Sally Kimball, his partner, close friend, and bodyguard. Brown, his father, or Sally invariably solves the case by exposing the inconsistency, detailed in the "Answers" section in the back of the book.

== Formula ==
The books often follow a formula where the first chapter involves Brown solving a case at the dinner table for his father, the local police chief in the fictional seaside town of Idaville in an unspecified state. When Chief Brown barely tastes his meal, that is a clue he was handed a difficult case. He pulls out his casebook and goes over it with the family. Encyclopedia solves these cases by briefly closing his eyes while he thinks deeply, then asking a single question which directly leads to his finding the solution.

The second mystery often begins in the Brown garage on Rover Avenue, where Encyclopedia has set up a detective agency to help neighborhood children solve cases for "25 cents per day, plus expenses—No case too small." This second case usually involves the town bully and mischief maker Bugs Meany, leader of a gang called the Tigers, who, after being foiled, will attempt revenge in the third mystery.

In the third mystery, the plot involves Encyclopedia's partner, close friend, and bodyguard, Sally Kimball, the one person under 14 years of age to physically stand up to Bugs. She is the only reason that Bugs and his Tigers do not try to physically attack Encyclopedia. Encyclopedia tends to dislike anyone whom Sally has a crush on, possibly indicating that he has a crush on her. Also intelligent, Sally once attempted—in the series' first book—to prove herself smarter than Encyclopedia by stumping him with a mystery of her own creation when they first met. Ironically, the contest was held at the Tigers' clubhouse, with Bugs and the others cheering him on. However, she was beaten in the contest (although Encyclopedia admitted that she almost tricked him), after which she became his friend. In subsequent storylines Bugs or his gang usually set up some sort of trap to get Encyclopedia or Sally in trouble. However, as in the previous story, they make a key mistake which Encyclopedia exposes.

Later cases may find Encyclopedia assisting his father at a crime scene (rarely more serious than larceny, and Encyclopedia is always discreet when helping his father) or interacting with people around town, often exposing scams. One such example is a high school dropout and would-be con artist named Wilford Wiggins who spends time trying to dream up schemes to fleece kids out of their money. Like Bugs, his schemes have an inconsistency which Encyclopedia exposes.

In some cases it is Sally and not Encyclopedia who figures it out because, as she tells Encyclopedia, "You are a boy." In other words, she notices things that only a girl would find inconsistent. Sally can sometimes deduce who committed the crime, or whether a certain person is lying, but cannot always prove it.

== Legacy ==
The Encyclopedia Brown books have experienced some enduring popularity. They have also inspired other mystery series, such as Seymour Simon's Einstein Anderson mystery series published in the 1980s.

In 1976, the Mystery Writers of America honored Sobol and his Encyclopedia Brown series with a special Edgar Award.

Educators have used Encyclopedia Brown in classrooms to instruct students in skills such as writing reports. In 1986, the Society for Visual Education, Inc. published a filmstrip series with accompanying audio cassette tapes and workbooks for elementary and middle schools' use. Four Encyclopedia Brown stories were utilized: "The Case of the Missing Statue", "The Case of the Happy Nephew", "The Case of the Kidnapped Pigs", and "The Case of the Marble Shooter". According to WorldCat's library catalog listing, "As super-sleuth Encyclopedia Brown solves four mysteries, he shows students how he fills out his reports, including selecting a topic, gathering information, taking notes, making an outline, and revising and editing."

== Adaptations ==
=== Comic strip ===

From December 3, 1978, to September 20, 1980, Encyclopedia Brown was a daily and Sunday comic strip syndicated by Universal Press Syndicate. The artwork was done by Frank Bolle, and Donald J. Sobol was credited as the writer. When the strips were collected into books in the mid-1980s, the strip was credited to Elliot Caplin, based on Sobol's characters. The strips adapted Sobol stories, both ones that had originally been Encyclopedia Brown tales and ones that had been part of Sobol's syndicated Two-Minute Mysteries features.

=== Television series ===
A live action television series adaptation, also called Encyclopedia Brown, ran on HBO starting in 1989. Scott Bremner played the title role with Laura Bridge playing Sally. The series ran for eight episodes. It was produced by Howard David Deutsch and directed by Savage Steve Holland. Parts of the series were filmed in Provo, Utah.

The series began with an hour-long special, "The Case of the Missing Time Capsule", and subsequent six episodes were 30 minutes long.

1. "The Case of the Missing Time Capsule" (hour long special first aired on March 2, 1989, to kick off series and aired over 200 times on HBO) "Idaville is celebrating its 100th birthday by opening a time capsule left by the town founder. But before anyone can discover what riches it contains, the capsule is stolen! When E.B. and his friend Sally investigate, they find no shortage of suspects.
2. "The Case of the Missing U.F.O." (Case #529) aired first on 9 March 1990. Something eerie is going on in Idaville when a flying saucer and flashing lights appear in the night sky. Encyclopedia Brown and his side-kick Sally interrupt their relaxing camping getaway to brave the unknown and uncover the mystery of the U.F.O.
3. "The Case of the Amazing Race Car" (case #524) first aired 16 March 1990. Davey looks like a sure winner in a funny car derby, that is, until someone steals his car. Encyclopedia Brown steps in to solve the mystery.
4. "The Case of the Ghostly Rider" (case #525) aired 23 March 1990. The ghost of the WildCat Kid has returned to haunt Old Glennville, can EB and Sally with a little help from Bugs Meany save the day?
5. "The Case of the Flaming Beauty Queen" (case #932) first aired 5 June 1990. Encyclopedia Brown investigates who set the fires in the library and whether the case of the hidden money is a scam or not.
6. "The Case of the Incredible Culpepper" first aired 10 July 1990. This episode does not seem to have been released to VHS. The big Idaville magic show is spoiled when a mountain lion belonging to The Incredible Culpepper is stolen. E.B. and Sally are immediately on the case and identify several suspects. With their typical detective skills they soon solve the crime and return the lion to Culpepper. The magic show finally entertains all the good folks of the town- Thanks to Encyclopedia Brown.)
7. "The Case of the Burglared Baseball Cards" (case #523) first aired 1 September 1990. Encyclopedia looks into the late night theft of a priceless collection of baseball cards.
8. "Encyclopedia Brown, The Boy Detective in One Minute Mysteries," released straight to video (This includes 5 of the Encyclopedia Brown stories from the books, "The Case of the Scattered Cards", "The Case of the Foot Warmer", "The Case of the Bitter Drink", “The Case of the Civil War Sword", and "The Case of the Great Merko".)

Many of these episodes were later released on VHS.

=== Film ===
In June 2013, Warner Bros. optioned the Encyclopedia Brown books into a feature film. Matt Johnson was in talks to write the movie. Roy Lee and Howard David Deutsch (producer of the 1989 Encyclopedia Brown TV series) and Jonathan Zakin were announced as producing.

== Books ==
The Encyclopedia Brown books, in order of publication (parentheses indicate numbers on original release cover art):

1. Encyclopedia Brown, Boy Detective (1963, illustrated by Leonard Shortall ISBN 0-525-67200-1, 1982 reissue ISBN 0-553-15724-8)
2. Encyclopedia Brown and the Case of the Secret Pitch (1965, illustrated by Leonard Shortall ISBN 0-525-67202-8, reissued in 1976 as Encyclopedia Brown Strikes Again, ISBN 0-590-01650-4)
3. Encyclopedia Brown Finds the Clues (1966, illustrated by Leonard Shortall ISBN 0-525-67204-4)
4. Encyclopedia Brown Gets His Man (1967, illustrated by Leonard Shortall ISBN 0-525-67206-0)
5. Encyclopedia Brown Solves Them All (1968, illustrated by Leonard Shortall ISBN 0-525-67212-5)
6. Encyclopedia Brown Keeps the Peace (1969, illustrated by Leonard Shortall ISBN 0-525-67208-7)
7. Encyclopedia Brown Saves the Day (1970, illustrated by Leonard Shortall ISBN 0-525-67210-9)
8. Encyclopedia Brown Tracks Them Down (1971, illustrated by Leonard Shortall ISBN 0-553-15721-3)
9. Encyclopedia Brown Shows the Way (1972, illustrated by Leonard Shortall ISBN 0-553-15737-X)
10. Encyclopedia Brown Takes the Case (1973, illustrated by Leonard Shortall ISBN 0-553-15723-X)
11. Encyclopedia Brown Lends a Hand (1974, illustrated by Leonard Shortall ISBN 0-553-48133-9, reissued as Encyclopedia Brown and the Case of the Exploding Plumbing and Other Mysteries, ISBN 0-590-44093-4)
12. Encyclopedia Brown and the Case of the Dead Eagles (1975, illustrated by Leonard Shortall ISBN 0-590-43343-1)
13. Encyclopedia Brown and the Case of the Midnight Visitor (1977, ISBN 0-553-15586-5)
14. Encyclopedia Brown Carries On (1980, illustrated by Ib Ohlsson ISBN 0-02-786190-2)
15. Encyclopedia Brown Sets the Pace (1981, illustrated by Ib Ohlsson ISBN 0-02-786200-3)
16. (15 1/2) Encyclopedia Brown Takes the Cake (1982, ISBN 0-590-07843-7) (Co-written with Glenn Andrews)
17. (16) Encyclopedia Brown and the Case of the Mysterious Handprints (1985, illustrated by Gail Owens ISBN 0-553-15739-6)
18. (17) Encyclopedia Brown and the Case of the Treasure Hunt (1988, illustrated by Gail Owens ISBN 0-553-15650-0)
19. (18) Encyclopedia Brown and the Case of the Disgusting Sneakers (1990, illustrated by Gail Owens ISBN 0-688-09012-5)
20. (19) Encyclopedia Brown and the Case of the Two Spies (1995, ISBN 0-385-32036-1)
21. (20) Encyclopedia Brown and the Case of Pablo's Nose (1996, ISBN 0-385-32184-8)
22. (21) Encyclopedia Brown and the Case of the Sleeping Dog (1998, ISBN 0-385-32576-2)
23. (22) Encyclopedia Brown and the Case of the Slippery Salamander (2000, ISBN 0-385-32579-7)
24. (23) Encyclopedia Brown and the Case of the Jumping Frogs (2003, ISBN 0-385-72931-6)
25. (24) Encyclopedia Brown Cracks the Case (2007, ISBN 978-0-525-47924-6)
26. (25) Encyclopedia Brown, Super Sleuth (2009, ISBN 978-0-525-42100-9)
27. (26) Encyclopedia Brown and the Case of the Secret UFOs (2010, ISBN 978-0-525-42210-5)
28. (27) Encyclopedia Brown and the Case of the Carnival Crime (2011, ISBN 978-0-525-42211-2)
29. (28) Encyclopedia Brown and the Case of the Soccer Scheme (2012, ISBN 978-0-525-42582-3)
30. (29) Encyclopedia Brown and the Case of the Marshmallow Tower (2025, written by Eric Sobol, son of creator Donald J. Sobol, illustrated by John Joseph ISBN 978-0-593-69077-2)

=== Related works ===
- Encyclopedia Brown's Record Book of Weird and Wonderful Facts (1979, ISBN 0-440-02329-7)
- Encyclopedia Brown's First Book of Puzzles and Games (1980, ISBN 0-553-15300-5) (Note: Jim Razzi is listed as the author, with an acknowledgement of being based upon the Encyclopedia Brown series created by Donald J. Sobol.)
- Encyclopedia Brown's Second Book of Puzzles and Games (1980, ISBN 0-553-15099-5) (Note: Jim Razzi is listed as the author, with an acknowledgement of being based upon the Encyclopedia Brown series created by Donald J. Sobol.)
- Encyclopedia Brown's Third Book of Puzzles and Games (1981, ISBN 0-553-15077-4) (Note: Jim Razzi is listed as the author, with an acknowledgement of being based upon the Encyclopedia Brown series created by Donald J. Sobol.)
- Encyclopedia Brown's Fourth Book of Puzzles and Games (1981, ISBN 0-553-15110-X) (Note: Jim Razzi is listed as the author, with an acknowledgement of being based upon the Encyclopedia Brown series created by Donald J. Sobol.)
- Encyclopedia Brown's Second Record Book of Weird and Wonderful Facts (1981, ISBN 0-440-02260-6)
- Encyclopedia Brown's Book of Wacky Crimes (1983 ISBN 0-553-15160-6)
- Encyclopedia Brown's Book of Wacky Spies (1984 ISBN 0-553-15257-2)
- Encyclopedia Brown's Book of Wacky Sports (1984 ISBN 0-553-15269-6)
- Encyclopedia Brown's Book of Wacky Animals (1985, ISBN 0-553-15346-3)
- Encyclopedia Brown's Third Record Book of Weird and Wonderful Facts (1985, ISBN 0-688-05705-5)
- Encyclopedia Brown's Book of Comic Strips #1 (1985, ISBN 0-553-15228-9) (Note: This is a compilation of the "Encyclopedia Brown" newspaper comic strips. Elliot Caplin is listed as the author. Most of the comics are based on the Donald J. Sobol stories, but there are some original stories too.)
- Encyclopedia Brown's Book of Comic Strips #2 (1985, ISBN 0-553-15217-3) (Note: This is a compilation of the "Encyclopedia Brown" newspaper comic strips. Elliot Caplin is listed as the author. Most of the comics are based on the Donald J. Sobol stories, but there are some original stories too.)
- Encyclopedia Brown's Book of Wacky Cars (1987, ISBN 0-688-06222-9)
- Encyclopedia Brown's Book of Wacky Outdoors (1988 ISBN 0-553-15598-9)
- Encyclopedia Brown's Book of Strange But True Crimes (1992, ISBN 0-590-44148-5)
- Encyclopedia Brown and his Best Cases Ever (2013, ISBN 978-0147508713) (Note: This book is a commemorative book released in celebration of Encyclopedia Brown's 50th anniversary. The book contains a letter from Donald J. Sobol detailing the history of the book series and its creation, as well as 15 cases selected from the previously published books.)
- The Book of Puzzles and Games books (four books in all) were sometimes included in Encyclopedia Brown box sets with the original Encyclopedia Brown mystery books by Sobol.
- Encyclopedia Brown books have also been released in ebook format, as well as on compact disc and audio cassette tape.

== Solve-It-Yourself Mystery Sweepstakes ==
From January 15 to June 30, 1989, a special Solve-It-Yourself Mystery Sweepstakes was held in conjunction with the Encyclopedia Brown books and Bantam Books. In the back of specially marked copies of Encyclopedia Brown and the Case of the Treasure Hunt, Sobol presented an unsolved mystery for the contestant to solve and submit an answer for a chance to win a prize. The mystery for the contest was called "The Case of the Missing Birthday Gift", wherein Encyclopedia must solve the case of a stolen bicycle given as a birthday gift to Willie Grant on his tenth birthday. The Tigers make an appearance as the suspects in the case; Bugs Meany, Jack Beck, and Rocky Graham all show up at the Tigers' clubhouse.

Contestants were allowed to enter as many times as they wished if they used a separate envelope for each entry. The sweepstakes was only available to US and Canada residents. No purchase was necessary, as one could either use the official form in the back of specially marked copies of Encyclopedia Brown and the Case of the Treasure Hunt or submit a 3" by 5" index card with the solution and the contestant's contact information.

== Parodies and tributes ==
The satirical newspaper The Onion ran an article in 2003 titled "Idaville Detective 'Encyclopedia' Brown Found Dead In Library Dumpster", which stated that Encyclopedia Brown, now a middle-aged police detective, had been murdered. The article parodied the books' tendency to have crimes solved through knowledge of trivia, and ended with Bugs Meany, who was now police commissioner, stating that he had an alibi for the murder in that "I was at the North Pole watching the penguins." This is a reference to The Case of the Explorer's Money, where Encyclopedia Brown solves a case by noting that penguins and polar bears live on opposite hemispheres.

Ed Brubaker and Sean Phillips' Criminal: Last of the Innocent graphic novel features a reference to Encyclopedia Brown, with a grown-up analogue of Encyclopedia featured in the comic, as confirmed by Ed Brubaker himself.

The comic strip FoxTrot ran a 2000 storyline where Jason and Marcus try their hand at being private investigators, out to solve a theft perpetrated on their girlfriends. One agency name they tried was "Encyclopedias Brown And White" (because Marcus is African-American and Jason is Caucasian), which became the title of FoxTrot's next book of comics.

The protagonist of the 2020 comedic noir film The Kid Detective is a former child prodigy detective, now an unsuccessful adult, living in a small town.

In The Simpsons episode "500 Keys", the grave of Encyclopedia Brown is shown briefly next to those of Nancy Drew and the Hardy Boys, to which Lisa comments "Jeez, they're dropping like flies".

In the Futurama episode "The Futurama Mystery Liberry", the character is parodied as Wikipedia Brown.
