= Hey, I'm Alive =

1975 television film

- Genre: Adventure; Drama
- Based on: Hey, I'm Alive by Helen Klaben & Beth Day
- Written by: Rita Lakin
- Directed by: Lawrence Schiller
- Starring: Edward Asner; Sally Struthers
- Theme music composer: Frank De Vol
- Country of origin: United States
- Original language: English

Production
- Executive producer: Charles W. Fries
- Producer: Lawrence Schiller
- Production location: Vancouver
- Cinematography: Richard Moore
- Editor: Millie Moore
- Running time: 75 min.
- Production companies: Charles Fries Productions; Worldvision Enterprises

Original release
- Network: ABC
- Release: November 7, 1975

Hey, I'm Alive is a 1975 American made-for-television adventure drama film starring Edward Asner and Sally Struthers. It recounts the true story of Helen Klaben and Ralph Flores as described in Klaben's book of the same name.

The director, Lawrence Schiller, photographed the rescue in 1963 for Life magazine. It premiered on ABC on November 7, 1975.

Klaben appeared as herself on the March 2, 1964 episode of the CBS television game show To Tell the Truth, receiving one of four votes.

== Plot ==
Two plane crash survivors spend 49 days of winter in the Yukon before they are rescued.

== Cast ==
Actor	Role
Ed Asner	Ralph Flores
Sally Struthers	Helen Klaben
Milton Selzer	Glen Sanders
Hagan Beggs	Jeff Lawson
Claudine Melgrave	Mrs. Flores
Maria Hernandez	Sheryl Flores
Lloyd Berry	Johnson
Steven Bradden	Lou Turner
