= Western Reserve (disambiguation) =

Western Reserve may refer to:

- The Connecticut Western Reserve, now northeastern Ohio, U.S.
- Western Reserve Academy, Hudson, Ohio, founded 1826
- Western Reserve Eclectic Institute, now Hiram College, Hiram, Ohio, founded 1850
- Western Reserve Historical Society
- Western Reserve High School (Berlin Center, Ohio)
- Western Reserve High School (Collins, Ohio)
- Western Reserve Public Media and Western Reserve PBS, branding of public television stations WEAO-TV and WNEO-TV
- Western Reserve Land Conservancy, a nonprofit land trust in Northeast Ohio
- Case Western Reserve University, Cleveland, Ohio. Founded in 1826 as Western Reserve College and later named Western Reserve University; merged with Case Institute of Technology in 1967
- SS Western Reserve, a steel-plate freighter that sank in Lake Superior in 1892
- Western Reserve Hospital, a local hospital in Cuyahoga Falls, Ohio, founded 1943.
- The Manitoba West Reserve or Western Reserve in South Central Manitoba, Canada, immediately north of the American border, that was settled by Russian Mennonites beginning in 1875
- Western Reserve Transit Authority, serving Mahoning County, Ohio
