= Literary society =

Association fostering literary culture

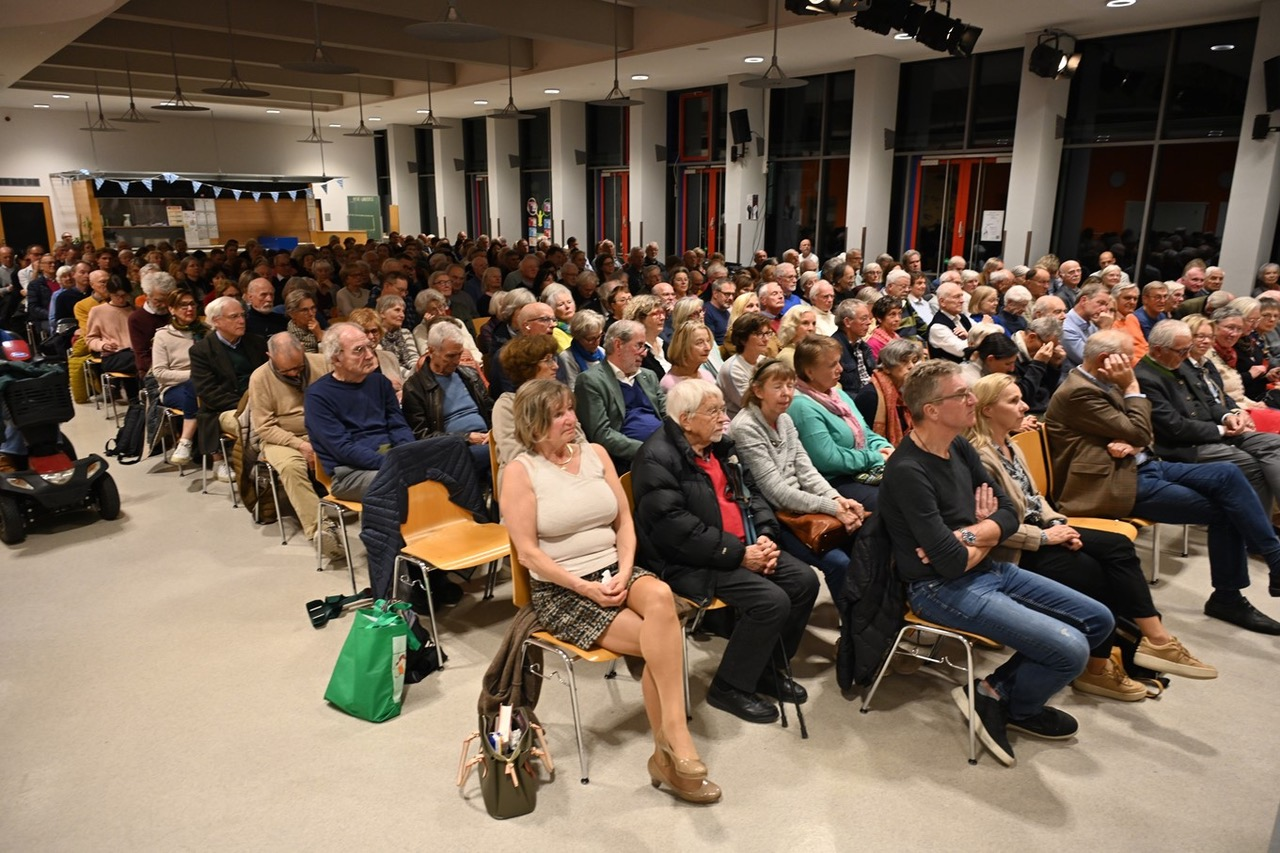
Literary society anniversary celebration

A literary society is a group of people interested in literature. In the modern sense, this refers to an organization which promotes the reception of a genre of writing or a specific author.

== Working fields ==
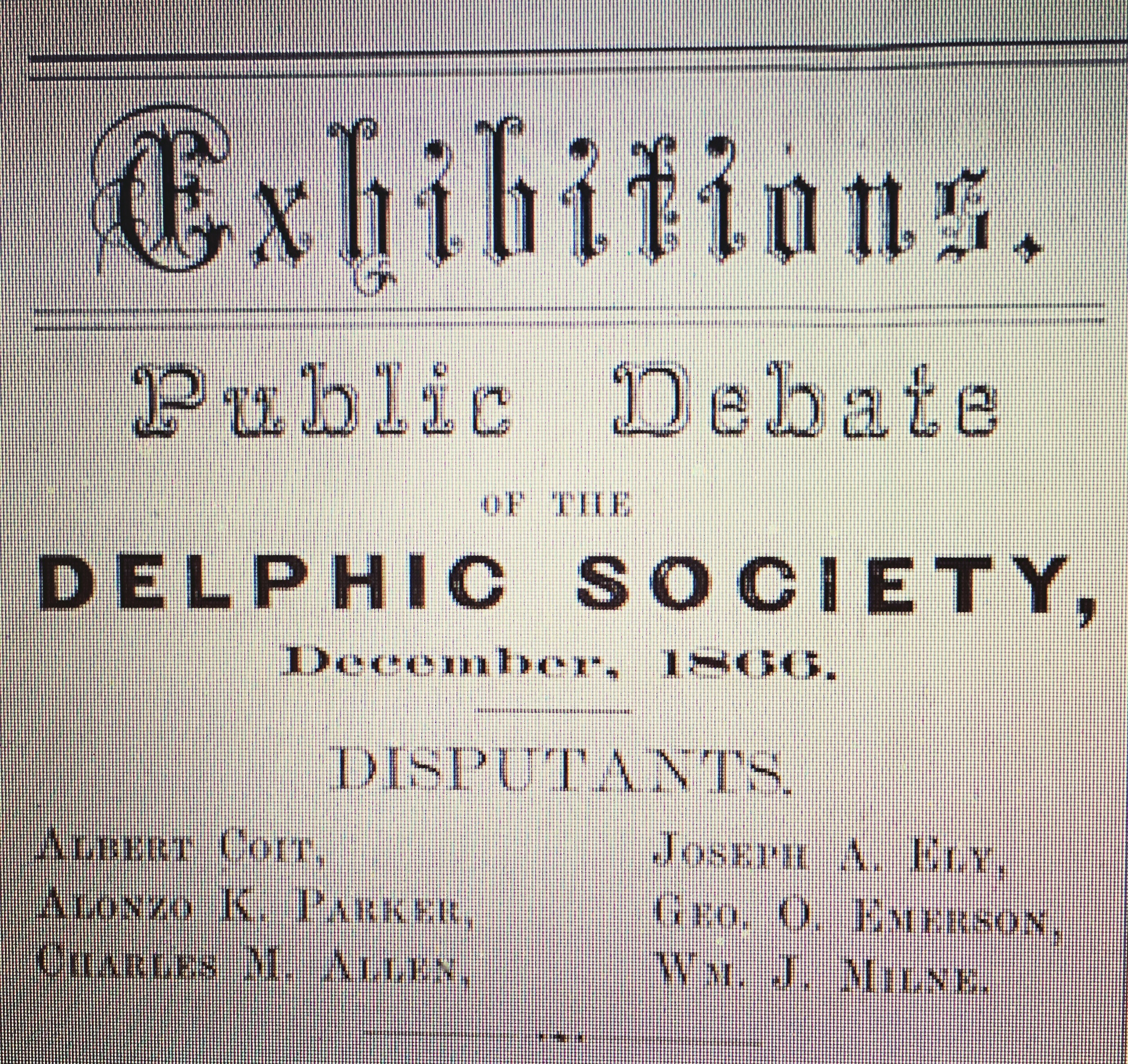
Public debate invite

Modern literary societies typically promote research, publish newsletters, and hold meetings where findings can be presented and discussed. Some are more academic and scholarly, while others are more social groups of amateurs who appreciate a chance to discuss their favourite writer with other hobbyists.

Historically, "literary society" has also referred to salons such as those of Madame de Stael, Madame Geoffrin and Madame de Tencin in Ancien Regime France, though these could more accurately be considered literary circles or coteries. Another meaning was of college literary societies, student groups specific to the United States.

The oldest formal societies for writing and promoting poetry are the chambers of rhetoric in the Low Countries, which date back to the Middle Ages.

== 19th century literary societies ==
- In Italy, the Società letteraria di Verona (1808).
- In Mexico, the Arcadia Mexicana (1808), the Academia de Letrán (1836) and the Liceo Hidalgo (1850).
- In Russia, the Arzamas Society (1815)
- In the United States, the Literary Club of Cincinnati (1849), is the oldest surviving literary society. The second oldest is the Literary Society of Washington, which was organized in 1874. Another example is the Romney Literary Society (1819–1886) in West Virginia.
- In France, Parnassian poets (c. 1866).
- In Canada, the University of King's College Literary Society, formerly the Haliburton Society (1884). It is the oldest literary society in the Commonwealth of Nations still in existence.
- In Australia, Women's Literary Society (c. 1890) flourished in Sydney.
- In Germany, the Tunnel über der Spree and the Georgekreis are among the most famous. However, the largest society are the Literarische Gesellschaft/Scheffelbund Karlsruhe, founded 1891 (in Schwetzingen, now Karlsruhe) in honor of Joseph Victor von Scheffel with about 7.000 members, and the Deutsche Schillergesellschaft (founded in 1895), honoring Friedrich Schiller and hosting the Deutsches Literaturarchiv Marbach, the largest private German literary archive with about 2.500 members.
- In India, the Bangiya Sahitya Parishad (1893), to promote Bengali literature

== 20th century literary societies ==
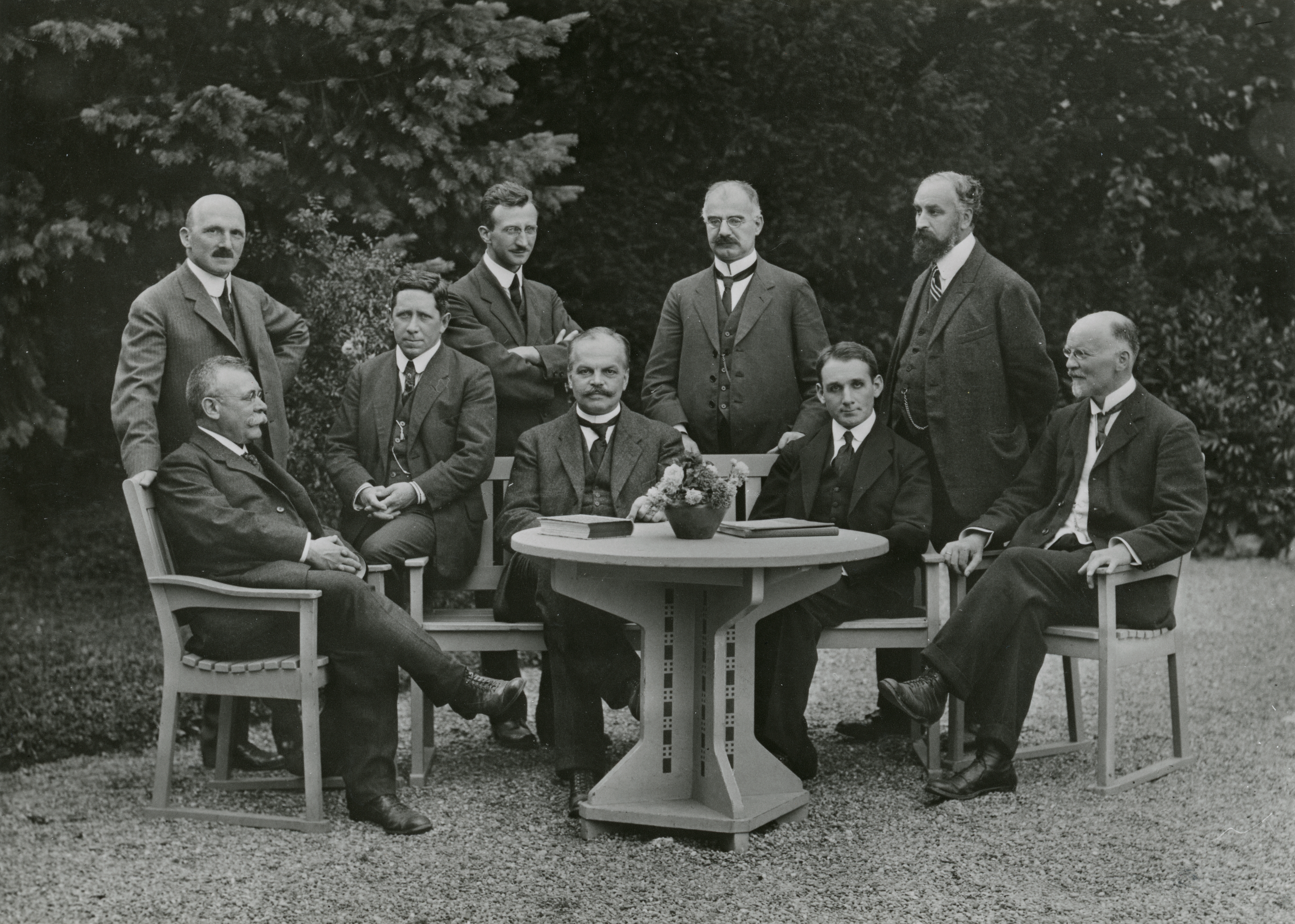
Founders meeting, Winterthur (CH)

- In the United Kingdom, The Kipling Society.
- In the United States, The Baker Street Irregulars, The Jane Austen Society of North America (5000 members), the Norman Mailer Society, and The Wolfe Pack.

== Country-specifics ==
=== U.S. College literary societies ===
There was a specialized form of the literary society which existed at American colleges and universities in the 19th century. The college literary societies were a part of virtually all academic institutions. Usually they existed in pairs at a particular campus, and would compete for members and prestige, and supplemented the classical studies of the curriculum with modern literature and current events. Many also maintained significant libraries, which often rivaled or surpassed the college library. When they disbanded, the libraries were typically given to the college. Even today, the oldest books in the early American colleges often bear the bookplate of a literary society.

=== U.S. Latin-letter societies ===
These are Latin-named and -themed organizations whose purposes vary from society to society. Activities include but are not limited to: The weekly presentation of papers written by society members, and a debate on its merits; Readings of members work and others', followed by discussion; literary Productions, which are practices in oratory skill; intramural sports teams; service events; and social gatherings. Meetings were often ended with snacks, such as peanuts or sardines. Singing and music also played a role in society life as musical instruments became more available. There are seven active literary societies at Illinois College. It is from the collegiate literary societies with Latin names that the earliest Greek organizations sprung. As an example, Beta Theta Pi fraternity was started by 8 students of the Union Literary Society at Miami University in 1839. Many early Greek chapters were started as a result of schism in the Latin societies. The Greek chapters were smaller, numbering from 8 to 15 at any given time. These were more intimate groups as compared to the societies. Confidences could be shared, promoting a certain amount of secrecy, which became an early hallmark of a Greek chapter. And as the Greek organizations grew, the literary societies declined. Some vestiges remain, but for the most part society life ended in the early twentieth century.

== See also ==
- Women's literary salons and societies in the Arab world
- Literary circle
- Hiram College Library

== Bibliography ==
Literary societies in America

- Canada
  - Murray, H. (2002). Come, Bright Improvement!: The Literary Societies of Nineteenth-century Ontario. University of Toronto Press.
- United States of America
  - Morton, Clay, 2006. "South of 'Typographic America': Orality, Literacy, and Nineteenth-Century Rhetorical Education," South Atlantic Review 71.4.
  - Kenny, Daniel J. (1895). Illustrated Guide to Cincinnati and the World's Columbian Exposition. R. Clarke.
  - Maxwell, Hu; Swisher, Howard Llewellyn (1897). History of Hampshire County, West Virginia From Its Earliest Settlement to the Present. Morgantown, West Virginia: A. Brown Boughner, Printer. p. 430. OCLC 680931891. OL 23304577M.
  - Nicolay, Helen (1935). Sixty Years of the Literary Society. Washington, D.C.: Literary Society of Washington.
- Mexico
  - Clark de Lara, B., & Speckman Guerra, E. (eds). (2005). La república de las letras: asomos a la cultura escrita del México decimonónico. Ambientes, asociaciones y grupos : movimientos, temas y géneros literarios. México: UNAM.
  - Perales, Ojeda A. (1957). Asociaciones literarias mexicanas: siglo XIX. México: Imprenta Universitaria.
  - Sánchez, J. (1951). Academias y sociedades literarias de Mexico. Chapel Hill, N.C.: University of North Carolina.

Europe and Australia

- Australia
  - Magarey, Susan (2001). Passions of the first wave feminists. Sydney: UNSW Press. ISBN 978-0-868-40780-7.
- Germany
  - Wiedemann, C. (2000). Berliner Klassik. Geselligkeit Datenbank. From: http://berlinerklassik.bbaw.de/BK/geselligkeit
  - Wülfing, W., Bruns, K., & Parr, R. (1998). Handbuch literarisch-kultureller Vereine, Gruppen und Bünde 1825–1933. Stuttgart: J.B. Metzler.
- Spain
  - Gelz, A. (2006). Tertulia: Literatur und Soziabilität im Spanien des 18. und 19. Jahrhunderts. Frankfurt am Main: Vervuert.
