= J. Michael Lennon =

American academic and biographer

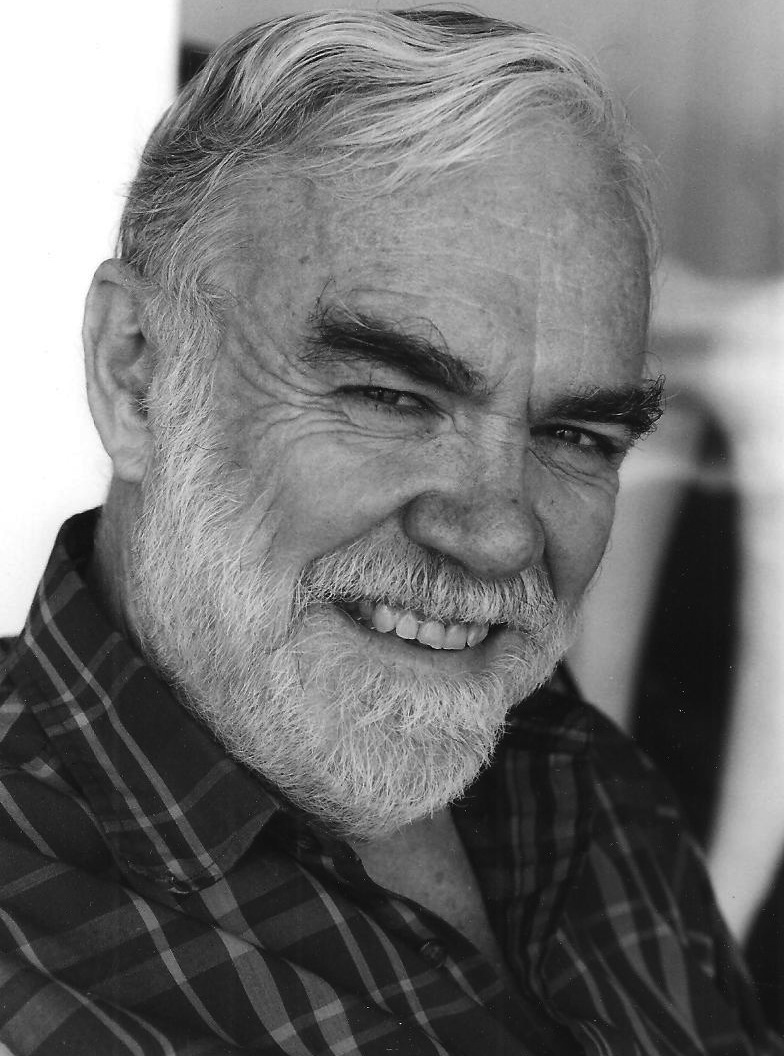
- Born: June 13, 1942 (age 84); Fall River, Massachusetts
- Education: Stonehill College
- Occupation: Professor
- Spouse: Donna Pedro Lennon
- Children: 3
- Writing career
- Genres: editor; biographer
- Website: jmichaellennon.com

J. Michael Lennon is an American academic and writer who is the Emeritus Professor of English at Wilkes University and the late Norman Mailer’s archivist and authorized biographer. He published Mailer's official biography Norman Mailer: A Double Life in 2013. He edited Mailer's selected letters in 2014 and the Library of America's two-volume set Norman Mailer: The Sixties in 2018.

== Early life ==
Lennon, a native of Cape Cod, grew up in Somerset, Massachusetts. He graduated from Stonehill College, a Catholic school south of Boston, in 1963 and became a U.S. Navy officer during the Vietnam War. After sea duty on the USS Uvalde for 30 months, he taught military law and history at Naval O.C.S. Newport in the late 1960s. He served five years on active duty (1964-1968).

He first encountered the work on Norman Mailer when he read The Naked and the Dead as a fifteen-year-old: "The language was uninhibited, the sexual descriptions, the descriptions of war. ... It's really an odyssey of suffering." He earned his M.A. (1969) and Ph.D. (1975) in English at the University of Rhode Island, where he began his scholarly work on Mailer in the classes of Dr. Nancy Potter, who directed his dissertation on Mailer's Armies of the Night.

== Lennon and Mailer ==
While working on his dissertation in 1971, Lennon watched Gore Vidal and Mailer's altercation on The Dick Cavett Show. Lennon wrote a letter of support to Mailer who then invited Lennon to hear him speak. Afterward, they met at a bar and began their long friendship and collaboration. Mailer enjoyed the Irish "bravura" and sense of humor, so he took an immediate liking to Lennon.

Lennon and his wife Donna and their sons became friendly with Mailer's family, including all nine children, and his sister Barbara Wasserman and her son Peter Alson, and enjoyed regular visits in the summers. Lennon became Mailer's literary executor in 1981 and proposed a collection of Mailer's essays and interviews which became the 1982 collection, Pieces and Pontifications, which Lennon edited. Mailer would later add: "Sometimes I think Mike Lennon and I were as designed for each other as some species of American Yin and Yang, as hot dogs, perhaps, and mustard. His talents, his discipline, and his ambition form a complement to all the slacks, voids, and indolences of my nature."

In 1988, Lennon edited Conversations with Norman Mailer, a collection of 34 of his interviews and a key source for those writing about Mailer. By this time, Mailer had begun sharing drafts of his books with Lennon, who began assembling a collection of his books, his uncollected reviews, essays, poems and letters to the editor, and everything in print he could find about Mailer.

At Lennon's suggestion, in 1994 the Mailer papers, previously housed in Manhattan, were moved to a large professional storage facility in Pennsylvania. This arrangement made it more convenient for Lennon and Mailer's current biographer and archivist Robert F. Lucid to have access. Lennon and his wife began to re-organize the papers, sifting and sorting through 500 cubic feet of paper. This led to work on a comprehensive annotated listing of Mailer's writings, and those about him. Norman Mailer: Works and Days, compiled by the Lennons, was published in 2000, with a preface from Mailer, and is the standard Mailer bibliography. Three years earlier, Lennon and Lucid assisted Mailer in putting together a mammoth collection of his writings, The Time of Our Time. Mailer's archive found its permanent home at the University of Texas' Harry Ransom Center in 2005. Lennon helped broker this $2.5 million deal.

In 2000, Lennon began the task of reading and selecting Mailer's letters. It took him almost three years to read all 45,000 letters (25 million words), and he remains the only person, save Mailer, who has read them all. Since Mailer was open and frank in his letters, Lennon explains to Sipiora, they became the most important sources for the biography.

In 1997, the Lennons purchased a condo in Provincetown a short walk from the Mailer house, and spent weekends and summers there. The Lennons often played Texas Hold'em with Mailer, enjoying the play, friendly banter, and Jameson's. In Mailer's later years, the Lennon's would become honorary members of the Mailer family.

In 2003, a volume of Mailer's insights on writing, The Spooky Art, was published, edited by Lennon. It contains excerpts from previously published items by Mailer, excerpts from interviews Mailer had given, and fifty original pieces written for the book.

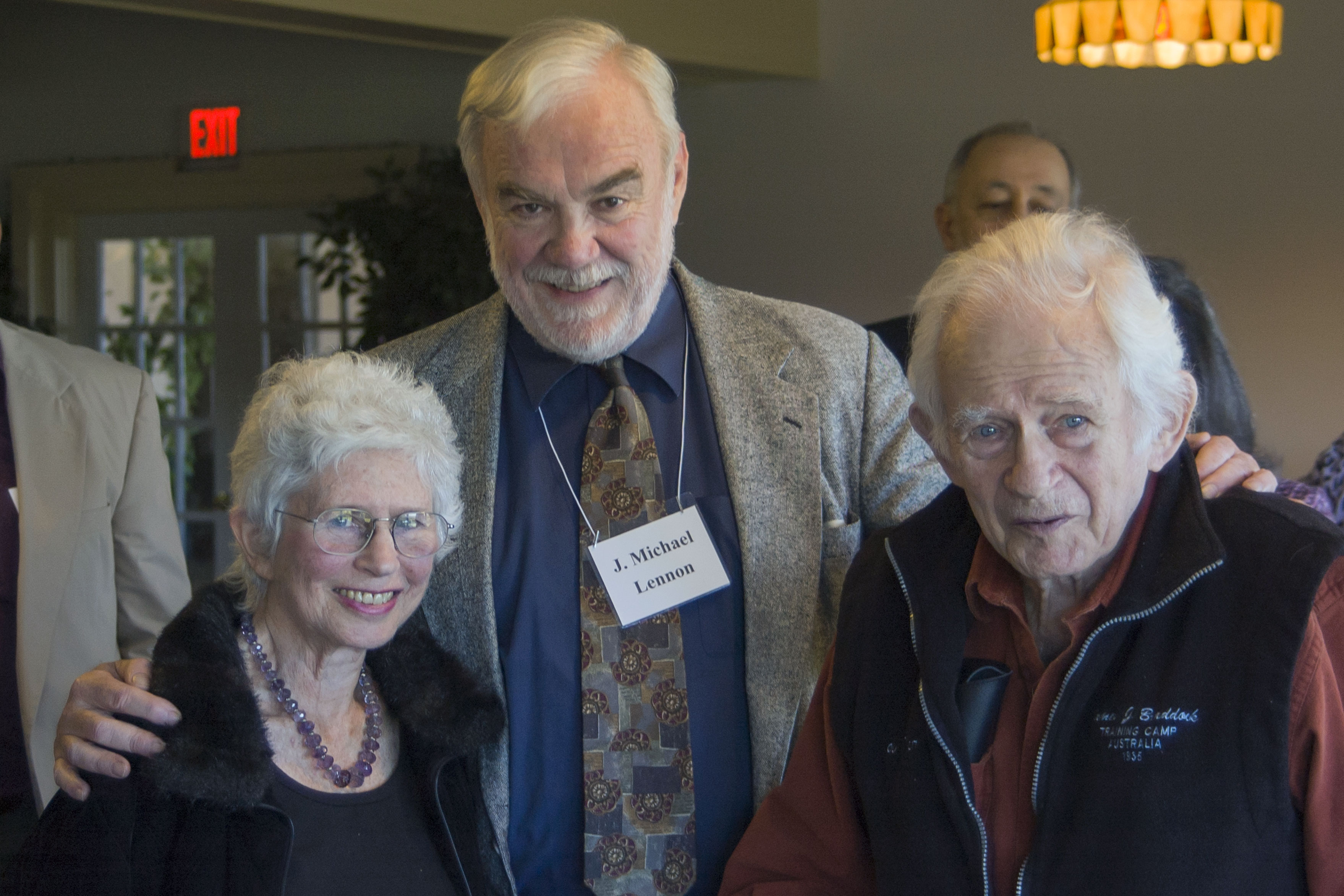
Barbara Wasserman, Mike Lennon, and Norman Mailer in 2006

When Lucid died unexpectedly in December 2006, Lennon, always Lucid's understudy, took over as authorized biographer—what he called "a comfortable job" after their 35-year acquaintance. A year later Mailer died. Lennon, Lawrence Schiller and Mailer's widow, Norris Church Mailer, produced the memorial to Mailer at Carnegie Hall in the spring of 2008.

In 2008, Lennon signed a contract with Simon and Schuster for the biography. He also entered into an agreement with the Mailer Estate granting him full access to the Mailer letters and unpublished manuscripts. Lennon and his wife moved full-time to their condo in Provincetown where Mailer had begun writing his final novel, The Castle in the Forest (2007), in fall of 2000.

Lennon had kept extended notes on Mailer's table talk, and also interviewed him on many aspects of his public and private life. Lennon's unpublished "Mailer Log," his record of Mailer's last three years, runs to 150,000 words. The summer before Mailer died, he and Lennon completed work on a series of interviews on Mailer's theological ideas and theories. The ten long discussions were published as On God: An Uncommon Conversation just days before Mailer died.

Over the next four years Lennon interviewed 86 people, including his ex-wives, children, cousins, sister, nephew, and many close personal and literary friends, including Don DeLillo, Gay Talese, Robert Silvers, Barbara Probst Solomon, David Ebershoff, Ivan Fisher, Eileen Fredrikson, Lois Wilson, Carol Holmes, Tina Brown, Harry Evans, James Toback, Nan Talese, Dotson Rader, Doris and Dick Goodwin, William Kennedy, Richard Stratton, Mickey Knox, and Lawrence Schiller, Mailer's most important collaborator. Schiller gave Lennon access to all of his interviews with Lawrence Grobel which became important for understanding the Schiller-Mailer relationship.

Schiller also enlisted Lennon to edit four new editions of Mailer books, including The Fight, Marilyn, and Of a Fire on the Moon for Taschen books. The Lennons made several month-long visits to the Mailer archives in Texas, in 2008 and 2009, and in the fall of 2009, he began writing, breaking his daily routine only to conduct interviews. At the end of October 2012, after six years of writing and research, he submitted the biography to Simon and Schuster.

In 2018, Lennon was criticized for asserting in an interview that Mailer "was never accused of hurting any women", before being reminded by the interviewer that Mailer had stabbed his wife.

== Academic life ==
Lennon got his first teaching job at the University of Illinois at Springfield in 1972. Lennon moved into academic administration in the late 1970s, and became publisher of Illinois Issues magazine, and the director of what is now WUIS-FM. These and other units (a public TV station and small press later on) were eventually combined into the University's Institute of Public Affairs, and he became its first executive director in 1988. He continued to teach and assisted University of Pennsylvania professor, Robert F. Lucid, then Mailer's authorized biographer and archivist. In 1992, Lennon was appointed Vice President for Academic Affairs at Wilkes University in Wilkes-Barre, PA.

While at Wilkes, Lennon also served as co-director of the Wilkes University low-residency MA/MFA in Creative Writing, a program which he founded in 2004, along with current Program Director Bonnie Culver. In 2000 after nine years on the job, Lennon stepped down from the V.P. position. He moved to the English Department which he chaired for two years. He is Emeritus Vice President for Academic Affairs and Emeritus Professor of English at Wilkes University. He continues to teach in the Wilkes M.F.A. Program and The Mailer Colony, and serves on the advisory boards of both. He served from 2005-2007 as a literary consultant at the Harry Ransom Center, University of Texas at Austin, where he assisted in the cataloging of Mailer's papers, and was a Fellow there in 2009.

== Research and publications ==
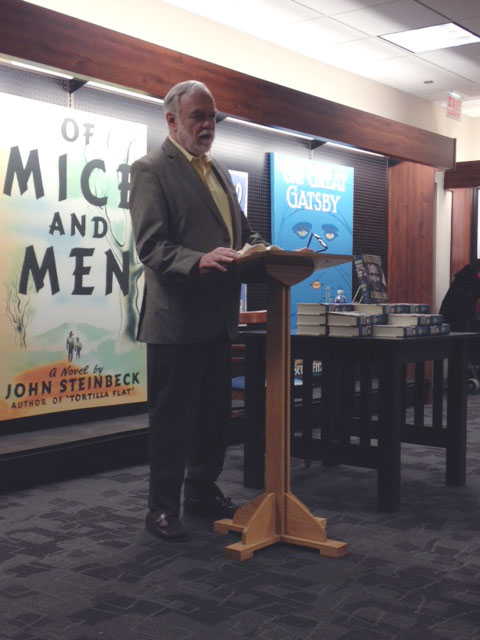
J. Michael Lennon reads at Barnes and Noble in March 2014.

Norman Mailer: A Double Life was published on October 15, 2013, seven years after Lennon took the mantle from Lucid. Lennon based his 320,000-word biography primarily on Mailer's prodigious epistolary output and a series of over-200 interviews with family, friends, and collaborators of Mailer's. Early on, Mailer granted a score of interviews with Lennon and encouraged him to "put everything in," warts and all, censoring nothing. Lennon chose the title Double Life because he saw that Mailer had two minds about most anything of consequence, reflecting his belief that everyone's psyche has two separate personalities. "Every identity that he had—and he had dozens of identities, occupations and avatars, whether he was playing author, playwright, politician or raconteur—always had another half to it", Lennon states. "I think part of it was because he was always interested in 'The Other,' the minority of good in evil people and the minority of evil in good people. He was always looking for that minority that would help define and give personality to other people". An aspect of Mailer's double life also includes his being born between two generations: one as part of the post-World War II writers like James Jones and the other as participant of the sixties' New Journalism. Lennon's challenge included adding as much information about Mailer's private life as he did about Mailer's well-known public exploits. "Mailer knew me as an archivist and a bibliographer and a fact fetishist who collected the bits of his life and work", Lennon says; "I really tried to bring in material that no one had ever seen before, and God knows I had plenty of it".

Reviews of A Double Life have been mostly positive and enthusiastic. O'Hagan states that "Lennon often puts his finger on the kind of detail that makes sense of Mailer's character" and "Lennon's biography is dense with careful detail" presenting "more of Mailer than we’ve had from anyone other than Mailer". French calls it "a riveting blow-by-blow account of a vigorous life", and Elliott avers that Lennon "does an admirable job of allowing Mailer's various iterations of himself to emerge without judgment or apology". Elliott calls Double Life an "excellent academic resource with over 100 pages of endnotes—a treasure for literary scholars" that is "enlightening, lively, and a pleasure to read, it is almost certain to become the standard Mailer biography". LaRoche suggests that DL "may be the definitive biography of one of the most important writers of the second half of the 20th century." Moore adds that the biography is a "behemoth of appropriate scope to frame a man who led a big life," and Pritchard writes that DL "won't be improved upon" as it "is a feat [Lennon] performs with care and without pomposity." Margulies writes of A Double Life: "Lennon manages to resist inserting a personal agenda into the biography and, as such, it reads as a rare and true portrait of the writer, who insisted that his biographer 'put everything in'".

In 2014, Lennon published a volume of Mailer's letters in The Selected Letters of Norman Mailer. Including 714 letters, this volume published by Random House includes an introduction, 90 pages of notes, and a bibliography. It's a comprehensive volume of letters spanning 1940–2007, giving readers a glimpse into Mailer's dressing room. It includes letters to celebrities like James Baldwin, Saul Bellow, Jorge Luis Borges, Fidel Castro, Martin Luther King Jr., Kate Millett, and Hillary Rodham Clinton, and also personal missives to fans, critics, editors, friends, family and ordinary people. Dwight Gardner calls it a collection of "mostly minor gleanings from a major writer" that, however, has "umpteen pleasures to pluck out and roll between your teeth, like seeds from a pomegranate". It's a "scintillating read," reviews John Winters, that gives readers a glimpse into Mailer's "extraordinary candor". John R. Coyne opines that Selected Letters is a "well-written and thoughtful study so comprehensive that it seemed to obviate the need for any further biographical data," and Ronald Fried states that his letters shows Mailer's almost innocent notion that he could make the world better and they emerge "as essential to the work that would become his indelible contribution to America literature."

Norman Mailer: Works and Days (2000) received a Choice magazine award for "outstanding scholarly title" in 2001, and has recently been expanded for a digital humanities project and a new edition, published by the Norman Mailer Society. Books he has edited include Critical Essays on Norman Mailer (1986), Conversations with Norman Mailer (1988), The James Jones Reader (1991, with James Giles), The Spooky Art: Some Thoughts on Writing (2003), and Norman Mailer’s Letters on An American Dream, 1963-69 (2004). His work has appeared in The New Yorker, The Paris Review, The Mailer Review, James Jones Literary Society Journal, Playboy, Creative Nonfiction, New York, Modern Fiction Studies, Modern Language Studies, The Chicago Tribune, Narrative, and The Journal of Modern Literature, among others. He co-authored with Mailer On God: An Uncommon Conversation (2007). Most recently, he edited Moonfire: The Epic Journey of Apollo 11 (Taschen 2009), an abridged version of Mailer's 1971 narrative, Of a Fire on the Moon, with hundreds of NASA photographs; and Norman Mailer/Bert Stern: Marilyn Monroe (Taschen 2011).

Lennon also wrote about James Jones and edited (with James Giles) a collection of Jones' war writings, The James Jones Reader in 1991. He also co-produced (with Jeffrey Davis) a 1985 PBS documentary on Jones, James Jones: From Reveille to Taps, in which Mailer gave a key interview. Lennon and Davis assembled a 1987 piece on Jones for The Paris Review titled “Glimpses: James Jones, 1921-1977,” drawn from the documentary.

Lennon, along with co-author Donna Pedro Lennon and editor Gerald R. Lucas, won the Robert F. Lucid Award for Mailer Studies in 2019 for the revised edition of Norman Mailer: Works and Days.

== Affiliations ==
Lennon helped found The Norman Mailer Society and The James Jones Literary Society. He served as president of the former until 2017 and the latter until 1995. Lennon serves on the Executive Board of the Norman Mailer Center and the Norman Mailer Society. He is also the Chair of the Editorial Board of The Mailer Review.

== Personal life ==
Lennon has been married to Donna Pedro Lennon, a Newporter who also attended the University of Rhode Island, since October 15, 1966. They are the parents of three sons, Stephen (1967), Joseph (1968) and James (1969), and four grandchildren named Nicholas, Sean, Liam, and Rory. They currently live in Bryn Mawr, PA.

== Published work ==
Author

- Mailer's Last Days: New and Selected Remembrances of a Life in Literature (2022).
- Norman Mailer: A Double Life (2013).

Co-Author

- On God: An Uncommon Conversation (2007), with Norman Mailer.
- Norman Mailer: Works and Days (2000), with Donna Pedro Lennon.
- Norman Mailer: Works and Days Revised and Expanded (2018), with Donna Lennon; edited by Gerald Lucas.

Editor

- Lipton's: A Marijuana Journal, 1954–1955 (2023), with Gerald R. Lucas and Susan Mailer
- Norman Mailer: Collected Essays of the 1960s (2018)
- Norman Mailer: Four Books of the 1960s (2018)
- Selected Letters of Norman Mailer (2014).
- Marilyn Monroe (2011), with Norman Mailer and Bert Stern.
- Moonfire: The Epic Journey of Apollo 11 (2009).
- Norman Mailer’s Letters on An American Dream, 1963-69 (2004).
- The Spooky Art: Some Thoughts on Writing (2003).
- The James Jones Reader (1991), with James Giles.
- Conversations with Norman Mailer (1988).
- Critical Essays on Norman Mailer (1986).
