= Olivia Rutigliano =

American writer and critic

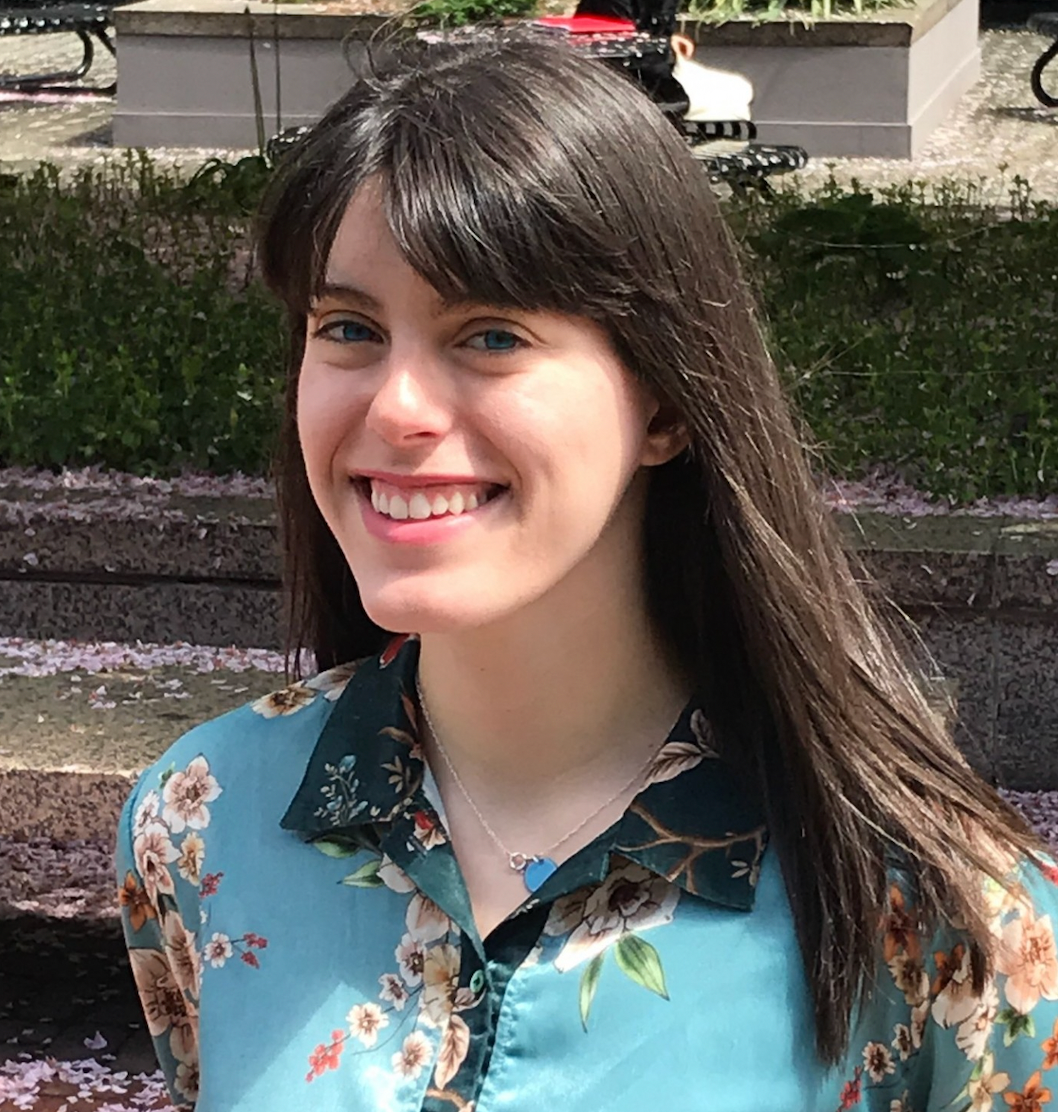
- Born: April 29, 1992 (age 34); Queens, New York
- Education: Columbia University, University of Pennsylvania
- Occupation: Writer
- Spouse: John Buffalo Mailer
- Writing career
- Genres: editor, critic, historian, filmmaker
- Website: oliviarutigliano.com

Olivia Rutigliano is a writer and editor based in New York City. She is recognized for her work in cultural and film criticism, with an emphasis on crime and mystery genres. She is currently an editor at Literary Hub and CrimeReads and a book editor at their parent company, Grove Atlantic. Rutigliano holds a Ph.D. from Columbia University, where her academic research focused on the performative character of the Victorian detective.

== Education ==
Rutigliano's academic background includes a Ph.D. from Columbia University in the Departments of Theatre, and English and Comparative Literature. She also holds an MPhil and MA in English (specializing in theater) from Columbia University, as well as an MA in English and Honors BA in Cinema Studies and English from the University of Pennsylvania, where she developed an interest in storytelling across genres and media. Rutigliano was the Marion E. Ponsford fellow while at Columbia University. She has received two fellowships from the Andrew W. Mellon Foundation.

Her academic specialty is nineteenth-century British literature and theater, but she has broader interests in popular entertainment/mass media, spectacle, detectives, heists, capitalism, labour, class, aesthetics, book history, and gender from the nineteenth century through the present. Her doctoral dissertation is titled "The Performing Detective: Spectacle and Investigation in Victorian Literature and Theater."

== Career ==
Rutigliano is an Editor at Literary Hub and CrimeReads, where she has worked since July 2019. As of November 2023, she also holds the title of Editor at the publishing house Grove Atlantic, where she acquires new titles and expands Grove's footprint in the crime and mystery genres. Rutigliano primarily writes long- and short-form pieces of cultural and film criticism. Her work has appeared in various publications such as Vanity Fair, Vulture, Lapham's Quarterly, Public Books, The Baffler, The Los Angeles Review of Books, Points in Case, and Truly Adventurous. She has also been a contributing editor at the film magazine Bright Wall/Dark Room. She has given talks and appeared on panels at Film Forum, The McKittrick Hotel/Sleep No More, NYU's Poe Room, the Brooklyn Book Festival, the Rosenbach Museum, the Salmagundi Club, Georgetown University's Humanities Initiative, and bookstores and salons throughout New York City. She is a member of The Baker Street Irregulars.

Currently, she hosts Culture Schlock, a Podcast produced by LitHub Radio.

== Research and specializations ==
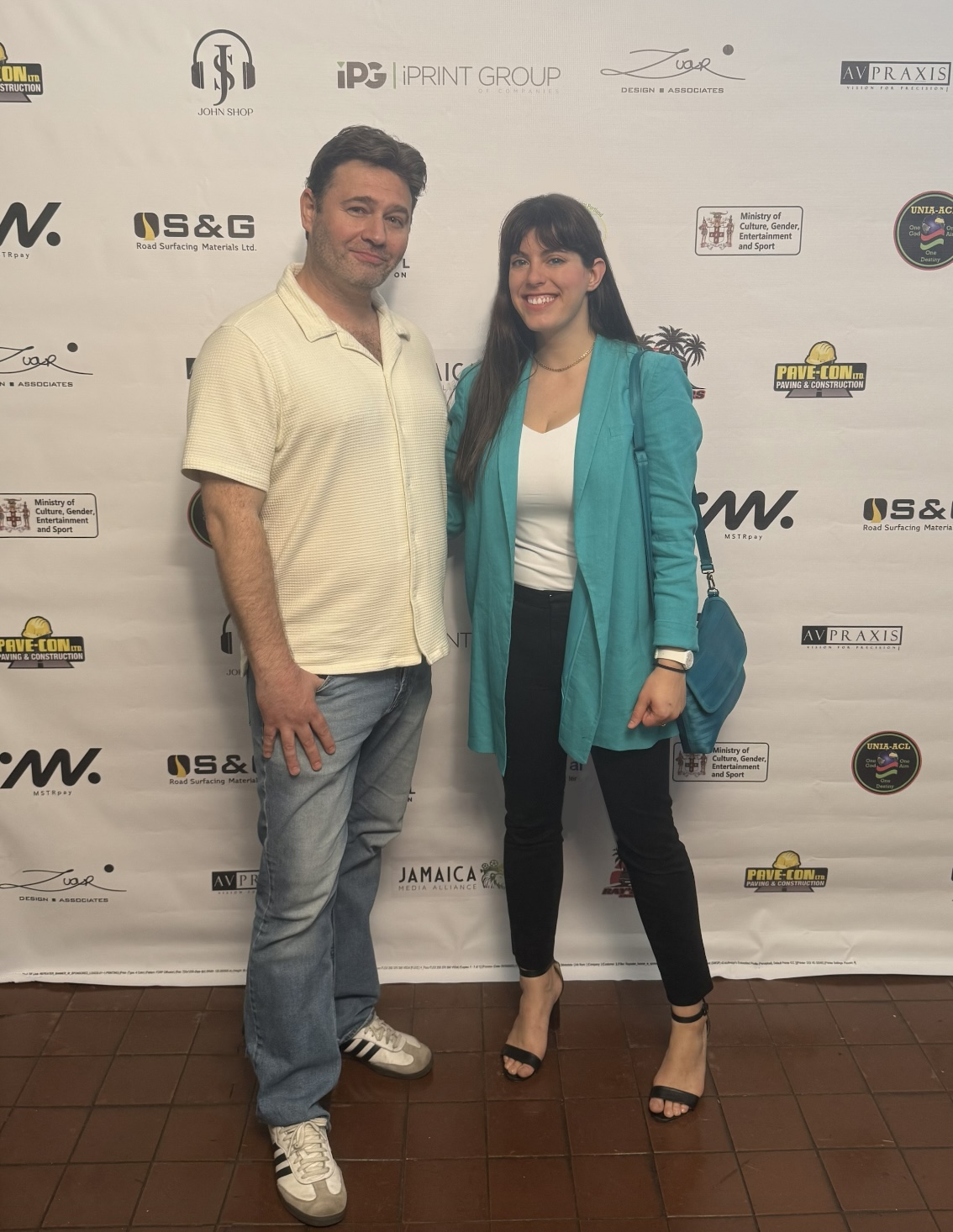
Olivia Rutigliano and John Buffalo Mailer in Jamaica, 2025.

Rutigliano's non-academic writing often focuses on the history of popular entertainment, specifically early Hollywood and the Academy Awards. She has become known as an expert on stolen Oscars, having done extensive research on the topic. She has tracked 79 Oscars that have been involved in various mishaps, and determined that 12 are still missing. Rutigliano's work has uncovered the truth behind the legend of Alice Brady's supposedly stolen Oscar.

In February 2026, Rutigliano was quoted as an expert source in two major film features — in Town & Country and Esquire — on the occasion of Emerald Fennell's adaptation of Wuthering Heights, discussing the novel's adaptation history and literary significance.

Her writing has been featured in Mother Jones, Forbes, and Dubai's AIR magazine, as well as on the radio. She is interested in storytelling, popular culture, genre fiction, fiction writing, and film.

== Other notable works ==
Rutigliano's narrative historical essay, "The Joke", is being optioned in partnership with Elle Fanning, who recorded it as an episode of Vespucci's "Paperless" podcast. In 2014, she wrote a PBS television special starring the opera singer Renée Fleming. She directed the short film "Walden", which was published in The Toast. She has also completed an ethnographic documentary about Yugoslavian female refugees immigrating to the United States in the mid-twentieth century.

== Personal life ==
Rutigliano is married to John Buffalo Mailer; they have one child together.
