= Donald J. Sobol =

American novelist

- Born: October 4, 1924; The Bronx, New York City, US
- Died: July 11, 2012 (aged 87); South Miami, Florida, US
- Occupation: Novelist
- Spouse: Rose Tiplitz
- Children: 4
- Writing career
- Period: 1958–2012
- Genre: Juvenile mystery
- Notable work: Encyclopedia Brown

Donald J. Sobol (October 4, 1924 – July 11, 2012) was an American author best known for his children's books, especially the Encyclopedia Brown mystery series.

== Early life and education ==
Donald J. Sobol was born in The Bronx, New York City, on October 4, 1924, to Ira J. Sobol, who owned gas stations he eventually sold to Standard Oil, and Ida (Gelula) Sobol. His middle initial did not stand for anything. Donald Sobol attended the NYC Ethical Culture Fieldston School and then served for two years during World War II with the Army Corps of Engineers in the Pacific Theatre. Sobol graduated from Oberlin College with a degree in English literature in 1948.

== Career ==
Sobol's career began as a copy boy for the New York Sun, and he eventually worked his way up to reporter. In 1949, he started work at the Daily News and remained there for two years. After a brief stint as a buyer at Macy's in New York, he moved to Florida and started writing full-time.

He started writing the syndicated series Two-Minute Mysteries in 1958, starring criminologist Dr. Haledjian. It proved very popular and ran for more than ten years. In 1963, he started writing the Encyclopedia Brown series, featuring Leroy "Encyclopedia" Brown, a schoolboy who was an amateur sleuth. Compared with the Two-Minute Mysteries series, which features crimes as serious as murder, the Encyclopedia Brown books are more juvenile-oriented, often dealing with matters such as pranks or petty theft. Sobol's Encyclopedia Brown titles have never been out of print and have been translated into twelve languages. Sobol was rejected two dozen times before his first Encyclopedia Brown book was published. The Encyclopedia Brown series was adapted for television.

In 1975, the Mystery Writers of America honored Sobol and his Encyclopedia Brown series with a Special Edgar Award. The last book in the series penned by Sobol, Encyclopedia Brown and the Case of the Soccer Scheme, was published in October 2012, three months after the author's death.

Sobol wrote the children's novel Secret Agents Four, in which a group of Miami teenagers attempt to thwart foreign saboteurs. Sobol also penned the non-fiction book True Sea Adventures, published in 1975.

Sobol authored more than 65 books, and continued working until the final month of his life. In addition to the books he wrote for children, Sobol also wrote a number of nonfiction books on topics ranging from US civil war history to investing. He also wrote and contributed to magazines under a variety of pen names. His manuscripts are stored at the University of Minnesota, in the Kerlan Collection.

== Personal life and death ==
Sobol was married to Rose (née Tiplitz) who was both an engineer and author. The Sobols had four children: Diane, Glenn, Eric, and John, and had four grandchildren.

Sobol died from gastric lymphoma at a hospital in South Miami, Florida, on July 11, 2012, at the age of 87.

== Selected works ==
=== Encyclopedia Brown ===
The Encyclopedia Brown books, in order of publication (parentheses indicate numbers on original release cover art):

1. Encyclopedia Brown, Boy Detective (1963, ISBN 0-525-67200-1, 1982 reissue ISBN 0-553-15724-8)
2. Encyclopedia Brown Strikes Again (1965, ISBN 0-590-01650-4, reissued as Encyclopedia Brown and the Case of the Secret Pitch, ISBN 0-525-67202-8)
3. Encyclopedia Brown Finds the Clues (1966, ISBN 0-525-67204-4)
4. Encyclopedia Brown Gets His Man (1967, ISBN 0-525-67206-0)
5. Encyclopedia Brown Solves Them All (1968, ISBN 0-525-67212-5)
6. Encyclopedia Brown Keeps the Peace (1969, ISBN 0-525-67208-7)
7. Encyclopedia Brown Saves the Day (1970, ISBN 0-525-67210-9)
8. Encyclopedia Brown Tracks Them Down (1971, ISBN 0-553-15721-3)
9. Encyclopedia Brown Shows the Way (1972, ISBN 0170057828)
10. Encyclopedia Brown Takes the Case (1973, ISBN 0-553-15723-X)
11. Encyclopedia Brown Lends a Hand (1974, ISBN 0-553-48133-9, reissued as Encyclopedia Brown and the Case of the Exploding Plumbing and Other Mysteries, ISBN 0-590-44093-4)
12. Encyclopedia Brown and the Case of the Dead Eagles (1975, ISBN 0-590-43343-1)
13. Encyclopedia Brown and the Case of the Midnight Visitor (1977, ISBN 0-553-15586-5)
14. Encyclopedia Brown Carries On (1980, ISBN 0-02-786190-2)
15. Encyclopedia Brown Sets the Pace (1981, ISBN 0-02-786200-3)
16. (15½) Encyclopedia Brown Takes the Cake (co-written with Glenn Andrews, 1982, ISBN 0-590-07843-7)
17. (16) Encyclopedia Brown and the Case of the Mysterious Handprints (1985, ISBN 0-553-15739-6)
18. (17) Encyclopedia Brown and the Case of the Treasure Hunt (1988, ISBN 0-553-15650-0)
19. (18) Encyclopedia Brown and the Case of the Disgusting Sneakers (1990, ISBN 0-688-09012-5)
20. (19) Encyclopedia Brown and the Case of the Two Spies (1995, ISBN 0-385-32036-1)
21. (20) Encyclopedia Brown and the Case of Pablo's Nose (1996, ISBN 0-385-32184-8)
22. (21) Encyclopedia Brown and the Case of the Sleeping Dog (1998, ISBN 0-385-32576-2)
23. (22) Encyclopedia Brown and the Case of the Slippery Salamander (2000, ISBN 0-385-32579-7)
24. (23) Encyclopedia Brown and the Case of the Jumping Frogs (2003, ISBN 0-385-72931-6)
25. (24) Encyclopedia Brown Cracks the Case (2007, ISBN 978-0-525-47924-6)
26. (25) Encyclopedia Brown, Super Sleuth (2009, ISBN 978-0-525-42100-9)
27. (26) Encyclopedia Brown and the Case of the Secret UFOs (2010, ISBN 978-0-525-42210-5)
28. (27) Encyclopedia Brown and the Case of the Carnival Crime (2011, ISBN 978-0-525-42211-2)
29. (28) Encyclopedia Brown and the Case of the Soccer Scheme (2012, ISBN 978-0-525-42582-3)

=== Two-Minute Mysteries ===
The Two-Minute Mysteries series, in order of publication:

1. Two-Minute Mysteries (1967, ISBN 059008111X)
2. More Two-Minute Mysteries (1971, ISBN 0590447882)
3. Still More Two-Minute Mysteries (1975, ISBN 0606011668)
