= The Mailer Review =

Academic journal

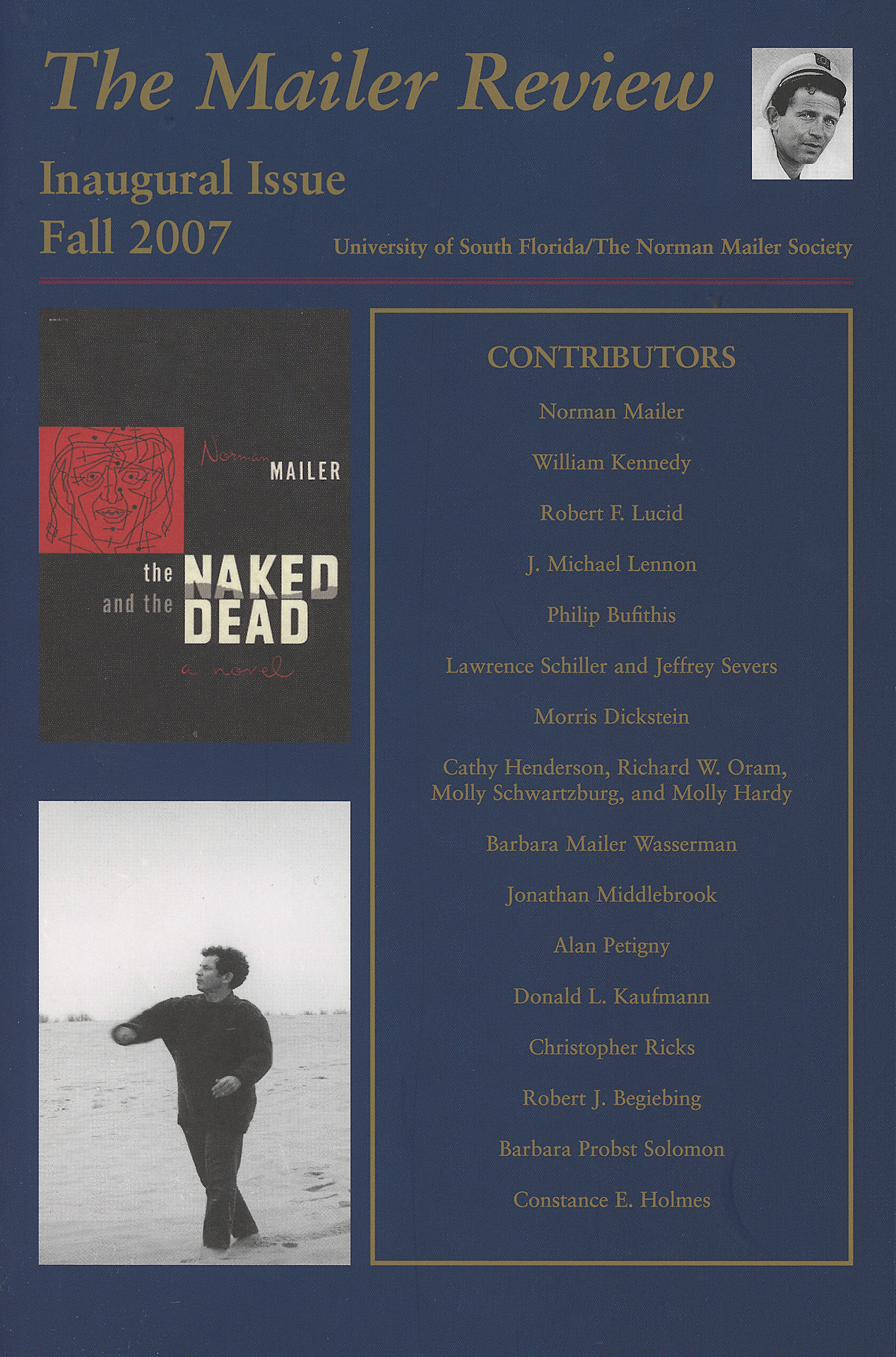
- Discipline: Literature
- Language: English
- Edited by: Phillip Sipiora

Publication details
- History: 2007-present
- Publisher: The Norman Mailer Society; the University of South Florida English Department (United States)
- Frequency: Annually
- Open access: yes

Standard abbreviations
- ISO 4: Mail. Rev.

Indexing
- ISSN: 1936-4687
- OCLC no.: 86175502

Links
- Journal homepage

The Mailer Review is a peer-reviewed academic journal established in 2007 by the Norman Mailer Society and edited at the University of South Florida's Department of English. The purpose of the journal is to maintain the legacy of eponym Norman Mailer. The Review publishes original scholarship, book reviews, fiction, poetry, tributes, bibliographies, and interviews. Contributors have included Norman Mailer, Don DeLillo, William Kennedy, J. Michael Lennon, Christopher Hitchens, and Lawrence Schiller.

The founder and editor is Phillip Sipiora of USF. The journal is published annually in the fall.

== History ==
During the fourth annual conference in Provincetown (October 12–14, 2006), the membership voted to establish the brainchild of Phillip Sipiora, The Mailer Review, co-sponsored by the University of South Florida and edited by Sipiora and co-edited by Gerald Lucas and Michael L. Shuman. It was originally proposed to publish twice a year and contain "objective articles, including scholarly, biographical, bibliographical and cultural essays [by] a wide range of writers and views". The Review "contains a broad range of expertly edited essays, reviews, memoirs, documentary material, and a number of heretofore unpublished short works by Mailer, [and] is a major contributor to Mailer's legacy". J. Michael Lennon, then the Society's president, said the journal will realize the Society's goal to produce "something that is going to be relevant and accessible".

The inaugural issue of Review arrived on newsstands on October 18, 2007. Since, the Review has published one volume annually for a total of ten in 2017. Dwight Garner called the premiere issue of the Review a "fascinating testament to Mailer's headlong life." Recent issues of the Review have included never-before-published short stories from Norman Mailer's archive at the Harry Ransom Center at the University of Texas at Austin.

No impact factor is provided for the Review by Clarivate. No article in the Review had been listed by Google Scholar since 2017.

== See also ==
- Norman Mailer Society
- Norman Mailer bibliography
