= List of The New York Times number-one books of 1948 =

This is a list of books that topped The New York Times best-seller list in 1948.

== Fiction ==
The following list ranks the number-one best-selling fiction books.

The American publisher Bennett Cerf noted that there had been "only three novels published [in 1948] that were worth reading ... Cry, The Beloved Country, The Ides of March, and The Naked and the Dead." Only Cry did not top the list that year. A total of ten other novels did, however, with most titles spending only a few weeks at the top. The strongest performing title was The Naked and the Dead, Norman Mailer's first best seller, published when he was just 25 years old, which spent 19 weeks at Number 1 and more than 6 months in the top 10. It was the first "big" novel about World War II, based on his own experiences. The Ides of March was by Thornton Wilder and it spent 2 weeks at Number 1 but only 13 weeks in the top 15. The year ended with The Big Fisherman heading the list, Lloyd C. Douglas's follow-up to his huge 1942 best seller, The Robe.

Date	Book	Author
January 4	House Divided	Ben Ames Williams
January 11	House Divided	Ben Ames Williams
January 18	House Divided	Ben Ames Williams
January 25	House Divided	Ben Ames Williams
February 1	House Divided	Ben Ames Williams
February 8	East Side, West Side	Marcia Davenport
February 15	East Side, West Side	Marcia Davenport
February 22	House Divided	Ben Ames Williams
February 29	House Divided	Ben Ames Williams
March 7	Eagle in the Sky	Van Wyck Mason
March 14	Eagle in the Sky	Van Wyck Mason
March 21	Eagle in the Sky	Van Wyck Mason
March 28	Eagle in the Sky	Van Wyck Mason
April 4	The Ides of March	Thornton Wilder
April 11	Eagle in the Sky	Van Wyck Mason
April 18	The Ides of March	Thornton Wilder
April 25	Raintree County	Ross Lockridge Jr.
May 2	Raintree County	Ross Lockridge Jr.
May 9	Pilgrim's Inn	Elizabeth Goudge
May 16	Raintree County	Ross Lockridge Jr.
May 23	Pilgrim's Inn	Elizabeth Goudge
May 30	Raintree County	Ross Lockridge Jr.
June 6	Pilgrim's Inn	Elizabeth Goudge
June 13	Pilgrim's Inn	Elizabeth Goudge
June 20	The Naked and the Dead	Norman Mailer
June 27	The Naked and the Dead	Norman Mailer
July 4	The Naked and the Dead	Norman Mailer
July 11	The Naked and the Dead	Norman Mailer
July 18	The Naked and the Dead	Norman Mailer
July 25	The Naked and the Dead	Norman Mailer
August 1	The Naked and the Dead	Norman Mailer
August 8	The Naked and the Dead	Norman Mailer
August 15	The Naked and the Dead	Norman Mailer
August 22	The Naked and the Dead	Norman Mailer
August 29	The Naked and the Dead	Norman Mailer
September 5	Shannon's Way	A. J. Cronin
September 12	Shannon's Way	A. J. Cronin
September 19	The Naked and the Dead	Norman Mailer
September 26	Shannon's Way	A. J. Cronin
October 3	The Naked and the Dead	Norman Mailer
October 10	The Naked and the Dead	Norman Mailer
October 17	The Naked and the Dead	Norman Mailer
October 24	The Naked and the Dead	Norman Mailer
October 31	The Naked and the Dead	Norman Mailer
November 7	The Young Lions	Irwin Shaw
November 14	The Naked and the Dead	Norman Mailer
November 21	The Naked and the Dead	Norman Mailer
November 28	The Young Lions	Irwin Shaw
December 5	The Young Lions	Irwin Shaw
December 12	The Young Lions	Irwin Shaw
December 19	The Big Fisherman	Lloyd C. Douglas
December 26	The Big Fisherman	Lloyd C. Douglas

== Nonfiction ==
The following list ranks the number-one best-selling nonfiction books.

Date	Book	Author
January 4	Speaking Frankly	James F. Byrnes
January 11	Inside U.S.A.	John Gunther
January 18	Inside U.S.A.	John Gunther
January 25	Inside U.S.A.	John Gunther
February 1	Inside U.S.A.	John Gunther
February 8	Inside U.S.A.	John Gunther
February 15	Inside U.S.A.	John Gunther
February 22	Peace of Mind	Joshua L. Liebman
February 29	Peace of Mind	Joshua L. Liebman
March 7	Peace of Mind	Joshua L. Liebman
March 14	Peace of Mind	Joshua L. Liebman
March 21	Peace of Mind	Joshua L. Liebman
March 28	Peace of Mind	Joshua L. Liebman
April 4	Peace of Mind	Joshua L. Liebman
April 11	Peace of Mind	Joshua L. Liebman
April 18	Peace of Mind	Joshua L. Liebman
April 25	Peace of Mind	Joshua L. Liebman
May 2	Peace of Mind	Joshua L. Liebman
May 9	Peace of Mind	Joshua L. Liebman
May 16	Peace of Mind	Joshua L. Liebman
May 23	Sexual Behavior in the Human Male	Alfred Kinsey
May 30	Peace of Mind	Joshua L. Liebman
June 6	Peace of Mind	Joshua L. Liebman
June 13	Peace of Mind	Joshua L. Liebman
June 20	Peace of Mind	Joshua L. Liebman
June 27	Peace of Mind	Joshua L. Liebman
July 4	Peace of Mind	Joshua L. Liebman
July 11	Peace of Mind	Joshua L. Liebman
July 18	Peace of Mind	Joshua L. Liebman
July 25	Peace of Mind	Joshua L. Liebman
August 1	How to Stop Worrying and Start Living	Dale Carnegie
August 8	The Gathering Storm	Winston Churchill
August 15	Peace of Mind	Joshua L. Liebman
August 22	The Gathering Storm	Winston Churchill
August 29	The Gathering Storm	Winston Churchill
September 5	The Gathering Storm	Winston Churchill
September 12	The Gathering Storm	Winston Churchill
September 19	How to Stop Worrying and Start Living	Dale Carnegie
September 26	How to Stop Worrying and Start Living	Dale Carnegie
October 3	How to Stop Worrying and Start Living	Dale Carnegie
October 10	How to Stop Worrying and Start Living	Dale Carnegie
October 17	How to Stop Worrying and Start Living	Dale Carnegie
October 24	How to Stop Worrying and Start Living	Dale Carnegie
October 31	How to Stop Worrying and Start Living	Dale Carnegie
November 7	How to Stop Worrying and Start Living	Dale Carnegie
November 14	How to Stop Worrying and Start Living	Dale Carnegie
November 21	How to Stop Worrying and Start Living	Dale Carnegie
November 28	How to Stop Worrying and Start Living	Dale Carnegie
December 5	How to Stop Worrying and Start Living	Dale Carnegie
December 12	How to Stop Worrying and Start Living	Dale Carnegie
December 19	Roosevelt and Hopkins	Robert E. Sherwood
December 26	Crusade in Europe	Dwight D. Eisenhower

== See also ==
- Publishers Weekly list of bestselling novels in the United States in the 1940s
