= Raintree County =

Raintree County may refer to:

- Raintree County (novel), a 1948 novel by Ross Lockridge, Jr.
- Raintree County (film), a 1957 film starring Montgomery Clift and Elizabeth Taylor, based on the novel
