= Lincoln the Unknown =

1932 biography by Dale Carnegie

- First edition
- Author: Dale Carnegie
- Cover artist: K. S. Woerner
- Language: English
- Release number: 1932
- Subject: Abraham Lincoln
- Publisher: The Century Company
- Publication place: United States
- Pages: 256
- Preceded by: Public Speaking and Influencing Men in Business
- Followed by: Little Known Facts About Well Known People

Lincoln the Unknown is a biography of Abraham Lincoln, written in 1932 by Dale Carnegie. It is published by Dale Carnegie and Associates, and given out as a prize in the Dale Carnegie Course.

== Summary ==
Abraham Lincoln, a farm boy, becomes the President of the United States. He travels miles to borrow books; reading being the dominant passion of his for quarter of a century. He mourns the loss of his first love his whole life. He humors his colleagues in the White House, and lives with the difficulties of the marriage with his second love, while in war with the South.

== Inspirations and writing process ==
Carnegie describes the genesis and progress of his book in his foreword: "How this book was written--and why." One spring day, Dale Carnegie was breakfasting at a hotel in London. He came across a column in the Morning Post newspaper entitled "Men and Memories". On that particular morning and for several mornings following, that column was devoted to Abraham Lincoln—the personal side of his career. Carnegie read those with profound interest, and surprise. He had always been interested in the United States history. Aroused by the articles in the Morning Post, Carnegie went over to the British Museum Library and read a number of Lincoln books; the more he read, the more fascinated he became. Finally he determined to write a book on Lincoln, himself.

Carnegie began the work in Europe, and labored over it for a year there, and then for two years in New York. Finally he tore up all that he had written and tossed it into a waste-basket. He then went to Illinois, to write of Lincoln on the very ground where Lincoln himself had dreamed and toiled. For months he lived among people whose fathers had helped Lincoln survey land, build fences and drive hogs to market. For months he delved among old books, letters, speeches, half-forgotten newspapers and musty court records, trying to understand Lincoln.

Carnegie spent one summer in the little town of Petersburg. He went there because it is only a mile away from the restored village of New Salem, where Lincoln spent the happiest and most formative years of his life. The same white oaks under which Lincoln studied, wrestled and made love were still standing. Every morning Carnegie used to take his typewriter and motor up there from Petersburg, and wrote half of the chapters of his book under those trees. He often used to go alone to the woods along the banks of the Sangamon, on summer nights, realizing that on such nights Lincoln and Ann Rutledge, his first love, had walked over this same ground.

When Carnegie came to writing the chapter dealing with the death of Rutledge, he drove over the country roads to the quiet, secluded spot where she lay buried. It was abandoned and overgrown, so to get near her grave, he had to mow down weeds, brush and vines. Carnegie also wrote many of the chapters in Springfield. Some in the sitting-room of the old home where Lincoln lived, some at the desk where he composed his first inaugural address, and others above the spot where he came to court and quarrel with Mary Todd Lincoln.

== Anthropodermic bibliopegy ==
A portion of the binding in the copy of Dale Carnegie's Lincoln the Unknown, which is part of Temple University's Charles L. Blockson Collection, was made "from the skin of a Negro at a Baltimore Hospital and tanned by the Jewell Belting Company". This makes Lincoln the Unknown an example of anthropodermic bibliopegy.

== Reception ==
Dixon Ryan Fox, Lowell Thomas, and Homer Croy all wrote jacket copy for the original edition.

== General and cited references ==
- Carnegie, Dale (1932). Lincoln the Unknown. Cedar Books.
