= Raintree County (film) =

1957 film by Edward Dmytryk

- Theatrical poster
- Directed by: Edward Dmytryk
- Screenplay by: Millard Kaufman
- Based on: Raintree County by Ross Lockridge Jr.
- Produced by: David Lewis
- Starring: Montgomery Clift; Elizabeth Taylor; Eva Marie Saint; Nigel Patrick; Lee Marvin; Rod Taylor; Agnes Moorehead; Walter Abel; Jarma Lewis; Tom Drake
- Cinematography: Robert Surtees
- Edited by: John Dunning
- Music by: Johnny Green
- Distributed by: Metro-Goldwyn-Mayer
- Release date: October 2, 1957
- Running time: 186 minutes (Santa Barbara preview & Louisville premiere); 182 minutes (Roadshow release); 172 minutes (restored roadshow VHS); 159 - 165 minutes (general release)
- Country: United States
- Language: English
- Budget: $5,474,000
- Box office: $9,080,000

Raintree County is a 1957 American epic historical romance western war film adapted from the 1948 novel of the same name by Ross Lockridge Jr. The film was directed by Edward Dmytryk and distributed by Metro-Goldwyn-Mayer. Set in both the American Midwest and the American South against the backdrop of the Antebellum South and the American Civil War, the film tells the story of a small-town Midwestern teacher and poet named John Shawnessy, who meets and marries a beautiful Southern belle named Susanna Drake; however, her emotional instability leads to the destruction of their marriage. The leading roles are played by Montgomery Clift, Elizabeth Taylor, Eva Marie Saint, Nigel Patrick and Lee Marvin.

In July 1947, Metro-Goldwyn-Mayer had purchased the film rights of Ross Lockridge Jr.'s unpublished manuscript for Raintree County for $150,000. Carey Wilson was immediately signed as producer, and prominent actors were considered for leading roles. In January 1948, the book was released and became a national bestseller. In the following year, filming was delayed for two years as the project had grown too expensive. In 1955, the project was revived with Taylor and Clift signed for the two leading roles. Filming began in April 1956 and wrapped in October 1956. It would also mark the first use of a 65-millimeter widescreen process originally called MGM Camera 65.

Raintree County had its world premiere at the Brown Theatre in Louisville, Kentucky on October 2, 1957. In December 1957, the film was given a wide release in the United States, where it received negative reviews from film critics, who praised the production values and the performances of Clift and Taylor, but were critical of the film's plot. The film was nominated for four Academy Awards for Best Actress (Taylor), Art Direction–Set Decoration, Best Costume Design, and Best Score.

== Plot ==
In 1859, idealist John Wickliff Shawnessey is living in Raintree County, Indiana. He's fascinated by the legend of the county's magnificent raintree, and at one point, he ventures into the large, dangerous swamp where he believes it can be found. His quest is unsuccessful, and he almost dies in the effort.

Shawnessey has a college sweetheart, Nell Gaither, but he's soon distracted by Susanna Drake, a rich New Orleans Southern belle. He has a brief and passionate affair with Susanna while she is visiting his community. Following her return to the South, she returns to Indiana to tell Shawnessey she is pregnant with his child. John marries her out of honor and duty, leaving Nell heartbroken.

They travel south to visit Susanna's family. He learns that Susanna's mother went insane and died in a suspicious fire, along with Susanna's father and Henrietta, a slave implied to be the father's concubine. Susanna suspects that Henrietta may have been her biological mother. Gradually, Susanna appears to be suffering from mental illness. She tells John that she faked pregnancy to trick him into marriage.

As an abolitionist in the antebellum South, Shawnessey does not fit in with Susanna's family, and they return to Raintree County before the outbreak of the Civil War. John works as a teacher and they have a child, Jimmy, born at the outbreak of the war. In the war's third year, Susanna develops severe paranoia and delusions. She flees Indiana with Jimmy and seeks refuge among her extended family in Georgia.

Shawnessey is determined to find her and recover his son. He enlists in the Union Army in hopes of encountering his wife and child. After fighting in numerous battles in the Western Theater of the war, he finds Jimmy at an old plantation and learns that Susanna has been placed in an insane asylum. He is wounded while carrying Jimmy back to the Northern lines and is discharged from the Union Army. Johnny searches for Susanna, finding her kept in terrible conditions at the asylum. He brings her back with him to Raintree County.

After the end of the war and President Abraham Lincoln's assassination, Shawnessey considers his future. Nell urges him to run for political office. Recognizing that Nell and John still love each other, Susanna sacrifices herself and deludedly enters the swamp in the middle of the night to find the legendary raintree. Four-year-old Jimmy follows her. The search party eventually finds her body. John and Nell find Jimmy alive and carry him out of the swamp. Focused on the child, the two fail to notice the tall, spectacular raintree glowing in the early morning sunlight.

== Cast ==
- Montgomery Clift as John Wickliff Shawnessey
- Elizabeth Taylor as Susanna Drake
- Eva Marie Saint as Nell Gaither
- Nigel Patrick as Prof. Jerusalem Webster Stiles
- Lee Marvin as Orville 'Flash' Perkins
- Rod Taylor as Garwood B. Jones
- Agnes Moorehead as Ellen Shawnessy
- Walter Abel as T.D. Shawnessy
- Jarma Lewis as Barbara Drake
- Tom Drake as Bobby Drake
- Rhys Williams as Ezra Gray
- Russell Collins as Niles Foster
- Isabel Cooley as Soona
- DeForest Kelley as Southern officer
- Myrna Hansen as Lydia Grey

== Production ==
=== Development ===
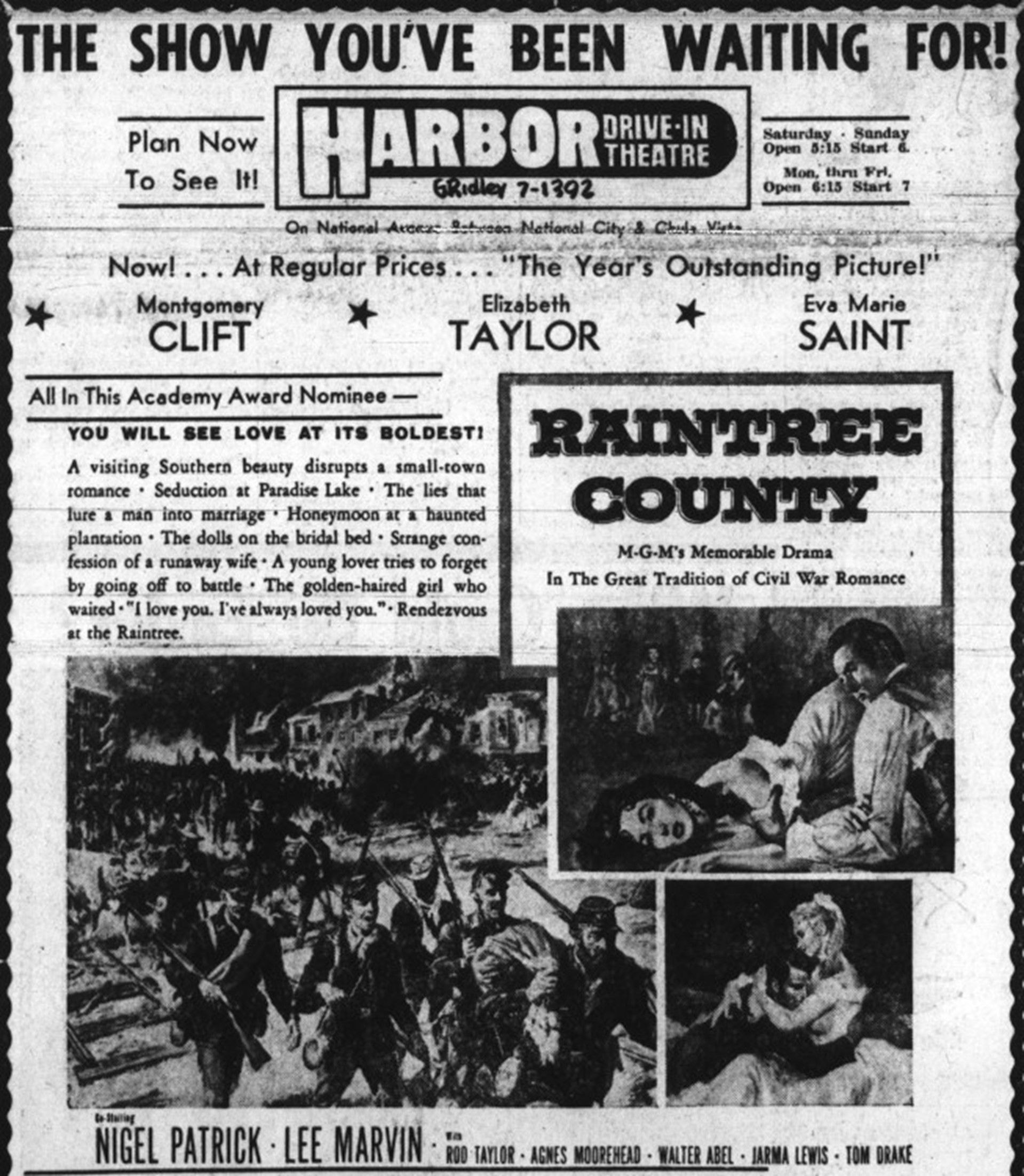
Drive-in advertisement from 1958.

On July 15, 1947, Metro-Goldwyn-Mayer had awarded first-time author Ross Lockridge Jr. a $150,000 prize for his novel, Raintree County, which was to be published by Houghton Mifflin. Two days later, the studio had purchased the film rights for $150,000. With a preliminary budget of $6 million, screenwriter Carey Wilson had been signed as the producer. He stated he had Lana Turner, Ava Gardner, and Janet Leigh in mind for the female roles while Robert Walker and Keenan Wynn were being considered for the leading male roles. On the studio's shortlist, Van Heflin and Gene Kelly were also being considered. Less than a year later, in March 1948, Lockridge Jr. was found dead inside his garage. His death was ruled a suicide from carbon monoxide poisoning. It was also reported that he had been working with the studio on the film adaptation. However, in August 1949, Wilson wrote a letter addressed to Lockridge's widow that the project had been delayed for two years. He wrote, "The book, to be filmed as I want it filmed and as the quality of the writing demands it be filmed, will cost more than $6,000,000 and the situation today does not permit such an expenditure."

In August 1955, the project was revived by MGM production head executive Dore Schary with David Lewis hired as producer. Lewis said he is the one who suggested the project to Schary, and suggested the film version focus on the story of Susannah; Schary agreed.

Elizabeth Taylor was cast as Susannah Drake and Millard Kaufman was hired to write the script. Lewis claimed MGM fought the casting of Taylor as "They felt that she was neither a good actress nor a potential box office star."

In December of the same year, Montgomery Clift had signed a three-picture deal with Metro-Goldwyn-Mayer with Raintree County to be filmed first. By January 1956, Eva Marie Saint had been offered $100,000 (~$881,180 in 2024) to co-star in Raintree County. Rod Taylor actively campaigned for his role in the film.

Lewis wrote the choice of director was between George Sidney and Edward Dmytryk, and he chose the latter "as the lesser of two evils. I had wanted Fred Zinnemann and he had liked the script. In fact, he had convinced Clift that he should do it [the film], but he refused to shoot it on the MGM lot with their production department; many of the better directors were refusing to work at MGM by this time. But it was essential to have the film shot on the lot — nothing else was scheduled for the months ahead and something had to be working in order to absorb all the overhead."

Screenwriter Millard Kaufman said he was "very taken with" the novel. "It was very complicated in terms of literary form. It was complex and turned on itself in a number of ways which at that time which was unusual." Kaufman said later however that he felt "I included too much of the novel" in the screenplay and "I went on too many tangents."

=== Filming ===
Raintree County was shot at various locations, including Dunleith and Elms Court antebellum mansions, Windsor Ruins, in Natchez, Mississippi; Reelfoot Lake in northwest Tennessee near the Kentucky border; and two locations in Kentucky, the Liberty Hall Historic Site on Wilkinson Street in Frankfort and settings in and near Danville. The Reelfoot Lake locations were used for the swamp scenes.

During filming, Montgomery Clift was injured and nearly killed in a serious automobile accident. On the evening of May 12, 1956, feeling tired and suffering from a hangover, he drove into a telephone pole and wrecked his car. He broke his nose, cut his lip, and fractured his jaw in three places, which had to be wired back together by surgery. As a result, the studio announced that production had been shut down for two to three weeks. At the time, the filming crew had moved to do two months of location shooting throughout most of the Deep South. A week later, after Clift had been discharged from the hospital, filming was further delayed until early July. The studio believed he (Clift) would be able to return to work within three weeks. Although he spent weeks in surgery and recovery, he returned to finish the film. The physical damage to his face was apparent in several scenes filmed after the accident; the left side of his face was partially paralyzed. His performance in the scenes shot after the accident was also markedly different from those shot before; he began to drink heavily and take a concoction of drugs which made his face more haggard and gave his eyes a furtive look, and affected his attitude and posture.

Edward Dmytryk later revealed in his autobiography It's a Hell of a Life but Not a Bad Living that he found "a hundred containers" of every kind of drug and "a beautiful leather case fitted with needles and syringes" in Clift's hotel room and once found him so drunk that his cigarette had burned itself out between his fingers. During filming in Danville, Clift's behavior grew increasingly erratic and bizarre, ordering his steak "blue-rare" (nearly uncooked) and adding masses of butter and pepper and eating it with his fingers, and running naked through the town, which resulted in a policeman being stationed outside his hotel room door to prevent his leaving during the night.

Kaufman said the director "shot the script as it was. Most of these crazy bastards won’t to that. Unfortunately it would have been better if he hadn’t.” The writer called David Lewis "a very nice rather inept man.”

Elizabeth Taylor had problems during the production with her period clothing, and on one occasion she collapsed from hyperventilation and was treated with Clift's bottle of Demerol and a syringe, delivered by the doctor. She took over a week to also recover from tachycardia following the incident. On set she was often late for filming and preoccupied with her romance with Mike Todd, who hired a commercial airliner to personally deliver some expensive presents to her in Danville.

The "Raintree" isn't actually a Rain tree or Samanea saman: The literary source: In the original novel by Ross Lockridge Jr., the legend refers to the Goldenrain tree (Koelreuteria paniculata). This tree sheds its bright yellow petals in the summer, creating the illusion of golden rain. However, this species only grows to about 10 to 15 meters tall and doesn't appear as monumental as the giant tree in the film. The tree in the swamp (in the film finale): The scene at the end of the film was shot in the real swamps of Reelfoot Lake in Lake County, Tennessee. The huge, gnarled tree is a Bald cypress (Taxodium distichum), which is typical of these swampy landscapes. To create the magical effect of "golden rain," the film crew artificially decorated the tree with golden leaves and blossoms.

Raintree County was the first film shot in a 65-millimeter anamorphic widescreen process originally called MGM Camera 65, later renamed Ultra Panavision 70, which yielded an extra-wide image of 2.76:1; it was also used for MGM's 1959 version of Ben Hur. Although MGM expected to release the film in 70mm, the studio ultimately opted not to. The only projectors at the time were being used to screen Mike Todd's Around the World in 80 Days. Due to the major delays in filming due to the issues with Clift and Taylor and the extravagant sets, the film was the most expensive US-based film in MGM's history, and Dmytryk never directed for MGM again. Though a success at the box office, it did not recoup its cost.

== Release ==
On January 24, 1957, Dmytryk, Lewis, Joseph Vogel, and numerous studio executives drove out to Santa Barbara, California to preview the film at the Granada Theater. The film ran for three hours and six minutes, and it had reportedly received a favorable response from an audience of 1,100 spectators. However, by March 1957, following numerous previews, MGM announced that reshoots would begin that same month so "that certain dramatic points will be emphasized by re-shooting in close-up and that extra footage will be added to achieve smoother transitions in the sprawling drama."

About 5,000 attendees arrived in Louisville, Kentucky for the film's world premiere at the Brown Theatre on October 2, 1957. It was the climax of two days of festivities which included a parade of limousines featuring stars from the film, receptions, and a costume ball held at the Freedom Hall Coliseum. The next month, it was reported that fifteen minutes would be cut from the film for its general release. For the film's wide release, Panavision president Robert Gottschalk stated Raintree County would be released in certain theaters on large-format 70mm film prints for roadshow theatrical engagements and on standard 35mm film prints.

== Reception ==
=== Critical reaction ===
Bosley Crowther of The New York Times wrote "It has a beautiful, costly production that is projected onto the screen in a sharp photographic process called Camera 65. It has a fancy cast of performers, headed by Elizabeth Taylor, Montgomery Clift, Eva Marie Saint and Nigel Patrick. And it has a busy musical score by Johnny Green. But Millard Kaufman's screenplay is a formless amoeba of a thing, and therein lies the fatal weakness of this costly, ambitious film."

Harrison's Reports felt "The picture is, in fact, so verbose that one loses its drift of the story unless he pays close attention to the dialogue. One of the shortcomings in the story is the fact that the motivations of some of the characters, particularly the hero, are not too clear, making for a vagueness that diminishes its dramatic impact...The acting of the entire cast is first-rate, and there are numerous scenes that are most effective dramatically, but on the whole the story falls short of the production's impressive visual beauty."

Similarly, Variety described the film as "a big picture in terms of pictorial size but the story doesn't always match the scope of the production. Chief story fault lies in its vagueness—the not truly specified motivations of the principals and in the conflicts involved in Clift's search for happiness alternately with Miss Saint and Miss Taylor."

Among more recent reviews, Geoff Andrew of Time Out called the film an "elephantine bore". Pauline Kael was not enthusiastic: "A full-scale mess ... the script is so literary and chaotic it seems demented ... this is the kind of movie in which a heavenly choir is heard while Taylor and Clift talk about the legendary magical rain tree."

On the review aggregate website Rotten Tomatoes, the film has an approval rating of 10% based on 10 reviews with an average rating of 5.20/10.

=== Box office ===
According to Lewis, "the film opened in a few spots, but business was not good. Everyone at M-G-M began denying anything to do with it, but when it opened soon after in its general run, the business was enormous. Then the stampede began to grab credit." He wrote studio executive Eddie Mannix "was amused with the whole situationand had a good laugh with me. He was still the only one at MGM who had purpose, ability, and human understanding."

In January 1959 Variety estimated the film would make $6 million in North America. According to MGM records, the film earned $5,830,000 in North America and $3,250,000 internationally. However, because of its high cost, the movie recorded a loss of $484,000.

== Awards and honors ==
Award	Category	Nominee(s)	Result
Academy Awards	Best Actress	Elizabeth Taylor	Nominated
Academy Awards	Best Production Design	Art Direction: William A. Horning and Urie McCleary; Set Decoration: Edwin B. Willis and Hugh Hunt	Nominated
Academy Awards	Best Costume Design	Walter Plunkett	Nominated
Academy Awards	Best Original Score	Johnny Green	Nominated
Golden Globe Awards	Best Supporting Actor – Motion Picture	Nigel Patrick	Nominated
Laurel Awards	Top Female Dramatic Performance	Elizabeth Taylor	Nominated
Laurel Awards	Top Male Supporting Performance	Lee Marvin	5th Place
Laurel Awards	Top Female Supporting Performance	Agnes Moorehead	Nominated
Laurel Awards	Top Music Composer	Johnny Green	Nominated

The film is recognized by American Film Institute in these lists:

- 2002: AFI's 100 Years...100 Passions – Nominated
- 2005: AFI's 100 Years of Film Scores – Nominated

== See also ==
- List of American films of 1957

== Notes ==
- Lewis, David (1993). Curtis, James (ed.). The Creative Producer. Metuchen: Scarecrow Press. ISBN 0-8108-2720-4.
