= Public Speaking and Influencing Men in Business =

Book by Dale Carnegie

Public Speaking and Influencing Men In Business
- Title page for Public Speaking and Influencing Men In Business (1937)
- Author: Dale Carnegie
- Language: English
- Subject: Public speaking, self-improvement
- Publication date: 1937 (original), 1956, 1962, 2005 (revised editions)
- Media type: Print
- ISBN: 0-7661-6973-1
- Preceded by: Public Speaking: a Practical Course for Business Men (1926)
- Followed by: How to Develop Self-Confidence and Influence People by Public Speaking (1956), The Quick and Easy Way to Effective Speaking (1962), Public Speaking for Success (2005)

Public Speaking and Influencing Men In Business (ISBN 0-7661-6973-1) is a 1937 revision of Dale Carnegie's 1926 book Public Speaking: a Practical Course for Business Men. Dorothy Carnegie produced 2 separate revised editions: How to Develop Self-Confidence and Influence People by Public Speaking (1956), aimed at the general public, and The Quick and Easy Way to Effective Speaking (1962), as a replacement textbook for the Dale Carnegie Course. A more recent revised edition is Public Speaking for Success (2005), revised by Arthur Pell, which restores content that was left out of the Dorothy Carnegie-revised works.

Public Speaking: a Practical Course for Business Men, Public Speaking and Influencing Men In Business, and The Quick and Easy Way to Effective Speaking served as standard textbooks in the Dale Carnegie Course.

The main focus of this book is to present a thorough understanding of the principles of public speaking, as well as guidance into conquering the fears attributed to public speaking.

== Contents ==
1. Developing Courage and Self Confidence
2. Self-Confidence thru Preparation
3. How Famous Speakers Prepared Their Addresses
4. The Improvement of Memory
5. Keeping the Audience Awake
6. Essential Elements in Successful Speaking
7. The Secret of Good Delivery
8. Platform Presence and Personality
9. How to Open a Talk
10. Capturing Your Audience at Once
11. How to Close a Talk
12. How to Make your Meaning Clear
13. How to Be Impressive and Convincing
14. How to Interest your Audience
15. How to Get Action
16. Improving your Diction

== Appendices ==
- Acres of Diamond by Russell Conwell
- A Message to Garcia by Elbert Hubbard
- As a Man Thinketh by James Allen
