= John Leggett =

American writer

- Born: John Ward Leggett; November 11, 1917; Manhattan, New York City, New York, United States
- Died: January 25, 2015 (aged 97); Napa, California, United States
- Education: Yale University
- Spouses: Mary Lee Fahnestock (div); Edwina Benington
- Children: 7 (3 biological, 4 stepchildren)

John Ward Leggett (November 11, 1917 – January 25, 2015) was an American writer who served as the third director of the Iowa Writers' Workshop from 1970 to 1987.

== Biography ==
Leggett was born in Manhattan to Bleecker Noel Leggett, a real estate manager, and Dorothy Mahar (or Mahan). She died the following year during the 1918 influenza pandemic, and Leggett was raised by his grandmother. Leggett attended the Manlius School in Syracuse, but left for Bard College before graduating. He finished high school at Phillips Academy of Andover, Massachusetts, then attended Yale University. Upon his graduation with a degree in drama in 1942, he served as a United States Navy lieutenant in the Pacific Theater.

After the end of World War II, Leggett collected "a fat swatch of rejection slips" until in 1950 he was offered a job at Houghton Mifflin in Boston, where he worked for 10 years as an editor and publicity director, then for seven years as editor at Harper and Rowe in New York.

In 1967, Leggett wrote a non-fiction book, which became Ross & Tom: Two American Tragedies. He joined the English department of the University of Iowa in 1969, and was named the director of the Writers' Workshop in 1970. During his tenure, writers such as Allan Gurganus, Richard Bausch, T.C. Boyle, Ethan Canin, Michael Cunningham, Gail Godwin, Denis Johnson, and Jane Smiley came to the workshop as students. Writers he attracted as faculty include Stanley Elkin, John Cheever, Ian McEwan, Raymond Carver, Jorie Graham, Frederick Exley, Gail Godwin, Barry Hannah, James Alan McPherson, John Irving, and Frank Conroy, who became his successor.

Leggett retired in 1987, moved to Napa and helped run the Napa Valley Writers’ Conference, established in 1981 by Dave Evans of Napa Valley College. Leggett died of pneumonia at Queen of the Valley Medical Center in Napa, California on January 25, 2015.

== Personal ==
Leggett married Mary Lee Fahnestock in 1947. They had three sons, Timothy, John, and Anthony, and divorced in 1986. Leggett moved to Napa, California in 1987 and later married Edwina Bennington of San Francisco, with whom he lived until his death.

== Books ==
- Wilder Stone (1960) Harper & Brothers, about the relationship with his father.
- The Gloucester Branch (1964) Harper & Row
- Who Took the Gold Away (1969) Random House, about mismatched college friends, Leggett's time at Yale.
- Ross and Tom: Two American Tragedies (1974) Simon & Schuster
- Gulliver House (1979) Houghton Mifflin—about the publishing industry.
- Making Believe (1986) Houghton Mifflin
- A Daring Young Man: A Biography of William Saroyan (2002) Knopf, a biography of two young novelists of the late 1940s, Thomas Heggen and Ross Lockridge Jr., who both committed suicide. Leggett’s notes and research were published in 2003 as an addendum to the book.
