= Joe Caroff =

American graphic designer (1921–2025)

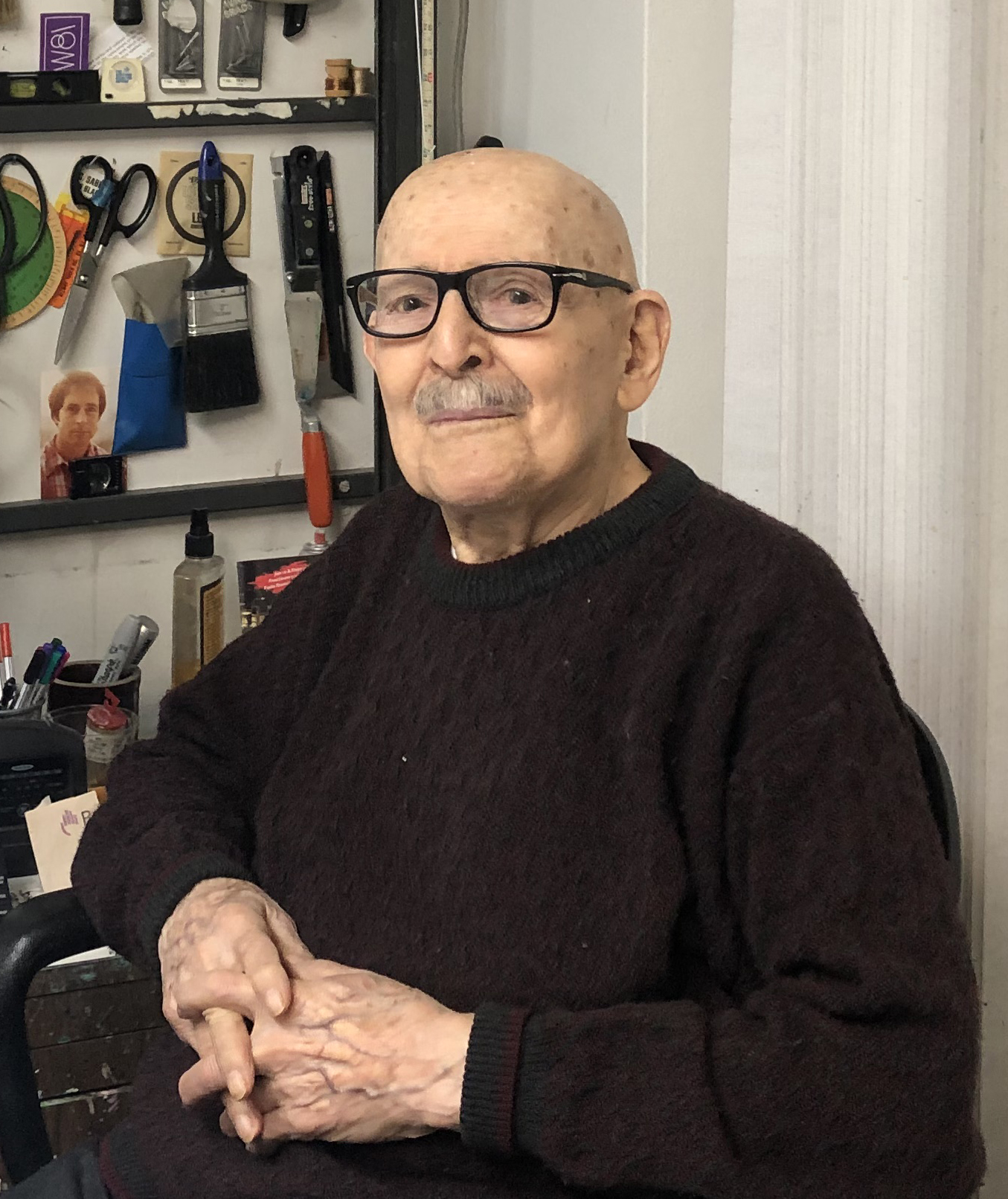
- Caroff in 2021
- Born: August 18, 1921; Roselle, New Jersey, U.S.
- Died: August 17, 2025 (aged 103); New York City, U.S.
- Education: Pratt Institute
- Occupation: Graphic designer
- Spouse: Phyllis Friedman (m. 1943; died 2025)
- Children: 2

Joseph Caroff (August 18, 1921 – August 17, 2025) was an American graphic designer known for film posters and corporate logos. He created the 007 pistol logo for the James Bond movie franchise and the poster design for the movie West Side Story. Caroff and the design agency he ran under his name were involved with over 300 other films, as well as product branding and company logos.

== Background ==
Caroff was born on August 18, 1921, in Roselle, New Jersey, to Jewish immigrant parents from Babruysk (present-day Belarus). His father, Julius Caroff, was a painter, while his mother, Fanny Caroff (née Sack) was a housewife. After graduating from high school, Caroff studied at the Pratt Institute in Brooklyn until 1942. While still a student, he worked as an assistant in the Manhattan studio of French poster designer Jean Carlu. Shortly after finishing his studies, Caroff was drafted for service in the U.S. Army and stationed in Molesworth, Cambridgeshire, England, where he designed airborne leaflet propaganda as part of the United States Office of War Information.

After returning to New York from active duty, Caroff was employed at Alan Berni Associates, then worked freelance for publishing, packaging, and film production projects. In 1965, he founded the agency J. Caroff Associates, Inc. In 1986, he partnered with Lon Kirschner to form the agency Kirschner Caroff. In 2006, at the age of 85, Caroff ended his graphic design career and dedicated himself to paintings and drawings which were presented at art exhibitions. Joe Caroff and his wife Phyllis lived in New York City, where they sponsored the Phyllis and Joseph Caroff Foundation for Health and Mental Health funding need based scholarships for students attending Hunter College School of Social Work.

In 2021, German designer Thilo von Debschitz managed to contact the mostly forgotten Caroff. After several interviews, Debschitz published an eight-page article in the German Grafikmagazin in August 2021 (the month of Caroff's 100th birthday) and a six-page article in the British design magazine Eye in December 2021. In the articles, Debschitz looked back on Caroff's life and work.

In October 2022, the documentary By Design: The Joe Caroff Story, directed by former HBO producer Mark Cerulli and produced by Cerulli and Paul C. Rosen, was released on U.S. television. On November 14, Film Forum, a well-known cinema dedicated to independent movies, held a special screening in New York City that was attended by the filmmakers and Caroff himself.

Caroff lived in Manhattan, New York. He and his wife, art professor Phyllis (née Friedman) Caroff, were married for 81 years, until her death in February 2025, and had two sons. Caroff died in hospice care on August 17, 2025, one day before his 104th birthday.

== Works ==
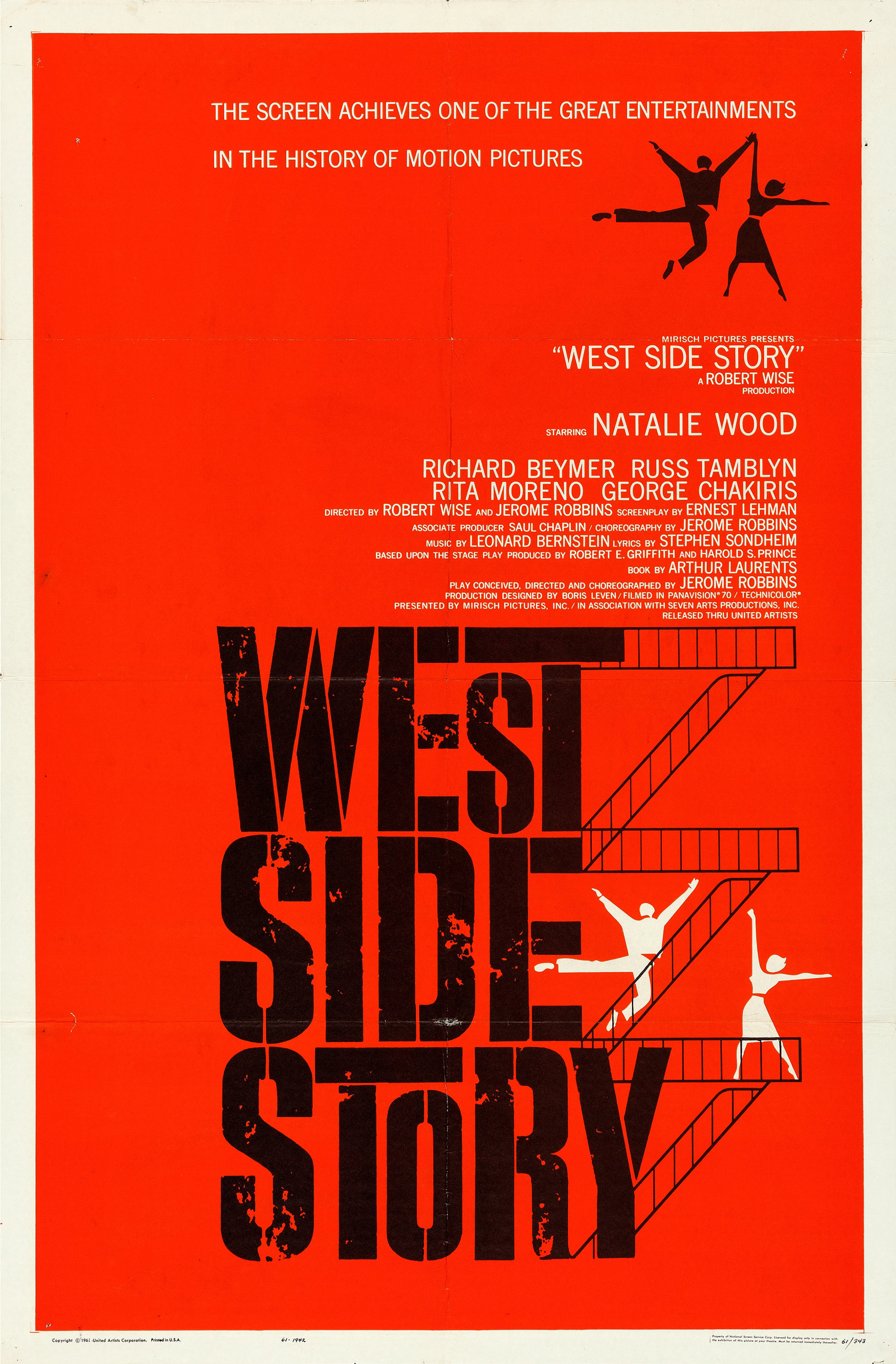
West Side Story (1961) movie poster

At the age of 27, spelling his name Joseph Karov, he created the book jacket for Norman Mailer's first novel, The Naked and the Dead. The design was exhibited at the Book Jacket Designers Guild Exhibition (1948) as well as at the 28th Annual Exhibition of Advertising and Editorial Art by the Art Director's Club of New York and at the exhibition Modern Art in Your Life at the Museum of Modern Art (1949).

Caroff designed the poster for the movie version of West Side Story (1961), often wrongly credited to Saul Bass (who did design the film's animated title sequence that inspired the poster). For the launch of the James Bond movie franchise in 1962, Caroff conceptualized the digits 007 integrated with a pistol, which became the signature of the brand and remains in use. Some of the work his agency J. Caroff Associates created were posters and lettering for over 300 movies including Cabaret, Last Tango in Paris, and Zelig. In addition, Caroff designed animated title sequences for films including The Last Temptation of Christ and the 1985 Death of a Salesman. Other work conceived by Caroff's associates at the studio include Burt Kleeger's lettering and posters for the Woody Allen comedies Manhattan and Stardust Memories.

Besides film posters, Caroff created product and company logos, including for the TV broadcasting station Fox and for ABC Olympics (a sports reporting subbrand of the broadcasting service ABC). The last-mentioned project led to a lawsuit between ABC and a sculptor who had come up with a similar formal idiom. Handdrawn lettering by Caroff inspired designers in the development of complete typefaces. In 2008, British type designer Jonathan Hill created the typeface Laser Disco based on Caroff's lettering for the movie Rollerball. In 1975, British type designer Colin Brignall created the font Tango based on Caroff's lettering for Last Tango in Paris.
