= Ross Lockridge Jr. =

American novelist (1914–1948)

- Born: Ross Franklin Lockridge Jr. April 25, 1914; Bloomington, Indiana, U.S.
- Died: March 6, 1948 (aged 33); Bloomington, Indiana, U.S.
- Education: Indiana University Bloomington
- Occupation: Novelist
- Writing career
- Period: 1948
- Genre: Historical fiction
- Notable work: Raintree County
- Website: raintreecounty.com

Ross Franklin Lockridge Jr. (April 25, 1914 – March 6, 1948) was an American writer known for his novel Raintree County (1948). The novel became a bestseller and has been praised by readers and critics alike. Some have considered it a "Great American Novel". Lockridge died by suicide at the peak of his novel's success at age 33.

== Early years ==
Ross Franklin Lockridge Jr. was born and raised in Bloomington, Indiana, the youngest of four children of Elsie Shockley and Ross Lockridge Sr., a populist historian, and lecturer. Through his father, he was a double cousin of the novelist Mary Jane Ward.

Lockridge graduated from Bloomington High School in 1931 and Indiana University Bloomington in 1935. He was known as "A-plus Lockridge" and graduated with the highest average in the history of the university at the time, despite having earned an unaccustomed B during two semesters at the Sorbonne in Paris. The year abroad had made a great impression on Lockridge, not least in setting his standard for future success, and he instructed himself to "write the greatest single piece of literature ever composed."

Following his graduation, Lockridge came down with either scarlet or rheumatic fever and was sick for nearly a year. In 1936, he returned to the university as an English instructor and M.A. candidate, writing his thesis on "Byron and Napoleon." Lockridge married Vernice Baker in this year, and together they had their first child.

In September 1940, Lockridge accepted a fellowship at Harvard University, and the family moved to Cambridge, Massachusetts. While working toward earning a Ph.D. in English, Lockridge also was writing what was characterized as an "unreadable 400-page poem." Entitled The Dream of the Flesh of Iron, the work was submitted to and then rejected by the Boston publisher Houghton Mifflin in 1941. Around this time Lockridge was teaching at Boston's Simmons College while ostensibly working on a dissertation about Walt Whitman. Instead, he wrote 2,000 pages of a novel with the working title American Lives, based on his mother's family, the Shockleys.

== Raintree County ==
=== Genesis of the novel ===
In the summer of 1943, Lockridge turned those pages over and began to type on the other side. The new novel was similarly based, though moved back one generation and focusing on a single day—July 4, 1892—in what may have been an emulation of James Joyce's Ulysses. Instead of treating several Shockleys, it would have a single hero, John Wickliff Shawnessy, who bore the same initials as his maternal grandfather. The rest of the sprawling story would be told in flashbacks and in a long, concluding dream sequence. As before, it would be set in Indiana, in what any good Hoosier understood to be the heartland of the United States. The Civil War would be its defining event, as it had been for the country, and for the poet, Lockridge had selected it as the subject of his abandoned Ph.D. dissertation. He would, he said, "express the American myth—give shape to the lasting 'heroic' qualities of the American people." Indeed, he intended to do nothing less than "write the American republic," thus completing a trifecta of James Joyce, Walt Whitman—and Plato.

Though he was the father of three children, Lockridge was called for a pre-induction physical in February 1944. For the U.S. Army, this was a time of high manpower needs (the invasion of France was scheduled for the spring) and a much-depleted draft pool. He was classified 4-F—unfit for military service—when the doctors noticed an irregular heartbeat, probably resulting from his bout with scarlet fever. Meanwhile, his fictional hero was fighting in the Civil War. "For my part," he later said with mingled regret and chagrin, "while the Republic was bleeding, I hid behind a thousand skirts and let J.W.S. bleed for me all over the thousands of MS. pages of Raintree County.

"Lockridge was a Vesuvius," in the words of John Leggett. "When he was at work, twenty or thirty pages spewed from his typewriter each day, some on their way to the wastebasket, others to be revised, endlessly before they were satisfactory, but always expanding." Indeed, Ross claimed to type at up to 100 words per minute, an incredible feat on a manual typewriter. Toward the end, he worked in one room while Vernice typed the clean version in another room, with young Ernest carrying papers from one to the other. "[M]y father was Gatling-gunning Raintree County through the old Royal [typewriter]," Ernest later wrote.

Lockridge completed the 600,000-word typescript in April 1946. He put the novel's five sections into as many binders, put the binders into a suitcase, and splurged on a taxi to carry himself and his 20-pound package to the Houghton Mifflin offices at Two Park Street in Boston. Houghton Mifflin's first reader advised rejecting the novel, as the publisher had earlier done with The Dream of the Flesh of Iron, but the newly submitted work was reconsidered and accepted for publication. After the telephone call came, offering him an advance against royalties of $3500—more than a year's salary at Simmons—Lockridge asked for and was granted a leave of absence from his teaching duties.

Back in Bloomington, Lockridge became "more and more nervous" about the process of turning his huge book into a commercial product. The editors wanted him to trim it by 100,000 words, including the dream sequence that he regarded as central to the book. (Among the material to be jettisoned was a fantasy auction of the hero, who, in an echo of Lockridge's reaction to his draft status was advertised as "back from the wars without any hurts, after hiding behind a thousand skirts.") Lockridge and his wife, Vernice, therefore spent the rest of the year as before, "ceaselessly typing from morning to night." The task took until January 1947, meaning that Raintree County would not be published on schedule in April.

Lockridge returned to Boston for what he thought would be the final push. He was given an office at Houghton Mifflin, from which he advised the staff on the book's illustrations, typography, cover design, and even the design of the dust jacket, showing green hills in the shape of his recumbent heroine. Because the company planned to publish another potential best-seller that autumn, it pushed Raintree County back to January 1948. Adding to the author's excitement and stress, Metro-Goldwyn-Mayer Studios awarded him a $150,000 prize that, with escalators, had the potential of amounting to $350,000—the equivalent of more than $3.5 million today—but he would have to cut another 100,000 words from the book. In negotiations that went through the night, Lockridge and M-G-M compromised on a reduction of 50,000 words, which, as he said, "virtually killed me at the time and took all of the sweet out of the prize." To Houghton Mifflin, he confessed that "six and a half years of effort have played me out, and I'm not quite up to it physically." Nevertheless, he went to work, jettisoning one character and adding another.

The 450,000-word revision was finished in August, whereupon the Book of the Month Club offered to make it a main selection—but only if further cuts were made. Meanwhile, Lockridge and Houghton Mifflin argued about how the M-G-M award would be shared between them. At the same time, there were complicated negotiations about income averaging to lower tax rates on income from the book.

=== Publication ===
During the publication process, concerns expressed by the Book of the Month Club led to the production of two versions of Raintree County. As the book developed, Lockridge had created an alter ego for his hero, in the person of the outrageous "Perfessor" Jerusalem Webster Styles who delivers a blasphemous riff in praise of bastards, which included the three words, "Wasn't Jesus God's?" That the BOMC could not tolerate. The three words were duly removed, but only after 5,000 copies had already been printed. The first edition press run was an extraordinary 50,000 copies, bound in green cloth imprinted with a golden raintree. There were faux nineteenth-century wood engravings on the endpapers, and a frontispiece locating the town of Waycross and the Shawmucky River, its meandering course spelling out the initials JWS. This was all according to Lockridge's specifications. He also sketched the recumbent nude that was depicted on the dust jacket.

The book was released on January 4, 1948, and the entire press run was sold out by the official publication day, January 5. The reviews were as extravagant as the novel itself. The New York Times called Raintree County "a huge and extraordinary first novel ... an achievement of art and purpose, a cosmically brooding book full of significance and beauty." By contrast, The New Yorker was scathing, calling the book "the climax of all the swollen, pretentious human chronicles that also include a panorama of the Civil War, life in the corn-and-wheat belt, or what not ... just the sort of plump turkey that they bake to a turn in Hollywood...." (Compounding the pain to the author and the embarrassment to the magazine, the review referred to the book as "Raintree Country" and its author as "Lockwood.") Writing in Saturday Review, the distinguished critic Howard Mumford Jones struck an admiring middle ground: "Latest candidate for that mythical honor, the Great American Novel, 'Raintree County' displays unflagging industry, a jerky and sometimes magnificent vitality, a queer amalgam of pattern and formlessness, and an ingenuity of structure that is at once admirable and maddening...."

== Illness and death ==
Lockridge began to exhibit signs of mental illness in the fall of 1947. After Life magazine published a ribald excerpt of Raintree County on September 18, he confided to his wife that "I walk past people and I wonder what they think." And, more ominously, "Whatever made me think I could get away with it?"

Suffering from severe depression, Lockridge died by suicide from carbon monoxide poisoning on March 6, 1948, shortly after the book's publication. He left behind his wife, Vernice, and four young children. Lockridge is interred in Rose Hill Cemetery in Bloomington, Indiana.

== Raintree County (film) ==
In 1957, Hollywood's Metro-Goldwyn-Mayer (MGM) adapted Raintree County to the big screen. The movie, also titled Raintree County, featured Elizabeth Taylor, Montgomery Clift, and Eva Marie Saint. It received fair to good reviews and did moderately well at the box office, receiving four Academy Awards nominations, including one for Taylor.

== Bibliography ==
- Lockridge, Ernest. Skeleton Key to the Suicide of My Father, Ross Lockridge Jr., Kindle edition, 2011, loc. 1725, 1748. The first and second quotes are confirmed by reproductions from his father's journal.
- Leggett, John (1974). Ross and Tom: Two American Tragedies. New York: Simon and Schuster. ISBN 0-671-21733-X.
- Lockridge, Larry (1994). Shade of the Raintree: The Life and Death of Ross Lockridge Jr. New York: Viking Penguin. ISBN 0-670-85440-9.
- Lockridge, Ernest (2004). Travels with Ernest: Crossing the Literary/Sociological Divide. New York: Rowman & Littlefield. ISBN 0-7591-0596-0.
- Lockridge, Ernest (2011). Skeleton Key to the Suicide of My Father, Ross Lockridge Jr., author of Raintree County. Charleston: Global Enterprises. ISBN 978-1-4609-0976-8.
- Lockridge, Ernest (2019). The Suicide of Ross Lockridge, Jr. Worthington, Ohio: The South Street Press. ISBN 978-1-79311-117-3.
