= Dale Carnegie =

American writer and lecturer (1888–1955)

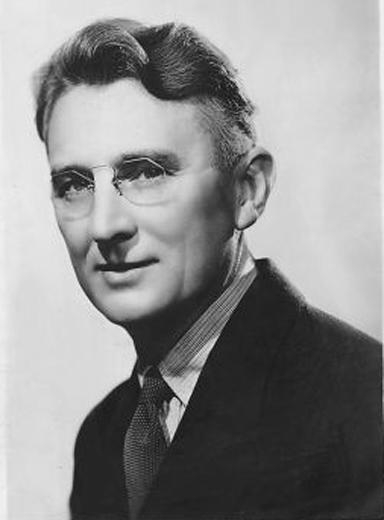
- Carnegie, c. 1937
- Born: Dale Harbison Carnagey; November 24, 1888; Maryville, Missouri, U.S.
- Died: November 1, 1955 (aged 66); Forest Hills, New York, U.S.
- Resting place: Belton, Missouri, U.S.
- Education: University of Central Missouri
- Occupations: Writer, teacher
- Spouses: Lolita Baucaire (m. 1927; div. 1931) Dorothy Price Vanderpool (m. 1944)
- Children: 2
- Writing career
- Notable works: How to Win Friends and Influence People; How to Stop Worrying and Start Living

Dale Carnegie (/ˈkɑːrnɪɡi/ KAR-nig-ee; spelled Carnagey until c. 1922; November 24, 1888 – November 1, 1955) was an American writer and teacher of courses in self-improvement, salesmanship, corporate training, public speaking, and interpersonal skills. Born into poverty on a farm in Missouri, he was the author of How to Win Friends and Influence People (1936), a bestseller that remains popular today. He also wrote How to Stop Worrying and Start Living (1948), Lincoln the Unknown (1932), and several other books.

One of the core ideas in his books is that it is possible to change other people's behavior by changing one's behavior towards them.

== Biography ==
Dale Carnegie was born November 24, 1888, on a farm in Maryville, Missouri. He was the second son of farmers Amanda Elizabeth Harbison (1858–1939) and James William Carnagey (1852–1941). Carnegie grew up around Bedison, Missouri, southeast of Maryville and attended rural Rose Hill and Harmony one room schools. Carnegie developed a longstanding friendship with another Maryville author, Homer Croy.

In 1904, at age 16, his family moved to a farm in Warrensburg, Missouri. As a youth, he enjoyed speaking in public and joined his school's debate team. Carnegie said he had to get up at 3 a.m. to feed the pigs and milk his parents' cows before going to school. During high school, he grew interested in the speeches at the various Chautauqua assemblies. He completed his high school education in 1906.

He attended the State Teachers College in Warrensburg, graduating in 1908.

His first job after college was selling correspondence courses to ranchers. He moved on to selling bacon, soap, and lard for Armour & Company. He was successful to the point of making his sales territory of South Omaha, Nebraska, the national leader for the firm.

After saving $200, Dale Carnegie quit sales in 1911 in order to pursue a lifelong dream of becoming a Chautauqua lecturer. He ended up instead attending the American Academy of Dramatic Arts in New York, but found little success as an actor, though it is written that he played the role of Dr. Hartley in a road show of Polly of the Circus. When the production ended, he returned to New York, living at the YMCA on 125th Street. There he got the idea to teach public speaking, and he persuaded the YMCA manager to allow him to instruct a class in return for 80% of the net proceeds. In his first session, he had run out of material. Improvising, he suggested that students speak about "something that made them angry", and discovered that the technique made speakers unafraid to address a public audience. From this 1912 debut, the Dale Carnegie Course evolved. Carnegie had tapped into the average American's desire to have more self-confidence, and by 1914, he was earning $500 (about $16,100 in 2025) every week.

During World War I he served in the U.S. Army spending the time at Camp Upton. His draft card noted he had filed for conscientious objector status and was missing a forefinger.

By 1916, Dale conducted a sold out lecture at Carnegie Hall. Some time later he changed his last name's spelling because—as he explained to fellow Missourians while visiting in the 1930s—"none of his friends or correspondents spelled it correctly and he didn't want to constantly correct them." Carnegie's first collection of his writings was Public Speaking: a Practical Course for Business Men (1926), later entitled Public Speaking and Influencing Men in Business (1932). In 1936, Simon & Schuster published How to Win Friends and Influence People. The book was a bestseller from its debut. By the time of Carnegie's death, the book had sold five million copies in 31 languages, and there had been 450,000 graduates of his Dale Carnegie Institute. It has been stated in the book that he had critiqued over 150,000 speeches in his participation in the adult education movement of the time.

== Personal life ==
His first marriage ended in divorce in August 1931.

On November 5, 1944, he married his former secretary, Dorothy Price Vanderpool (1912–1998), who also had been divorced. Vanderpool had a daughter, Rosemary, from her first marriage. She and Carnegie had a daughter, Donna Dale. Dorothy ran the Carnegie company following Dale's death.

Carnegie died of Hodgkin lymphoma on November 1, 1955, at his home in Forest Hills, New York. He was buried in the Belton cemetery in Cass County, Missouri.

== Books ==
- 1915: Art of Public Speaking, with Joseph Berg Esenwein.
- 1920: Public Speaking: the Standard Course of the United Y. M. C. A. Schools.
- 1926: Public Speaking: a Practical Course for Business Men. Later editions and updates changed the name of the book several times: Public Speaking and Influencing Men in Business (1937 revised), How to Develop Self-Confidence and Influence People by Public Speaking (1956) and Public Speaking for Success (2005).
- 1932: Lincoln the Unknown.
- 1934: Little Known Facts About Well Known People.
- 1936: How to Win Friends and Influence People.
- 1937: Five Minute Biographies.
- 1944: Dale Carnegie's Biographical round-up.
- 1948: How to Stop Worrying and Start Living.
- 1959: Dale Carnegie's Scrapbook: a Treasury of the Wisdom of the Ages. A selection of Dale Carnegie's writings edited by Dorothy Carnegie.
- 1962: The Quick and Easy Way to Effective Speaking. (by Dorothy Carnegie, based upon Dale Carnegie's own notes and ideas)

== Booklets ==
(most given out in Dale Carnegie Courses)

- 1938: How to Get Ahead in the World Today
- 1936: The Little Golden Book (later renamed The Golden Book, lists basics from HTWFIP and HTSWSL)
- 1946: How to Put Magic in the Magic Formula
- 1947: A Quick and Easy Way to Learn to Speak in Public. (later combined as Speak More Effectively, 1979)
- 1952: How to Make Our Listeners Like Us. (later combined as Speak More Effectively, 1979)
- 1959: How to Save Time and Get Better Results in Conferences (later renamed Meetings: Quicker & Better Results)
- 1960: How to Remember Names (later renamed as Remember Names)
- 1965: The Little Recognized Secret of Success (later renamed Live Enthusiastically)
- 1979: Apply Your Problem Solving Know How

== See also ==
- Carnegie (disambiguation)
- Chautauqua
- Self-help
