= The Naked and the Dead =

1948 novel by Norman Mailer

- Cover of the first edition
- Author: Norman Mailer
- Cover artist: Joe Caroff
- Language: English
- Publisher: Rinehart & Company
- Publication date: 1948
- Publication place: United States
- Media type: Print (hardcover)
- Pages: 721

The Naked and the Dead is a novel written by Norman Mailer. Published by Rinehart & Company in 1948, when he was 25, it was his debut novel. It depicts the experiences of a platoon during World War II, based partially on Mailer's experiences as a cook with the 112th Cavalry Regiment during the Philippines Campaign in World War II. The book quickly became a bestseller, paving the way for other Mailer works such as The Deer Park, Advertisements for Myself, and The Time of Our Time. He believed The Naked and the Dead to be his most renowned work. It was the first popular novel about the war and is considered one of the greatest English-language novels. It was adapted into a film in 1958.

In 1998, the Modern Library ranked The Naked and the Dead 51st on its list of the 100 best English-language novels of the 20th century.

== Plot ==
The story takes place on Anopopei, a fictional island in the South Pacific. American forces are faced with a campaign to drive out the Japanese so that Americans can advance into the Philippines. The novel focuses on one platoon.

Staff Sergeant Sam Croft, Woodrow Wilson, and Roy Gallagher are playing cards the night before a scheduled attack. They are members of a recon platoon fighting in the Asian theater of World War II on Anopopei. The next morning, as the platoon takes boats to the island, they are nervous. The assault begins, and as the platoon waits to come to the island, they nervously joke amongst themselves. Once the squad reaches the beach, they begin digging foxholes. Stanley picks a fight with Oscar Ridges and Red Valsen, but ultimately Red backs down. Croft leaves to find his commanding officer. Once they have begun to settle on the beach, the Japanese attack. The platoon splits up. Corporal Toglio, Hennessey, and Ridges have completed their foxholes, so they stay on the beach. Brown, Gallagher, Wilson, Red, Stanley, and Sergeant Julio Martinez run after Croft. As the beach is shelled, Hennessey is killed by shrapnel.

Later, Croft pleads with officers to give him more men to replace those lost. He ultimately earns a replacement, bringing the depleted platoon up to fourteen men out of an intended twenty. Roth and Goldstein, two of the new men in the platoon, bond over their Jewish heritage.

Lieutenant Robert Hearn snaps at other officers, and Major General Edward Cummings steps in. Hearn and Cummings form an odd friendship. The two talk in Cummings's tent at night. They discuss philosophy and Cummings analyzes Hearn’s personality. Cummings tells Hearn that, as an officer, he must develop resentment for enlisted men.

Roth and Minetta are separated from the rest of the squad, and when they hear gunfire, they assume recon must be in a firefight. As Roth keeps watch, he falls asleep at his post and wakes up Stanley a half-hour late. The next day, the other half of the platoon moves anti-tank guns, slowed down by the mud. Wyman drops his leg of the gun, and it rolls down a hill. When he tries to take responsibility, Croft thinks he is covering for Goldstein, whom he blames instead. Ironically, Goldstein comes to believe that he himself was responsible for the failure.

The entire platoon meets back up and are attacked by Japanese soldiers while sleeping. Croft is one of the men on watch when they attack, and he leads the platoon in repelling the Japanese, killing multiple Japanese soldiers. Toglio gets hit in the arm during the battle, meaning he will be discharged. The soldiers say he is lucky because his wound will not prevent him from doing anything once it heals, but he still gets to return to America. The Americans fend off the attack.

Cummings and Hearn continue their antagonistic relationship, and Cummings assigns Hearn to oversee the construction of a recreation tent for the officers. Hearn realizes he is feeling the resentment towards the enlisted men that Cummings predicted. While discussing war and philosophy and playing chess, the two realize they are not fond of each other.

Croft, Red, and Gallagher run into four Japanese soldiers in the forest, who do not notice them. Croft throws a grenade, killing three of the soldiers. Red goes to finish off the remaining soldier, but his gun jams. The soldier rushes Red with a bayonet. Croft comes out and stops the soldier, and the Japanese man surrenders. Red goes back to camp, and Croft and Gallagher take the soldier prisoner. Croft gives the prisoner a cigarette and some chocolate. The prisoner shows them a picture of his family, and Gallagher tells him his wife is going to have a baby soon. Croft gives him another cigarette and then shoots him in the face, which brings him a perverse sense of pleasure.

Wilson hears about a sergeant in another platoon who makes liquor. He borrows money from a few other men to buy some. Wilson buys four canteens and brings three back to the squad, hiding one for himself. The men get drunk together. Wilson offers Goldstein a drink, but he refuses. The men mock Goldstein for being Jewish, and he realizes he hates everyone around him. He writes to his wife that he cannot remember why he is fighting. Wilson drinks the canteen he stashed before going on watch. As he stands by the machine gun, drunk, he shoots a bush. The men wake up, thinking they are under attack. When Croft realizes that Wilson is the only one shooting, he yells at him.

Hearn sits on a beach relaxing with the other officers as the enlisted men work in the forest. He realizes he does not like any of the other officers, and he has stronger feelings of resentment towards the enlisted men. The men discuss all the important men they knew back in America, and one of them claims to have known Hearn's father. Hearn quickly realizes that this man did not know his father, and he likely did not know any of the other important people he claimed to know either.

A load of mail comes in. Wyman is upset because he did not get anything from his girlfriend. Red comforts him. Wilson's wife demands he send more money, and Wilson has Gallagher transcribe an angry response for him. Gallagher reads his own letters and discovers that an old friend earned a promotion that he was once up for. The chaplain reports to Gallagher that his wife has died in childbirth, but his child survived. He continues to get letters from his wife. When the last letter arrives, Gallagher becomes upset. He wonders what the point of fighting is.

Stanley, who has been promoted to corporal, clashes with Sergeant Brown. The two are unsure how to relate to each other. Stanley tells a story about a time he stole and then repaid money from a store he worked at to buy cheap furniture. From the beach, Croft spots a couple of Japanese soldiers in the forest. The platoon, led by Croft, shoots them both, but Minetta is hit in the leg. Stanley begins to wonder if his wife is being faithful.

The fighting settles down for a few weeks, and the lines begin to become stagnant. Cummings worries that the men are getting too comfortable in one place, which will make them unwilling to fight. He fears that if he cannot shift the front line, he will be replaced. His anxiety leads to health problems and constant outbursts directed at Hearn. Cummings commands Hearn to have Clellan, an enlisted man, put flowers in his tent each morning. This inspires conflict between Hearn and Clellan, as Cummings intends.

Hearn becomes frustrated and easily provoked. Cummings instructs him to pick up supplies for the officers' mess hall, but secretly pays off the seller to keep the goods from Hearn. Hearn bribes an assistant to get the supplies and later realizes what Cummings has done. Hearn realizes his past experiences with Cummings have all been aimed to anger him. Furious, Hearn extinguishes a cigarette on the floor of Cummings's tent when he is gone.

Cummings discovers that a sergeant has been falsifying his patrol reports and realizes that his entire command has likely been doing the same thing. He vows to crack down on disciplinary issues. He returns to his tent to discover Hearn's cigarette. He summons Hearn to his tent for the first time since they played chess. They have an intense discussion about the war and what will happen afterwards. Cummings reiterates his distaste for women. Cummings explains to Hearn that he wants to be a god. Cummings smokes a cigarette and throws it on the ground. He commands Hearn to pick it up or he will be court martialed. Hearns asks for a transfer to another division and Cummings denies his request, telling him to work labor under Dalleson. Hearns questions Cummings' ability to garner the respect of his unit.

Minetta is in the hospital from his gunshot wound, which is healing quickly. He worries that he will be sent back to the front lines, so he deliberately re-opens his wound and feigns insanity by firing his gun in the medical tent and yelling about enemy soldiers. A doctor is skeptical, but Minetta is sent to a separate tent for mental patients. Minetta spends a couple days in the mental ward and realizes he cannot take it anymore, so he claims to have woken up with no memory of the past week. The doctor who was skeptical pulls him aside and tells him that he knew Minetta was faking. When Minetta goes back to the platoon, he reports that the hospital was nicer than the front, so Red and Wilson try to report as sick. The doctors dismiss Red, but they caution Wilson that he'll need surgery after the war.

Cummings tries to devise a new attack plan. He thinks long and hard about the most effective ways to outmaneuver the Japanese. He comes up with a plan that he thinks will be militarily successful and also inspire the men to fight hard. Cummings asks Dalleson what he would think if Cummings transferred Hearn to another unit, which Dalleson perceives as odd, since generals are usually not concerned with such minutiae.

When Cummings hears that he will not get naval support, he has to adjust his attack plan. He comes up with a new strategy. The plan is to send a recon squad, led by Hearn, who Cummings will transfer, to scout a trail from the backside of the island towards the beach, thereby allowing Cummings to send in a full company through that route from the back. The secondary company would then overpower the beach defenses, allowing for a full invasion from the beach.

Hearn joins the recon platoon on the boat to the other side of the island. He immediately realizes that Croft knows more than he does, and he doesn't want the rest of the squad to realize that. Croft immediately dislikes Hearn because Hearn tries to befriend the men in the squad. Stanley tells Croft that he wishes Croft were still in charge. All the men are anxious about their own standing within the platoon, particularly the noncommissioned officers. Croft and Hearn struggle for control of the platoon early in the mission.

Roth and Minetta struggle to keep up with the rest of the platoon as they try to bushwack through the jungle. Croft gets on them for being slow, and Minetta snaps at Croft. Croft realizes Hearn will soon get comfortable around the platoon and take more control. Goldstein and Ridges end up doing most of Roth and Minetta’s work. Minetta picks on Roth for being Jewish, and Goldstein, who is also Jewish, takes Minetta's side. The platoon slowly works their way through the jungle out to open fields.

Hearn and Croft continue to subtly struggle for power. Hearn wants to try to go through a pass in the mountain range, but Croft wants to go over the mountain. Hearn continues to try to befriend the men in the platoon, which further angers Croft. Martinez, as the best at forging a trail, walks in front. Hearn stays in the back of the squad and realizes that no matter what he does he will not be able to get the men to like him.

The platoon comes across an exposed field. Hearn and Croft decide to split the platoon into two groups, one to lead the way and the other to provide cover. Croft offers to lead the first group, but Hearn elects to do it himself. The first group gets about halfway through the field when they begin taking fire. Hearn freezes when the shooting stops and realizes he is waiting for Croft to give an order. This realization frustrates him enough to get him to move. He leads the group in a retreat. They move away from the field for ten minutes before they realize Wilson is missing.

Wilson was shot in the stomach during the skirmish. Croft, Red, Gallagher, Ridges, and Goldstein find Wilson. They bring him back and realize his injury is too severe for him to continue. Polack, Roth, and Minetta gather materials to build a stretcher for Wilson, but Roth gets distracted by a baby bird. Everyone is looking at the bird as Croft builds the stretcher. Croft sees them gathered around the bird and goes into a rage. He crushes the bird and throws it. The men are furious about it, and Red decides that enough is enough and challenges Croft. Hearn breaks up the fight and orders Croft to apologize. He does so reluctantly and only becomes more angry at Hearn.

Brown, Stanley, Ridges, and Goldstein are assigned to carry Wilson back to the beach, and four more men (Minetta, Wyman, Polack, and Gallagher) go with them to help until they're far from Japanese lines, leaving just five men: Hearn, Croft, Red, Roth, and Martinez. After Minetta, Wyman, Polack, and Gallagher return to the rest of the platoon, Brown stresses over the responsibility that he has been given. He realizes how important it is to him that they bring Wilson back alive.

Back on the other side of the island, Cummings is pleasantly surprised by how well the attacks are going. He realizes he has misjudged his men's morale, since the men are more inclined to fight when they are restless. He receives word that he will receive more naval support than expected, and he wonders if the recon mission was necessary.

Roth is experiencing extreme anxiety, affecting his stomach and sleep. He talks to Red and tries to thank him for standing up to Croft. Red recognizes that if he allows himself to become close with Roth, Roth's death will be more painful, so he deliberately snaps at Roth to keep him distant. Red thinks to himself about the nature of the war and whether his fellow soldiers have died in vain. Hearn considers turning back, but he decides that he cannot face Cummings empty-handed, understanding his primary goal is to get back at Cummings.

That night, Hearn admits that there is nothing left to be gained, and he decides to turn around the next morning. However, Croft persuades him to send out a single man to see if the Japanese are still in the field where they were ambushed, agreeing to turn back if they are present. They pick Martinez as the recon man, but before he leaves, Croft tells Martinez to report to Hearn that he saw nothing.

At first, Martinez sees nothing. However, he soon realizes he has wandered into a Japanese camp, full of sleeping soldiers. He quietly kills the guard and escapes. He makes his way further through the valley and finds another Japanese camp. At this point, Martinez returns to the platoon and reports his findings to Croft. Croft warns him not to say anything about what he has seen to Hearn. Croft tells Hearn that Martinez saw nothing on his recon mission, and Hearn tries to go through the valley.

Hearn leads the men through the valley before being shot and killed. Croft feels a sense of relief. The men are generally apathetic about Hearn's death, seeing him as just another officer. Croft takes control of the platoon and decides to go over the mountain.

Brown, Stanley, Ridges, and Goldstein are still carrying Wilson back to the beach, which is difficult given the terrain, heat, and fatigue. The men fight and Wilson hallucinates. Stanley collapses and Brown stays with him.

Croft cracks down on discipline to reassert himself as the platoon leader. Martinez tells the other men that he saw Japanese soldiers on his recon mission, but when he reported it to Hearn, he did not believe it. Martinez and Gallagher, as the Catholics of the group, discuss their fear of death. Croft knows that he must reach the top of the mountain, or the trick he pulled that got Hearn killed would be for nothing. But the mountain is extremely difficult, and the men are unmotivated. Goldstein and Ridges continue to carry Wilson. By the end of the day, they have advanced five miles since they left Brown and Stanley.

Cummings leaves the island to appeal for more naval support, and Dalleson is left in charge. He receives a report indicating a large breach in the Japanese lines and sees no choice but to attack. He finds himself hoping that the report is untrue, because he is unsure of what to do in the case that the report is correct. He realizes he is unqualified to be leading the Army in such a situation, and he wishes Cummings had not left. Dalleson quickly throws together an attack plan, which is successful. The Japanese general is killed, along with much of his support staff. Cummings returns with the destroyer, only to find it is no longer needed. The Americans finish the campaign, while Cummings has forgotten the recon mission.

On the mountain, the platoon has no idea what is happening with the rest of the campaign. The mountain proves treacherous, and every man in the platoon, including Croft, desires to turn back. Minetta, Wyman, and Roth are dragging behind the rest of the squad. Roth begins to fall, to the increasing irritation of the platoon. Roth falls again and asks to be left behind. Gallagher hits him and yells, "Get up, you Jew bastard!" The comment angers Roth enough to motivate him to stand and continue. They come to a gap and are forced to jump over. Roth falls to his death after being goaded by Gallagher.

Both Ridges and Goldstein consider leaving Wilson, who is dying, but decide they cannot for religious reasons. Ridges asks Wilson to repent before he dies, and Wilson, who is no longer lucid, agrees. As they rest in preparation to cross a river, Wilson dies. Ridges and Goldstein continue to carry his body, but as they cross the river, they lose it. Ridges and Goldstein make it back to the beach wait for the rest of the squad.

The platoon is shaken after Roth's death. They move a little bit farther and decide to camp for the night. Gallagher feels guilty over Roth's death. The next morning, Gallagher and Martinez turn on Croft and demand that they turn back. However, Croft orders the men to continue. Red declares that he will not continue either, and Croft threatens to shoot him. Red eventually backs down one final time.

Croft turns around a bend only to directly upset a hornets' nest. The men run back to evade the hornets, and in their hurry, toss away their packs and rifles. Within fifteen minutes, they make it back farther than the place they started that morning. Croft, weary, gives the order that they will go back to the beach and wait for the boat to bring them back to the American lines.

The surviving members of the platoon reunite on the beach. Stanley and Brown arrive only a few hours before Croft's group. Once the boat picks them up, they learn the campaign is over. They share laughter for a while, which is slowly replaced by a silent sadness, questioning whether the entire patrol was for naught.

Later, Cummings discovers that a Japanese supply depot had been destroyed by artillery fire weeks before. The Japanese lines had been falling apart for months, and a week before the final attack, the Japanese had run out of ammo. Cummings looks back at his intelligence reports and sees that they gave no indication of Japanese weaknesses. He realizes his victory was based on luck rather than strategy, frustrating Cummings. The novel ends with Major Dalleson thinking of a new way to implement map training exercises, indicating that the structure of war will remain unchanged.

== Main characters ==
- Hennessey is a newer member of the platoon. He is very cautious with all of his gear and movements so as to not get killed. When they arrive at the beach of Anopopei, he defecates in his pants out of fear during the opening action scene. He has a mental breakdown and runs down the beach in hopes of getting new pants. He is killed soon after by shrapnel from an exploding mortar shell.
- Woodrow Wilson is a large, impoverished white Southerner. He has a happy-go-lucky and generous nature. In his "Time Machine" we learn Wilson wakes up married to a woman named Alice after a drunken night at the bar. Their marriage consists of love affairs and money troubles. Later, Wilson suffers a long, agonizing death after being shot in the stomach by the Japanese; Brown, Goldstein, Ridges, and Stanley try to carry him back to the beach to be saved but he dies on the way there. He is named after the 28th President of the United States.
- Julio Martinez is a Mexican-American from Texas. He is nicknamed Japbait by Croft and made sergeant in General Cummings's infantry division. Martinez was terrified, constantly on edge and an introvert throughout the beginning of the novel. He however, gains bravery through battle and is an excellent soldier, especially in terms of getting a scope for the land. He is well trusted by the other men in the platoon. Croft convinces Martinez to lie about a Japanese platoon he saw on a solo scouting mission, which leads to the death of Hearn and to the men hiking to Mount Anaka under Croft's command.
- Sam Croft has a large ego and is coldblooded throughout the novel. At one point, he immorally kills a Japanese POW. Later, he squeezes Roth’s baby bird to death as if he is crushing all innocence. He loves war and is Mailer’s version of a psychopath within the novel. He is seen as one of the best soldiers in the platoon and the other men both fear and respect him as a leader. In his time capsule, we learned he was cheated on by the women he loved which led to him being cold and developing a love for war. At the conclusion of the book, Croft refuses to look forward to his homecoming, believing that the war will continue for much longer. After all, he enjoys the war because he finds a thrill in killing.
- Red Valsen claims he does not want to rise in the ranks. He appears numb to death and the war itself. As a child, he grew up in a mining town in Montana. Later, he runs away from home, losing contact with his entire family. After holding many jobs, Red moves in with his girlfriend Lois and her son. Afraid of commitment, Red joins the Army and runs away from Lois. While in the Army, Red loses contact with Lois just like he did with his own family.
- Lieutenant Robert Hearn is the stereotypical white liberal. Harvard educated and from an affluent family, Hearn is General Cummings’s assistant. He despises the caste system within the Army, wishing that he could reach out to the lower class foot soldiers. Later, Cummings transfers Hearn to Dalleson’s section. He leads the platoon through the jungle and to the mountain pass. Here, he is shot and killed quickly and anticlimactically not expecting Japanese resistance after Croft keeps the information from him.
- General Edward Cummings is power-hungry, often comparing himself to God. As a child, Cummings experiences gender-role confusion. This forces his father to send him to military school. Later, Cummings attends West Point. While at West Point, he meets Margaret and feels socially pressured into marrying her. Margaret and Cummings are married and never have children. They have an unhappy marriage, perhaps due to Cummings homosexual tendencies and feelings. It is apparent through his conversations with Hearn that he has romantic feelings for him.
- Roy Gallagher is Boston Irish and part of an Anti-Semitic gang called Christians United. He always seems angry throughout the novel. Later, he learns that his wife Mary died in childbirth, but their baby lived. Gallagher remains devastated for the rest of the novel.
- Roth is a depressing, fickle stereotypical representation of a Jew. He, however, refuses to consider himself to be such. Roth strongly associates with Judaism. Throughout the novel, he has a superiority complex because he is better educated than the other men of the platoon. Roth dies while climbing the mountain because he misses a jump and fails to grasp Gallagher’s hand.
- Joey Goldstein is also Jewish like Roth. However, unlike Roth, he does not view himself as better than his Christian friends. Goldstein grows up as a mamma’s boy and desires to own his own shop. Later, he becomes a welder and marries Natalie, despite his mother’s disapproval. After their son is born, Goldstein struggles to support his family and maintain a loving relationship with his wife. Throughout the war, Goldstein is well-respected by his comrades, although he does lack courage at times.
- William Brown is the stereotypical well-liked, neighborhood boy. Growing up in a middle-class family, Brown later attends a state university. Here he joins a fraternity and flunks out by freshman year. He marries a girl from his high school, Beverly, and lives a fairly boring life. Throughout the war, he worries that Beverly will cheat on him while he’s away. He is certain that he will throw her out of the house when he returns home.
- Stanley insists that women are no different from men. He trusts his wife Ruthie, who is the mother of his child. In some ways, he is the quiet feminist within the novel. He is also more ambitious than the other soldiers, since he is inexperienced in war; he desires to move up in ranks and befriends Brown in order to do so.
- Toglio is an Italian-American. Patriotic, trusting, and good-natured, he is friends with most of his platoon. He sustains a million-dollar wound during combat and is sent home. Subsequently, as time passes, some characters come to envy his wound and grow to hate him.
- Casimir "Polack" Czienwicz comes from a lower-class Polish family. He grows up with seven siblings and, after his father dies, he enters the orphanage. At thirteen, an older woman seduces him multiple times. These experiences make Polack a tough, courageous soldier in the Army.
- Oscar Ridges is extremely Christian. He assures Wyman, who refers to him as “the preacher,” that “The Lord’ll keep me from shooting a Christian”. Despite his Christian beliefs, Ridges befriends Goldstein as his buddy. This friendship between a Jew and Christian demonstrates how the war brought men of different backgrounds together.
- Buddy Wyman does not play a major role within the novel. He dreams of becoming a war hero in order to support his mother and himself.
- Steven Minetta is twenty years old and was known as the “best dresser on the block” when he was growing up. He is eventually wounded but then returns to the platoon. At the conclusion of the novel, Minetta feels anger towards power figures and hopes to “expose the goddam Army.”
- Dalleson was second in command to Cummings, who deliberately picked an officer of lower rank so that he could be intimidated. He was very nervous throughout the novel and did not trust his own judgment. At the end of the novel, however, it is Dalleson's attack plan and his competent handling of forces that help win the battle against the Japanese.

== Themes ==
Throughout the novel, Mailer dwells on many themes. These themes are recurring throughout his works and reappear in several of his later essays and novels.

=== Dehumanization of soldiers ===
Commenting on the dehumanization of soldiers in The Naked and the Dead, Mailer said, "The book finds man corrupted, confused to the point of helplessness, but it also find that there are limits beyond which he cannot be pushed." The narrator illustrates the exhaustion and humiliation of the soldiers' life: “When a man was harnessed into a pack and web belt and carried a rifle and two bandoliers and several grenades, a bayonet and a helmet, he felt as if he had a tourniquet over both shoulders and across his chest. It was hard to breathe and his limbs kept falling asleep.” Dehumanization of the soldier is also seen in Chapter 5 when the platoon had to carry antitank guns between 1st Battalion and A Company, which was about a mile of muddy trail. The men became numb and only went through the motions of carrying the guns and the generals disregarded the soldiers' exhaustion. The soldiers generally believed the army didn't see them as people and that "they don't care if you live or die here [the infirmary]. All they want is to get you back where you can stop a bullet".

Mailer described The Naked and the Dead as "'an odyssey of fear, exhaustion, and death,'" and presents the natural world as "uncaring, unyielding, implacable, and occasionally, beautiful." He adds insights into soldiers, like Martinez, in this context. Mailer writes that on his scouting mission, "Martinez was functioning more like an animal than a human." Mailer also distils how dehumanizing the enemy was an essential aspect to the structure of war. Mailer writes, "Martinez had a sense of unreality . . . They were men. The entire structure of war wavered in his brain for a moment."

Mailer concludes the platoon's climb of Mount Anaka, reinforcing the loss of the individual within war, writing that "[the soldiers] did not think of themselves as individual men any longer. They were merely envelopes of suffering. They had forgotten about the patrol, about the war, their past, they had even forgotten the earth they had just climbed."

=== Loneliness ===
Loneliness acted as an equalizer among soldiers and officers during the Second World War. Despite divisions of rank, economic, political, sexuality, or class, loneliness was a universal phenomenon among soldiers and officers during the Second World War. Furthermore, this factored into the construction of brotherhood in wartime. In The Naked and the Dead, Goldstein feels a connection and a sort of alliance with Roth in their Jewish heritage. Although the men in the platoon do have a sense of brotherhood with one another, they still feel alone during their deployment. Throughout the novel, the men long for women and deeper friendships. Roth, for example, wishes to have someone whom he “could talk to seriously.” He realizes that he doesn’t know his own comrades very well, since everyone he met when he initially entered the Army was either killed or reassigned. The men degrade women through the narrative; however, the absence of women factors into their reaction to disparage women, whose presence on the front lines was limited.

=== Death ===
The men are faced with unexpected deaths, such as Hennessey's, Wilson, Hearn, Roth, and Gallagher’s wife who dies during childbirth. It is clear death surrounds them and their lives could be taken away in any moment. Cummings, having been surrounded by Army deaths the majority of his career, still never warms to the smell of rotting corpses. Red, like the other soldiers, realizes he or one of his comrades could be killed any minute. Even when they grew used to death and saw it as "large and devastating and meaningless. Men who were killed were nearly men no longer around", a comrade's death would cause "the idea of death [to be] fresh and terrifying again". This fear of death also had a negative impact on the mental health and sanity of the men. For instance, Red states, "Goddam Army gets you so you're afraid to turn around". The men began to have a pessimistic view of life believing "All dead things... everything lives to die". This was especially so since "that's all [soldiers] can ever do in the Army, sit and think" which caused the thoughts and fears of death to be constant and prevalent.

The first death in the novel introduces this theme into the narrative. Red observes Hennessey's death. The narrator reveals "[u]ntil Hennessy had been killed, Red had accepted all the deaths of the men he knew as something large and devastating and meaningless . . . Hennessey's death had opened a secret fear." Croft is also surprisingly moved by Hennessey's death. The narrator declares "Hennessey's death had opened to Croft vistas of such omnipotence that he was afraid to consider it directly. All day the fact hovered about his head, tantalizing him with odd dreams and portents of power." Gallagher's wife, Mary dies in childbirth in America. When Gallagher learns of her death, he continues to receive letters she sent before her death. Because of the disparity of time and space between men and women and their families during wartime, Gallagher considers that Mary "lived for him only at the exact time when he read her letters."

On the mission across Mount Anaka, Roth discovers a baby bird, and the platoon, with the exception of Croft, are fascinated by the bird. The bird symbolizes innocence and the futility of death during war, as Roth cares for the baby bird and Croft is then enraged by it and crushes the bird in his hand. The contrast between Hearn and Roth's deaths reflects both the bonds of brotherhood made among soldiers during war and the division between rank. Lieutenant Hearn's death is immediate and has little recovery time, with the platoon mourning for ten or twenty seconds. Croft is even relieved by Hearn's death, as he is now in charge of the platoon again. In contrast, Roth's death "shatter[s] the platoon." Instead of choosing to face Croft, Roth chose to risk falling to his death. Not only is the platoon shattered, Mailer underlines the division between the empowered and powerless, the narrator declares, "It was Croft's fault that Roth had been killed."

=== Power ===
Mailer's predominant theme throughout The Naked and the Dead is illustrated through the power relations among the men, especially the relationships between commanding officers and subordinates. Power is distilled in General Cummings's character. Cummings compares himself to the “chief monk” and God throughout the book. He also openly supports the class system within the military, and states Hearn must accept the “emotional prejudices of his class”, especially since he is an officer. People of higher ranks like Hearn and Cummings, after all, enjoy a better quality of life than the other foot soldiers. They sleep in larger staterooms while the soldiers share small rooms and are jammed into cots. This power system and power relations is reinforced within the missions. After Hearn dies, Croft is "relieved" that there is no longer a rival to his power and takes over leading the platoon up the mountain. While the other soldiers clearly want to stop and give up, they continue hiking the mountain simply because Croft commands them to. Chickenshit, as termed by Paul Fussell in Wartime: Understanding and Behavior in the Second World War, was a major aspect of the theme of power in the novel. This is shown in how Cummings makes Hearn do humiliating tasks and in the end sends him on a mission knowing he will die, which is the ultimate chickenshit since he sent him to die solely to demonstrate his power. This is another instance where the undemocratic nature of the Army is apparent. Analogous to the replacement of "fuck" with "fug," Fussell commented on the obscenity in war, arguing that explicit language in wartime became precious as a way for millions of conscripts to note, in a licensed way, their bitterness and anger.

During his service in World War II, Mailer did not yet have a plan for his war novel, but knew that he wanted to write a combat novel specifically set in the Philippines where "the American hunger for power was palpable." Mailer told his sister that he wrote to his wife, Bea, about his plans for a novella with "'a ridge or a peak as a symbol' of 'the higher aspirations of man, the craving for the secret, the core of life,'" and the Faustian need for power. In another letter to his wife, Mailer recounted an encounter with the top mess sergeant, who called him "'a chickenshit son of a bitch.'" This real life incident inspired Mailer to construct the pivotal confrontation between General Cummings and Lieutenant Hearn which leads indirectly to Hearn's death. Initially, Cummings burdens Hearn with small, chickenshit tasks, and later Hearn retaliates within restricted power dynamics by dropping a match on the General's floor and grounds it into the floor with his heel. According to General Cummings, "what Hearn had done was equivalent to a soldier's laying hands on his person." Thus, Cummings transfers Hearn to the platoon with Croft.

During World War II, General Patton was considered one of the most fastidious perpetuators of chickenshit, constantly enforcing the Army's dress code on his soldiers. Similarly, in The Naked and the Dead, Dalleson harps on pride in the outfit of the Army.

J. Michael Lennon, Mailer's definitive biographer, claims that "Mailer's landscape descriptions crackle and pulse with energy and must be ranked among the best of postwar American writers.". Diana Trilling observed, "'The most dramatic moments in The Naked and the Dead are precipitated by intensities in nature.'" While writing his combat novel, Mailer stated that "[t]here are going to be troubling terrifying glimpses of order in disorder, of a horror which may or may not lurk beneath the surface of things.'" Hennessey's death as well as Croft, Reed, and Martinez's "primitive glimpses of a structure behind things" is Mailer's depiction of '"the old business of man constructing little tag-ends of a Gd for himself in his moral wilderness.'" Mailer argued that everything is more direct in war and this dramatically impacts the senses and one's perception of realism. Mailer depicts this theme of power in nature and man's subjection to that in Cummings and Croft's reflection on Mount Anaka.

=== Homosexuality ===
The theme of homosexuality is most evident through Cummings. In his "Time Machine", Mailer illustrates Cummings growing up experiencing gender-role confusion. Although his mother supports Cummings' identity, his father refuses to have a son who is homosexual and thus sends him to military school. This portages the notion of the Army being only for "real men". However, there were a lot of homosexual men who were soldiers during WWII and as Allan Bérubé illustrates in Coming Out Under Fire: History of Gay Men and Women in World War Two, they were often seen as trusted and respected soldiers and medics. While in the Army, it is clear Cummings developed romantic feelings towards Hearn and sexually desired him. Through Cummings, Mailer illustrates his beliefs about homosexuality. Although Mailer believes being homosexual is evil, it is interesting he had the general be the homosexual character in the novel, especially since he depicts the general as being a powerful figure who is a good leader. Mailer also includes homosexual characters in his other works as well, such as in The Deer Park. Mailer directly addresses this theme and his beliefs about homosexuality in "The Homosexual Villain," stating he saw homosexuals as evil and always depicted them as the villain in his works but realized they were humans. Mailer utilizes the trope that men coded as homosexual are villains, repressed, and effeminate.

=== Brotherhood ===
The Naked and the Dead depicts the bonds of brotherhood during World War II, particularly examining the relationships among platoons. During World War II, soldiers developed strong friendships to which civilians could not relate. Croft expresses his feelings of brotherhood and tells his comrades, “You’re all good guys. You’re all chicken, and you’re all yellow, but you’re good guys. They ain’t a goddam thing wrong with you.” Mailer's use of Croft in this scene emphasizes the unilateral sentiment and necessity of brotherhood during wartime. The theme recurs in Part III when Brown, Goldstein, Ridges, and Stanley attempt to carry the wounded Wilson back to camp. Despite the physical strains, the men persisted in order to save Wilson. The brotherhood of the platoon is also illustrated by the group's reactions to the deaths of Hearn and Roth. New to the platoon, Hearn, when he was killed by Japanese soldiers, the platoon stood shocked for a couple of seconds but quickly moved on under the continued leadership of Croft. However, in the wake of Roth's death, "the platoon was shattered. For ten minutes they huddled together on the shelf, too stricken, too terrified, to move on. The gravity of Roth's death demonstrates the deep bond of brotherhood, pervasive not only during World War II but more specifically within the platoon.

=== Masculinity ===
The Naked and the Dead acts as Mailer's introduction into the literary pantheon, and like his later works, Mailer portrays women as sexual objects. Many men, especially Brown, fear their wives are cheating on them while they are at war. This causes them to have more hatred towards women and a deep distrust towards them. Brown tells Stanley that if he finds out his wife cheated on him, he will beat her then throw her out. Later, in the Chorus “Women,” Polack insists that “there ain’t a fuggin woman is any good” and Brown agrees. Women are especially emphasized within "Time Machine" segments. In these segments, the men’s romantic relationships and sexual experiences are described in detail. In many of the "Time Machines", such as Martinez's, women are portrayed as simply sexual objects. In Croft's "Time Machine", we learn he was cheated on by the women he loved which resulted in him being cold and having a hatred towards women. The men seem to disregard the fact that they have cheated several times on their partners but show extreme hatred in the thought of their wives cheating on them. The only character that seems to positively view his wife is Gallagher, who becomes miserable and lost after she dies. This deep hatred for women, however, is a way to mask how strongly these men miss and desire women; they desperately need women for a variety of different reasons. Mailer exemplifies the construction of the masculine identity, and analyzes masculinity as socially constructed, context-specific and culture-bound. Male studies enforces The Naked and the Dead as part of American literature which reflects American society's conception of masculinity based on the representation of masculinity in American fiction. The construction of American masculinity predicated on violence and adventure narratives is particularly distilled in Croft as the typified combat soldier.

== Development ==
Writing development: Before he left for basic training, Mailer was certain that he could write "THE war novel" based on his experiences as a cook and the experiences of soldiers in World War II. After returning home from the war, he moved to France with his first wife, Beatrice, where he studied at the Sorbonne in Paris. Here, in just 15 months, Mailer wrote his war novel as noted in his introduction to its Fiftieth Anniversary Edition.

Mailer states his writing inspiration came from the great Russian novelists like Leo Tolstoy. While writing, Mailer often read "from Anna Karenina most mornings before he commenced his own work." Mailer believed Tolstoy enabled him to bring compassion to his pages; Tolstoy taught him "compassion is valueless without severity." Mailer was convinced he brought this compassion to The Naked and the Dead, and it is what enabled a 25-year-old to write an incredible war novel. The influence of the U.S.A. trilogy on the text has also been noted.

Throughout his writing process, Mailer explained, he "used to write twenty-five pages of first draft a week," which allowed his novel to flow from page to page. Mailer felt this novel was the easiest for him to write, as he finished it quickly and passionately. He later stated, "Part of me thought it was possibly the greatest book written since War and Peace."

Despite the author’s self-praise, he acknowledged his writing immaturity within the novel. Mailer insisted "it was sloppily written in many parts (the words came too quickly and too easily) and there was hardly a noun in any sentence that was not holding hands with the nearest and most commonly available adjective." However, despite this criticism, Mailer believed the book deserved to be a best seller. It was written with vigor and contained acute descriptiveness which enabled readers to imagine what World War II was really like. Mailer admitted that he still returned to The Naked and the Dead occasionally and reread passages because they gave him hope “for all of us”.

Character that represents Mailer: Mailer stated he did not portray himself as one of the characters. However, he mentions the character of Roth is the most similar to himself. He states Roth's experiences within the novel closely resembled his own experiences in WWII, especially in comparison to the other characters. This similarity is also evident in how they are both Jewish but don't necessarily strongly declare being Jewish.

=== "Fug" ===
The publishers of The Naked and the Dead prevented Mailer from using the word "fuck" in his novel, and he had to use the euphemism "fug" instead. In 1988, Mailer shared an anecdote about the word:

The word has been a source of great embarrassment to me over the years because, you know, Tallulah Bankhead's press agent, many years ago, got a story in the papers which went..."Oh, hello, you're Norman Mailer," said Tallulah Bankhead allegedly, "You're the young man that doesn't know how to spell..." You know, the four-letter word was indicated with all sorts of asterisks.

The incident is mentioned in John Green's An Abundance of Katherines (2006). Colin Singleton tells Lindsey Lee Wells he likes to read literary criticism after reading a book. Colin says the publisher indicated that no one in 1948 would buy The Naked and the Dead "'because it contains even more F-bombs than it does Regular Bombs.' So Norman Mailer, as a kind of fug-you to the publisher, went through his 872-page book and changed every last F-word to 'fug.'"

The rock band the Fugs took their name from this word.

== Reception ==
The Naked and the Dead was published in 1948, when Mailer was twenty-five years of age. The book drew immediate commercial success, selling 200,000 copies in its first three months and remaining on the New York Times best seller list for 62 weeks. In 1949 George Orwell wrote about the novel in a comment that would appear on paperback copies of the book for decades that it was “awfully good, the best war book of the last war yet.” Later, Modern Library named The Naked and the Dead one of the top hundred novels in the English language.

Publisher Bennett Cerf declared in 1948 "only three novels published since the first of the year that were worth reading ... Cry, the Beloved Country, The Ides of March, and The Naked and the Dead."

Hartley Shawcross as Attorney General for England and Wales explained why he would not prosecute the book under the Obscene Publications Acts: "Whilst there is much in this most tedious and lengthy book which is foul, lewd and revolting, looking at it as a whole I do not think that its intent is to corrupt or deprave or that it is likely to lead to any result other than disgust at its contents." Tom Driberg welcomed the decision. In its initial review the Times Literary Supplement complained that the novel "grows increasingly unreadable" due to Mailer's tendency to "leave nothing out". The Daily Telegraph described the novel as "dull" for the same reason.

Later, Gore Vidal would write:

My first reaction to The Naked and the Dead was: it’s a fake. A clever, talented, admirably executed fake. I have not changed my opinion of the book since… I do recall a fine description of men carrying a dying man down a mountain… Yet every time I got going in the narrative I would find myself stopped cold by a set of made-up, predictable characters taken not from life, but from the same novels all of us had read, and informed by a naïveté which was at its worst when Mailer went into his Time-Machine and wrote those passages which resemble nothing so much as smudged carbons of a Dos Passos work.
