= The Ides of March (novel) =

1948 novel by Thornton Wilder

- First edition
- Author: Thornton Wilder
- Language: English
- Subject: Julius Caesar
- Genre: Historical fiction
- Publisher: Harper & Brothers
- Publication date: February 18, 1948
- Publication place: United States
- Media type: Print (hardcover)
- Pages: 246 pp
- OCLC: 519672619
- LC Class: PZ3.W6468 Id

The Ides of March is an epistolary novel by Thornton Wilder that was published in 1948. In the author's words, it is 'a fantasia on certain events and persons of the last days of the Roman republic. Historical reconstruction is not among the primary aims of this work'. The novel deals with the characters and events leading to, and culminating in, the assassination of Julius Caesar.

== Context ==
The novel is divided into four books, each starting earlier and ending later than the previous book. Catullus' poems and the closing section by Suetonius are the only documents in the book that are not imagined; however, many of the events are historical, such as Cleopatra's visit to Rome.

Though the novel describes events leading up to Caesar's assassination on 15 March 44 BC, several earlier events are described as if they were contemporary. Thus, the violation of the Bona Dea mysteries by Publius Clodius Pulcher, Caesar's subsequent divorce of his second wife Pompeia, and the circulation of two poems by Catullus suggesting that Caesar and his engineer, Mamurra, were lovers (and Catallus's subsequent apology) are transposed from December 62 BC to December 45 BC. In addition, many characters depicted as living in the novel were dead by 44 BC, including M. Porcius Cato (in 46 BC), Catullus (in c. 54 BC), Julia (in 69 BC) and Clodius (in 52 BC).

== Major characters ==
Note that names, relationships, and events are described as they occur in the novel and are not necessarily historically accurate.

- Julius Caesar, ruler of Rome
- Lucius Mamilius Turrinus, a friend of Caesar's, is now living in retirement; various characters write to him, but he never replies.
- Clodia, an angry, intelligent, and fascinating woman; the ridicule of Roman society, she lives a life of scandal.
- Publius Clodius Pulcher, her brigand brother; he plays only a minor role.
- Cicero, an orator, statesman, political theorist, lawyer, and philosopher
- Julia Marcia, Caesar's aunt.
- Pompeia, Caesar's second wife.
- Cornelius Nepos, a biographer and historian.
- Catullus, a poet who loved Clodia. The poems of Catullus included in the novel are the actual poems, although some are offered in Wilder's translation.
- Cleopatra, queen of Egypt and mistress of Caesar.
- Cytheris, an actress of common birth, greatly admired by Caesar; she 'remade' Marc Anthony and was his lover for 15 years.
- Marc Antony, initially the lover of Cytheris, meets and falls in love with Cleopatra throughout the novel.
- Marcus Porcius Cato, renowned Stoic of famous integrity, leader of the opposition to Caesar's dictatorship
- Servilia, former mistress of Caesar, half-sister to Cato, mother of Brutus
- Brutus, the most famous of Julius Caesar's assassins, nephew of Cato
- Porcia, wife of Brutus, daughter to Cato
- Calpurnia, third wife of Caesar.
- Suetonius was a prominent Roman historian and biographer; his (historical) account of the assassination closes the novel.

== Reception ==
American publisher Bennett Cerf remarked at that year's meeting of the American Booksellers Association that there had been "only three novels published since the first of the year that were worth reading ... Cry, the Beloved Country, The Ides of March, and The Naked and the Dead. Wilder himself once wrote that the book was "a kind of crossword puzzle" that "only begins to speak at its second reading." Edmund Fuller called the novel "a text so rich that it requires exploration rather than reading."
