= Dorothy Carnegie =

American writer (1912–1998)

- Born: Dorothy Reeder Price; November 2, 1912; Tulsa, Oklahoma, U.S.
- Died: August 6, 1998 (aged 85)
- Occupation: Writer
- Known for: Author, Leader of Dale Carnegie organization
- Notable work: Dale Carnegie's Scrapbook; How to Help Your Husband Get Ahead in His Social and Business Life; The Quick and Easy Way to Effective Speaking
- Spouses: Dale Carnegie (m. 1944; died 1955) David Rivkin (m. 1976)

Dorothy Carnegie (born Dorothy Reeder Price; November 2, 1912 – August 6, 1998) was an American writer. She was the wife of writer and lecturer Dale Carnegie. Following her husband's demise, she assumed his position as the leader of the self-improvement empire bearing his name. Additionally, she established herself as an author, penning works like Dale Carnegie's Scrapbook and Guiding Your Spouse Towards Success.

== Early life and education ==
Dorothy Reeder Price was born November 2, 1912 in Tulsa, Oklahoma. As a divorced mother with a young daughter, she faced the responsibility of providing for her family after an ill-fated teenage marriage. In pursuit of personal and professional growth, she enrolled in a Dale Carnegie course held at a Young Men's Christian Association hall.

Dorothy attributed the valuable skills she acquired from the course to her ascent from a stenographer to the esteemed position of senior secretary at Gulf Oil Corporation. Additionally, she demonstrated her leadership abilities by assuming the presidency of the Young Republicans Club in Tulsa.

== Works ==
Carnegie wrote several books during her lifetime. These include:

- Dale Carnegie (1959). Dorothy Carnegie (ed.). Dale Carnegie's Scrapbook: A Treasury of the Wisdom of the Ages. Simon and Schuster. p. 241. ISBN 9780671189501.
- Dorothy Carnegie (1953). How to Help Your Husband Get Ahead in His Social and Business Life. the University of Virginia: Pyramid books. p. 251.
- Dale Carnegie, Dorothy Carnegie (1977). Dorothy Carnegie (ed.). The Quick and Easy Way to Effective Speaking (reprint, revised ed.). Simon and Schuster. p. 221. ISBN 9780671724009. - based upon Dale Carnegie's own notes and ideas.

== Personal life ==
On 5 November, 1944, she (who also had been divorced) married Dale Carnegie. From her previous marriage, she had a daughter named Rosemary. With Carnegie, she had a daughter named Donna Dale Dorothy. After Dale's death, Carnegie married David Rivkin from Tulsa in 1976. While she retired from active company management in 1978, she continued to hold the position of chairwoman.
