= How to Stop Worrying and Start Living =

1948 self-help book by Dale Carnegie

- Author: Dale Carnegie
- Language: English
- Subject: Self-help
- Genre: Non-fiction
- Publisher: Simon and Schuster (1948)
- Publication date: 1948
- Media type: Print (Paperback)
- Pages: 306 pp
- ISBN: 0671035975
- OCLC: 203759

How to Stop Worrying and Start Living is a self-help book by Dale Carnegie first printed in 1948. A June 1948 Time review reported that 125,000 advance copies were already in print. Carnegie says in the preface that he wrote it because he "was one of the unhappiest lads in New York". He said that he made himself sick with worry because he hated his position in life, which he credits for wanting to figure out how to stop worrying. The book's goal is to lead the reader to a more enjoyable and fulfilling life, helping them to become more aware of, not only themselves, but others around them. Carnegie tries to address the everyday nuances of living, in order to get the reader to focus on the more important aspects of life.

The book's title is satirically referenced in that of the film Dr. Strangelove.

== Critical reception ==
A June 1948 Time review said Carnegie had spent seven years on the book and called his "assault on worry" "irresistible," while noting that the book "is composed chiefly of worrywarts' case histories" and is "crammed with anti-worry rules."

In a June 1948 New Yorker Comment, E. B. White wrote that he had been reading the book hoping to change the course of his life, "but the effect so far has been to increase our anxieties."
