= Raintree County (novel) =

Book by Ross Lockridge Jr.

- First edition cover
- Author: Ross Lockridge Jr.
- Illustrator: John V. Morris
- Cover artist: Ross Lockridge Jr.
- Language: English
- Genre: Historical fiction
- Set in: Raintree County, Indiana (fictional), mid to late 19th century
- Publisher: Houghton Mifflin
- Publication date: January 5th, 1948
- Publication place: United States
- Media type: Print
- Pages: 1066
- Awards: MGM Book of the Year Award
- Dewey Decimal: 813.54

Raintree County is a novel by Ross Lockridge Jr. published in 1948. It tells the story of a small-town Midwestern teacher and poet named John Shawnessy, who, in his younger days before his service as a Union soldier in the Civil War, met and married a beautiful Southern belle; however, her emotional instability leads to the destruction of their marriage.

== Structure ==
Map of Raintree County by illustrator John V. Morris, based on author's sketch

The novel, set in fictional Raintree County, Indiana, is essentially in two parts; before the Civil War and after. It spans the 19th century history of the United States, from the pre-Civil War westward expansion, to the debate over slavery, to the Civil War, to the Industrial Revolution and the Labor Movement which followed. The book is often surreal, with dream sequences, flashbacks and departures from the linear narrative. It has been described as an effort to mythologize the history of America, which to a great degree it succeeds in doing through the eyes and the commentary of John Shawnessy. For example, a number of turning points in John's life seem to coincide with Fourth of July celebrations.

John, or 'Johnny', as he was called before The War, is a lover of literature, and is influenced by three separate cultural icons: the concept of becoming a Hero, in the sense of the legendary figures of ancient Greece; Nathaniel Hawthorne's "The Great Stone Face", in which legend predicts that a great man will appear whose face is identical to the natural stone face which, in the Hawthorne story, is a local landmark; and finally, the quest to find the legendary Golden Raintree, for which the county was named, and which was supposedly planted somewhere in the county by John Chapman, or Johnny Appleseed as he was more commonly known. Johnny Shawnessy tends to view the events of his life through the prism of one or more of these contexts, and to draw parallels to these legends, frequently with considerable justification.

On Johnny's return from the war, he learns that he has been reported as killed in action, and that the love of his life, believing him dead, has married his longtime friend and rival, and has died in childbirth.

John, as he is now known, has to set about building a new life. He becomes a teacher, runs unsuccessfully for political office, moves briefly to New York to try to become a playwright, and finally comes back home to Indiana, where he remarries. Although he finds contentment in his marriage, he encounters various other personal difficulties, and is a first-hand observer to a number of historical turning points.

It is a long novel, around 400,000 words. Most editions run to about 1000 pages.

The fictional town of Waycross was based on Straughn, Indiana and the fictional Raintree County was based on Henry County, Indiana.

== The film ==
The novel was made into a 1957 film starring Montgomery Clift, Elizabeth Taylor, Eva Marie Saint, Nigel Patrick, Lee Marvin, Rod Taylor and Agnes Moorehead. It was adapted by Millard Kaufman and directed by Edward Dmytryk. The film varies significantly in content from the novel.
