= List of roles and awards of Neve Campbell =

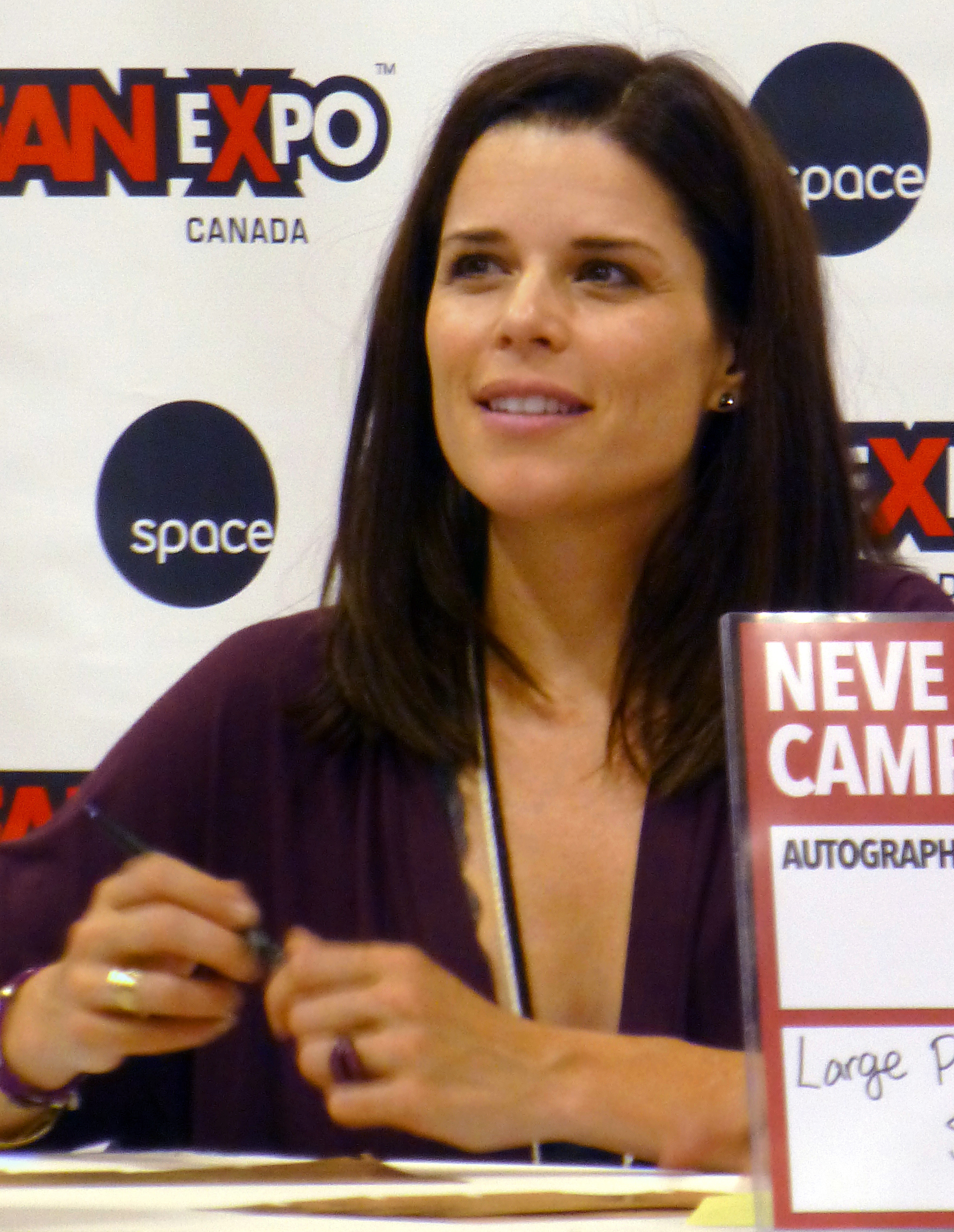
Campbell at Fan Expo Canada in 2015

Neve Campbell is a Canadian actress. She began her career with television commercials and small roles in local shows and films. She relocated to the United States to play Julia Salinger in the teen drama television series Party of Five (1994–‍2000), which became her breakthrough role. She then rose to international prominence for her leading roles as a witch in The Craft (1996) and final girl Sidney Prescott in Scream (1996), both of which were blockbuster horror films. Scream established her as a scream queen and spawned the Scream franchise, in which she reprised her role in every film except the sixth. She won two Blockbuster Entertainment Awards for Favourite Actress in 1998 and in 2001, and was twice nominated for both the Saturn Award for Best Actress – winning in 1997 – and the MTV Movie Award for Best Female Performance – winning in 1998.

After leaving Party of Five in 2000, Campbell expanded her profile by starring as an outcast student in the thriller film Wild Things (1998) and a love interest in the drama film Panic (2000). She earned critical praise for her performances as a ballet dancer in the drama film The Company (2003), for which she also produced and wrote the story, and as a femme fatale in the independent film When Will I Be Loved (2004). She made her West End theatre debut in a version of Arthur Miller's Resurrection Blues (2006) before announcing a hiatus from film, expressing her dissatisfaction with the roles she was being offered.

Campbell shifted her focus to television in the early 2010s, playing a recurring role on the drama thriller series Medium (2007), a philanthropist in the action series The Philanthropist (2009), and a journalist in the miniseries Titanic: Blood and Steel (2012). She was awarded the Canadian National Award of Excellence in 2016 and experienced a resurgence with the action blockbuster Skyscraper (2018). She has since played Laura Sobiech in the biographical drama Clouds (2020), a politician in the political thriller series House of Cards (2016–2017), and a criminal prosecutor in the crime drama series The Lincoln Lawyer (2022–present). She also served as an executive producer for the documentary Swan Song (2023).

== Screen credits ==
=== Film ===
Key
†	Denotes films that have not yet been released

Year	Title	Role	Notes
1993	The Dark	Jesse Donovan	
1994	Paint Cans	Tristesse	
1994	The Passion of John Ruskin	Effie Gray	Short film
1996	Love Child	Deidre	
1996	The Craft	Bonnie Harper	
1996	Scream	Sidney Prescott	
1997	Scream 2	Sidney Prescott	
1998	Wild Things	Suzie Marie Toller	
1998	54	Julie Black	
1998	Hairshirt	Renée Weber	Also producer
1998	The Lion King II: Simba's Pride	Kiara	Voice role; direct-to-video film
1999	Three to Tango	Amy Post	
2000	Drowning Mona	Ellen Rash	
2000	Panic	Sarah Cassidy	
2000	Scream 3	Sidney Prescott	
2002	Investigating Sex	Alice	
2003	Lost Junction	Missy Lofton	
2003	The Company	Loretta "Ry" Ryan	Also story writer & producer
2003	Blind Horizon	Chloe Richards	
2004	When Will I Be Loved	Vera Barrie	
2004	Churchill: The Hollywood Years	Princess Elizabeth	
2006	Relative Strangers	Ellen Minola	
2007	Partition	Margaret Stilwell	
2007	I Really Hate My Job	Abi	
2007	Closing the Ring	Marie Harris	
2008	Agent Crush	Cassie	Voice role
2011	Scream 4	Sidney Prescott	
2011	The Glass Man	Julie Pyrite	
2011	Still Screaming: The Ultimate Scary Movie Retrospective	Herself	Documentary film
2015	Walter	Allie	
2018	Skyscraper	Sarah Sawyer	
2018	Hot Air	Val Gannon	
2019	Castle in the Ground	Rebecca Fine	
2020	Clouds	Laura Sobiech	
2022	Scream	Sidney Prescott	
2023	Swan Song	–	Executive producer only
2026	Scream 7	Sidney Prescott-Evans	Also executive producer

=== Television ===
Year	Title	Role	Notes
1991	My Secret Identity	Student	Episode: "Pirate Radio"; uncredited role
1992	The Kids in the Hall	Laura Capelli	Episode: "#3.13"
1992-1993	Catwalk	Daisy McKenzie	Main role; 24 episodes
1994	I Know My Son is Alive	Beth	Television film
1994	The Forget-Me-Not Murders	Jess Foy	Television film
1994	Are You Afraid of the Dark?	Nonnie Walker	Episode: "Tale of the Dangerous Soup"
1994	Kung Fu: The Legend Continues	Trish Collins	Episode: "Kundela"
1994	Aventures dans le Grand Nord	Nepeese	Episode: "Bari"
1994-2000	Party of Five	Julia Salinger	Main role; 142 episodes
1995	MADtv	Julia Salinger	Episode: "#1.6"
1996	The Canterville Ghost	Virginia "Ginny" Otis	Television film
1997	Saturday Night Live	Herself (host)	Episode: "Neve Campbell / David Bowie"
2002	Last Call	Frances Kroll	Television film
2005	Reefer Madness	Miss Poppy	Television film
2007	Medium	Debra / P. D. McCall	Recurring role (season 3)
2008	Burn Up	Holly Dernay	Miniseries
2009	The Philanthropist	Olivia Maidstone	Main role
2009	Sea Wolf	Maud Brewster	Miniseries
2009	The Simpsons	Cassandra	Voice role; episode: "Rednecks and Broomsticks"
2011	Scream: The Inside Story	Herself	Documentary film
2012	Titanic: Blood and Steel	Joanna Yaegar	Miniseries
2012	Grey's Anatomy	Lizzie Shepherd	Episodes: "Love Turns You Upside Down" & "Run, Baby, Run"
2013	An Amish Murder	Kate Burkholder	Television film; also executive producer
2014	Mad Men	Lee Cabot	Episode: "Time Zones"
2015	Welcome to Sweden	Diane	Recurring role (season 2)
2015	Manhattan	Kitty Oppenheimer	Episodes: "The Threshold" & "Overlord"
2016–2017	House of Cards	LeAnn Harvey	Main role (seasons 4–5)
2022-present	The Lincoln Lawyer	Maggie McPherson	Main role
2022	Avalon	Nic Searcy	Unsold television pilot
2023	Twisted Metal	Raven	Episodes: "WLUDRV" & "SHNGRLA"
2026	Black Doves	Cecile Mason	Episodes: "1 episode"

=== Video games ===
- The Lion King: Simba's Mighty Adventure (2000), as Kiara

== Stage roles ==
Year	Production	Role	Theater	Ref.
1980s–1990s (Note: The dates of the musical's staging are unknown, but Rolling Stone reports over 800 performances in her teens.)	The Phantom of the Opera	Dancer	Canon Theatre	
2006	Resurrection Blues	Jeanine	Old Vic Theatre	
2006	Love Song	Molly	New Ambassadors Theatre	

== Awards and nominations ==
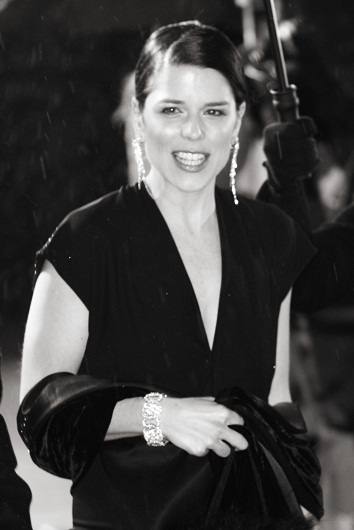
Campbell at the British Academy Film Awards in 2006

Awards and nominations received by Neve Campbell
Award	Year (Note: Refers to the year in which the ceremony was held. Where available, the year is linked to the specific ceremony's article.)	Category	Work	Result	Ref.
ACTRA Awards	2016	National Award of Excellence	—	Won	
Blockbuster Entertainment Awards	1998	Favourite Actress – Horror	Scream 2	Won	
Blockbuster Entertainment Awards	2001	Favourite Actress – Horror	Scream 3	Won	
Family Film Awards	1996	Best Actress – TV	The Canterville Ghost	Won	
Fangoria Chainsaw Awards	1997	Best Actress	Scream	Won	
Fangoria Chainsaw Awards	1998	Best Actress	Scream 2	Nominated	
Golden Nymph Awards	2012	Outstanding Actress in a Drama Series	Titanic: Blood and Steel	Nominated	
MTV Movie Awards	1997	Best Female Performance	Scream	Nominated	
MTV Movie Awards	1998	Best Female Performance	Scream 2	Won	
MTV Movie Awards	1999	Best Kiss (Note: Shared with Matt Dillon and Denise Richards.)	Wild Things	Nominated	
MTV Movie Awards	2000	Best Female Performance	Scream 3	Nominated	
Prism Awards	2003	Performance in TV Movie or Miniseries	Last Call	Won	
Saturn Awards	1997	Best Actress	Scream	Won	
Saturn Awards	1998	Best Actress	Scream 2	Nominated	
Scream Awards	2011	Best Horror Actress	Scream 4	Nominated	
Stinkers Bad Movie Awards	1998	Worst Supporting Actress	54, Wild Things	Nominated	
Teen Choice Awards	1999	Choice TV Actress	Party of Five	Nominated	
