= Black and White (soundtrack) =

Music from and Inspired by the Motion Picture Black and White

Soundtrack album by Various artists
- Released: March 28, 2000
- Recorded: 1999–2000
- Genre: Hip hop
- Length: 52:50
- Label: SRC; Loud; Columbia; Palm
- Producer: Oliver "Power" Grant (exec.); Brian Green; Carlos "Six July" Broady; D. Real; E-Swift; Lil Steve; Mark Batson; Mel-Man; One Eye; Pop; Prodigy; Rook; Sean Cane; The Infinite Arkatechz; DJ Wrecka

Professional ratings
Review scores
Source	Rating
AllMusic	2/5 stars

Music from and Inspired by the Motion Picture Black and White is the soundtrack to James Toback's 1999 drama film Black and White. It was released on March 28, 2000 through Loud Records, shortly before the film was released to theaters, and consists entirely of hip hop music. The album peaked at #124 on the Billboard 200 albums chart and at #43 on the Top R&B/Hip-Hop Albums chart in the United States.

== Track listing ==
No.	Title	Writer(s)	Producer(s)	Length
1.	"It's Not a Game" (performed by American Cream Team, Raekwon & RZA)	Bruce Mayfield; Delmar Coward; Jamel Cummings; Thaddaeus Birkett; Corey Woods; Robert Diggs; Collin Dewar; Michael Dewar	Collin "Jugrnaut" Dewar; Mike "Trauma" Dewar	4:57
2.	"Year 2000 (Remix)" (performed by Xzibit & Jonathan Davis)	Alvin Joiner; Melvin Bradford	Mel-Man	3:45
3.	"Don't Be a Follower" (performed by Prodigy)	Albert Johnson	Prodigy	3:15
4.	"Dramacide" (performed by The X-Ecutioners, Big Pun & Kool G Rap)	Christopher Rios; Nathaniel Wilson; Anthony Williams; Joel Wright; Robert Aguilar; Keith Bailey; Deleno Matthews	Deleno "Sean Cane" Matthews	3:39
5.	"Life's a Bitch" (performed by Everlast)	Erik Schrody; Eric Brooks	E-Swift	3:24
6.	"Wake Up" (performed by Raekwon)	Corey Woods	Carlos "Six July" Broady	4:07
7.	"Dem Crazy" (performed by Dead Prez & Stephen Marley)	Clayton Gavin; Lavonne Alford; Stephen Robert Nesta Marley	Mark Batson; Robert M. Rucker	4:55
8.	"Stand for Something" (performed by Chip Banks & Outlawz)	Bruce Mayfield; Mutah Beale; Rufus Cooper III; Donald Saunders	Donald "One Eye" Saunders	4:40
9.	"Middle Finger Attitude" (performed by American Cream Team)	Bruce Mayfield; Delmar Coward; Jamel Cummings; Thaddaeus Birkett	Wrecka	4:09
10.	"You'll Never Be Better Than Me (I'm That Shit)" (performed by Queen Pen & Joe Hooker)	Harve Pierre; Lynise Walters	Daniel "D. Real" Brown; Harve Pierre (co.); Queen Pen (co.)	4:35
11.	"You (Feel Good Remix)" (performed by Samuel Christian & Mos Def)	Samuel Christian; Dante Smith; Brian Green	Brian Green	3:46
12.	"You're a Big Girl Now" (performed by L.V.)	Lamar Bryant; Robert Douglas	Steve "Little Steve" Russell	4:14
13.	"Free" (performed by Michael Fredo)	Michael Fredo; Clayton Simmons; Naheem "Pop Holiday" Bowens; David McKenzie; Michael Harrison; David Paich; William Royce Scaggs	Vincent "Pop" Turner; Clayton Simmons (co.)	3:24
Total length:				52:50

== Chart history ==
Chart (2000)	Peak position
US Billboard 200	124
US Top R&B/Hip-Hop Albums (Billboard)	43
