= Immobilarity =

Studio album by Raekwon
- Released: November 16, 1999
- Recorded: 1998–1999
- Genre: Hip-hop
- Length: 65:12
- Labels: American Cream Team; Wu-Tang; Loud; Columbia
- Producers: Oli "Power" Grant (exec.); Raekwon (exec.); The Infinite Arkatechz; Triflyn; Naheen "Pop" Bowens; The Vo; Pete Rock; Carlos "Six July" Broady; DJ Devastator; DJ Devastate

Raekwon chronology
Only Built 4 Cuban Linx... (1995)	Immobilarity (1999)	The Lex Diamond Story (2003)

Wu-Tang Clan solo chronology
Golden Arms Redemption (1999)	Immobilarity (1999)	Supreme Clientele (2000)

Immobilarity is the second studio album by American rapper and Wu-Tang Clan-member Raekwon, as a follow-up to Only Built 4 Cuban Linx.... It was released in November 1999 on Wu-Tang Records, American Cream Team, Loud Records, and Columbia Records, and peaked in the Top 9 of the US album charts. The album was certified gold by the Recording Industry Association of America (RIAA) on December 20, 1999.

Professional ratings
Review scores
Source	Rating
AllMusic	3/5 stars
Chicago Sun-Times	1.5/4 stars
Robert Christgau	(choice cut)
Los Angeles Times	3/4 stars
PopMatters	(favorable)
RapReviews	7/10
Rolling Stone	3.5/5 stars
(The New) Rolling Stone Album Guide	1.5/5 stars
The Source	3.5/5 stars
USA Today	3.5/4 stars

== Background ==
Unlike the first album, it has no production input from the RZA, or any guest features from Ghostface Killah, for the album has its own theme. However, the album does feature Method Man and Masta Killa. Raekwon has stated that the title is an backronym for "I Move More Officially by Implementing Loyalty and Respect in the Youth". The album features affiliates American Cream Team, who would later become Ice Water.

== Track listing ==
Immobilarity track listing
No.	Title	Writer(s)	Producer(s)	Length
1.	"Intro"	Corey Woods; Michael Dewar; Collin Dewar	The Infinite Arkatechz	2:19
2.	"Yae Yo"	Woods; Carlos Broady	Carlos "Six-July" Broady	2:37
3.	"Casablanca"	Woods; Basil Poledouris	The Infinite Arkatechz	3:51
4.	"100 Rounds"	Woods; Sean Kelly	Triflyn	4:54
5.	"Real Life"	Woods; David Walker	DJ Devastator	3:02
6.	"Power" (featuring American Cream Team)	Woods; Kelly; Thaddaeus Birkett; Jamel Cummings; Bruce Mayfield; Delmar Coward	Triflyn	3:49
7.	"Skit 1"	Woods	DJ Devastate	1:05
8.	"All I Got Is You Pt. 2" (featuring Big Bub)	Woods; Frederick Lee Drakeford	Naheen "Pop" Bowens; The Vo	4:54
9.	"Jury" (featuring Kim Stephens)	Woods; M. Dewar; C. Dewar; Sean Baker	The Infinite Arkatechz	3:51
10.	"Fuck Them" (featuring Method Man)	Woods; Kelly; Clifford Smith, Jr.	Triflyn	3:55
11.	"Skit 2"	Woods	RZA	1:29
12.	"Live From New York"	Woods; M. Dewar; C. Dewar	The Infinite Arkatechz	3:26
13.	"My Favorite Dred"	Woods; Kelly	Triflyn	1:58
14.	"Friday"	Woods; Kelly	Triflyn	3:25
15.	"The Table" (featuring Masta Killa)	Woods; M. Dewar; C. Dewar; Jamel Irief	The Infinite Arkatechz	3:03
16.	"Sneakers"	Woods; Peter O. Phillips	Pete Rock	3:02
17.	"Raw" (featuring American Cream Team)	Woods; Naheen Bowens; Voe Harris; Birkett; Mayfield; Herb Lane; Keith Crier; Paul Service; Emanuel Rahiem LeBlanc	Naheen "Pop" Bowens; The Vo	3:07
18.	"Pop Shit"	Woods; Bowens; Michael Harrison	Naheen "Pop" Bowens; The Vo	3:18
19.	"Heart To Heart"	Woods; Ralph Anthony MacDonald; William Salter	Naheen "Pop" Bowens; The Vo	4:04
20.	"Forecast"	Woods; Kelly; Keith Sweat; Edward Theodore Riley	Triflyn	3:08
21.	"Outro"	Woods	RZA	1:09
Total length:				65:12

== Charts ==
=== Weekly charts ===
Chart (1999)	Peak position
US Billboard 200	9
US Top R&B/Hip-Hop Albums (Billboard)	2

=== Year-end charts ===
Chart (2000)	Position
US Top R&B/Hip-Hop Albums (Billboard)	81

== Certifications ==
Region	Certification	Certified units/sales
United States (RIAA)	Gold	500,000^{^}
^{^} Shipments figures based on certification alone.

== Notes ==
- Nathan Brackett, Christian Hoard (2004). The New Rolling Stone Album Guide. Completely Revised and Updated 4th Edition. Simon and Schuster. ISBN 0-7432-0169-8.
