= 2002 Los Angeles Film Critics Association Awards =

Annual US film awards ceremony

28th LAFCA Awards
- Date: December 15, 2002

Highlights
- Best Picture: About Schmidt

The 28th Los Angeles Film Critics Association Awards, given by the Los Angeles Film Critics Association (LAFCA) on 15 December 2002, honored the best in film for 2002.

== Winners ==
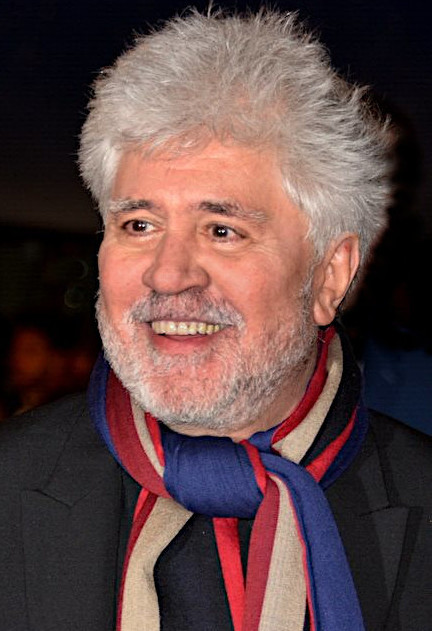
Pedro Almodóvar, Best Director winner

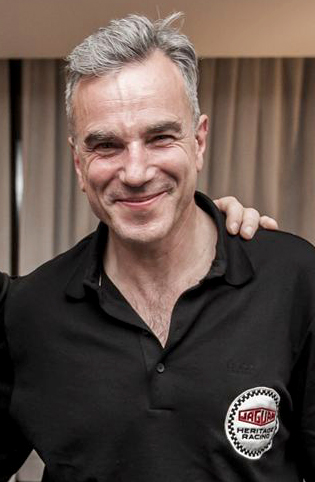
Daniel Day-Lewis, Best Actor co-winner

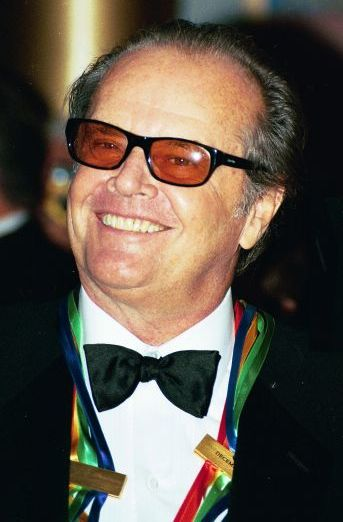
Jack Nicholson, Best Actor co-winner

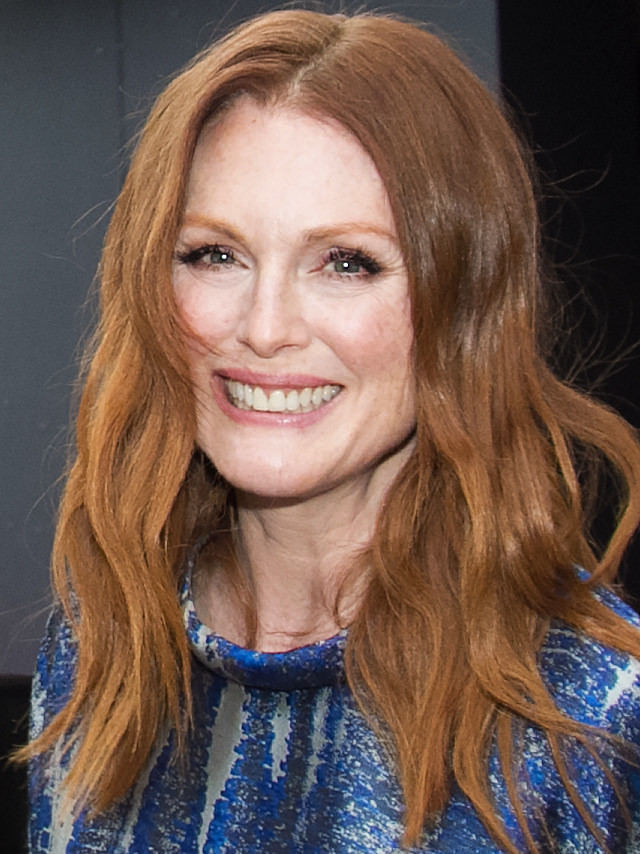
Julianne Moore, Best Actress winner

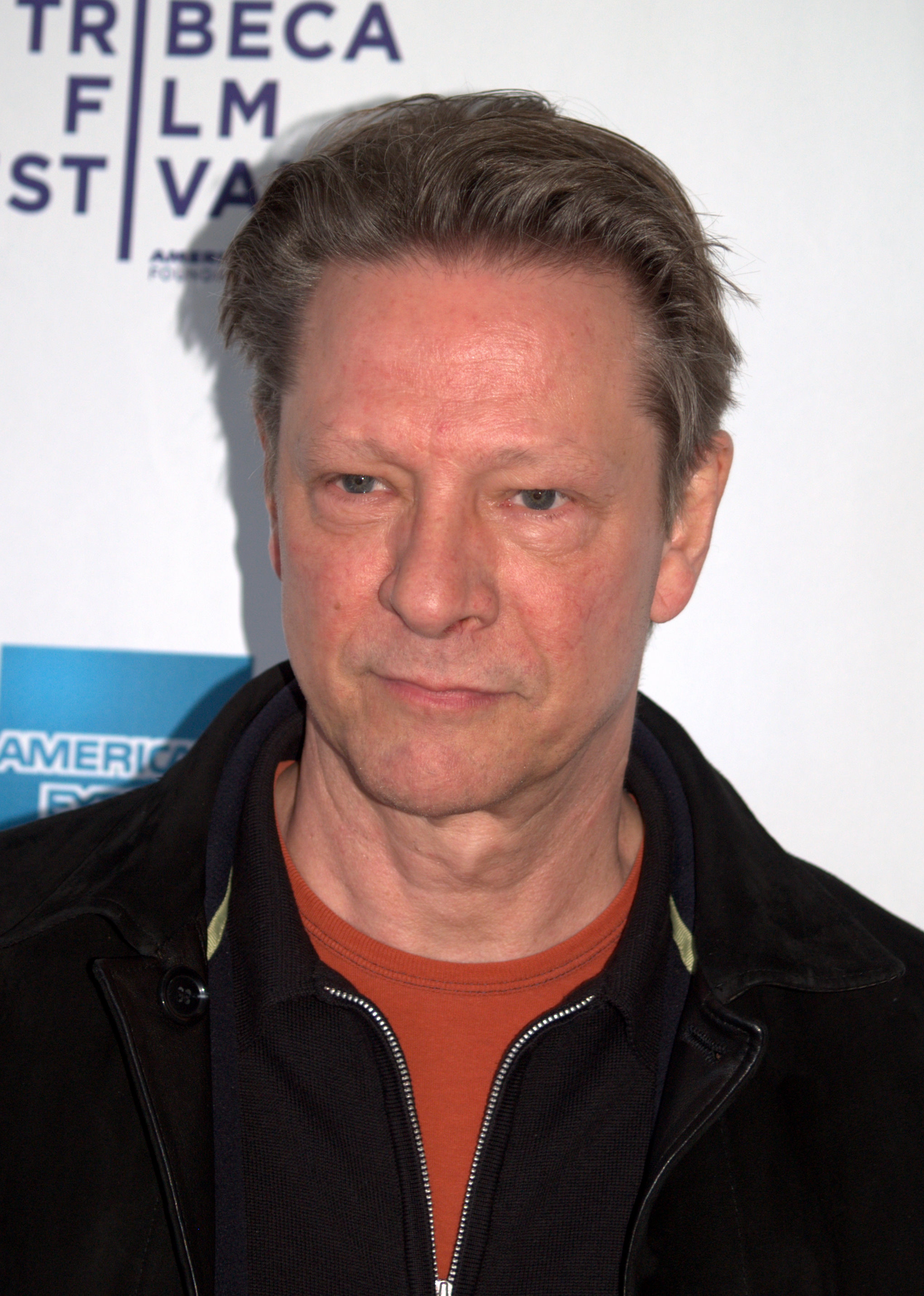
Chris Cooper, Best Supporting Actor winner

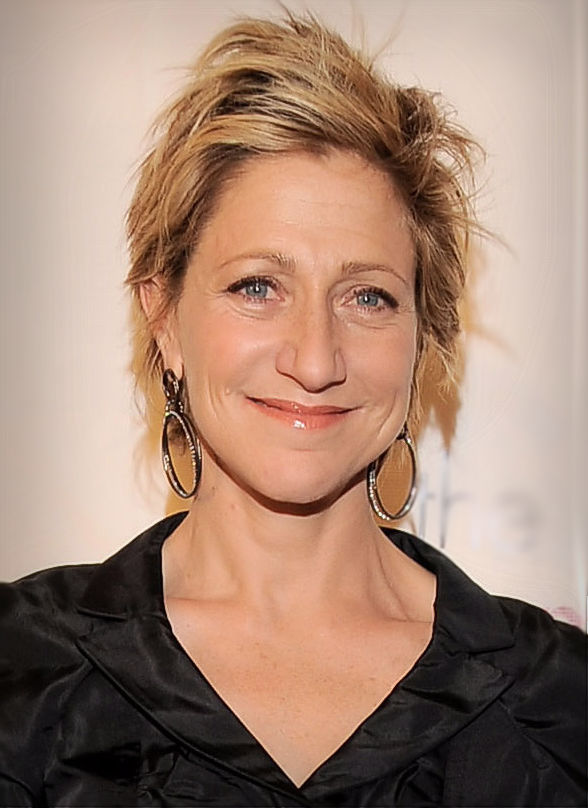
Edie Falco, Best Supporting Actress winner

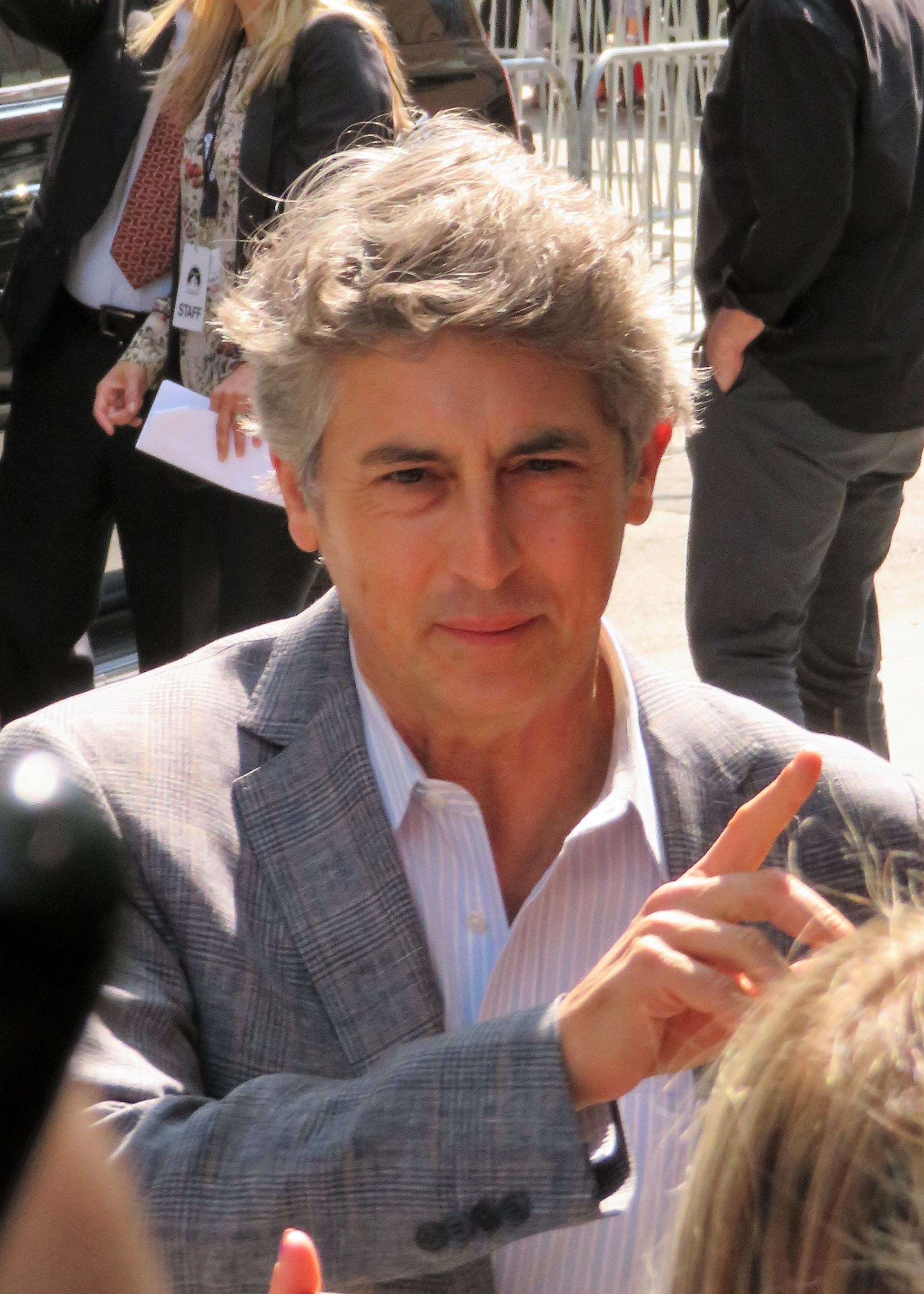
Alexander Payne, Best Screenplay co-winner

- Best Picture:
  - About Schmidt
  - Runner-up: Far from Heaven
- Best Director:
  - Pedro Almodóvar – Talk to Her (Hable con ella)
  - Runner-up: Todd Haynes – Far from Heaven
- Best Actor (TIE):
  - Daniel Day-Lewis – Gangs of New York
  - Jack Nicholson – About Schmidt
- Best Actress:
  - Julianne Moore – Far from Heaven and The Hours
  - Runner-up: Isabelle Huppert – The Piano Teacher (La pianiste)
- Best Supporting Actor:
  - Chris Cooper – Adaptation.
  - Runner-up: Christopher Walken – Catch Me If You Can
- Best Supporting Actress:
  - Edie Falco – Sunshine State
  - Runner-up: Kathy Bates – About Schmidt
- Best Screenplay:
  - Alexander Payne and Jim Taylor – About Schmidt
  - Runner-up: Charlie Kaufman and Donald Kaufman – Adaptation.
- Best Cinematography:
  - Edward Lachman – Far from Heaven
  - Runner-up: Conrad L. Hall – Road to Perdition
- Best Production Design:
  - Dante Ferretti – Gangs of New York
  - Runner-up: Mark Friedberg – Far from Heaven
- Best Music Score:
  - Elmer Bernstein – Far from Heaven
  - Runner-up: Philip Glass – The Hours
- Best Foreign Language Film:
  - Y Tu Mamá También • Mexico
  - Runner-up: Talk to Her (Hable con ella) • Spain
- Best Non-Fiction Film:
  - The Cockettes
  - Runner-up: Bowling for Columbine
- Best Animation:
  - Spirited Away (Sen to Chihiro no kamikakushi)
- The Douglas Edwards Experimental/Independent Film/Video Award:
  - Michael Snow – *Corpus Callosum
  - Kenneth Anger (for his body of work)
- New Generation Award:
  - Lynne Ramsay
- Career Achievement Award:
  - Arthur Penn
- Special Citation:
  - Lilo & Stitch for excellence in character design and animation.
