= Whiteboys (soundtrack) =

Whiteboys (Original Motion Picture Soundtrack)

Soundtrack album by Various artists
- Released: July 20, 1999
- Genre: Hip hop
- Length: 1:14:30
- Label: TVT Soundtrax
- Producer: 12 Gauge; Bucktown USA; Canibus; Ché Guevara; Daz Dillinger; DJ Hurricane; DJ Paul; DL; E-Z Rock; Freaky D; Infinite Arkatechz; Irv Gotti; Juicy J; Mark In The Dark; Mr. Lee; The WhoRidas; Thomas Hall; Trick Daddy; Ty Fyffe; Wildliffe Society

Professional ratings
Review scores
| Source | Rating |
|---|---|
| AllMusic | 2.5/5 stars |
| Entertainment Weekly | B+ |

Whiteboys (Original Motion Picture Soundtrack) is the soundtrack album to Marc Levin's 1999 comedy film Whiteboyz. It was released on July 20, 1999 via TVT Soundtrax and consists entirely of hip hop music. Production was handled by several record producers, including Arkatech Beatz, Che Pope, Daz Dillinger, DJ Hurricane, Irv Gotti, Ty Fyffe, DJ Paul and Juicy J. It features appearances from 12 Gauge, Big Pun, Big Tray Deee, Black Child, Buckshot, Canibus, Common, Do Or Die, Flipmode Squad, Gotta Boyz, Raekwon, Slick Rick, Smif-N-Wessun, Snoop Dogg, Soopafly, T-Bo, Tha Dogg Pound, The WhoRidas, Three 6 Mafia, Tommy Finger, Trick Daddy, Wildliffe Society, and 6430.

The album peaked at number 145 on the Billboard 200 and number 50 on the Top R&B/Hip-Hop Albums in the United States. Its single "Come Get It" reached number 73 on the Hot R&B/Hip-Hop Songs chart.

== Track listing ==
| No. | Title | Writer(s) | Producer(s) | Length |
|---|---|---|---|---|
| 1. | "Who Is a Thug" (performed by Big Punisher and 6430) | Christopher Rios; Bernard Wright; Lenny White | Ty Fyffe | 4:30 |
| 2. | "Come Get It" (performed by DJ Hurricane and Flipmode Squad) | Rashia Fisher; Roger McNair; Wayne Notise; Wendell Fite | DJ Hurricane | 4:24 |
| 3. | "Hell Ya" (performed by Soopafly, Daz Dillinger, Tray Deee and Kurupt) | Priest Brooks; Delmar Arnaud; Tracy Davis; Ricardo Brown | Daz Dillinger | 4:31 |
| 4. | "White Boyz" (performed by Snoop Dogg and T-Bo) | Calvin Broadus; Jason Thibeau; Marc D'Andrea | Mark In The Dark | 4:15 |
| 5. | "Respect Power" (performed by Raekwon) | Corey Woods; Ennio Morricone | Infinite Arkatechz | 3:37 |
| 6. | "Watch Who U Beef Wit" (performed by Canibus) | Germaine Williams; Salaam Remi; James Vanleer | Canibus | 4:24 |
| 7. | "Paper Chasers (Up North)" (performed by Tommy Finger) | Thomas Hall; C. Peterson | T. Hall | 4:40 |
| 8. | "Don't Come My Way" (performed by Slick Rick, Common and Renee Neufville) | Richard Martin Lloyd Walters; Lonnie Rashid Lynn; Che Pope | Ché Guevara | 4:50 |
| 9. | "Wanna Be's" (performed by Three 6 Mafia) | Darnell Carlton; Jordan Houston; Lola Mitchell; Patrick Houston; Paul Beauregard; Ricky Dunigan | DJ Paul; Juicy J | 4:49 |
| 10. | "Perfect Murda" (performed by Do Or Die) | Anthony Round; Darnell Smith | Mr. Lee | 4:31 |
| 11. | "Real Hustlers" (performed by Gotta Boyz) | Maurice Mathis; E. Williams; T. Curb | DJ E-Z Rock; Larry "Freaky-D" Dodson | 5:12 |
| 12. | "Get Rowdy" (performed by The WhoRidas) | Meiko Taylor; Hasaan Mahmoud; James Robinson | The WhoRidas | 4:43 |
| 13. | "For the Thugs" (performed by Trick Daddy) | Maurice Young | Trick Daddy | 4:12 |
| 14. | "Intrigued" (performed by Cocoa Brovaz and Buckshot) | Darrell Yates Jr.; Tekomin Williams; Kenyatta Blake; Joe Greene | Bucktown USA | 4:33 |
| 15. | "I Can Relate" (performed by Black Child) | Ramel Gill; Larry Ogletree; Irving Lorenzo | DL; Irv Gotti | 3:59 |
| 16. | "What's up Jack" (performed by Wildliffe Society) | Arnold Nevels; Chris Smith; Clifton Clincy; Freddie Young; Howard Fanning | Wildliffe Society | 4:21 |
| 17. | "Pimps VIP" (performed by 12 Gauge) | Isiah Pinkney | 12 Gauge | 2:59 |
| Total length: | | | | 1:14:30 |

== Personnel ==
- Vlado Meller – mastering
- Ezra Swerdlow – executive producer
- Henri Kessler – executive producer
- Marc Levin – executive producer
- Steve Gottlieb – executive producer
- Mark Ruberg – soundtrack coordinator
- Lisa West – soundtrack supervisor
- Patricia Joseph – soundtrack supervisor
- Jackie Sussman – soundtrack music clearance
- Russell Lefferts – soundtrack music clearance
- Stephanie Kika – soundtrack music clearance
- Benjamin Wheelock – art direction
- Arnold Katz – photography

== Charts ==
| Chart (1999) | Peak position |
|---|---|
| US Billboard 200 | 145 |
| US Top R&B Albums (Billboard) | 50 |
