= The Lex Diamond Story =

Studio album by Raekwon
- Released: December 16, 2003
- Recorded: 2001–2003
- Genre: Hip-hop
- Length: 59:08
- Labels: Ice Water; Universal
- Producers: Raekwon (exec.); RZA; Mizza; Crummie Beats; Mercury; Andy C; Smith Bros; Emile; Zephlon; Brutal Bill; DJ Khalil; EZ Elpee; Hangmen 3; Mike "Punch" Harper; Spontaneous

Raekwon chronology
Immobilarity (1999)	The Lex Diamond Story (2003)	Only Built 4 Cuban Linx... Pt. II (2009)

Wu-Tang Clan solo chronology
The Struggle (2003)	The Lex Diamond Story (2003)	The Pretty Toney Album (2004)

Professional ratings
Review scores
Source	Rating
AllMusic	3.5/5 stars
Blender	3/5 stars
Entertainment Weekly	B
RapReviews	8/10
Pitchfork	6.8/10
Rolling Stone	3/5 stars
Spin	B+
Stylus	F
USA Today	2.5/4 stars
Vibe	2.5/5 stars

The Lex Diamond Story is the third studio album by American rapper and Wu-Tang Clan member Raekwon. It was released on December 16, 2003, on his Ice Water Inc. label through Universal Records. The album features contributions from Wu-Tang Clan members Ghostface Killah, Method Man, Masta Killa, Inspectah Deck, and Cappadonna, with production by several hip-hop producers, including RZA, Emile and DJ Khalil.

== Track listing ==
No.	Title	Writer(s)	Producer(s)	Length
1.	"The Lex Diamond Intro"	Corey Woods	Crummie Beats	1:03
2.	"Pit Bull Fights" (featuring Polite)	Woods; Jason Bratcher	Mizza	2:02
3.	"Hitman Salary (Skit)"	Woods	Zephlon	0:10
4.	"King of Kings" (featuring Havoc)	Woods; Kejuan Waliek Muchita	Crummie Beats	3:50
5.	"Missing Watch" (featuring Ghostface Killah and Polite)	Woods; Dennis David Coles; Bratcher	Mizza	3:25
6.	"All Over Again"	Woods	Mercury	3:34
7.	"Clientele Kidd" (featuring Fat Joe, Ghostface Killah, and Polite)	Woods; Joseph Antonio Cartagena; Coles; Bratcher	Andy C	3:53
8.	"Smith Bros"	Woods	Smith Bros.	4:16
9.	"Restaurant (Skit)"	Woods	Mercury	2:08
10.	"Robbery" (featuring Ice Water Inc.)	Woods	Emile	3:50
11.	"Fuck You (Skit)"	Woods	RZA	0:25
12.	"Pa-Blow Escablow" (featuring Polite)	Woods; Bratcher	Zephlon	3:09
13.	"Musketeers of Pig Alley" (featuring Masta Killa and Inspectah Deck)	Woods; Jamel Irief; Jason Richard Hunter	Brutal Bill	3:06
14.	"Ice Cream Pt. 2" (featuring Method Man and Cappadonna)	Woods; Clifford Smith, Jr.; Darryl Hill	DJ Khalil	3:44
15.	"The Hood" (featuring Tiffany Villarreal)	Woods; Tiffany Villarreal	EZ Elpee	3:48
16.	"Wild Chimpanzees (Skit)"	Woods	Smith Bros.	1:59
17.	"Planet of the Apes" (featuring Capone, Sheek Louch, and Polite)	Woods; Kiam Akasi Holley; Sean Divine Jacobs; Bratcher	Hangmen 3	4:28
18.	"Wild in da Club" (featuring MC Ultra and Ice Water Inc.)	Woods	Punch	4:05
19.	"Once Upon a Time" (featuring Tekitha)	Woods; Tekitha Washington	Spontaneous	5:05
20.	"Lex Diamond Story Outro"	Woods	RZA	1:18
Total length:				59:08

== Charts ==
Chart (2003)	Peak position
US Billboard 200	102
US Top R&B/Hip-Hop Albums (Billboard)	18

== Notes ==
- Nathan Brackett, Christian Hoard (2004). The New Rolling Stone Album Guide. Completely Revised and Updated 4th Edition. Simon and Schuster. ISBN 0-7432-0169-8.
