= Top 5 Dead or Alive =

Studio album by Jadakiss
- Released: November 20, 2015
- Recorded: 2012–2015
- Genre: Hip hop
- Length: 60:01
- Labels: SoRaspy; D-Block; Ruff Ryders; Def Jam
- Producers: Jason "Jadakiss" Philips (exec.); Jay "Icepick" Jackson (exec.); Akon; Arkatech Beatz; Bangladesh; Beat Butcha; Buda & Grandz; Dane Beats; Just Blaze; Lee on the Beats; Mark Batson; Pitchshifters; POSTA; Rico Beats; Scram Jones; Swizz Beatz; Ty Fyffe

Jadakiss chronology
| The Last Kiss (2009) | Top 5 Dead or Alive (2015) | Friday on Elm Street (2017) |

Singles from Top 5 Dead or Alive
- 1. "Jason" Released: October 16, 2015; 2. "Ain't Nothin New" Released: October 30, 2015

Top 5 Dead or Alive is the fourth studio album by American hip hop recording artist Jadakiss. The album was released on November 20, 2015, by SoRaspy, D-Block Records, Ruff Ryders Entertainment, and Def Jam Recordings. The album features guest appearances from Akon, Future, Jeezy, Lil Wayne, Ne-Yo, Nas, Nipsey Hussle, Styles P, Puff Daddy, Sheek Louch, Swizz Beatz, Young Adz and Young Buck. Jadakiss and his team worked closely with Artist Matt Senna to create the album artwork inspired by the idea that Jadakiss was being inducted into the unofficial hall of fame.

== Background ==
In May 2010, he spoke about the progress of the album, saying: "I got about three good ones. Not even recorded. I got probably two verses off each song. Maybe four good ones. [DJ Drama] sent me something. I’m doing real careful selection on production on this project…Even my street joints, even if it’s a symphony. If every verse got 75 curses in it, I want the production to be big…I was gonna switch the name up. I put it on Twitter, I put it on every website you can imagine, and that came back unanimous. So Top Five, Dead or Alive it is, baby…It’s Def Jam, Roc-A-Fella, Ruff Ryders, D-Block, Aphilliates, Green Lantern, a couple of other white guys [releasing it.] You know how this game is. Everybody is in the pot. But it’s enough money for everybody."

In December 2012, he explained that he was halfway done recording the album, saying: "It's coming baby, first quarter. Anywhere, February, March, April... You know, somewhere around there where it feels right,. It's halfway finished now. When I finish this tour, I'll go home and finish the rest of it and then we strategize the marketing plan and get that thing out to the people."

== Singles ==
On October 16, 2015, the album's first single "Jason" featuring Swizz Beatz was released. On October 30, 2015, the album's second single "Ain't Nothin New" featuring Ne-Yo and Nipsey Hussle was released.

== Critical reception ==
Professional ratings
Aggregate scores
| Source | Rating |
|---|---|
| Metacritic | 73/100 |
Review scores
| Source | Rating |
| AllMusic | 4/5 stars |
| HipHopDX | 4/5 stars |
| Pitchfork Media | 5.5/10 |
| RapReviews | 7/10 |

Top 5 Dead or Alive received generally positive reviews from music critics. At Metacritic, which assigns a normalized rating out of 100 to reviews from mainstream critics, the album received an average score of 73, based on 5 reviews, which indicates "generally favorable reviews". David Jeffries of AllMusic said, "A top-notch Lil Wayne appearance plus an unofficial Lox reunion with Styles P and Sheek Louch guesting on the LP help put this one through the uprights, giving veteran Jada one of his best and most ambitious showcases to date." Scott Glaysher of HipHopDX said, "After the first initial play through, this album definitely translates as Jadakiss’ most celebratory to date. The beats are more grandiose, less gutter horror story and more hustler's celebration. The whole theme plays out like his very own victory lap."

== Commercial performance ==
In the United States, the album debuted at number 4 on the Billboard 200, selling 60,000 copies in its first week.

== Track listing ==
| No. | Title | Writer(s) | Producer(s) | Length |
|---|---|---|---|---|
| 1. | "First 48 (Intro)" | Jason Phillips; Tyrone Fyffe; Lauren Seymour; Angela Winbush | Ty Fyffe | 3:23 |
| 2. | "Shop Talk (skit)" | Phillips; Sedgewick Robinson; Kristian Smith; Keith Wheeler | | 0:56 |
| 3. | "You Don't Eat" (featuring Puff Daddy) | Phillips; Marc Anthony; Kaseem Dean; Sam Debbie; Bjoern Djupstroem; Bilal Hajji; Achraf Jannusi; Nadir Khayat; Alex Papaconstantinou; Seymour | Swizz Beatz; Avenue Beatz | 3:00 |
| 4. | "You Can See" (featuring Future) | Phillips; Jamie Jason Daley; Khaled Khaled; Anthony Lee Norris; Seymour; Nayvadius Wilburn | Lee on the Beats; Dane Beats; DJ Khaled | 3:15 |
| 5. | "Y. O. (Youthful Offenders)" (featuring Akon) | Phillips; Seymour; Aliaune Thiam | Akon | 3:52 |
| 6. | "Jason" (featuring Swizz Beatz) | Phillips; Dean; Mark Batson; Seymour | Swizz Beatz; Batson | 4:06 |
| 7. | "Kill" (featuring Lil Wayne) | Phillips; Dwayne Carter, Jr.; Shondrae Crawford; Seymour | Bangladesh | 2:48 |
| 8. | "Man in the Mirror" | Phillips; Joseph Acosta; Seymour; Paris Wells | Pav Bundy; Swerv | 3:58 |
| 9. | "Synergy" (featuring Styles P) | Phillips; Donald Blackman; Justin Smith; David Styles | Just Blaze | 3:51 |
| 10. | "Ain't Nothin New" (featuring Ne-Yo and Nipsey Hussle) | Phillips; Ermias Asghedom; Eliot Dubock; Dan Garcia; Seymour; Shaffer Smith; Francis Ubiera | Buda & Grandz; Beat Butcha | 3:46 |
| 11. | "So High" (featuring Wiz Khalifa) | Phillips; Ricardo Lamarre; Seymour; Cameron Thomaz | Rico Beats | 3:20 |
| 12. | "Ahaa Interview (skit)" | Phillips; Anthony Donahue; James D. Fowler; Seymour | | 1:32 |
| 13. | "Critical" (featuring Jeezy) | Phillips; Jay Jenkins; Lamarre | Rico Beats | 3:14 |
| 14. | "Confetti (skit)" (featuring Young Adz) | Phillips; Daniel Morris; Bradley Myers; Seymour; Adam Williams | Bespoke | 2:27 |
| 15. | "Cutlass" (featuring EX.OD.US) | Phillips; Jesus Hernandez; Anthony Graham; Stephen Nicholson; Seymour; D'angelo Taylor-Ricard | POSTA; Stevie Nick XX^{[a]} | 3:44 |
| 16. | "Realest in the Game" (featuring Young Buck and Sheek Louch) | Phillips; Thomas J. Bergersen; David Darnell Brown; Collin Dewar; Michael Dewar; Sean Jacobs; Seymour | Arkatech Beatz | 5:42 |
| 17. | "Rain" (featuring Nas and Styles P) | Phillips; Nasir Jones; Styles; Seymour; Linda Perhacs; Marc Shemer | Scram Jones | 4:54 |
| 18. | "One More Mile to Go" | Phillips; Mads Møller; Thor Nørgaard; Seymour | Pitchshifters | 3:42 |
| Total length: | | | | 60:01 |

Best Buy bonus track
| No. | Title | Writer(s) | Producer(s) | Length |
|---|---|---|---|---|
| 19. | "Baby" (featuring Dyce Payne) | Phillips; Shemer; Dave Hall; Kenny Greene | Scram Jones | 2:57 |

Notes

- ^{^[a]} signifies a co-producer

== Charts ==
=== Weekly charts ===
| Chart (2015) | Peak position |
|---|---|
| US Billboard 200 | 4 |
| US Top R&B/Hip-Hop Albums (Billboard) | 1 |

=== Year-end charts ===
| Chart (2016) | Position |
|---|---|
| US Top R&B/Hip-Hop Albums (Billboard) | 27 |
