= Whoridin' =

Studio album by The WhoRidas
- Released: August 19, 1997
- Recorded: 1995–1997
- Studio: Paramount Studios (Los Angeles, CA); Infinite Studios (Alameda, CA)
- Genre: Hip hop
- Length: 1:01:20
- Label: Delicious Vinyl
- Producer: Big Nous; Bob Durham; Daz Dillinger; DJ Jay-Z; Don Reed; Dotrix 4000; G-Man Stan; J-Cutt; J Groove; Merg One; Shock G
- Compiler: Jim Ervin; Mike Tritter

The WhoRidas chronology
Whoridin' (1997)	High Times (1999)

Singles from Whoridin'
- 1. "Shot Callin' & Big Ballin'" Released: June 25, 1996; 2. "Talkin' Bout Bank" Released: May 1997

Professional ratings
Review scores
Source	Rating
AllMusic	4/5 stars
RapReviews	7.5/10
The Source	3.5/5 stars

Whoridin' is the debut studio album by American hip hop duo The WhoRidas. It was released on August 19, 1997 via Southpaw Records/Delicious Vinyl. Production was handled by Big Nous, Bob Durham, DJ Jay-Z, Dotrix 4000, J-Cutt, J Groove, Daz Dillinger, Don Reed, G-Man Stan, Merg One and Shock G, with Orlando Aguillen, Saafir and Sleuth Productions serving as executive producers.

== Commercial success ==
The album peaked at number 39 on the Top R&B/Hip-Hop Albums and number 31 on the Heatseekers Albums in the United States. It was supported with two singles "Shot Callin' & Big Ballin'" and "Talkin' Bout Bank", and two promotional singles "Keep It Goin'" and "Never Heard". Its lead single, "Shot Callin' & Big Ballin'", made it to No. 21 on the Bubbling Under Hot 100 and No. 31 on the Hot Rap Songs. The second single off of the album, "Talkin' Bout Bank", reached No. 2 on the Bubbling Under Hot 100, No. 54 on the Hot R&B/Hip-Hop Songs, No. 8 on the Hot Rap Songs, and No. 26 on the Hot R&B/Hip-Hop Singles Sales.

== Track listing ==
No.	Title	Writer(s)	Producer(s)	Length
1.	"Never Heard"	Hassan N. Mahmoud; Miekeo J. Taylor; Delmar Arnaud	Daz Dillinger	4:39
2.	"Pounds, Ki's and Oz's"	H. Mahmoud; Taylor	Dotrix 4000	3:46
3.	"Taxin'"	H. Mahmoud; A. Mahmoud; Taylor	J Groove	3:30
4.	"Shot Callin' & Big Ballin'"	H. Mahmoud; Taylor; Reggie Gibson; Vaughan Mason; Gregory Bufford; Jerome Bell	Merg 1	3:43
5.	"Keep It Goin'"	H. Mahmoud; Taylor; Robert Lester Durham	Bob Durham	4:37
6.	"Whoridin'"	H. Mahmoud; Gibson; Taylor	Big Nous	3:03
7.	"Talkin' Bout Bank" (Funk Mode Mix)	H. Mahmoud; Taylor; Durham; Don Joseph Reed	Bob Durham; Don Reed	3:42
8.	"Till the Wheels Fall Off"	A. Mahmoud; H. Mahmoud; Taylor; J. Stockstill; Armand Trammell	J-Z	3:59
9.	"Westbound Campaign"	H. Mahmoud; Taylor; Jimmy Robinson	J-Cutt	3:13
10.	"Off the Ringa!"	H. Mahmoud; Taylor; Stan Keith	G-Man Stan	4:07
11.	"Down on My Luck"	H. Mahmoud; Taylor	Dotrix 4000	4:01
12.	"World Wide Whoride"	H. Mahmoud; Taylor; Robinson	J-Cutt	3:40
13.	"Stackin $'s"	H. Mahmoud; Taylor; Trammell	Big Nous	3:35
14.	"True Playas" (Remix)	H. Mahmoud; Taylor; Gregory Jacobs	Shock G	5:21
15.	"Bumpin'"	H. Mahmoud	J-Z	3:32
16.	"Pull Off That Whoride"	H. Mahmoud; Taylor	J Groove	3:51
Total length:				1:01:20

Sample credits

- Track 4 contains samples of "Bounce, Rock, Skate, Roll" as recorded by Vaughan Mason & Crew.

== Personnel ==
- Hasaan N. "King Saan" Mahmoud — vocals
- Meikeo J. "Mr. Taylor" Taylor — vocals
- Priest "Soopafly" Brooks — keyboards & mixing (track 1)
- "G-Man" Stan Keith — guitar (tracks: 2, 10), producer (track 10), mixing (tracks: 2, 3, 6, 8-13, 15, 16)
- Delmar "Daz Dillinger" Arnaud — producer & mixing (track 1)
- Dontrell "Dotrix 4000" Mayfield — producer (tracks: 2, 11)
- James "J Groove" Carson — producer & mixing (tracks: 3, 16)
- Merg One — producer & mixing (track 4)
- Bob Durham — producer & mixing (tracks: 5, 7)
- Ty "Big Nous" Alston — producer & mixing (tracks: 6, 13)
- Don Reed — producer (track 7), mixing (tracks: 5, 7)
- Jeremy "Jay-Z" Jackson — producer (tracks: 8, 15)
- Jimmy "J-Cutt" Robinson — producer & mixing (tracks: 9, 12)
- Gregory "Shock G" Jacobs — producer (track 14)
- Crayge Lindesay — mixing (track 4)
- Michael Denten — mixing (track 14)
- Orlando Aguillen — executive producer
- Reggie "Saafir" Gibson — executive producer
- Neil "Sleuth" Johnson — executive producer
- Jim Ervin — compiler, editing
- Mike Tritter — compiler, editing
- Truly Rain — art direction
- Brian "B+" Cross — photography

== Charts ==
Chart (1997–98)	Peak position
US Top R&B/Hip-Hop Albums (Billboard)	39
US Heatseekers Albums (Billboard)	31
