= Jacqueline Buckingham =

American actress and entrepreneur

- Born: Jacqueline Elaine Buckingham
- Education: Emory University; University of Toronto (B.A.)
- Occupations: Actress, entrepreneur
- Years active: 1995–present
- Spouse: Maxwell L. Anderson (married 1995-2013, 2013-2016)
- Children: 2
- Website: msbuckingham.com

Jacqueline Buckingham (born Jacqueline Elaine Buckingham) is an American actress and entrepreneur. She is best known for her supporting roles in Half-Baked, Intimate affairs, and A Touch of Fate, and her lead role in the movie Sleepless Nights. In addition to her acting career, she has worked in art consulting and founded initiatives related to women's health and advocacy. A society fixture in New York, she has also lived in Houston, Atlanta, Toronto, and Indianapolis.

== Early life ==
Jacqueline Elaine Buckingham is the daughter of Dr. and Mrs. John Eric Bodin. She was raised in Houston, Texas. She graduated from Kingwood High School in 1993 and was crowned Miss Houston Teen USA in 1992. She attended Emory University.

== Career ==
Buckingham began her career working at Sotheby’s in New York and Toronto and at the Chassie Post Gallery in Atlanta before transitioning into acting. Buckingham began her acting career at the Equity Showcase Theatre in Toronto. Since then, she has had numerous roles in films, such as Half-Baked, The Gypsy Years, and *Corpus Callosum. She played the supporting role of "Linda" in the Alan Rudolph film Intimate affairs, starring Nick Nolte and Tuesday Weld; and she was "Betsy Kline" in the movie A Touch of Fate, starring Teri Hatcher.

Buckingham appeared as a special guest star, "Sherry," in the NBC's Ed (a hit TV series) and, in the role of "Marie," on the CBS series Hack (American TV series). She also made regular, but uncredited, appearances carrying in the mailbag on the Late Show with David Letterman. In As the World Turns on CBS, she played "Glenda Corcoran" and, in the "Ill-Conceived" episode of Law & Order on NBC, she guest-starred in the lead role of "Helene Zachary."

Buckingham hosted a documentary for OLN (now "Bravo") and played the role of Tiffany in Jesus, Mary and Joey with Olympia Dukakis and Jennifer Esposito, and appeared opposite Minnie Driver in Portrait, a short feature that aired on amazon.com.

In Los Angeles in 2004, Buckingham founded Design & Style Consulting LLC, a business focused on the art and fashion needs of various corporate and individual clients.

After relocating with her family to Indianapolis, Indiana, she created photosforhealth.com, a company that puts photographs on hospital walls. Her efforts initially provoked some controversy, as some members of the local art community claimed she was displacing the work of professional artists.

In 2008, she launched Style Meets Life, a column and website assisting women with choices regarding personal presentation and fashion.

She has also served as director of the Wellness Institute at the Crow Collection of Asian Art in Dallas.

In 2018, Buckingham created The Box, a series of short films that she wrote, directed, produced, and starred in.

== Entrepreneurship and advocacy ==
Buckingham has founded several initiatives related to women's health and advocacy, including HPH Global Inc. and the Women's Intimate and Sexual Health (W.I.S.H.) Foundation.

She also founded Huge Pussy, a product line associated with women's advocacy initiatives, which has supported organizations including Planned Parenthood, The Pink Fund, and NARAL.

In 2023, she launched the podcast Cliterology (later renamed MENO), focused on women's health topics.

She is the founder of MENO, a platform focused on menopause and women's health education.

== Personal life ==
In 1995, Buckingham married museum director Maxwell L. Anderson. They were briefly divorced in 2013 before announcing their re-marriage three months later. They are now no longer married. She and Anderson have two children, Chase and Devon. As the first lady of several art museums, she made a name for herself in the New York Society circuit, culminating in 2003 in a two-page profile in W. A year after the attack on the World Trade Center, her fashion sense was cited in the pages of The New York Times as embodying glamour's return.

The New York Times subsequently reported about her to illustrate the challenges of recruiting spouses as part of professional recruitment for museum jobs. While living in Indiana, she undertook an expensive interior redesign of the 13,000 sq ft (1,200 m^{2}) official residence of the Indianapolis Museum of Art.
