= Neve Campbell =

Canadian actress (born 1973)

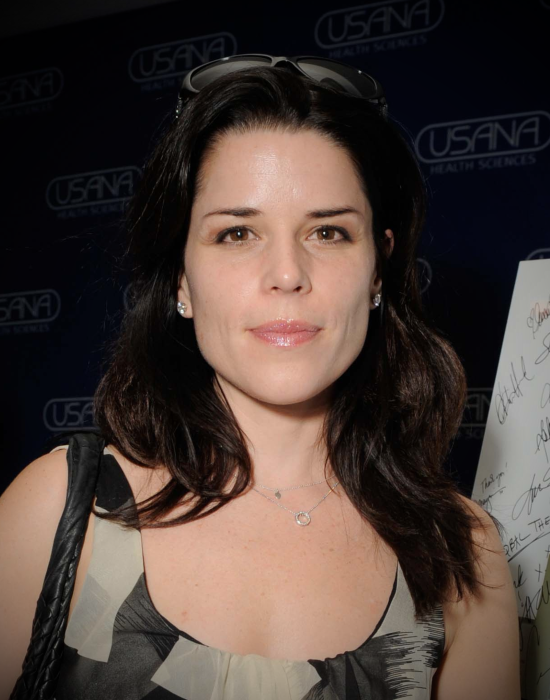
- Campbell in 2010
- Born: Neve Adrianne Campbell; October 3, 1973 (age 53); Guelph, Ontario, Canada
- Occupation: Actress
- Years active: 1989–present
- Works: Full list
- Spouses: Jeff Colt (m. 1995; div. 1998); John Light (m. 2007; div. 2011)
- Partner: JJ Feild (2011–present)
- Children: 2
- Relatives: Christian Campbell (brother); America Olivo (sister-in-law)

Neve Adrianne Campbell (/ˈnɛv/; born October 3, 1973) is a Canadian actress. Having amassed several credits and accolades over three decades, she emerged as a scream queen in the late 1990s for starring in horror films. She has also appeared in Canadian and American television, blockbusters and independent features.

Following a series of minor credits, Campbell had starring roles in the drama series Catwalk (1992–1993) and the television film The Canterville Ghost (1996). She relocated to the United States and starred as Julia Salinger in the Fox teen drama series Party of Five (1994–2000), which became her breakthrough role. She rose to international prominence for her leading role as Sidney Prescott in the slasher film Scream (1996), which spawned the Scream franchise, in which she reprised her role in each film except the sixth. She also headlined the horror film The Craft (1996), the thriller film Wild Things (1998), and the drama film Panic (2000). She earned critical praise for the drama film The Company (2003), for which she also wrote the story and served as a producer, and the independent film When Will I Be Loved (2004).

Campbell shifted her focus to television in the late 2000s, as she was dissatisfied with the film roles she was offered. She played a recurring role on the NBC drama thriller series Medium (2007) and starring roles on the action series The Philanthropist (2009) and the miniseries Titanic: Blood and Steel (2012). She returned to mainstream film with the action thriller Skyscraper (2018) and has since starred in the biographical drama Clouds (2020), the political thriller series House of Cards (2016–2017) and the crime drama series The Lincoln Lawyer (2022–present).

== Early life and education ==
Neve Adrianne Campbell was born on October 3, 1973, in Guelph, Ontario, Canada. Campbell's Dutch mother, Marnie (née Neve), is a yoga instructor and psychologist from Amsterdam. Her Scottish father, Gerry Campbell, immigrated to Canada from Glasgow, Scotland, and taught high school drama classes at Lorne Park Secondary School in Mississauga, Ontario. Campbell's maternal grandparents ran a theatre company in the Netherlands, and her paternal grandparents were also performers. Campbell has an older brother, Christian Campbell, and two younger half-brothers, Alex Campbell and Damian McDonald. Her parents divorced when she was two.

At age six, she saw a performance of The Nutcracker and decided she wanted to take ballet classes, enrolling at the Erinvale School of Dance. She later moved into residence at the National Ballet School of Canada, training there and appearing in performances of The Nutcracker and Sleeping Beauty. After accumulating numerous dance-related injuries, she retired from ballet and took up acting at age 15, performing in The Phantom of the Opera at the Canon Theatre in Toronto while attending John F. Ross Collegiate Vocational Institute in Guelph, where she trained in acting and worked in theatre.

== Career ==
=== Early work ===
Campbell's early work included a 1980s Eaton's department store Christmas commercial and a 1991 Coca-Cola commercial; she promoted Coca Cola's sponsorship on Bryan Adams's Waking Up the Nation Tour (1991–1992). She made an uncredited cameo appearance on the series My Secret Identity in 1991. The next year, she played the minor role of Laura Capelli on an episode of The Kids in the Hall and landed her first starring role as Daisy in the Canadian drama series Catwalk. She subsequently made several guest appearances on various Canadian television shows, such as Are You Afraid of the Dark? and Kung Fu: The Legend Continues, both occurring in 1994.

=== 1990s ===
With a desire to perform in Hollywood, Campbell went to Los Angeles to find a talent manager to represent her and ended up going on several auditions while she was doing so. One of these auditions was for Party of Five, which cast her in the role of orphaned teenager Julia Salinger, whereupon Campbell permanently relocated to the United States to play the role. Party of Five premiered in 1994 and went on to receive critical acclaim, winning the Golden Globe Award for Best Drama in 1996. Campbell's performance on the series was lauded by critics and audiences alike; the series is considered her breakthrough role. After appearing on Party of Five for six seasons, she did not renew her contract for a seventh season so she could pursue film work, which led to the series' end in 2000.

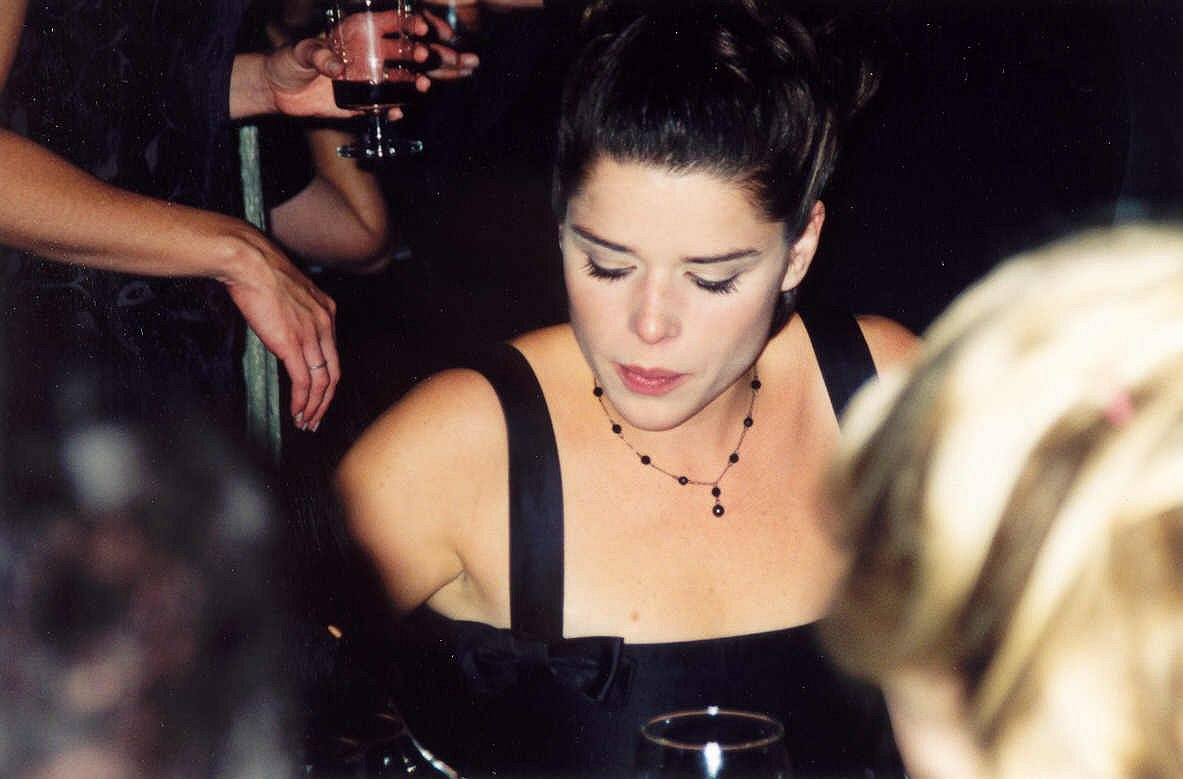
Campbell attending the 1997 Primetime Emmy Awards

Campbell's first widely released film was The Craft (1996). The movie was a surprise success, earning $55 million against a budget of $15 million. Her work in The Craft was noticed by director Wes Craven, who specifically asked her to audition for the role of Sidney Prescott in 1996's Scream, believing that the actress could be "innocent", but also handle herself once emotional and physical conflicts arose. Scream was released to major commercial and critical success, earning over $173 million at the worldwide box office which made it the highest-grossing slasher film until the release of Halloween in 2018. Her performance received significant critical praise. Variety magazine described Campbell as "charismatic", and the Los Angeles Times called both her acting and the character "iconic". For her performance, she won the Fangoria Chainsaw Award for Best Actress and the Saturn Award for Best Actress.

In 1997, Campbell reprised the role of Sidney in Scream 2, which earned over $170 million and, like the first installment, was critically acclaimed. Patrick Mullen of Medium website stated that "I've always appreciated Neve Campbell in the lead just as much. She plays the role so straight while everyone else winks at the camera. It may sound like it wouldn't work, but it actually does. Sidney Prescott is a more compelling heroine than you usually get in a horror movie." She won the MTV Movie Award for Best Female Performance for her work in Scream 2.

In 1998, Campbell had roles in Hairshirt and 54 and voiced Kiara in the Disney animated musical film The Lion King II: Simba's Pride. She also appeared in the erotic thriller film Wild Things. She took on the role in Wild Things to avoid being typecast based on her Party of Five role. Glamour praised Campbell's character in the film, describing it as one of "the most well-rounded, fascinating, and exciting characters to ever grace the screen". In 2022, a retrospective review of Wild Things in The New York Times written by Abbey Bender described her character as a "femme fatale" and called Campbell's acting a "calculated performance of self-assured femininity inspires fear, arousal and awe in equal measure".

=== 2000s ===
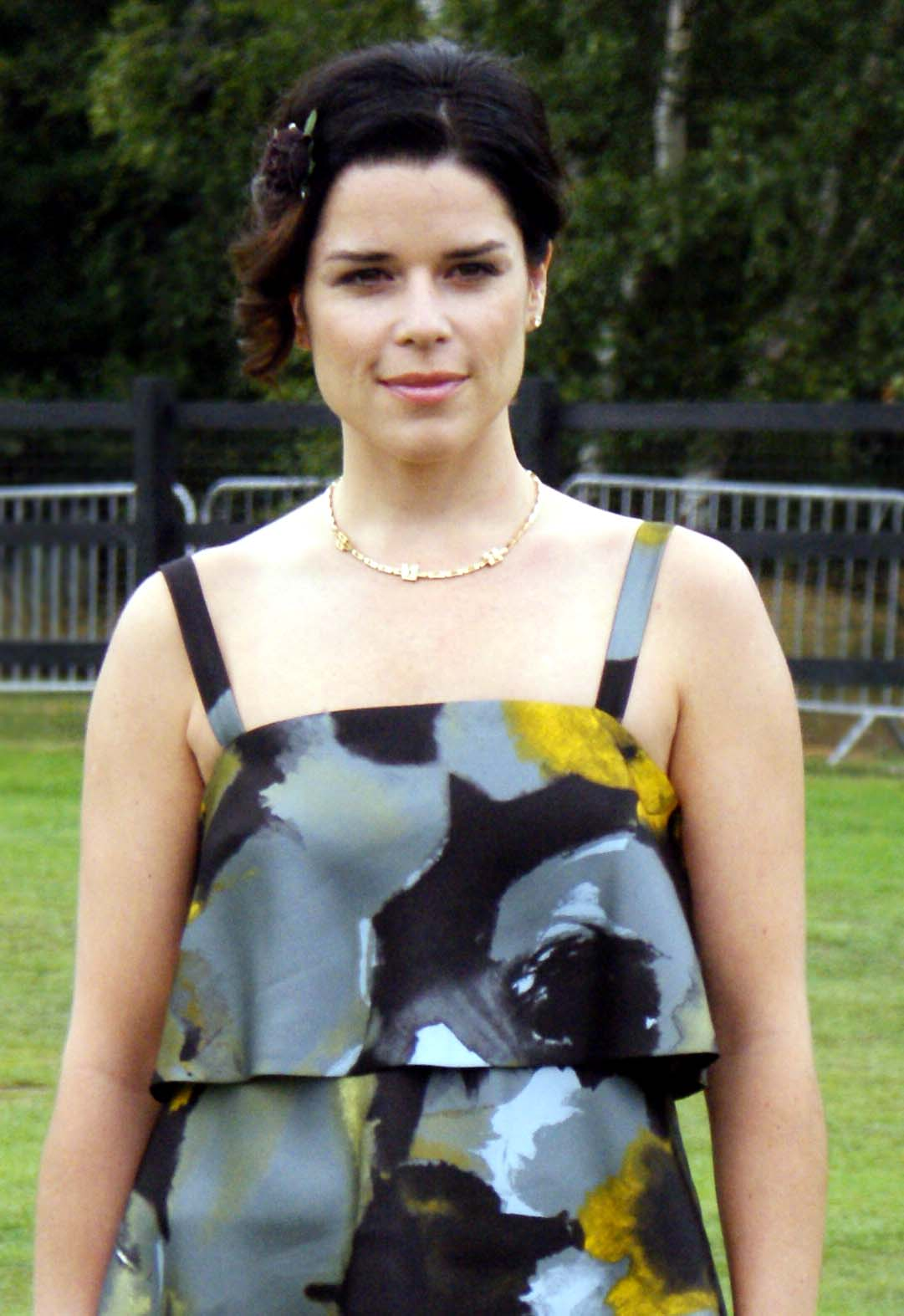
Campbell in 2009

Campbell went on to appear in several films that received a limited theatrical release but were well reviewed by critics, including the film Panic. Roger Ebert wrote that she "takes a tricky role and enriches it, brings it human dimension instead of being content with the 'sexpot' assignment." Campbell starred again as Sidney Prescott in Scream 3 (2000), which earned over $160 million but marked a temporary end for the franchise following mixed reviews. In his review of Scream 3, Roger Ebert wrote: "The camera loves her. She could become a really big star and then giggle at clips from this film at her AFI tribute." In retrospect, the parallels between Scream 3's themes of abuse and the Harvey Weinstein sexual abuse cases came to light. In 2002, she starred in Last Call, for which she won a Prism Award for Performance in TV Movie or Miniseries.

Campbell next co-wrote, produced and starred in the film The Company, which is about Chicago's Joffrey Ballet. Directed by Robert Altman, the idea for the film was conceived by Campbell in her teens. The film earned a limited release to positive reviews for its direction and Campbell's acting. The following year, she led the independent film When Will I Be Loved (2004), which was also praised by critics. Roger Ebert wrote that Campbell gave a performance that was "carnal, verbally facile, physically uninhibited and charged with intelligence. Not many actresses could have played this character, and fewer still could give us the sense she's making it up as she goes along."

In March 2006, Campbell made her West End theatre debut in a version of Arthur Miller's Resurrection Blues at the Old Vic theatre. The play received mixed reviews. Resurrection Blues was directed by Robert Altman, with whom Campbell had previously worked in The Company. Later in 2006, Campbell performed again in the West End in Love Song to mixed reviews.

Campbell then took on a three-year hiatus, explaining that it "got to a level, also, where the kinds of things that I was being offered were not the things I wanted to do. I was constantly being offered horror films, because I was known for horror films, or bad romantic comedies." On her overall career progression, she has stated that "I think I went from being a young girl / ingénue to a woman, which was great for me." Most notably, in 2009, Campbell had a starring role on NBC's short-lived series The Philanthropist.

=== 2010s ===
In 2011, Campbell starred in The Glass Man, which received a limited release. Also in 2011, 11 years after the previous installment, Campbell made her comeback to the Scream franchise in Scream 4 (2011), which received positive reviews and earned over $97 million. For her performance, she was nominated for Best Actress at the Scream Awards in 2011. On reprising the role of Sidney Prescott in future works, Campbell stated that "It would have to be something really special and really different. They'd have to be really convincing about who they decided to bring on as director, and I'd still have to do a bit of soul-searching on that one."

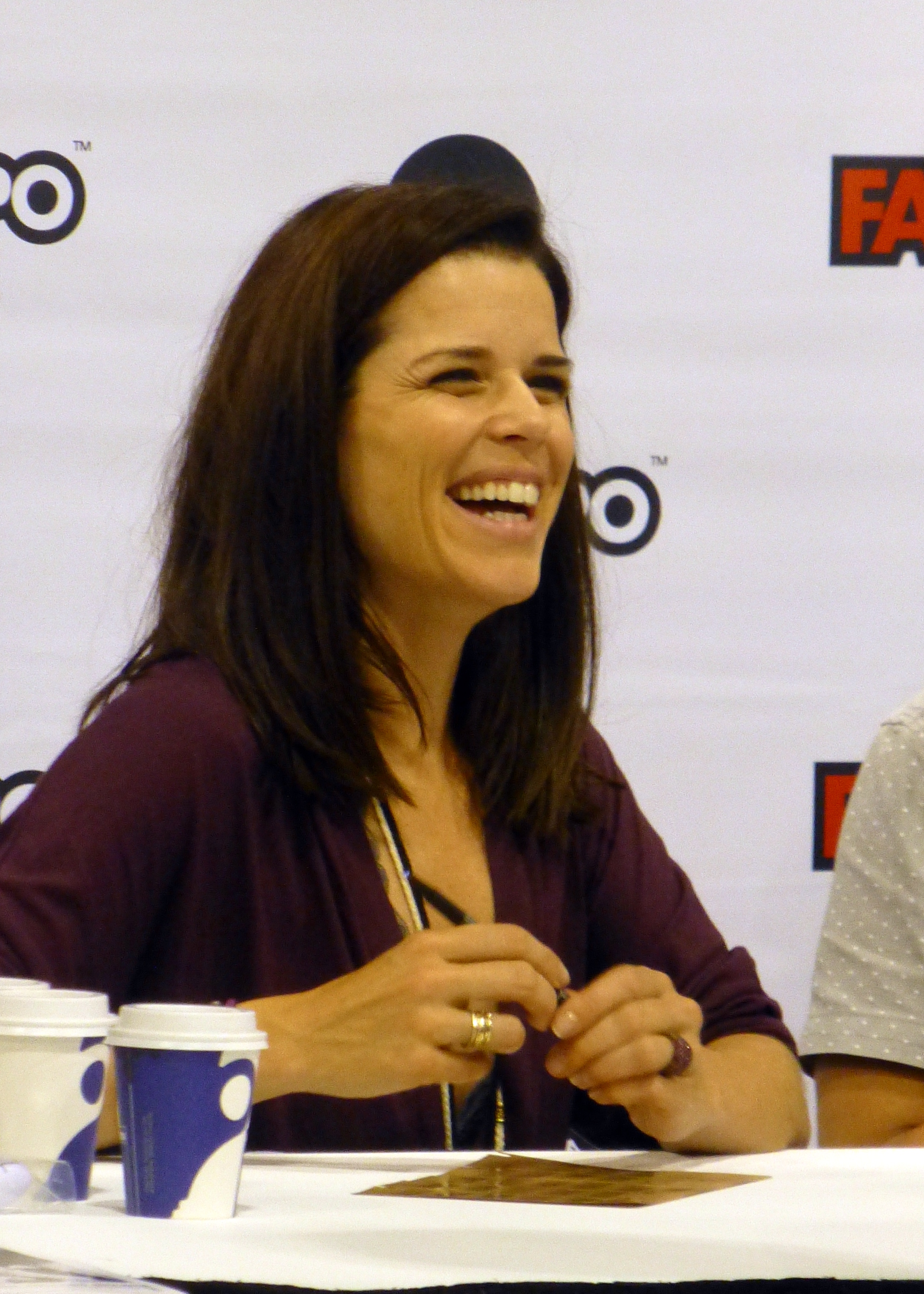
Campbell in 2015

Campbell next starred in the drama film Singularity, which premiered at Cannes Film Festival in May 2012. She also appeared in the 2012 miniseries Titanic: Blood and Steel, and starred in the 2013 Lifetime crime film An Amish Murder. Campbell went on to appear in guest or recurring roles in several television series, including the NBC supernatural drama Medium, the Fox animated sitcom The Simpsons, the ABC medical drama Grey's Anatomy, the AMC period drama Mad Men, the NBC sitcom Welcome to Sweden. In 2015, she played Katherine Oppenheimer in two episodes of the WGN period drama series Manhattan. On June 30, 2015, it was announced that Campbell would star as Texas-based political consultant LeAnn Harvey in the Netflix television drama House of Cards, beginning in the fourth season released in 2016. On the role of Harvey, the actress said in an interview with Business Insider that "I knew that what I wanted was a cable show with a good cast, and good writing, and it was respected, and an ensemble where I'm not carrying it, and then this came along. And then I couldn't have asked for anything better." Campbell was particularly praised by GQ magazine for her performance, who called her the "best thing" of the season and wrote that "she was exactly the competitor that the show's anti-heroes needed". In 2016, Campbell was honoured with the National Award of Excellence by the Association of Canadian Radio and Television Artists (ACTRA).

On June 22, 2017, it was reported that Campbell would star in Rawson Marshall Thurber's action film Skyscraper. She played Sarah Sawyer. The film was released on July 13 the following year to box office success, grossing over $304 million worldwide; in spite of this, the film earned mixed reviews. Campbell co-starred as Valerie Gannon in the 2018 independent drama film Hot Air. In 2019, Campbell starred as Rebecca Fine, a single mother struggling with a serious illness, in the Canadian drama film Castle in the Ground. The film had its world premiere at the 2019 Toronto International Film Festival and received generally positive reviews.

=== 2020s ===
It was announced in 2019 that Campbell would star as author Laura Sobiech in the biographical musical drama film Clouds, which is based on the true story of Zach Sobiech. She detailed her experience in playing the role, saying that "I'd have some stuff to shed every evening, there were days of heavy crying, and I'd just be drained." It was released in 2020 to positive reviews on Disney+. Variety magazine described Campbell's acting as "well played within narrow bounds". IndieWire stated that she does "a fine job of balancing unimaginable pain with hard-fought moments of joy" and that she "distills Laura Sobiech's religious fervor into a more general desperation".

In September 2020, it was confirmed that Campbell would reprise her role as Sidney Prescott for the fifth Scream film, directed by Matt Bettinelli-Olpin and Tyler Gillett. She was initially "apprehensive" and hesitant to take the role given the death of Wes Craven; however, she was convinced to join once "the new directors came to me with this beautiful letter saying that they've become directors and love film because of these films, and because of Wes, and they really want to be true to his story and his journey with these films, so I was really happy to hear that." The film was released on January 14, 2022, and earned widespread acclaim. It was also a major commercial success, grossing over $135 million against a budget of $24 million. Campbell was lauded for her performance once more, and she was particularly praised for her "fresh" take on the role of Prescott. The Hollywood Reporter wrote that "... it's a pleasure to see Campbell again in fine form as Sidney, striding back into Woodsboro to take care of unfinished business". Elle magazine named her the "Reigning Queen of Scream" and stated that "Sidney might not have that impact on people were it not for Campbell's portrayal, rife with vulnerability, intelligence, and a palatable dose of humor."

In February 2021, Campbell was cast as Mickey Haller's ex-wife Maggie McPherson in a television adaptation of The Lincoln Lawyer for Netflix; The series premiered on May 13, 2022, and entered Netflix's Top 10 that same day. It was received positively by critics, and Lara Solanki of Radio Times felt that she was more "dogged and determined, qualities she showed once again in this year's Scream reboot" and said that giving the actress more screen time "would not be an unwelcome development". As of 2026, the show has run for four seasons, with a fifth season in development. In February 2022, Campbell signed with both the Gersh Agency and Anonymous Content.

Campbell was approached to reprise the role of Sidney Prescott in the sixth installment in the Scream franchise. At the Mad Monster Party Convention, she stated that "There's no script yet. There is a draft coming in soon is what I was told. Actually, I was supposed to call a producer yesterday, because he wanted to talk to me about what's going on. You know, we'll see. I'll read the script and see how I feel." In June 2022, it was announced she would not be returning to the Scream franchise after salary negotiations stalled with Paramount. She said she could not bear "walking on set and feeling undervalued" and that the offer would have been different had she been a man, stating that:

As a woman I have had to work extremely hard in my career to establish my value, especially when it comes to Scream. I felt the offer that was presented to me did not equate to the value I have brought to the franchise. It's been a very difficult decision to move on. To all my Scream fans, I love you. You've always been so incredibly supportive to me. I'm forever grateful to you and to what this franchise has given me over the past 25 years.

In May 2022, Campbell was cast as Raven in a recurring role for the Peacock television series adaptation of Twisted Metal. The series was released in July 2023 and The Hollywood Reporter said that she was "coming across as cheery in a way that's instantly suspicious". In August 2022, it was announced that Campbell had been cast in the lead role of the ABC series Avalon as Detective Nicole "Nic" Searcy. It was later announced in November that the series had been scrapped, though it was being shopped to other networks.

In July 2023, it was announced that Campbell would serve as executive producer of the documentary Swan Song. Profiling the final days of ballerina Karen Kain at the National Ballet of Canada, Campbell enjoyed working on the film as it tied into her previous ballet interest. Swan Song was selected to premiere in the Special Presentations line-up of the Toronto International Film Festival and was scheduled to have a 2024 theatrical release.

In March 2024, Campbell announced through her Instagram that she would reprise the role of Sidney Prescott in Scream 7. She was paid a salary of $7 million dollars. Shawn Robbins, a director of movie analytics at Fandango Media, said that "Neve Campbell is to Scream what Jamie Lee Curtis is for the Halloween franchise, she's a big draw, especially for older generations who grew up with the original films." The film was released in February 2026 to negative reviews but set the record for the highest opening weekend of the franchise, with Campbell's performance garnering praise.

=== Upcoming projects ===
In November 2025, she was revealed as part of the cast for the second season of the Netflix spy series Black Doves. The following year, Campbell announced she would return as Sidney in the eighth Scream film.

== Activism ==
Campbell has advocated against child poverty and world hunger. In a 2016 interview, she declared herself a socialist. In 2020, she and several other Scream co-stars hosted a charity event to raise funds for the National Breast Cancer Foundation. In July 2022, she appeared in an advertisement for the American Red Cross, where she played Sidney Prescott.

== Public image ==
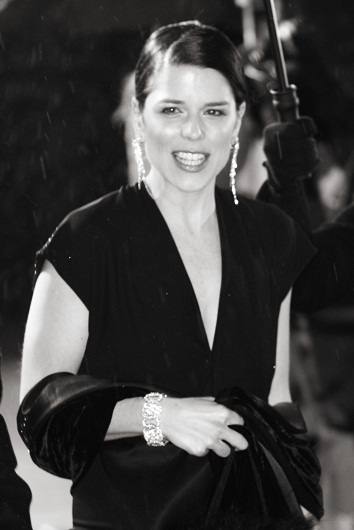
Campbell attending the 2006 British Academy Film Awards

Campbell has often been referred to as a scream queen, beginning with her work in the Scream franchise. In addition to her work in the horror genre, Campbell twice successfully established herself in mainstream film and television, beginning from the early to mid-1990s with Party of Five, where she was described as "television's most believable teenager", and resuming in the 2010s, following a hiatus, by focusing on dramatic works which have earned her equal praise. The role of Sidney Prescott as played by Campbell established her as one of the highest-grossing and acclaimed heroines of all time in the slasher genre. She has frequently been included on lists citing the best actresses in horror. Despite her status in the genre, she stated that she finds horror movies "difficult to watch".

Campbell has often been referred to as a sex symbol, a title she has held since her breakout role in Party of Five in the 1990s. She is also recognized for her looks and fashion style. She appeared on People magazine's list of "50 Most Beautiful People" twice, and Bustle magazine described her as "one of the most recognizable faces in Hollywood". She ranked third on Empire's 1998 list of "100 Sexiest Movie Stars" and appeared on several editions of FHM's "FHM 100 Sexiest Women in the World".

Campbell was name-dropped in the Weeknd's dance-pop album Dawn FM (2022). She was referenced in the single "Here We Go... Again" featuring Tyler, the Creator in the lyric "I loved her right, make her scream like Neve Campbell." On an interview with James Corden, she said that "at first, my publicist told me, and she was like, 'The Weeknd,' and I was like, 'Wait, which weekend? Last weekend?' I had no idea what she was talking about. And then I realized, 'Oh, the guy who played at the Super Bowl! That guy!' Fellow Canadian. How cool."

Campbell trended on Twitter in January 2023 when Paramount Pictures was widely criticized for the Scream VI pay dispute. The news surprised Campbell, who said: "I had a friend text me and say, 'You're trending right now.' I've never been on Twitter. I didn't know what it meant." Fellow Scream actors David Arquette and Jasmin Savoy Brown came to her defense, among others. IndieWire noted Campbell had spent 26 years acting in the franchise and announced it was "the end of an era". Her announced return to the franchise in 2025 brought further public attention to Campbell.

== Personal life ==
Campbell has stated, "I am a practicing Catholic, but my lineage is Jewish, so if someone asks me if I'm Jewish, I say yes."

Campbell married Jeff Colt on April 3, 1995, and they divorced in May 1998. In 2005, Campbell began dating John Light, whom she met while filming Investigating Sex. They became engaged in December 2005 and married in Malibu, California, on May 5, 2007. They lived together in Islington, London, for five years, until Campbell filed for divorce on June 30, 2010, in Los Angeles.

In March 2012, Campbell and her partner, actor JJ Feild, confirmed that they were expecting their first child together. Their son was born later that year. On June 29, 2018, Campbell announced the adoption of their second son.

== See also ==
- List of Canadian actors
