= Investigating Sex =

2001 film by Alan Rudolph

- Directed by: Alan Rudolph
- Screenplay by: Alan Rudolph
- Based on: Investigating Sex: Surrealist Discussions 1928-1932 (Recherches sur la sexualité, janvier 1928-août 1932) edited by José Pierre; translated by Malcolm Imrie; with Dawn Ades, and JoAnn Wypijewski; of André Breton, Yves Tanguy, Louis Aragon, Man Ray, Max Ernst Antonin Artaud, Paul Eluard, Benjamin Peret, Jacques Prevert, Marcel Duhamel, Yves Tanguy, Pierre Unik, Pierre Naville, and others;
- Produced by: Jana Edelbaum; Frank Hübner; Nick Nolte; Alan Rudolph; Greg Shapiro
- Starring: Neve Campbell; Til Schweiger; Nick Nolte; Julie Delpy; Robin Tunney; Jeremy Davies; Alan Cumming; John Light; Dermot Mulroney
- Cinematography: Florian Ballhaus
- Edited by: John Helde
- Music by: Ulf Skogsbergh
- Production companies: Gemini Films; Apollo Media; Kingsgate; Janus Films
- Distributed by: UGC Distribution
- Release dates: June 17, 2001 (SIFF); April 18, 2002 (Russia)
- Running time: 108 minutes
- Countries: Germany; United States
- Language: English
- Budget: $8 million

Investigating Sex (alternate title: Intimate Affairs) is a 2001 comedy-drama film written and directed by Alan Rudolph, starring Neve Campbell, Til Schweiger, Nick Nolte and Dermot Mulroney. The film is based on Investigating Sex: Surrealist Research 1928-1932, a book of Surrealist writers' discussions about sex led by André Breton and compiled by José Pierre. Rudolph called it "one of the most horrific experiences I've ever had, yet this was combined with one of the most pleasurable and enjoyable and creative experiences."

== Plot ==
Set in the year 1929 in Cambridge, Massachusetts, Edgar Faldo is a young professor who decides to assemble a group of friends at his family mansion to discuss the topic of sex and its advantages. Edgar hires two young women to work as stenographers to record the daily debates that his friends discuss to scientifically analyze sexuality .

The two women, the sexually active Zoe and the frigid Alice, have mixed feelings being around as Edgar brings over three of his friends, who include oddball English Surrealist painter Sevy, German writer and novelist Monty, and fellow professor Peter. Edgar's father, Mr. Faldo, shows up with his new trophy wife, Sasha, to oversee the events as others who are Lorenz, Oscar, Sevy's wife Janet, and Edgar's disapproving French girlfriend, Chloe, all turn up during different meeting sessions to talk and interact with everyone on the taboos spoken for the "experiment" as Edgar puts it.

== Cast ==
- Dermot Mulroney as Edgar Faldo
- Julie Delpy as Chloe
- Robin Tunney as Zoe
- Neve Campbell as Alice
- Jeremy Davies as Oscar
- Alan Cumming as Sevy
- Til Schweiger as Monty
- John Light as Peter
- Nick Nolte as Faldo
- Terrence Howard as Lorenz
- Emily Bruni as Janet
- Tuesday Weld as Sasha Faldo
- Jacqueline Anderson as Linda
- Joseph May as Roger
- Marc Hosemann as Joey

== Production ==
Rudolph was planning a film about Man Ray when sent a copy of the Pierre's book from actor Wallace Shawn. He was not interested in adapting the story of the surrealists in Paris "but I figured, 'What would happen if this was in America?' with people trying to reach those heights but were incapable of it?" He and Michael Henry Wilson (French/American film historian, documentary filmmaker) adapted the story as a screenplay. They created fictional characters for the dialogues and moved the setting to New England.

The film was shot in Berlin in 2000 using German finance. Neve Campbell, who played a stenographer, described the film as a "no money, no nothing film, but a really great acting exercise." During the making of the film, Neve Campbell met John Light who she later married.

I kept wondering who transcribed the original sessions. This became the plot of our story. I was very pleased with the film. The financiers weren't. We barely strayed from the screenplay, which they enthusiastically endorsed. Then they became horrified seeing discussions of sex and not depictions of it, which were never in the writing. We aimed for Oscar Wilde. They wanted Wet 'n Wild. - Alan Rudolph, January 2022

Well, it was made in Germany, subbing as Cambridge, MA...Nick Nolte and his partner found two other financial partners and raised the money to shoot very quickly in Germany. It took this German game show company and put them on the map, getting them one of these government grants which is really just what they were after. They changed the rules of the game afterwards, though, and decided that if it was a sex movie they could sell it, so they turned on it and when I wouldn't make any changes, they abandoned it. I think we've finally gotten the film back–we showed it undercover to the Seattle film festival closing night and it was well received. - Alan Rudolph, October 2002

== Release ==
After a long delay, the film was released on DVD in the U.S. on December 23, 2007 with a different title, Intimate Affairs. According to Alan Cumming, the delay was caused by a dispute with the German producers. Rudolph said "We did it with some foreign money, and the people just turned out to be monsters. And they sat on it.” He later said the distributors "thought it needed to be a different kind of movie."

As Intimate Affairs it was broadcast by Showtime (TV network) in 2008.

The movie did screen at the Seattle film festival and at a film festival in Denver.

== Critical reception ==
The film received mixed reviews. Film Comment called it "one of the most enjoyable movies of the year," praising Rudolph's screwball comedy-like dialogue. Variety panned it as "too dated, and far too timid, to spark any real exploration of mind or body."

Nathan Rabin of The A.V. Club, reviewing the DVD release, called the film a "pleasant surprise," likening it to "Kinsey re-imagined as a goofy sex comedy." Filmink felt "Like a lot of Rudolph movies, it feels like a Woody Allen film without as many laughs. The sex talk has dated somewhat, especially in these Gen Z days, and there are too many characters... Nonetheless, there’s plenty to admire here and it’s great to see Tuesday Weld on screen."
