= When Will I Be Loved (film) =

- Theatrical poster
- Directed by: James Toback
- Written by: James Toback
- Produced by: Ron Rotholz
- Starring: Neve Campbell; Fred Weller; Dominic Chianese
- Edited by: Suzy Elmiger
- Music by: Oli "Power" Grant
- Distributed by: IFC Films; MGM Home Entertainment
- Release dates: June 6, 2004 (Lake Placid Film Festival); September 10, 2004 (US)
- Running time: 81 minutes
- Country: United States
- Language: English
- Box office: $159,429

When Will I Be Loved is a 2004 American erotic drama film written and directed by James Toback and starring Neve Campbell. The film had a 35-page script and was mostly improvised throughout its 12-day shoot.

== Plot ==
Vera (Neve Campbell) is a femme fatale for the 21st century: a beautiful, capricious young woman living in New York who begins exploring the limits of her sexual and intellectual power. She picks up men on the street and has sex with them in her apartment. She also videotapes a sexual romp with a female lover and has sexually frank discussions with her potential employer. As the daughter of wealthy, indulgent parents, Vera seems to be improvising her way through the beginning of her life as an adult.

Her boyfriend, Ford (Frederick Weller), is a fast-talking hustler prepared to do anything to make a buck. Aware of Vera's promiscuity, Ford sees a chance to make big money when he meets an ageing Italian media mogul, named Count Tommaso (Dominic Chianese), who is in love with Vera because of her sexuality, her intelligence, and what he perceives as her naiveté. Ford cooks up an idea to pimp Vera out to the Count for $100,000, easy money, if he can only talk Vera into it. Incredibly, she agrees. Everything appears to be going even better than planned.

But both men have gravely underestimated Vera, who has an agenda of her own. Ford and the Count unwittingly play right into her hands, and when her plan of deception and manipulation comes to fruition, the results are staggering.

== Cast ==
- Neve Campbell as Vera Barrie
- Frederick Weller as Ford Welles
- Dominic Chianese as Count Tommaso Lupo
- Ashley Shelton as Ashley
- James Toback as Professor Hassan Al-Ibrahim Ben Rabinowitz
- Oliver "Power" Grant as Power
- Mike Tyson as himself
- Lori Singer as herself

== Critical reception ==
When Will I Be Loved received generally negative reviews. The films holds a score of 32%, based on 73 reviews, on the review aggregator site Rotten Tomatoes. Its consensus says "Neve Campbell bares all in this seemingly misogynistic trifle." Metacritic gave the film a 39/100 indicating "generally unfavorable reviews".

Despite being reviled by most critics, Roger Ebert gave the film four out of four stars, writing "When Will I Be Loved is like a jazz solo that touches familiar themes on its way to a triumphant and unexpected conclusion."
