= Robert M. Rucker =

American drummer (born 1967)

Robert Mansfield Rucker
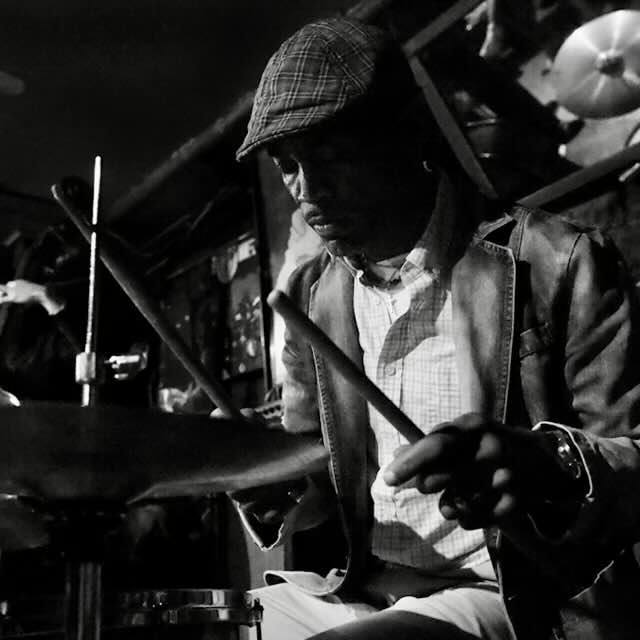
- Robert "Rook" Rucker at Smalls

Background information
- Also known as: Rook
- Born: Robert Mansfield Rucker II; November 4, 1967 (age 58); Chicago, Illinois
- Origin: Florida A&M University; University of North Florida; Manhattan School of Music; Fairleigh Dickinson University
- Genre: jazz
- Occupations: Jazz Musician; Music Educator/Certified Music Teacher
- Years active: 1994–present
- Label: Independent
- Website: Robert Rucker Project

Robert Mansfield Rucker (born Chicago, Illinois, raised in Miami, Florida) is a jazz drummer, music teacher, and composer.

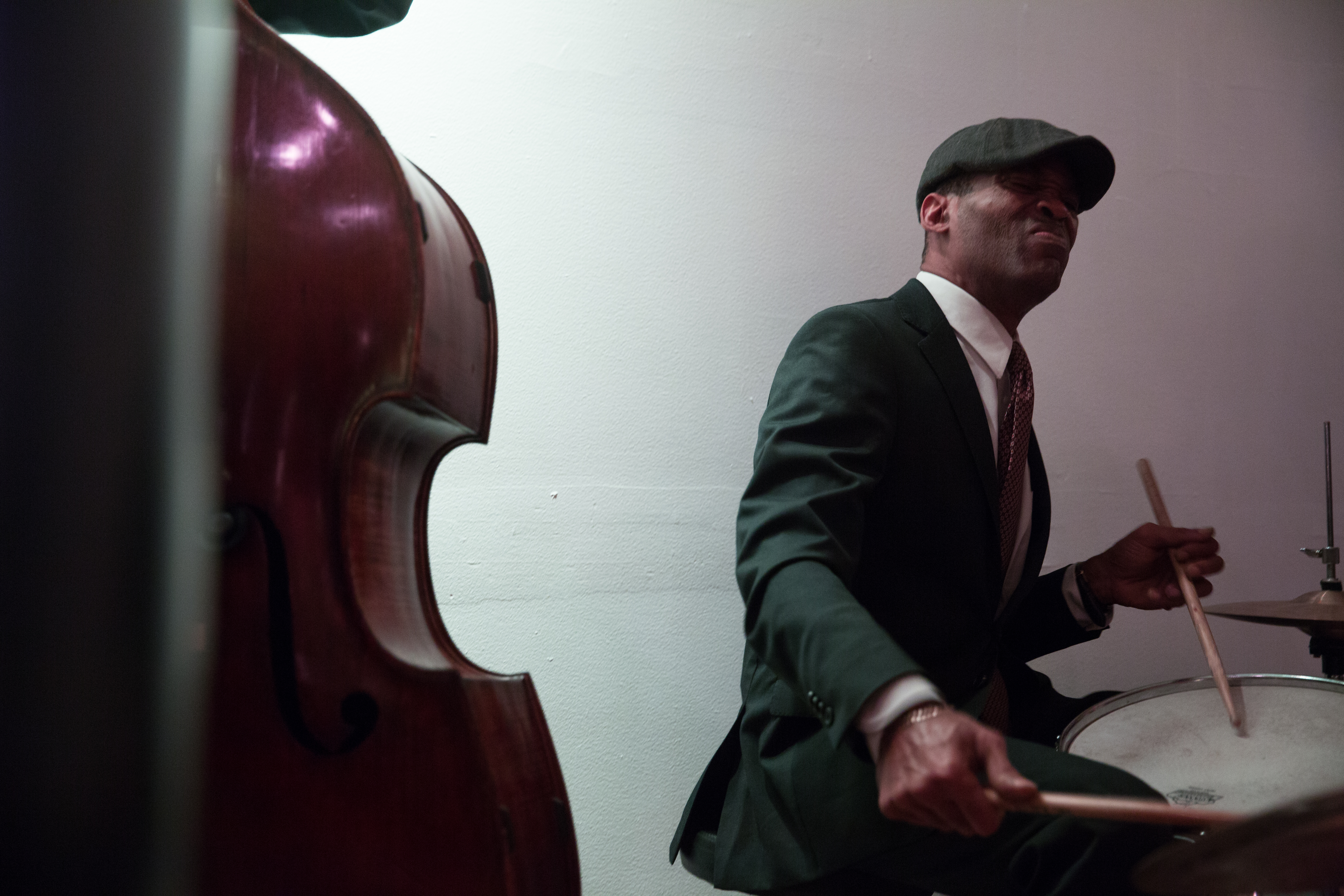
Robert Rucker Project

Rucker has recorded and performed with Grammy Award-winning artists Wynton Marsalis, John Daversa, Scotty Barnhart and Ted Nash. Rucker has also shared the stage with notable musicians such as Marcus Roberts, Wessell (Warm Daddy) Anderson, Wycliffe Gordon, Philip Harper, Eric Lewis, Stephon Harris, and Sam and Dave. Rucker has also produced music for Sony Pictures alongside Stephen Marley and Dead Prez, and performs with a jazz band called The Robert Rucker Project.

Rucker is endorsed by Bosphorus and SoulTone Cymbals and Canopus Drums.

== Early life ==
After graduating from Miami Douglas MacArthur North, Rucker attended Florida A&M University in Tallahassee, Florida. He was a member of the notable "The Marching 100" Marching Band and Jazz Ensemble. He later moved to Jacksonville, Florida, and transferred to the University of North Florida where he received his B.A in Music. In 1995, he moved New York to attend graduate School at Manhattan School of Music. After graduation, he began to teach music in New York and New Jersey Public Schools.

== Music career ==
Rucker appears on Wynton Marsalis' Amongst the People: Live at the House of Tribes on Blue Note Records. He also is featured on the soundtrack of the movie Black or White with hip-hop duo Dead Prez. Rucker released and produced his debut CD Make Blue featuring Philip Harper and Todd Williams. In 2002, Rucker's latest release Blue York featured the world-renowned trumpeter Wynton Marsalis.

== Discography ==
=== As leader ===
- 1998: Make Blue
- 2002: Blue York

=== As sideman ===
- 2000: Movie Soundtrack "Black & White"Dem Crazy
- 2005: Amongst the People "Live at the House of Tribes(Blue Note Records)
- 2022: Introducing Quartet Trio "Live at Smalls Jazz Club
