= Oliver "Power" Grant =

American producer and businessman (1970–2026)

- Grant in 2019
- Born: Oliver Grant; November 24, 1970; Jamaica
- Died: February 24, 2026 (aged 55)
- Occupations: Entrepreneur; Fashion mogul; Producer; Actor
- Known for: Wu-Tang Clan

Oliver "Power" Grant (November 24, 1970 – February 24, 2026) was an American businessman, producer and actor. As a close associate of the hip-hop group Wu-Tang Clan, Grant executive produced all of the Wu-Tang Clan albums. He was the original founder and CEO of the Wu Wear clothing line and stores. He was also briefly an actor in films including Belly and Black and White and produced the PlayStation video game Wu-Tang: Shaolin Style. On February 24, 2026, Grant died from pancreatic cancer at the age of 55.

== Life and career ==
=== Wu-Tang Clan affiliation ===
Grant was born in Jamaica, and grew up in the Park Hill Projects in Staten Island with Wu-Tang Clan. He was childhood friends with RZA's older brother Divine, and made a sizable investment in the group's future. Over a game of chess, two of the Wu-Tang Clan founding members gave him the name "Power". Grant is also an older brother of Wu-Tang's affiliate Killarmy member Killa Sin.

=== Wu Wear ===
Grant became successful as a clothing mogul in 1995 when he launched Wu Wear, often regarded as one of the first artist-inspired clothing lines. He began by selling clothes with the group's logo on it via mail order. Initially, manufacturers wouldn't extend Grant the credit, but after the group saw platinum success, he opened a Wu Wear store on Victory Boulevard in their hometown of Staten Island, and an office in Manhattan's garment district to sell wholesale. According to the Of Mics and Men documentary which debuted on Showtime in 2019, Power's business moves led to the opening of four stores across the country. The line was carried in Macy's, Rich's and the (now defunct) clothing store d.e.m.o., resulting in annual revenue topping out at upwards of $25 million during the group's peak years. In 2008, Grant renamed it "Wu-Tang Brand" and discontinued the Wu Wear line which was being extensively counterfeited.

Grant and the RZA joined forces with Live Nation Merchandise to relaunch the classic clothing line in 2017. Power served as the brand's "Historic Creative Consultant" to ensure quality creative control. The line includes classic designs as well as new items. In a 2013 interview, Power discussed the Wu's lasting legacy and the impact its brand made on the industry, crediting the Wu's clothing line and other successful side-ventures as early entrepreneurialism that laid the foundation and open doors for future generations of hip-hop artists to explore other business opportunities outside of music. "Nowadays, all the walls are broken [for Hip Hop artists]. That’s what we were fighting for ... this culture would be that much ... further if there was a lot less blocking going on and a lot less hating going on [by corporate America]."

=== Film and television ===
Grant made his film debut as "Knowledge" in the urban cult classic Belly, directed by Hype Williams. In addition, he played the role of "Rich Bower" in writer/director James Toback’s Black and White, which also starred Ben Stiller, Robert Downey Jr., Brooke Shields, Elijah Wood, Mike Tyson, and several others. He would work again with Toback as actor and composer for When Will I Be Loved, starring Neve Campbell. He also had the role in the feature film Coalition. He has a co-starring role in talk show host and former nationally syndicated shock jock Wendy Williams’ life story Queen of Media as her husband Big Kev.

==== Wu-Tang: Shaolin Style ====
In 1999, Grant produced, developed and released Wu-Tang: Shaolin Style, a four-player 3D fighting video game for the PlayStation. The Wu-Tang Clan is the basis for the game's story and setting and features characters based on their stage personas and the martial arts themes of their music. Some members of the group also provided voiceover work for the game and made vocal and production contributions to the game's music.

==== Wu-Tang: An American Saga ====
In the Hulu exclusive Wu-Tang: An American Saga series, Power is portrayed by actor Marcus Callender, who watched as much footage of Power as he could find and wrote "It is a complete honor to be portraying one of the vital pieces of the Wu-Tang Clan" on his Instagram account.

== Death ==
Grant died of pancreatic cancer on February 24, 2026, at the age of 55. In a statement, the Wu Tang Clan paid tribute to Grant, referring to him as "a visionary force, a pillar of the Wu-Tang family, and a global architect of culture," writing: "The Grant and Wu-Tang families are profoundly thankful for the overwhelming outpouring of love and support from around the world. Power will always be loved, and his legacy will forever remain."

== Filmography ==
=== Films ===
Year	Title	Role	References
1998	Belly	Knowledge	
1999	Black and White	Rich Bower	
2004	When Will I Be Loved	Power	
2004	Coalition		
2017	An Imperfect Murder	Rameesh	
Unreleased	Queen of Media		
