= Corpus Callosum (film) =

2002 film

*Corpus Callosum
- Directed by: Michael Snow
- Written by: Michael Snow
- Starring: Jacqueline Anderson
- Cinematography: Harald Bachmann; Robbi Hinds
- Edited by: Paul Cormack
- Production company: Michael Snow Artworks
- Distributed by: Canadian Filmmakers Distribution Centre
- Release date: 2002
- Running time: 92 minutes
- Country: Canada
- Language: English

*Corpus Callosum is a 2002 experimental Canadian film directed by Michael Snow. The title is a reference to the part of the brain which was once thought to have been home to the human soul, and which passes messages between the two hemispheres of the brain. "Corpus callosum" in the film refers to the mysterious space between illusion and reality. It won the Independent/Experimental Film and Video Award from the Los Angeles Film Critics Association Awards. Corpus Callosum is said to be a "digital self-appraisal of [Snow's] work", showcasing his passion for visual manipulations through editing. Throughout the film, Snow's voice can be heard as he directs the film, adding to the break in the fourth wall which the film attempts to create.

== Plot ==
Office workers go about their day-to-day business, all while their surroundings constantly shift which does not affect them. Workers' clothing changes on their bodies without them noticing, people they are conversing with disappear. At one point, office workers engaging in a meeting suddenly stick together as if drawn to one another by static electricity. Other men in the room begin to contort others' bodies, tying each other into knots with their own limbs. Two men outside shake hands and, when their hands touch, both men melt into one another, emerging after a few seconds having reversed all physical characteristics. People who work in the office also seem to have god-like powers, changing things as simple as the lighting in the room, to as impossible as causing people to walk on the ceiling rather than the floor – all by changing settings on their computers.

A home is shown in which live a mother, a father, and a boy. The three sit on their sofa, completely enthralled by what they are watching on the television as everything around them shifts. The sofa changes colours, as do the walls, the photos, their clothing and more. The living room they sit in is filthy. Scattered about are empty and full cups, pizza and takeout containers which also shift with no apparent notice from the family members. At one point the end credits play on the screen, as though the film were ending. After the credits finish, the film continues playing the same scene, the family sitting in their living room just as they were before.

The final scene of this film is a couple who go to a movie in a theatre. The movie plays, and the couple watches the film, which shows themselves from another perspective.

== Cast ==
- John Massey
- John Penner
- Berj Bannayan
- Greg Hermanovic
- Jacqueline Anderson as Walking Woman
- Joanne Tod
- Kim Plate
- Tom Sherman
