= Resurrection Blues =

2002 Arthur Miller play

Resurrection Blues is a 2002 play by Arthur Miller. Though Miller was not known for his humor, this play uses a pointed comedic edge to intensify his observations about the dangers, as well as the benefits, of blind belief: political, religious, economic and emotional.

== Plot ==
The story is set in an unnamed third world Latin American country. The plot revolves around a captured prisoner who may or may not be the second coming of Christ, though Miller deliberately leaves the divinity of his unseen protagonist ambiguous. He is said to be able to perform miracles such as walk through walls, a major problem for the prison guards, and, because of his popularity among the impoverished citizens, the military dictator of the nation has sentenced him to be crucified. This creates many moral dilemmas with the play's cast of characters, which include a wealthy land-owner who is the cousin of the dictator, his depressed daughter—a close friend of the accused—and an American television production team that arrives to broadcast the crucifixion.

== Characters ==
The plot has six central characters:

- General Felix Barriaux – the dictator of the country who orders the crucifixion. For a dictator, he is a poignant and witty character who holds some sympathy for the audience despite his obsession with money and power. He has been played by actors ranging from Munson Hicks to Maximilian Schell.
- Henri Schultz – cousin to Felix and owns a large chain of pharmaceutical companies, but is reluctant to be a businessman and retires to teach philosophy. He once joined a revolutionary group to fight against Felix but it was unsuccessful. Ironically there is still a familial bond of friendship between Felix and himself and he spends the play trying to dissuade Felix from the crucifixion. He has been played by James Fox and Patrick Husted.
- Jeanine Schultz – daughter of Henri, she is a modern form of Mary Magdalene as she is in love with the man about to be crucified and opens the play having tried to commit suicide. She too was caught up with the revolution but when her father gave up, she held on to the spirit her comrades were shot by Felix when they were captured, but she was spared. She has been played by Patricia Ageheim and Neve Campbell.
- Skip L. Cheesboro – the producer of the American television special that is to be made about the crucifixion. He is a no-nonsense man who, in his own words, admits that "some of us have to be shallow so others can be deep." He has been played by Doug Wert and Matthew Modine.
- Emily Shapiro – the TV special's director who is, at the beginning of the play, unaware of the crucifixion. It is suggested that a relationship with Skip may have existed but when she finds out about the crucifixion, she is shocked and repulsed by Skip for even suggesting filming it. She then has a relationship with Felix whom she begs to call off the crucifixion. She is seen to be the voice of reason within the play and has been played by Gretchen Egolf and Jane Adams.
- Stanley – a disciple to the prisoner and is interrogated by Felix when he escapes. A self-proclaimed hippie, he addresses the approachability of 'Christ' saying that he himself in unsure whether he is Christ or not. He produces a lot of wit at the same time as introducing new ideas. He has been played by Douglas Rees and Peter McDonald.

Other characters include the filming crew, an omnipresent military and the captain of the police, who respects Henri Schultz because of his wealth.

== Production history ==
There was originally a reading that Jerry Zaks directed so that Miller could see what he had. The cast included Nathan Lane as Felix Barreaux, Bill Murray as Skip Cheeseboro, Julia Louis-Dreyfus as Emily, and Richard Libertini.

=== World premiere in Minneapolis ===
Resurrection Blues originally premiered August 9, 2002, at the Guthrie Theater in Minneapolis, Minnesota, under the artistic direction of Joe Dowling. This world premiere was directed by Minnesota native David Esbjornson. The cast featured John Bedford Lloyd as General Felix Barreaux, Jeff Weiss, and Laila Robins. Arthur Miller chose the Guthrie Theater for the play's debut, citing the quality of its audiences and the outdatedness of premiering a play on Broadway. Miller continued to work on the script up until his death in 2005 although the Minneapolis production of the original script fared far better than the later production at the Old Vic in London.

=== Philadelphia ===
The East Coast premiere of Resurrection Blues debuted at the Wilma Theater in Philadelphia, Pennsylvania on September 2, 2003. The production was directed by Jiri Zizka. The cast featured Munson Hicks, Patrick Husted, Lindsay Smiling, Gretchen Egolf, Doug Wert, William Zielinski, Miriam A. Hyman, Patricia Ageheim, Douglas Rees, Jennifer A. Brown, David Dallas, Patrick Doran, Ralph Edmonds, Karen McArthur, and Michael Speer.

=== San Diego ===
The West Coast premiere was presented at the Old Globe Theatre in San Diego, California, running in March 2004 to April 25. Directed by Mark Lamos, the cast featured John de Lancie as Felix Barriaux, Daniel Davis, Chris Henry Coffey, Bruce Bohne, Dana Slamp and Jennifer Regan. The Los Angeles Times reviewer wrote: "...the play is still flailing in several directions and not wholly achieving its goals...The proposed crucifixion victim appears only as a glowing light. Despite eyewitness accounts of his human form, he may be divine or at least an inspired figment of the imagination, Miller suggests. He must decide whether to be crucified or to disappear. This is an interesting tangent, but it further removes the play from the nitty-gritty of the political realities that drove Miller to write. His continuing sense of adventure at age 88 is awe-inspiring, but the play itself isn't."

Miller worked with the director and cast through the rehearsal process to find a more straightforward message than in the previous production.

=== London ===
The UK premiere was in March 2006 under the artistic direction of Kevin Spacey at the Old Vic. The play was directed by Robert Altman. The play suffered mass criticism despite boasting a "distinguished" cast that included James Fox, Maximilian Schell, Jane Adams (Emily) and Neve Campbell. It was forced to close early especially after the actress playing Emily (the American film director) left the production. Spacey said the cast suffered from "nerves the like of which I've never seen". Charles Spencer, reviewing for The Telegraph noted that "Miller was apparently revising the play right up to his death last year, after two earlier drafts had flopped in the States."

The New York Times reviewer observed: "Between the relentless public attention and the sometimes scathing reviews, Kevin Spacey has had a rough year and a half as artistic director at the Old Vic Theater. But nothing was so disastrous as the debacle surrounding 'Resurrection Blues,' a star-laden production that drew horrendous reviews and closed a week early this spring, just in time for the announcement that the theater would go dark until September."

=== Chicago ===
The Eclipse Theatre Company produced the Chicago debut of Resurrection Blues as part of its 2010 season, which focused on Arthur Miller. Eclipse Theatre, known for its "one playwright, one season" approach, also mounted After the Fall and A Memory of Two Mondays. Their fully staged production of the play was directed by Nathaniel Swift and featured Nina O'Keefe, Ron Butts, Matt Welton, Joe McCauley, Rebecca Prescott, and J. P. Pierson. Reviewer Paige Listerud wrote, "A little miracle is taking place at the Greenhouse Theatre Center—Eclipse Theatre is brilliantly executing a late and oft misunderstood play by Arthur Miller ."

== See also ==
- Arthur Miller
