= The WhoRidas =

American hip-hop duo

- Origin: Oakland, California, U.S.
- Genres: West Coast hip hop
- Years active: 1995–present
- Labels: Delicious Vinyl
- Members: Hasaan Mahmoud; Meikeo Taylor

The Whoridas are a hip hop duo from Oakland, California consisting of cousins King Saan (Hasaan Mahmoud) aka ChopBlack and Mr. Taylor (Meiko Taylor). King Saan is the younger brother of the MC known as Saafir.

== Discography ==
=== Studio albums ===
- Whoridin' (1997)
- High Times (1999)
- Corner Store (2002)

=== Singles ===
- "Shot Callin' & Big Ballin'" (1996)
- "Talkin' Bout Bank" (1997)
- "Get Lifted" (1998)
- "Dock of Bay" (1999)
