= Black and White (1999 drama film) =

1999 American film directed by James Toback

- Theatrical release poster
- Directed by: James Toback
- Written by: James Toback
- Produced by: Daniel Bigel; Michael Mailer; Ron Rotholz; Edward R. Pressman (executive producer)
- Starring: Robert Downey Jr.; Gaby Hoffmann; Jared Leto; Joe Pantoliano; Power; Raekwon; Claudia Schiffer; William Lee Scott; Brooke Shields; Ben Stiller; Mike Tyson; Elijah Wood
- Cinematography: David Ferrara
- Edited by: Myron Kerstein
- Music by: American Cream Team
- Production company: Palm Pictures
- Distributed by: Screen Gems (through Sony Pictures Releasing)
- Release dates: September 4, 1999 (Telluride); April 5, 2000 (United States)
- Running time: 98 minutes
- Country: United States
- Language: English
- Budget: $12 million
- Box office: $5 million

Black and White is a 1999 American drama film directed by James Toback, and starring Robert Downey Jr., Gaby Hoffmann, Allan Houston, Jared Leto, Scott Caan, Claudia Schiffer, Brooke Shields, Bijou Phillips, and members of the Wu-Tang Clan (Raekwon, Method Man, Ghostface Killah, Oli "Power" Grant, Masta Killa, Bruce Lamar Mayfield "Chip Banks" and Inspectah Deck) and Onyx (Fredro Starr and Sticky Fingaz). The film also features Ben Stiller as a sleazy police detective, as well as Mike Tyson playing himself and Michael B. Jordan in his film debut. It had its first showing at the Telluride Film Festival on September 4, 1999, followed by a second screening at the Toronto International Film Festival on September 15, 1999. It had its theatrical release in the United States on April 5, 2000.

== Plot ==
Rich Bower (Power) is a mover and shaker in the world of rap music (he's involved with a number of other licit and illicit business ventures as well), and his apartment is a favored meeting place for musicians, hangers-on, and hipsters who want to seem cool, including a gang of white kids who want to be on the inside of what they consider the coolest scene of the day. Sam (Shields), a filmmaker, is making a documentary about Rich and his circle, with the help of her husband Terry (Downey), a homosexual who doesn't feel at home in this milieu.

Dean (Houston) is Rich's black friend since childhood and a skilled college basketball player. He is offered a deal by a bookmaker, Mark (Stiller) to throw a game for a price. Dean takes the money against his better judgment, and he soon realizes how much of a mistake he made when Mark turns out to be a cop hoping to dig up dirt on Rich. Rich in turn discovers that Dean might be forced to tell what he knows to stay out of jail, and he decides that Dean has to be killed; however, rather than murder his friend himself, Rich asks one of the white kids who hangs out with him, who seems especially eager to prove himself, to do it for him. The kid, however, is actually the son of the District Attorney.

== Cast ==
- Robert Downey Jr. as Terry Donager
- Stacy Edwards as Sheila King
- Gaby Hoffmann as Raven
- Jared Leto as Casey
- Joe Pantoliano as Bill King
- Bijou Phillips as Charlie
- Power as Rich Bower
- Claudia Schiffer as Greta
- William Lee Scott as Will King
- Brooke Shields as Sam Donager
- Ben Stiller as Detective Mark Clear
- Mike Tyson as Himself
- Elijah Wood as Wren
- Scott Caan as Scotty
- Allan Houston as Dean Carter
- Marla Maples as Muffy
- Raekwon as "Cigar"
- Eddie K. Thomas as Marty King
- Kidada Jones as Jesse
- James Handy as Sergeant Wright
- Frank Adonis as Frank
- Jaime McAdams as James
- Michael B. Jordan as Teen #2
- Ian Somerhalder as Strong Teen Boy

== Production ==
Most of the script was improvised by the cast. All of Claudia Schiffer's lines were completely written.

Because she had not had them done previously, Claudia Schiffer had to have her ears pierced especially for the large hoop earrings worn by her character. In addition to wearing fake dreadlocks, Brooke Shields also wore a nose ring for this film, for which she had her nose temporarily pierced.

== Reception ==
Review aggregate Rotten Tomatoes reports that 39% of critics have given the film a positive review based on 83 reviews; the critical consensus states, "The atmosphere is affecting, and the story, at times, is compelling, but with a lean script and limp direction, Black and White doesn't add up to much." On Metacritic, which assigns an average rating out of 100 based on review s from film critics, the film has a rating score of 47%, aggregating 27 reviews. Roger Ebert gave the film three out of four stars.

In the United States, Black and White grossed $5,241,315 in its four-week release.

== See also ==
- List of American films of 1999
- Black and White (soundtrack)
