= Panic (2000 film) =

2000 American film by Henry Bromell

- DVD cover
- Directed by: Henry Bromell
- Written by: Henry Bromell
- Produced by: Matt Cooper; Andrew Lazar; Lori Miller
- Starring: William H. Macy; Neve Campbell; Tracey Ullman; John Ritter; Barbara Bain; Donald Sutherland
- Cinematography: Jeffrey Jur
- Edited by: Lynzee Klingman; Cindy Mollo; Brent White
- Music by: Brian Tyler
- Production companies: The Vault; Mad Chance Productions
- Distributed by: Artisan Entertainment; Roxie Releasing (United States); Summit Entertainment (Overseas)
- Release dates: January 22, 2000 (Sundance); December 1, 2000 (United States)
- Running time: 88 minutes
- Country: United States
- Language: English
- Box office: $779,137

Panic is a 2000 American crime drama film written and directed by Henry Bromell and starring William H. Macy in the lead role, alongside Neve Campbell, Tracey Ullman, John Ritter, Miguel Sandoval, and Donald Sutherland. The film centers on Alex (Macy), a hitman who suffers a midlife crisis amidst the number of struggles he and his family face. Determined to quit contract killing, he seeks treatment from therapist Dr. John Parks (Ritter) and enters an affair with a younger woman, Sarah Cassidy (Campbell).

Panic premiered at the 2000 Sundance Film Festival, and was later given a limited release in theaters in December of that year. The film received universal acclaim from major film critics, who in particular praised the performances of the acting ensemble.

== Plot ==
Alex lives a double life: he is married with a day job, and is a professional hitman. Trained by his father Michael from youth, Alex is dissatisfied with his work and wishes to leave the business behind. He goes into psychotherapy with Dr. Josh Parks, disclosing that he is a hit man, and that he is attracted to a young woman he met in the waiting room. She is Sarah, 23, who is attracted to him as well, but does not want to get involved with a married man.

In flashbacks we see that Alex gets his start as a killer in the family business, at his father's prompting, from his killing of a squirrel as a young boy, to his first human victim as a teenager. Worried that Alex is informing on him, Michael gives Alex his next assignment: to kill Dr. Parks. Alex delays, while Dr. Parks, fearing for his own safety, contacts a police detective, Larson.

Alex keeps returning to Sarah, calling her, stopping by her apartment, as he decides what to do about the hit, his father, his marriage and his malaise. Eventually, he has an affair with Sarah. His wife soon discovers the affair and leaves him, not before he discovers that his father had been grooming his son, Sammy, as a future assassin. Determined not to let Michael ruin Sammy, too, he drives up to Michael's home and shoots him dead, only to be killed himself by Larson, who had been secretly following him.

== Cast ==
- William H. Macy as Alex
- Neve Campbell as Sarah, Alex's love interest
- Tracey Ullman as Martha, Alex's wife
- John Ritter as Josh, Alex's psychotherapist
- Barbara Bain as Deidre, Alex's mother
- Miguel Sandoval as Detective Larson
- Donald Sutherland as Michael, Alex's father
- Tina Lifford as Dr. Leavitt
- Nicholle Tom as Tracy
- Steve Moreno as Sean
- David Dorfman as Sammy, Alex and Martha's son

== Reception ==
=== Box office ===
Following a premiere at the January 2000 Sundance Film Festival, Panic was given a limited theatrical release (peak of 11 theatres) in the United States and Canada in December 2000, grossing $0.78 million at the box office, against a budget of $1.0 million.

=== Critical response ===
On the review aggregator website Rotten Tomatoes, 91% of 56 critics' reviews are positive, with an average rating of 7.6/10. The website's consensus reads: "This quirky little film about a gangster in therapy feels fresh and well-crafted." Metacritic, which uses a weighted average, assigned the film a score of 77 out of 100, based on 24 critics, indicating "generally favorable" reviews. Roger Ebert gave the film four stars out of four. Leonard Maltin gave the film two and a half stars but praised the acting, calling it "excellent." Lisa Nesselson of Variety wrote "Pic’s title implies frenzy and wild activity, but the film’s charm evolves from its measured, unhurried rhythms, and originality from the tone: quirky yet convincing, irreverent yet moral."
