= Tony Sirico =

American actor (1942–2022)

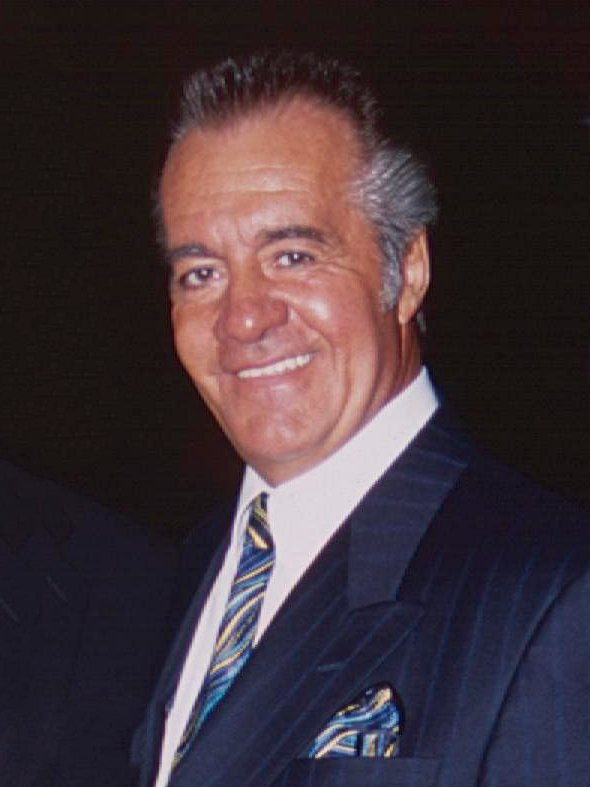
- Sirico in 2000
- Born: Genaro Anthony Sirico (Note: Gennaro is a spelling commonly cited.); July 24, 1942 (Note: July 29, 1942, is a birth date commonly cited.); Brooklyn, New York City, U.S.
- Died: July 8, 2022 (aged 79); Fort Lauderdale, Florida, U.S.
- Resting place: Calvary Cemetery, Queens
- Occupation: Actor
- Years active: 1974–2022
- Children: 2
- Family: Robert Sirico (brother)

Genaro Anthony Sirico Jr. (/sɪˈriːkoʊ/ sih-REE-koh; July 24, 1942 – July 8, 2022) was an American actor. Often cast as a mobster, he is known for portraying Paulie Gualtieri in The Sopranos.

Born in Brooklyn to an Italian-American family, Sirico had a tumultuous early life marked by multiple arrests and periods of imprisonment for crimes including robbery, assault, and extortion. His interest in acting was sparked during a prison sentence, following a visit by an acting troupe of ex-convicts. Sirico's acting career began with minor roles in films such as Crazy Joe. Eventually, it led to significant roles in movies including Goodfellas and Mighty Aphrodite, as well as appearances in six other Woody Allen films.

Aside from his film career, Sirico made contributions to television and animation, voicing characters in The Fairly OddParents and Family Guy. His role in The Sopranos earned him acclaim. Sirico's life off-screen was marked by his service in the United States Army, and his philanthropic efforts, including USO visits to Southwest Asia. He died in 2022, aged 79.

== Early life ==
Sirico was born in Brooklyn, New York City, on July 24, 1942, to a family of Italian descent. He grew up in the East Flatbush and Bensonhurst neighborhoods of Brooklyn, and attended Midwood High School, but did not graduate. Sirico's brother, Robert Sirico, is a Catholic priest and co-founder of the free-market Acton Institute. As a teenager, Sirico was shot in a dispute over a girl. He subsequently served in the United States Army.

Sirico was convicted of several crimes and was arrested 28 times, including for disorderly conduct, assault, and robbery, before taking up acting. In 1967, he served time in prison for the first time as an adult. On February 27, 1970, he was arrested at a restaurant, and found with a .32 caliber revolver on his person. In 1971, he was indicted for extortion, coercion, and felony weapons possession, convicted, and sentenced to four years in prison, of which he served 20 months at Sing Sing.

According to a court transcript at the time of his sentencing, Sirico also had pending charges for criminal possession of a dangerous drug. Sirico stated that his prison was visited by an acting troupe composed of ex-convicts, which inspired him to give acting a try. He appeared in the 1989 documentary The Big Bang by James Toback, in which he discussed his earlier life.

== Career ==
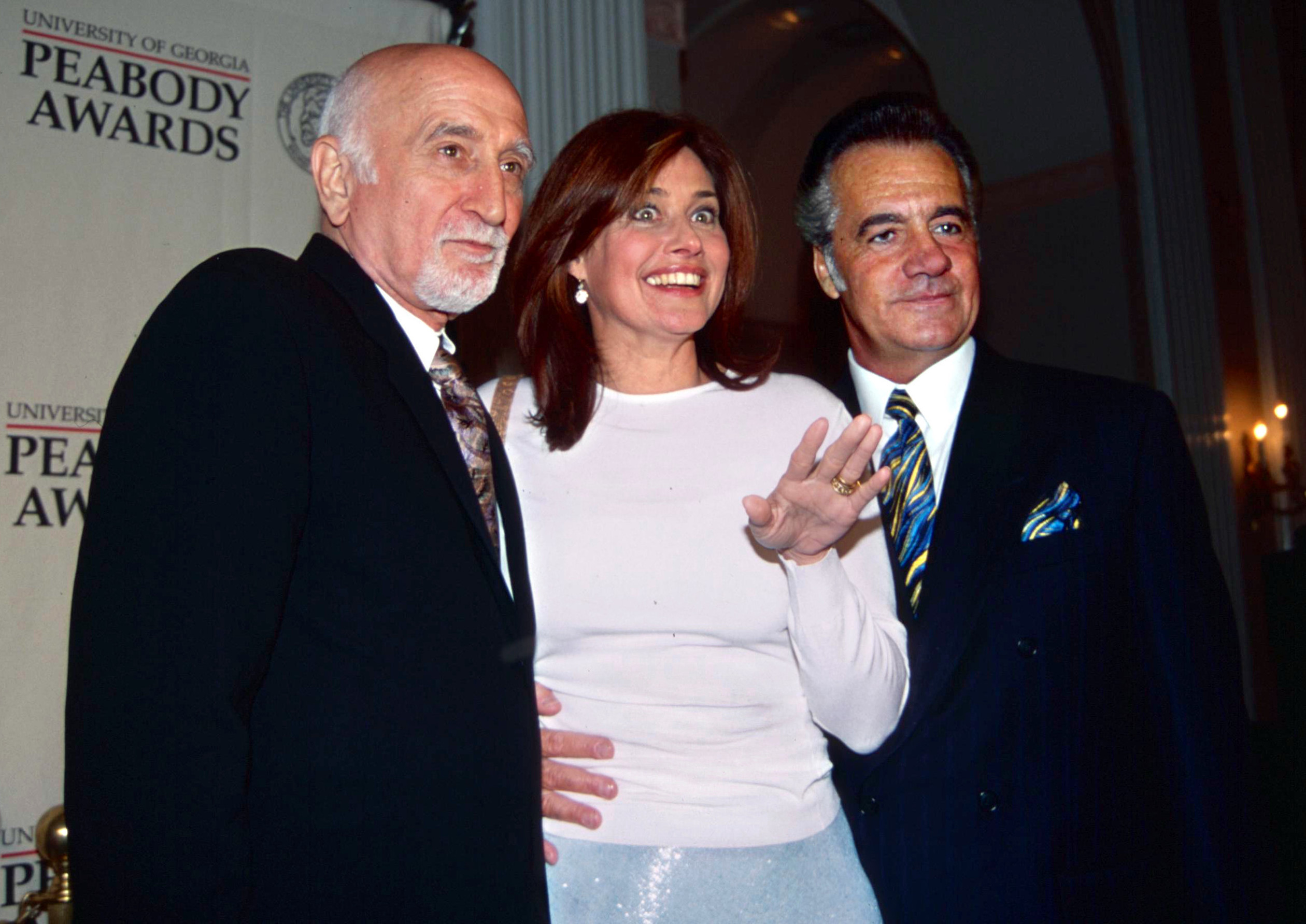
Sirico (right) with Sopranos castmates Dominic Chianese and Lorraine Bracco in 2000.

Sirico's first confirmed role in film was as an extra in the 1974 film Crazy Joe, securing the role with the help of Richard Castellano. Michael Gazzo was Sirico's first acting coach. Sirico played gangsters in a number of films, and made-for-TV films, including Goodfellas, Mob Queen, Mighty Aphrodite, Love and Money, Fingers, The One Man Jury, Defiance, The Last Fight, Innocent Blood, Bullets over Broadway, The Pick-up Artist, Gotti, Witness to the Mob, The Search for One-eye Jimmy, Cop Land, Turn of Faith, Hello Again, Mickey Blue Eyes, and Wonder Wheel. He also played policemen in the films Dead Presidents and Deconstructing Harry. Sirico was a close friend of Woody Allen, and appeared in seven of his films.

Sirico's most acclaimed acting job was that of Paulie Gualtieri in David Chase's Emmy award-winning drama The Sopranos. He originally auditioned for the role of Uncle Junior with Frank Vincent, but Dominic Chianese landed the role. David Chase instead offered him the role of Paulie Gualtieri; Sirico agreed under the condition that his character "would not become a rat".

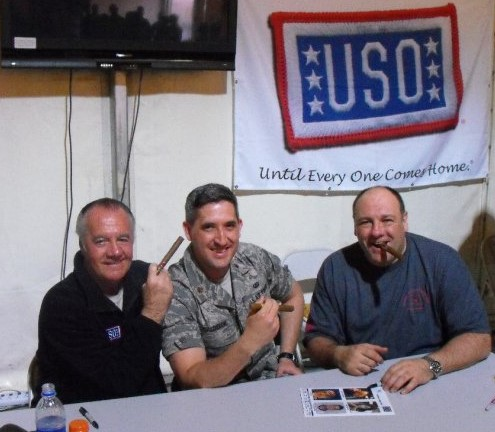
Sirico (left) and James Gandolfini (right) with a member of the U.S. Air Force during a USO visit to Kuwait, 2010

In animation, Sirico provided the voice of "Big Daddy" Fairywinkle in The Fairly OddParents. On Family Guy, he voiced the character of Vinny, who for three episodes in late 2013 was the family's pet dog, replacing Brian Griffin after his death; Brian would later be brought back via time travel. Sirico also made a live-action cameo in the episode "Stewie, Chris, & Brian's Excellent Adventure", where he threatens Stewie, who had insulted Italians, calling them "ridiculous people". Vinny would return in a cameo appearance at the end of the Season 15 premiere, "The Boys in the Band". Sirico would later voice characters on Seth MacFarlane's other animated series American Dad!.

In 2018, he reunited with former Sopranos actors Federico Castelluccio and Vincent Pastore in Sarah Q.

== Personal life ==
Sirico had two children, Joanne and Richard. In 2008, he released a cologne called Paolo Per Uomo.

== Death ==
Sirico died on the afternoon of July 8, 2022, at an assisted living facility in Fort Lauderdale, Florida, at the age of 79. No cause of death was given, but he had been diagnosed with dementia some years before his death. Sirico's funeral mass was held at the Basilica of Regina Pacis, and he was interred at Calvary Cemetery in Queens, New York.

== Filmography ==
=== Film ===
Year	Title	Role	Note
1974	Crazy Joe	Extra	
1974	The Godfather Part II	Rosato Brothers Hood	Uncredited
1978	Hughes and Harlow: Angels in Hell	Frankie Rio	
1978	Fingers	Riccamonza	
1978	The One Man Jury	Charlie "Nuts"	
1980	Defiance	Davey	
1981	So Fine	Associate	
1982	Love and Money	Raoul	
1983	Exposed	Thief	
1983	The Last Fight	Frankie	
1987	The Galucci Brothers	Galucci Brother	
1987	The Pick-up Artist	Patsy Cabaluso	
1987	Hello Again	Tough Guy	
1989	White Hot	Luke	
1989	Cookie	Carmine's Wiseguy	
1989	The Big Bang	Himself	Documentary
1990	Catchfire	Greek Guy	
1990	Goodfellas	Tony "Stacks"	
1991	29th Street	Fortunado	
1992	Innocent Blood	Jacko	
1993	New York Cop	Mr. C	
1993	Romeo Is Bleeding	Malacci	
1994	Men Lie	Porno Witness	
1994	Bullets Over Broadway	Rocco	
1994	The Search for One-eye Jimmy	"Snake"	
1995	Dead Presidents	Officer Spinelli	
1995	Mighty Aphrodite	Boxing Trainer	
1995	Dearly Beloved	Mr. Bedutz	Short film
1996	Everyone Says I Love You	Escaped Convict	
1997	Deconstructing Harry	Police Officer	
1997	Cop Land	Salvatore "Toy" Torillo	
1997	The Deli	Tony	
1997	The Good Life	Junior	Never released
1998	Mob Queen	Joey "The Heart" Aorta	
1998	Celebrity	Lou DeMarco	
1999	Mickey Blue Eyes	Risolli Guard	
2000	It Had to Be You	Ricky Valentino	
2001	Smokin' Stogies	Tony "Batts"	
2002	Turn of Faith	Jimmy	
2008	The Sno Cone Stand Inc	Bob Beasley	
2009	Karma Calling	Lord Ganesh	
2010	Skate	Skate	Short film
2014	Zarra's Law	Tony Zarra	
2014	Friends and Romans	Bobby Musso	
2014	Family on Board	Rocco	Short film
2015	Touched	Anthony	
2016	Café Society	Vito	
2017	Wonder Wheel	Angelo	
2018	Sarah Q	Mr. Danny	
2022	Respect the Jux	Bobby	Posthumous release
TBD	Super Athlete	Coach Lou	Completed, posthumous release

=== Television ===
Year	Title	Role	Notes
1977	Kojak	Greek God	Episode: "Case Without a File"
1982	Police Squad!	Poker Player	Episode: "Ring of Fear (A Dangerous Assignment)"
1989	Miami Vice	Frank Romano	Episode: "Fruit of the Poison Tree"
1989	Perfect Witness	Marco	Television film
1992	In the Shadow of a Killer	Tony Andretti	Television film
1996	Cosby	Teddy	Episode: "Happily Ever Hilton"
1996	Gotti	Joe Dimiglia	Television film
1998	Witness to the Mob	Thomas Gambino	Television film
1998	Vig	Locasso	Television film
1999–2007	The Sopranos	Paul "Paulie Walnuts" Gualtieri	74 episodes
2005	The Fairly OddParents	Big Daddy Fairywinkle	Voice; Episodes: "Talking Trash" and "Big Wanda"
2007	Elmo's Christmas Countdown	Famous Bert	TV special
2008	A Muppets Christmas: Letters to Santa	Mobster	TV special
2010	Chuck	Matty	Episode: "Chuck Versus the Fake Name"
2010	Medium	Big Daddy	Episode: "Bring Your Daughter to Work Day"
2012	Jersey Shore Shark Attack	Captain Salie	Television film
2013–2014	Lilyhammer	Tony Tagliano	Episodes: "2.8: Ghosts" and "3.8: Loose Ends"
2013	Nicky Deuce	Charlie Cement	Television film
2013–2016	Family Guy	Vinny/Himself	Voice; Episodes: "Life of Brian", "Into Harmony's Way", "Christmas Guy", "The Boys in the Band", and "Stewie, Chris & Brian's Excellent Adventure" (live action)
2014	Taxi Brooklyn	Tony	Episode: "Revenge"
2016	The Grinder	Sebastian	Episode: "Grinder v Grinder"
2017–2019	American Dad!	Enzo Perotti / Mobster	Voice; 2 episodes

=== Music videos ===
Year	Song	Artist
1998	"Slang Editorial"	Cappadonna

=== Video games ===
Year	Title	Role	Notes
2006	The Sopranos: Road to Respect	Paulie "Walnuts" Gualtieri	Voice

== Awards and nominations ==
Year	Award	Category	Nominated work	Result
2000	Screen Actors Guild Award	Outstanding Performance by an Ensemble in a Drama Series	The Sopranos	Won
2001	Screen Actors Guild Award	Outstanding Performance by an Ensemble in a Drama Series	The Sopranos	Nominated
2002	Screen Actors Guild Award	Outstanding Performance by an Ensemble in a Drama Series	The Sopranos	Nominated
2003	Screen Actors Guild Award	Outstanding Performance by an Ensemble in a Drama Series	The Sopranos	Nominated
2005	Screen Actors Guild Award	Outstanding Performance by an Ensemble in a Drama Series	The Sopranos	Nominated
2007	Screen Actors Guild Award	Outstanding Performance by an Ensemble in a Drama Series	The Sopranos	Nominated
2008	Screen Actors Guild Award	Outstanding Performance by an Ensemble in a Drama Series	The Sopranos	Won
