= Daniel Bigel =

American film producer (born 1965)

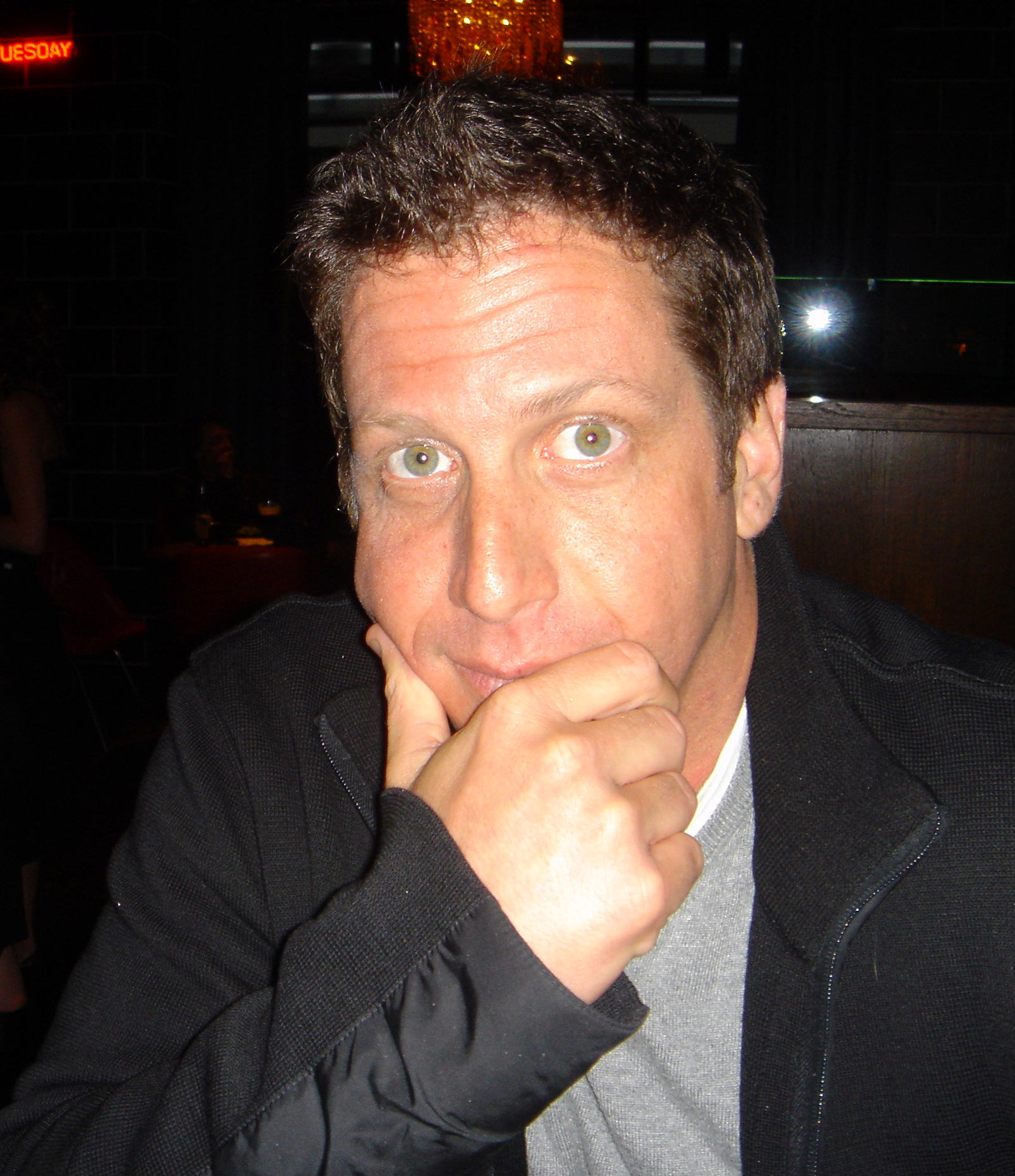
- Daniel Bigel
- Born: June 30, 1965 (age 60); United States
- Occupation: Film producer

Daniel William Bigel is an American film producer (CEO and founder of Bigel Entertainment) who has produced several films including Loverboy directed by and starring Kevin Bacon and Kyra Sedgwick, Empire starring John Leguizamo and Peter Sarsgaard, Two Girls and a Guy and Harvard Man, written and directed by James Toback, which starred, in his first major film production, Adrian Grenier of Entourage fame.

Bigel also co-founded Broadway South, LLC, a company dedicated to rebuilding downtown New Orleans through the creation of a "live entertainment" theater district along Canal Street.

== Filmography ==
He was a producer in all films unless otherwise noted.

=== Film ===
Year	Film	Credit	Notes
1997	Two Girls and a Guy	Executive producer	
1999	Giving It Up		
1999	Black and White		
2000	Catalina Trust	Executive producer	
2000	The Last Producer		
2001	Harvard Man		
2002	Empire		
2003	Lost Junction		
2005	Loverboy		
2005	Devour		Direct-to-video
2014	Fugly!		
