= Sienna Miller =

British actress (born 1981)

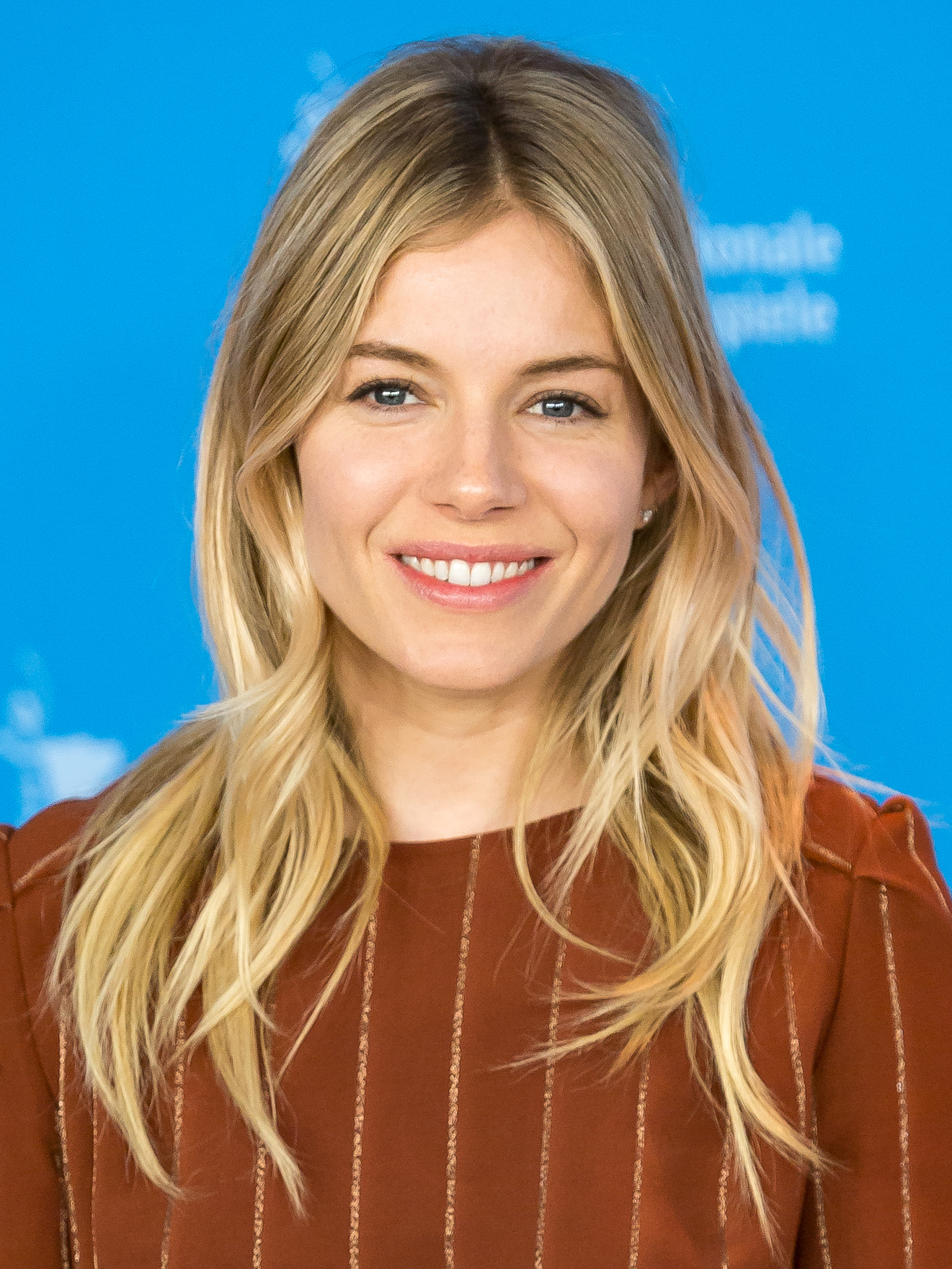
- Miller in 2017
- Born: Sienna Rose Diana Miller; 28 December 1981 (age 44); New York City, U.S.
- Citizenship: United States; United Kingdom
- Occupation: Actress
- Years active: 1999–present
- Children: 3
- Relatives: Savannah Miller (sister); Becki Newton (first cousin once removed); Matt Newton (first cousin once removed); Henry Colton Shumway (great great great grandfather)

Sienna Rose Diana Miller (born 28 December 1981) is a British actress. She began her career as a model, appearing in the pages of Italian Vogue and for the 2003 Pirelli Calendar. Her acting breakthrough came in the 2004 films Layer Cake and Alfie. She portrayed socialite Edie Sedgwick in Factory Girl (2006) and author Caitlin Macnamara in The Edge of Love (2008), and was nominated for the BAFTA Rising Star Award in 2008. Her role as The Baroness in G.I. Joe: The Rise of Cobra (2009) was followed by a brief sabbatical from the screen amid increased tabloid scrutiny.

Miller returned to prominence with her role as actress Tippi Hedren in the 2012 television film The Girl, for which she was nominated for the BAFTA Television Award for Best Actress and the Golden Globe Award for Best Actress – Miniseries or Television Film. She has since starred in several notable films, including Foxcatcher (2014), American Sniper (2014), The Lost City of Z (2016), Live by Night (2016), and American Woman (2018), as well as the miniseries The Loudest Voice (2019) and Anatomy of a Scandal (2022).

== Early life ==
Miller's mother went into labour while watching a performance of The Nutcracker in New York City, so Miller was nearly born in a theatre. She moved to London with her family when she was 18 months old. Miller was a student at the Heathfield School in Ascot, Berkshire. Her father, Edwin Miller, was an American banker who later became an American dealer in Chinese art. Her mother, Josephine, was a British former model who was born in South Africa to British parents, and was a personal assistant to David Bowie and onetime manager of the Lee Strasberg Theatre and Film Institute in New York.

== Acting career ==
=== 2001–2003: Early acting credits ===
Miller's screen debut came in the romantic comedy South Kensington (2001), opposite Rupert Everett and Elle Macpherson. In 2002, she had supporting roles in High Speed and its follow-up The Ride, and guest-starred in The American Embassy and Bedtime. She had a regular role as the combative yet caring flatmate of an NYPD detective in the television drama series Keen Eddie (2003). It was Miller's first exposure to American audiences. FOX cancelled it after only seven episodes.

=== 2004–2008: Breakthrough and tabloid notoriety ===
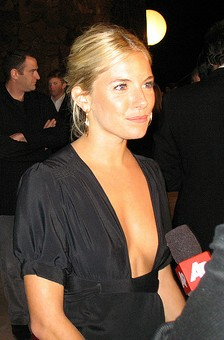
Miller at the 2007 Palm Springs International Film Festival

With roles in two commercial films and a higher public profile due to her relationship with actor Jude Law, 2004 was a turning point for Miller's career. The crime thriller Layer Cake, directed by Matthew Vaughn and starring Daniel Craig, featured her as the love interest of a London-based cocaine supplier. The New York Times called Miller "a new It Girl who barely registers on-screen despite wearing little more than lacey filaments that make her look like a gift meant to be unwrapped very quickly". In Alfie, the remake of Bill Naughton's 1966 film, she played the girlfriend of a cockney limo driver and sex addict (Jude Law). Of her It Girl status, she said at the time: "I'm not very happy about it, to be honest. It makes me uncomfortable because I don't think it's as a result of having a film come out, [but] being scrutinised because of the relationship I'm in".

Miller portrayed a writer of illegal feminist books and the love interest of Giacomo Casanova (Heath Ledger) in the 2005 period dramedy Casanova. It made $37.6 million, and Entertainment Weekly, in a favorable review, wrote: "Ms. Miller has a modern, smart-girl look about her; her Francesca is neither too tough to melt nor too glittering from the Emma Thompson school of smarties". Also in 2005 she made her West End debut in a revival of As You Like It at the Wyndhams Theatre playing Celia, the lesser cousin to Rosalind, receiving generally lukewarm observation yet one caustic review came from Paul Taylor of The Independent. He wrote: "She approaches an emotion with the finesse of someone beating a carpet" and that she "brings to it all the ripe professional stage experience that can be mustered from appearing in three movies".

Miller took on the role of 1960s socialite and Andy Warhol's muse Edie Sedgwick in the 2006 biographical drama Factory Girl. Johnny Vaughan of Sun Online concluded, "[i]t's Sienna Miller's star that shines brightest in this heartbreaking cautionary tale", but Rotten Tomatoes' critical consensus reads: "Despite a dedicated performance by Sienna Miller, Factory Girl delves only superficially into her character, and ultimately fails to tell a coherent story." In 2007, Miller had a role as the love interest of a young man from a fictional British town in Matthew Vaughn's adaptation Stardust, and played a starlet in Steve Buscemi's Interview, a remake of Dutch filmmaker Theo van Gogh's 2003 movie of the same name. Budgeted at $65 million, Stardust grossed $137 million worldwide, while critics felt that Buscemi's and Miller's "captivating performances" in Interview made "a seemingly simple premise gripping and entertaining".

In The Mysteries of Pittsburgh (2008), a film adaptation of Michael Chabon's novel, Miller played a woman romantically involved with a rebellious bisexual man. It premiered at the Sundance Film Festival and received a limited release. She created a minor stir in Pittsburgh when, in a 2006 interview with Rolling Stone, she called the city "Shitsburgh", saying, "Can you believe this is my life? Will you pity me when you're back in your funky New York apartment and I'm still in Pittsburgh? I need to get more glamorous films and stop with my indie year." Miller was parodied in Pittsburgh media (including one article headlined "Semi-famous actress dumps on the 'Burgh") and criticised for making what was seen as an unnecessarily disparaging remark, given the special treatment the film's cast and crew had received from the visitors' bureau and other city offices. Miller apologised and said her remarks were taken out of context.

In the 2008 British biographical drama The Edge of Love, Miller appeared alongside Keira Knightley as Caitlin Macnamara, the wife of poet Dylan Thomas. Despite a mixed critical reception, The Hollywood Reporter critic Ray Bennett wrote that it was a "wonderfully atmospheric tale of love and war", and that "the film belongs to the women, with Knightley going from strength to strength (and showing she can sing!) and Miller again proving that she has everything it takes to be a major movie star." Miller earned a BIFA nomination for Best Supporting Actress for her performance. She also voiced a circus fox in the animated film A Fox's Tale (2008) and played an undead newlywed in the romantic comedy Camille.

=== 2009–2011: Screen hiatus ===
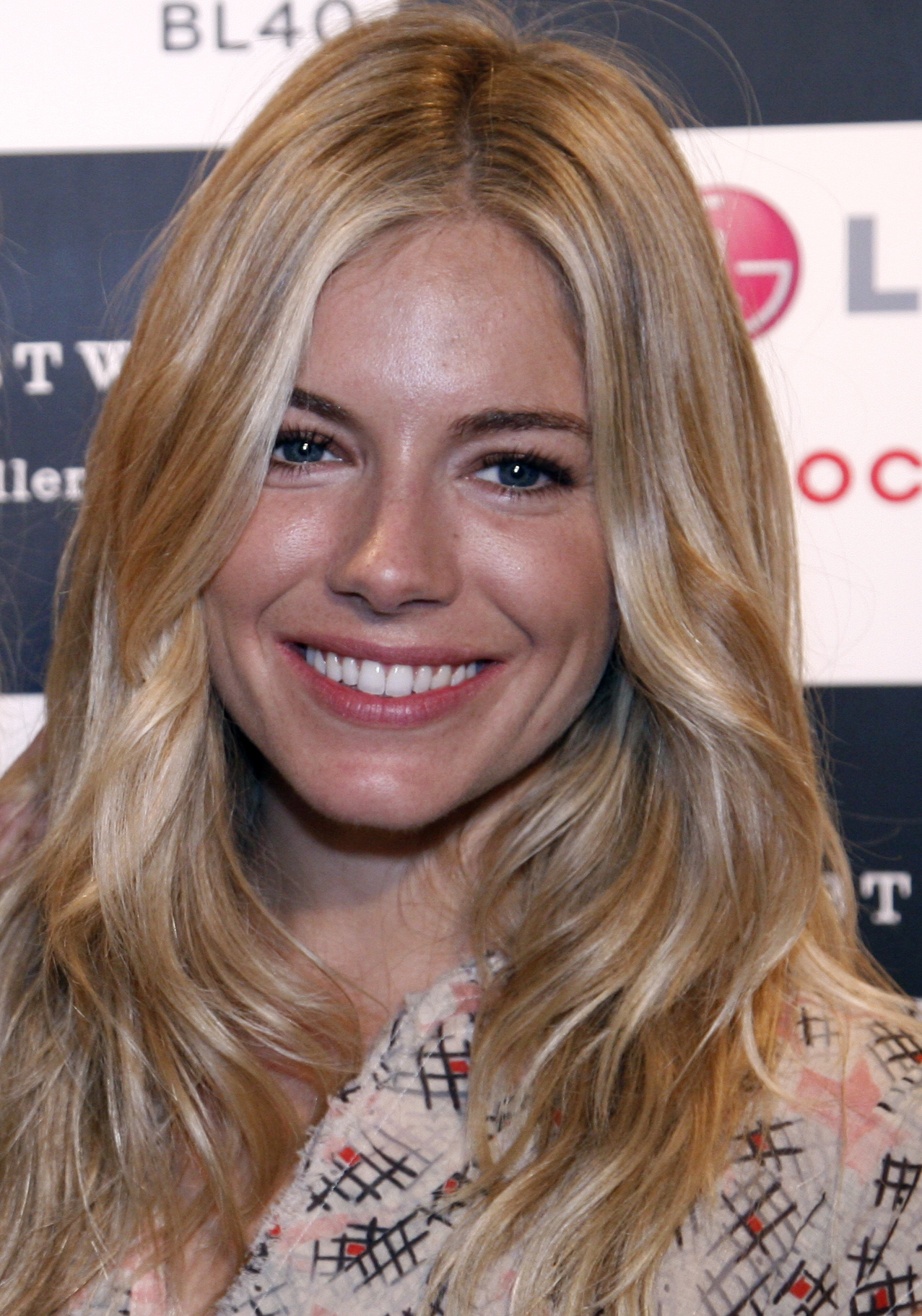
Miller in 2009

Miller was cast as The Baroness in the live-action film adaptation of the G.I. Joe franchise G.I. Joe: The Rise of Cobra (2009), her first—and to date, only—mainstream Hollywood blockbuster. She auditioned because it did not involve "having a breakdown or [being] addicted to heroin or dying at the end, something that was just maybe really great fun and that people went to see and actually just had a great time seeing." She sprained her wrist after slipping on a rubber bullet while filming a fight scene with Rachel Nichols. G.I. Joe was not well received by most critics, but made $302.5 million worldwide.

The Irish Independent observed that Miller's professional trajectory had reached "its lowest ebb" with G.I. Joe, an experience that "convinced her she had well and truly lost her way"; in an interview with UK's Esquire magazine, she said that roles dried up because "people don't want to see films with people they don't approve of in them".

She opted to take a hiatus from films for the next two years and work in theater instead. She later said, "I was sick of myself, to be honest, or sick of that perception of me. It all felt so fucking dirty".

In 2009, Miller played the title role in Patrick Marber's After Miss Julie on Broadway. She told The New York Times: "This is what I have always wanted, to be on Broadway. I'm living my dream, and that's all you can ask for. At a certain point, you have to ignore all the rest". On her performance, The Guardian stated: "Miller masters it intermittently—an accomplishment, however incomplete." She starred as a former starlet caught up in a love-triangle in Trevor Nunn's 2011 production of Flare Path at London's Theatre Royal Haymarket.

=== 2012–2017: Resurgence ===
After her professional slump, Miller experienced what journalists called a "career revival". She played more complex, dramatic parts in a series of critically acclaimed films. "All the directors speak to each other," she said in an interview. "And once you crack that upper echelon of incredible directors, you've got people rooting for you. People who people listen to. I've never had that before".

In The Girl (2012), an HBO and BBC film, Miller portrayed actress Tippi Hedren, the muse of director Alfred Hitchcock. As part of her research, Miller (who was in the early stages of pregnancy) spoke to Hedren several times during filming, and they became friends. Live birds were used for the recreation of the attic scene in Hitchcock's The Birds. Miller told the Radio Times, "I did go through a bird attack for two hours. It pales in comparison to what [Hedren] was subjected to, but it was pretty horrible. There were men off-camera with boxes of birds, throwing seagulls and pigeons in my face". The film received mixed reviews, but the Daily Mirror's Jane Simon wrote: "[G]liding gracefully through it all (and with an impeccable American accent) Sienna Miller brings untouchable beauty and icy glamour, but also captures the extraordinary resilience Hedren must have had to withstand everything Hitchcock threw at her." Writing for The Telegraph, Clive James said "[a] better choice [to play Hedren] could not have been made than Sienna Miller, who is even lovelier than Hedren was". She garnered nominations for the BAFTA Television Award for Best Actress and the Golden Globe Award for Best Actress – Miniseries or Television Film. In 2012, she also played a socialite in the dramedy Two Jacks, the hysterical sister of an elementary teacher in the drama Yellow, and a housewife who aspires to complete in a belly-dance competition in the made-for-television film Just like a Woman.

In 2014, Miller portrayed Nancy Schultz, the wife of murdered Olympic gold medal-winning wrestler Dave Schultz, in Bennett Miller's Foxcatcher, and Taya Renae Kyle, the wife of United States Navy SEAL sniper Chris Kyle, in Clint Eastwood's American Sniper. Both films were highly acclaimed, and American Sniper emerged as the highest-grossing war film of all time. In 2015, she took on the roles of a prostitute in the road drama Mississippi Grind, the former boss of a hard-working small business owner in the comedy Unfinished Business, a single mother in the dystopian film High-Rise, and that of a sous-chef in the drama Burnt, which reunited her with Bradley Cooper. For High-Rise, she received a BIFA nomination for Best Supporting Actress. Miller also took the role of Sally Bowles in the Broadway revival of Cabaret after Emma Stone's scheduled departure from the production and performed for the last six weeks of the show's engagement, in February and March 2015. The New York Daily News praised her "cocky and steely" performance and wrote that her approach to the role "works well in the Kander and Ebb songs 'Don't Tell Momma' and 'Perfectly Marvelous'." She was selected to be on the jury for the main competition section of the 2015 Cannes Film Festival.

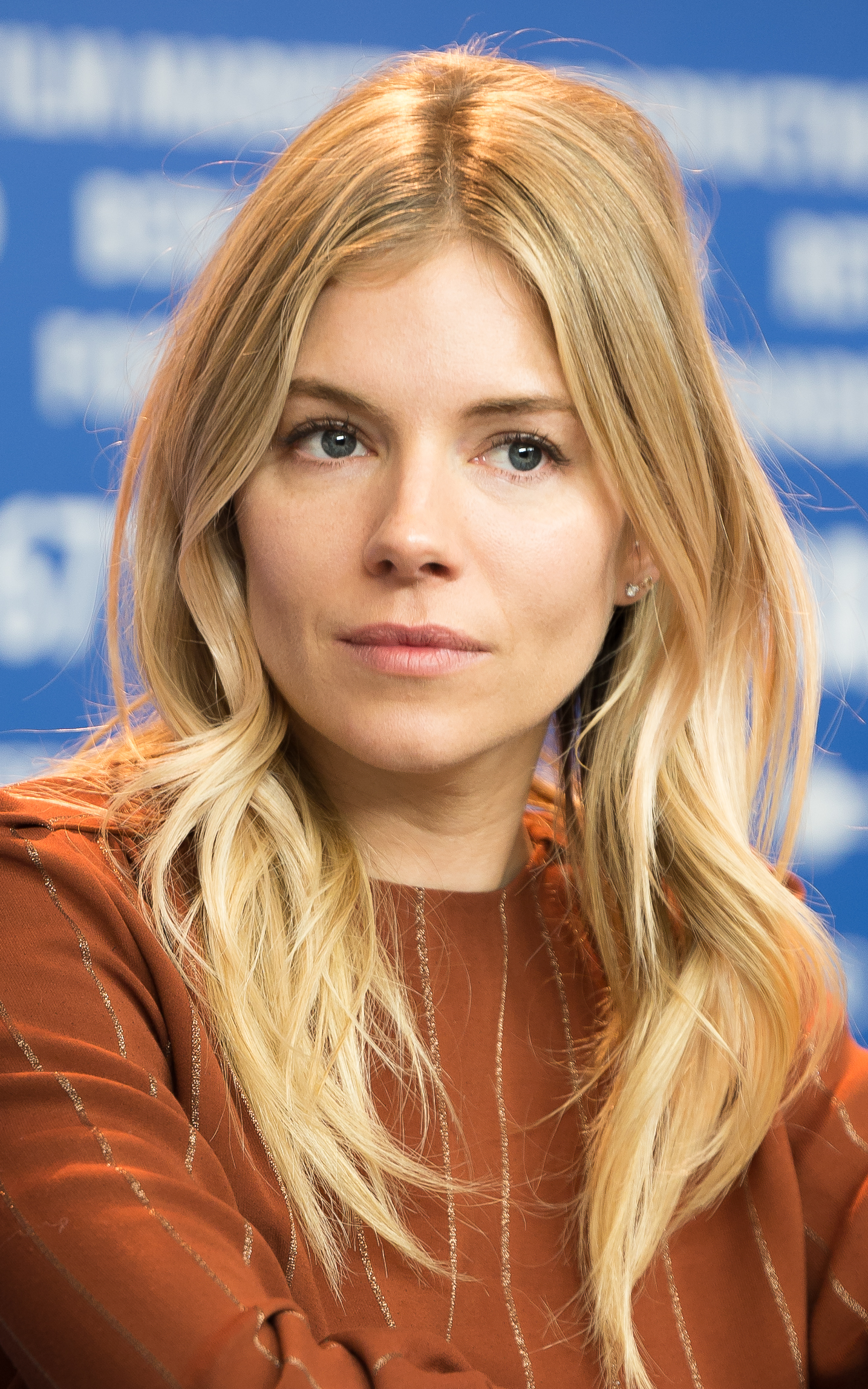
Miller at the 2017 Berlin International Film Festival

Miller appeared in Paramount Pictures and Plan B Entertainment's adaptation of The Lost City of Z (2016), directed by James Gray, portraying Nina Fawcett, the wife of British geographer Percy Fawcett. The New York Times called her "wonderful" in her role, while Time described her as "luminous and astute". In Ben Affleck's period crime drama Live by Night (2016), Miller played the mistress of a notorious gangster and the love interest of a World War I veteran. In 2017, Miller starred in the drama The Private Life of a Modern Woman, which screened out of competition at the 74th Venice International Film Festival, and in a West End production of the Tennessee Williams classic Cat on a Hot Tin Roof, at the Apollo Theatre.

=== Since 2018 ===
In 2018, Miller appeared in the war film The Catcher Was a Spy as Estella, the girlfriend of Moe Berg, a catcher for the Boston Red Sox who joined the OSS during World War II, as well as the drama American Woman, in which she portrays a single mother faced with raising her grandson after her daughter goes missing under mysterious circumstances. American Woman, which gave Miller some of the best reviews of her career, was her first role as the main character not bolstered by any other actors, and marked the first time she was able to delve into a woman character's life in "nuanced ways". Miller remarked: "These opportunities have been few and far between, and that's intrinsic to being a woman in film. I think it's quite rare; not necessarily specific to me, but at 37 years old, I'm thrilled I've had this opportunity. I've done good supporting work in fantastic films and had to work very hard to show something in smaller moments. I loved being able to have the space and time to really do everything I want to with a character".

Miller starred as a narcotics detective in the 2019 action film 21 Bridges alongside Chadwick Boseman. The Guardian wrote that she was "vocally channelling Edie Falco from The Sopranos", and with a worldwide gross of $50 million, the film was a moderate commercial success. She next took the role of Beth Ailes, the wife of television executive Roger Ailes (played by Russell Crowe), in the miniseries The Loudest Voice (2019), which aired on Showtime. Miller struggled to find material on which to base her performance aside from the script and Gabriel Sherman's book The Loudest Voice in the Room. During an interview with Entertainment Weekly, she said: "There's very little footage of her that I had access to. But there were these two speeches which she gave, which were on YouTube, and another little interview, so I really kind of based my research around that, and relied on the script because there's just not a lot of information on her out there. But the interview and the speeches I found really revealing".

In February 2024, she joined the short film Marion as an executive producer.

== Other endeavours ==
=== Modelling ===
Before her professional acting career, Miller worked as a photography model. She signed with Tandy Anderson of Select Model Management London, and modelled for Coca-Cola, Italian Vogue, and posed topless in the 2003 Pirelli Calendar. She went on to appear on the covers of Vogue's American, British, Australian and Portuguese editions, as well as other international fashion magazines such as Nylon, Marie Claire, and Porter Edit.

Miller signed a two-year contract with Madrid-based denim label Pepe Jeans London. The first ad campaign appeared on magazines in March 2006 and was shot by photographer Mikael Jansson and stylist Karl Templer. In February 2009, Hugo Boss Fragrances announced that she would be the new ambassador for their BOSS Orange women's perfume. In March 2016, she announced as the new face of Swedish fashion chain Lindex, starring in the 1970s-inspired Sienna Hearts Lindex spring campaign. Miller appeared as a guest at a Rome retro-styled dinner party in Gucci's Cruise 2020 campaign, which was directed and photographed by American film director Harmony Korine.

=== Fashion design ===
In 2007, Miller, along with her sister Savannah, a fashion designer, launched a complete fashion label. Called Twenty8Twelve, it gets its name from Miller's birthdate and is financially backed by Pepe Jeans. The sisters remained at the helm of the label until 2012, when they announced they were stepping down as co-creative directors.

=== Charity ===
Miller is the Global Ambassador for the International Medical Corps. She travelled with them to the Democratic Republic of the Congo in April 2009 and blogged about the experience. She also visited Haiti with the group after the 2010 Haiti earthquake. Miller also worked alongside Global Cool during their 2007 eco-friendly campaign.

Miller is an ambassador for the UK branch of the Starlight Children's Foundation, which works with seriously ill children and their parents. On 1 July 2007, she appeared as a speaker at the Concert for Diana held at Wembley Stadium, London to celebrate the life of Princess Diana almost 10 years after her death. Proceeds from the concert went to Diana's charities as well as to charities of which her sons Princes William and Harry are patrons.

== Public image ==
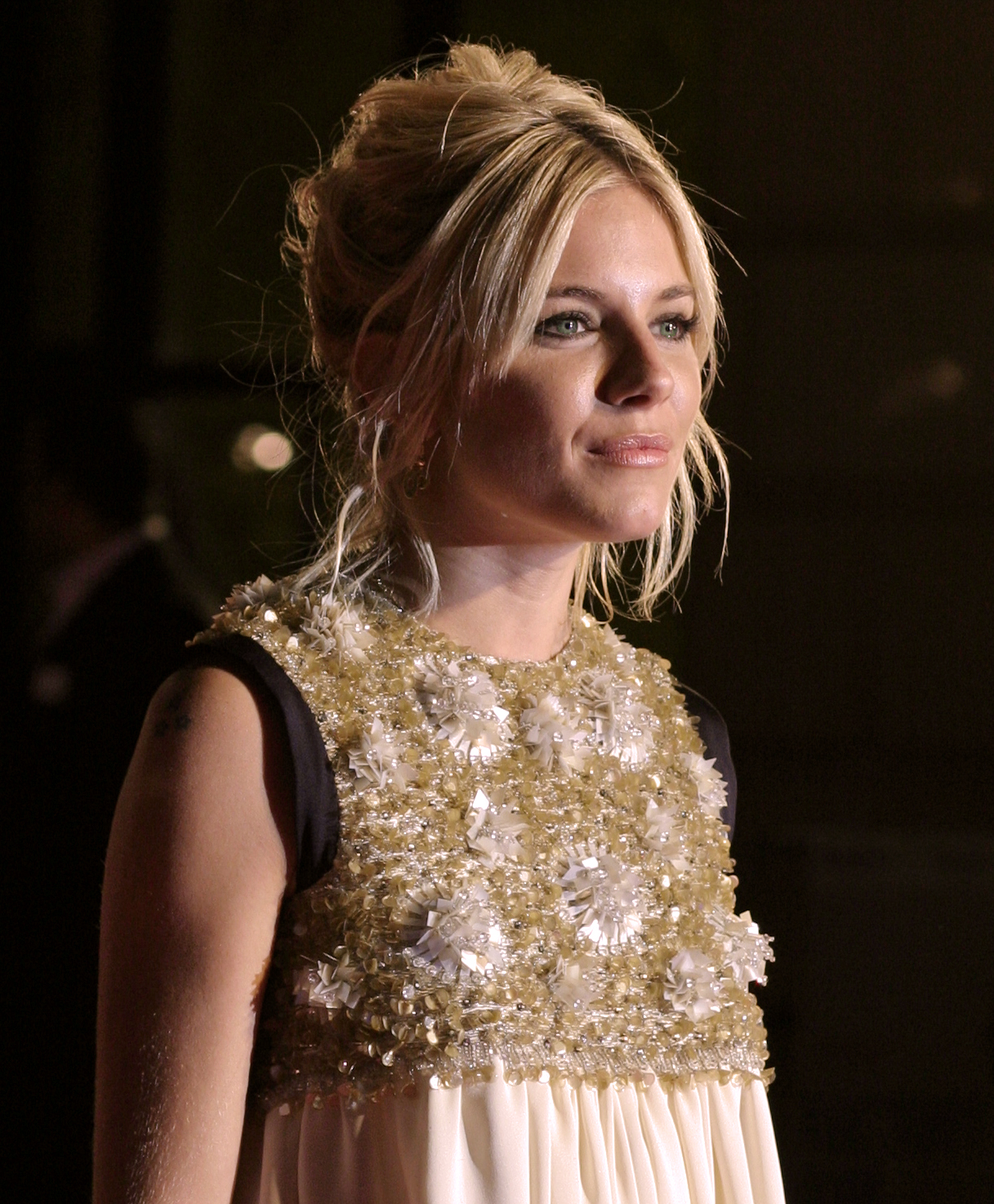
Miller at the 2007 London premiere of Factory Girl

Miller's relationship with Jude Law, after they starred together in the 2004 film Alfie, brought both her and her style of dress to media headlines in the mid-2000s. In December 2004, Vogue featured Miller on its cover and called her "the girl of the year".

Miller has been closely associated with the style of fashion known as boho chic. She told Vogue she had a laid-back approach to grooming, including cutting her own hair. Miller has adopted other styles of dress and her shorter, bobbed hairstyle—a feature of bohemian fashion in the 1920s—

In the late 2000s, Miller was better known for her tabloid persona and fashion sense than her professional work. The Irish Independent wrote in 2015 that "she was one of the most famous young actresses of her generation, but still boasted precious little credibility in the industry". In a 2017 interview with The Sydney Morning Herald, she said: "I definitely feel like I'm in a place now where people are more focused on my career than on my private life and clothes, which is refreshing. There's not the same drama around me that there was".

Miller has appeared in several magazines' lists of the world's most beautiful women. She ranked 48th, 46th, 11th, 27th, and 51st in Maxim magazine's Hot 100 Women in 2005, 2006, 2007, 2008, and 2009, respectively. She ranked 86th and 2nd in Askmen's top 99 "most desirable" women lists of 2005 and 2006. She was also 63rd in FHM magazine's "100 Sexiest Women in the World" 2006 supplement.

== Personal life ==
=== Relationships ===
On Christmas Day 2004, Miller became engaged to her Alfie co-star Jude Law. On 18 July 2005, Law issued a public apology to Miller for having an affair with his children's nanny. After attempting to salvage their relationship, Miller and Law separated in November 2006. During their relationship, tabloids leaked news of Miller's pregnancy, which she ultimately aborted. In 2008, Miller had a highly publicised affair with married actor Balthazar Getty. She later sued two British tabloids for publishing photos of her and Getty together.

In December 2009, it was reported that Law and Miller had rekindled their relationship after starring in separate shows on Broadway in late 2009. They spent Christmas 2009 in Barbados with three of Law's children. They announced they had split again in February 2011.

From 2011 to 2015, Miller dated and became engaged to actor Tom Sturridge, with whom she has a daughter, who was born on 8 July 2012.

Miller began dating actor Oli Green in late 2021. Their daughter was born in December 2023. They were seen together at the Oasis concert in July 2025 at Wembley Stadium. On 1 December 2025, Miller revealed she was expecting her third child. She gave birth to a son at the end of April 2026.

=== Phone hacking scandal ===
Following a High Court hearing in May 2011, Miller was awarded £100,000 in damages from News of the World after the newspaper admitted hacking into her phone. Later, as a core participant, she gave evidence to the Leveson Inquiry in November 2011, including the following:

I would often find myself almost daily, I was 21, at midnight running down a dark street on my own with 10 big men chasing me. The fact that they had cameras in their hands meant that was legal. But if you take away the cameras, what have you got? You've got a pack of men chasing a woman, and obviously that's a very intimidating situation to be in.

In November 2021, Miller accepted a financial settlement from News Group Newspapers, publishers of The Sun, over an alleged phone hacking. Her lawyer David Sherborne told the court the payout is "tantamount" to an admission of illegal activity by The Sun. Outside the High Court on 9 December 2021, Miller said of The Sun newspaper, "They very nearly ruined my life. I have certainly seen how they have ruined the lives of others."

She is played by Georgia Jay in the 2025 ITV drama about the News International phone hacking scandal, The Hack.

== Filmography ==
=== Film ===
Year	Title	Role	Notes
2001	South Kensington	Sharon	Credited as Sienna Rose
2002	High Speed	Savannah	
2002	The Ride	Sara	
2004	Layer Cake	Tammy	
2004	Alfie	Nikki	
2005	Casanova	Francesca Bruni	
2006	Factory Girl	Edie Sedgwick	
2007	Interview	Katya	
2007	Stardust	Victoria	
2008	The Mysteries of Pittsburgh	Jane Bellwether	
2008	Camille	Camille Foster	
2008	A Fox's Tale	Darcey	Voice role
2008	The Edge of Love	Caitlin Macnamara	
2009	The September Issue	Herself	Documentary
2009	G.I. Joe: The Rise of Cobra	The Baroness	
2012	Just Like a Woman	Marilyn	
2012	Nous York	Movie star	
2012	Two Jacks	Diana	
2012	Yellow	Xanne	
2013	A Case of You	Sarah	
2014	Foxcatcher	Nancy Schultz	
2014	American Sniper	Taya Renae Kyle	
2015	Mississippi Grind	Simone	
2015	Unfinished Business	Chuck Portnoy	
2015	High-Rise	Charlotte Melville	
2015	Black Mass	Catherine Greig	Deleted scenes
2015	Burnt	Helene	
2016	The Lost City of Z	Nina Fawcett	
2016	Live by Night	Emma Gould	
2017	An Imperfect Murder	Vera Lockman	also known as The Private Life of a Modern Woman
2018	The Catcher Was a Spy	Estella Huni	
2018	American Woman	Deborah Callahan	
2019	21 Bridges	Detective Frankie Burns	
2020	Wander Darkly	Adrienne	
2023	My Mother's Wedding	Victoria	
2024	Horizon: An American Saga – Chapter 1	Frances Kittredge	
2024	Horizon: An American Saga – Chapter 2	Frances Kittredge	
2026	Jack Ryan: Ghost War	Emma Marlow	
2026	Madden	Carol Davis	
TBA	Horizon: An American Saga – Chapter 3	Frances Kittredge	Filming

=== Television ===
Year	Title	Role	Notes
2002	The American Embassy	Babe	Episode: "Long Live the King"
2002	Bedtime	Stacey	4 episodes
2003–2004	Keen Eddie	Fiona Bickerton	Main role
2009	Top Gear	Herself	2 episodes
2012	The Girl	Tippi Hedren	Television film
2019	The Loudest Voice	Beth Ailes	Miniseries
2022	Anatomy of a Scandal	Sophie Whitehouse	Main role; Netflix miniseries
2022	Chivalry	Lark	Main role; Channel 4 series
2022	My Life as a Rolling Stone	Narrator	Documentary series
2023	Extrapolations	Rebecca Shearer	Main role
2024	Curb Your Enthusiasm	Herself	3 episodes
2026	War	Carla Duval	Main role

== Theatre ==
Year	Title	Role	Notes
2005	As You Like It	Celia	Wyndham's Theatre, West End
2009	After Miss Julie	Miss Julie	American Airlines Theatre, Broadway
2011	Flare Path	Patricia	Theatre Royal Haymarket, West End
2015	Cabaret	Sally Bowles; Third replacement	Studio 54, Broadway
2017	Cat on a Hot Tin Roof	Margaret	Apollo Theatre, West End

== Awards and nominations ==
Year	Award	Category	Film	Result
2007	Environmental Media Awards	EMA Futures Award	—N/a	Won
2007	Independent Spirit Awards	Best Female Lead	Interview	Nominated
2007	London Film Critics' Circle	British Actress of the Year	Interview	Nominated
2008	BAFTA Film Awards	Rising Star Award	—N/a	Nominated
2008	British Independent Film Awards	Best Supporting Actress	The Edge of Love	Nominated
2009	ShoWest Awards	Best Supporting Actress	The Edge of Love	Won
2009	Golden Raspberry Awards	Worst Supporting Actress	G.I. Joe: The Rise of Cobra	Won
2012	Golden Globe Awards	Best Actress – Miniseries or Television Film	The Girl	Nominated
2012	BAFTA TV Award	BAFTA TV Award for Best Actress	The Girl	Nominated
2012	Satellite Awards	Best Actress – Miniseries or Television Film	The Girl	Nominated
2013	Critics' Choice Television Awards	Best Movie/Miniseries Supporting Actress	The Girl	Nominated
2015	Denver Film Critics Society	Best Supporting Actress	American Sniper	Nominated
2015	British Independent Film Awards	Best Supporting Actress	High-Rise	Nominated
2019	FCAD Deauville, France American Film Festival Awards	Film Talent Award	American Woman	Won
2019	SCAD Savannah, Georgia Film Festival Awards	Film Talent Award	American Woman	Won
2020	Television Humanitarian Awards, Creative Coalition	Global Ambassador IMC	—N/a	Won
