= Two Girls and a Guy =

1997 film by James Toback

- Theatrical release poster
- Directed by: James Toback
- Written by: James Toback
- Produced by: Daniel Bigel; Chris Hanley; Michael Mailer; Gretchen McGowan; Edward R. Pressman
- Starring: Robert Downey Jr.; Heather Graham; Natasha Gregson Wagner
- Cinematography: Barry Markowitz
- Edited by: Alan Oxman
- Music by: Stewart Copeland
- Production company: Edward R. Pressman Productions
- Distributed by: Fox Searchlight Pictures
- Release date: September 9, 1997
- Running time: 84 minutes
- Country: United States
- Language: English
- Budget: $1 million
- Box office: $2 million

Two Girls and a Guy is a 1997 American black comedy-drama film written and directed by James Toback and produced by Edward R. Pressman and Chris Hanley. It stars Robert Downey Jr., Heather Graham and Natasha Gregson Wagner.

The film is mainly based upon dialogue between the characters. It occurs almost entirely in real time, and within a single setting, leading some reviewers to compare the film to a stage play.

Director James Toback told interviewers he wrote the film's screenplay in only four days and shot the film in eleven days.

== Plot ==
Two women, Carla and Lou, meet on the street outside a loft waiting for their boyfriends. After a short time, they find out that they are waiting for the same man – young actor Blake, who said that he loves both of them but had actually been leading a double life for several months. Angry, they break into his loft and when he returns, a round of accusations and explanations begins.

== Cast ==
- Robert Downey Jr. as Blake Allen
- Heather Graham as Carla Bennett
- Natasha Gregson Wagner as Lou
- Frederique van der Wal as Carol
- Angel David as Tommy

== Production ==
=== Casting ===
Robert Downey Jr. had previously worked with director James Toback on the 1987 film The Pick-Up Artist. Alongside The Gingerbread Man, Two Girls and a Guy was Downey Jr.'s first role after a 1996 drug arrest. Toback wrote the film's screenplay in response to seeing Downey Jr. handcuffed on television. He remembered, "I felt bad for him but at the same time I thought, when he gets out of rehab, it’ll be a good time to try something bold and ambitious with him."

It has been reported that Downey Jr. was drug-tested on the set every day, and that roles such as this helped him temporarily stay clean before his eventual relapse in September 1997. He relapsed while shooting the film In Dreams, for the then-new DreamWorks Pictures. The relapse would coincide with Two Girls and a Guy's premiere on the festival circuit, and Downey Jr. ended up being arrested again in December 1997. Toback said in 1998, "I was worried that he wouldn’t get out. Either he’d be killed or commit suicide, one or the other. I mean, I think he is ideally unsuited to incarceration. He is an exuberant, gentle, free spirit. His violence is all verbal. He is not looking to get into fights with people. There is just about nobody I could think of — physically, emotionally, psychologically — who is less qualified to handle jail."

In a 1998 interview with People magazine, Natasha Gregson Wagner implied she accepted the role of Louise (nicknamed Lou in the film) because she wanted to appear in unconventional or controversial pictures, stating that "I like working with bold people who want to make an impact. I’m not interested in being just another pretty face." In 1997, Gregson Wagner had also appeared in David Lynch's Lost Highway, and several independent features, including the NC-17 rated experimental drama film Glam. Heather Graham said in a 2024 interview that she did the film since she enjoyed appearing in independent pictures. About Downey Jr., Graham said, "that was right around the time that he just had been doing a lot of drugs, and I think he was being tested like almost every day. This was before he became the massive success he is today. He was famous, and everybody knew who he was, but he was going through like, a rocky period. But he's a super charismatic person. He's such an interesting, cool, charismatic guy."

In 2018, Natasha Leggero alleged on Jimmy Kimmel Live! that Toback sexually harassed her under the guise of potentially casting her for Two Girls and a Guy.

=== Filming and post-production ===
Principal photography began during 1997 in New York City. Before filming started, Gregson Wagner convinced director Toback to remove a scene he originally wanted where her character masturbated to Downey Jr. and Heather Graham having sex, as she believed it was not realistic.

A scene where Downey Jr. is interrogated by the two female leads while in a bathroom was improvised and co-written by the actors. Toback said at the time, "for anyone who’s looking to understand Robert’s past, present, and future, all you really have to do is look at that scene, and that’s the answer." On the set of the film, Toback's only directions for Downey Jr. were: "delight me, amuse me, fascinate me, frighten me, horrify me, engage me." Toback said, "that’s what he wants to hear, and he will deliver." Downey Jr. later recalled that, "I knew Toback would give me the freedom to let my spirit go."

In order for the film to receive an R-rating rather than an NC-17 rating, the sex scene involving Downey Jr. and Graham was toned down and re-edited. Both cuts have since been made available on home media.

== Release and home media ==
In the fall of 1997, Two Girls and a Guy was shown at the Toronto International Film Festival, and the Telluride Film Festival in Colorado. Originally an independent film, it was picked up by 20th Century Fox's indie division Fox Searchlight Pictures for a theatrical run in April 1998.

In the United States, It would be released to VHS, LaserDisc, and DVD in the late 1990s and early 2000s by 20th Century Fox Home Entertainment, and was subsequently released on a Blu-ray by the company in late 2009, which includes both the R-rated and NC-17 versions. The Blu-ray edition includes a commentary track with Downey Jr., Gregson Wagner and Toback that originally appeared on Fox's 2002 DVD release, as well as a 21-minute interview with Toback that was exclusive to the Blu-ray release. In Europe (Region 2), the film received a British VHS release from Fox, and a dubbed Czech VHS (released in association with Vapet Productions). In Region 4, the film received no home video releases from Fox's Australian home video arm 20th Century Fox Home Entertainment South Pacific, despite the film receiving an Australian theatrical release in early 1999.

In 2019, Disney acquired most of 21st Century Fox's assets from Rupert Murdoch, including Fox Searchlight (which was renamed Searchlight Pictures). However, it is unclear how much of the film's rights were transferred to Disney, as it was produced entirely by a third-party (with the end credits' copyright notice reading "© 1997 Two Girls Inc", having no mention of Twentieth Century Fox Film Corporation). It was not made available on any of Disney's streaming platforms.

== Reception ==
On Rotten Tomatoes the film has a critic rating of 50% from 62 reviews, with an average rating of 5.66/10. The site's consensus reads, "Two Girls and a Guy has an intriguing premise and a talented trio of leads, but doesn't do quite enough with any of them to make the end result truly worth a watch". Metacritic, which uses a weighted average, assigned the film a score of 66 out of 100, based on 22 critics, indicating "generally favorable" reviews.

In September 1997, Todd McCarthy of Variety labelled it "a lively, if slender, perpetuation of the battle between the sexes on a modern battleground", adding, "critical reaction will no doubt run the gamut for this sexually frank, exploratory piece, with its box office fate hanging in the balance of whether the resulting controversy makes it a priority for young discriminating viewers or a turn-off, especially among women." Regarding Downey Jr., McCarthy said he "shifts into various emotional modes with dazzling speed and dexterity." Writing from the 1997 Telluride Film Festival, Entertainment Weekly's Chris Willman said that the film received a "polarized response", claiming that some saw it as an endorsement of infidelity. However, he noted that "mass walkouts were reserved for 23-year-old Kids scribe Harmony Korine’s directorial debut, Gummo, another verite parade of teens behaving badly (and killing cats in the process)." Marjorie Baumgarten of The Austin Chronicle said it was "smart and funny" in September 1997, and labelled Downey Jr.'s performance as "absolutely captivating."

On an April 1998 episode of their program, Siskel and Ebert gave it two thumbs up. In his other review for the Chicago Sun-Times, Roger Ebert commented on Robert Downey Jr.'s performance: "Downey, whatever his problems, is a fine actor, smart and in command of his presence, and he's persuasive here as he defends himself: 'I'm an actor. And actors lie.' There is a show-stopping scene when he looks at himself in a mirror and warns himself to get his act together." Janet Maslin of The New York Times said: "When actors fall into tabloid hell, their careers too often are already on the skids. But Downey, who recently completed jail time for drug-related problems, proves again here that he is, professionally speaking, at the height of his powers. Two Girls and a Guy bursts into life as soon as this wildly inventive actor saunters into the story bellowing Vivaldi, and from that point on, it hangs on his every word. The two women here, especially the talented and ravishing Ms. Graham, aren't able to do anything of comparable interest."

A more negative review at the time came from Deseret News, who gave the film only half a star. They write, "featuring one of the worst film performances in recent history (from newcomer Natasha Gregson Wagner, daughter of the late Natalie Wood), this wildly over-the-top black comedy about two women who confront their 'shared' boyfriend doesn't score with any of the points it tries to make." Jack Mathews of the Los Angeles Times criticized the structure of the film, saying: "Two Girls and a Guy takes a lot of dubious side trips and ends with an event so unexpected it could have come from a different movie.

=== Legacy ===
In her 2014 book Robert Downey Jr. from Brat to Icon: Essays on the Film Career, Erin E. MacDonald said "the entire premise of the film could be read as a stand-in for drug intervention." She notes that Blake's behavior in the film "has an undeniable subtext of Downey's real life destruction and denial. To hear his pathetic attempts to cover his transgressions is to witness a man who knows all too well the feeling of being trapped. There's an uncomfortable degree of closeness to the actor's tabloid persona that Toback is clearly exploiting." When ranking the 59 films of Robert Downey Jr. in 2021, Kyle Wilson of Screen Rant placed Two Girls and a Guy 39th, calling it "a lively but indulgent roller-coaster ride that's saved by a seductively compelling performance by Downey."

In a 2023 interview with The New York Times, Downey Jr. reflected on the film, and a part in the bathroom scene in which he looks at himself in the mirror. He said, "I learned a lot from that one take. That was an end-of-the-day, we’ve got a mag of film left, here’s a dumb idea, and yet I learned as much from that as anything I had ever done up to that, with the exception of Chaplin."
