= The Big Bang (1989 film) =

- Directed by: James Toback
- Produced by: Joseph Kanter
- Starring: James Toback; Anne Marie Keyes; Barbara Traub; Tony Sirico; Fred Hess; Veronica Geng; Jack Richardson; Don Simpson; Elaine Kaufman; Darryl Dawkins
- Cinematography: Barry Markowitz
- Distributed by: Triton Pictures
- Release date: September 8, 1989 (TIFF)
- Country: United States
- Language: English

The Big Bang is a 1989 documentary film, directed by Academy Award-nominated screenwriter James Toback. The film addresses questions about life and existence. It was released to theaters on May 11, 1990, and aired on PBS on August 6, 1991.

== Synopsis ==
The film opens in a fine restaurant with Toback meeting with a Hollywood producer, pitching him the idea for a movie. He says there will be no script, no actors, and no story. It will be a movie “about the people who are in it…about creation and disintegration, God, life, love, sex, crime, madness, death, everything.” The restaurant scene "nods at My Dinner With Andre, the classic model of a raconteur's film.” Toback tells the producer that the idea was inspired by his epiphany that the origin of the cosmos was an “orgasmic explosion of God.” The producer expresses skepticism and reluctance to finance the project.

The film begins to introduce the interview subjects, about 20 individuals who are only identified by their professions—the Astronomer, the Medical Student, the Filmmaker, the Gangster, the Girl, the Humorist, the Writer, the Restauranteuse, the Survivor, and so on.

Their introductions are interspersed by the ongoing pitch between the director and the executive. The Astronomer discusses the creation of the universe with a singularity, the Big Bang, and the development of the stars and galaxies. Toback then asks each of the individuals how they believe the universe was created. Some have no idea. The Humorist believes there must have always been something, rejecting the ideas of nothingness and infinity. The Gangster says "I have no idea. You’d have to ask my brother the priest." The Girl says it began with "a piece of dust and then there was a squirrel. Then there was a dog. Then there was a cat...."

Toback continues with questions about love and sex. "The responses run the gamut from earnest to flippant, some are quite profound." Some answer more confidently than others. When Toback asks each of them if they believe in God, many say yes, but others aren’t so sure. The Writer provides the most unusual answer, saying, "I've seen him too many times to believe in him. The last time was in Baltimore, in a hotel. He was in the lobby, arguing about the size of his room."

"Toback, too, reveals himself in the process of asking his questions, poking fun, in his encounter with the Model (Sheila Kennedy), at his image as a lothario by lounging provocatively close to his attractive subject."

As the film continues, some of the interview subjects are identified. The Restauranteuse is Elaine Kaufman, the owner of Elaine's in New York City, the long-time famous dining spot for celebrities. The Filmmaker identifies himself as Don Simpson, producer of Flashdance, Beverly Hills Cop, and Top Gun.

Toback begins to ask more poignant questions as the film moves along, which prompts some of the subjects to become more pensive. They begin to reveal more of themselves as the questions continue, especially in response to questions about death, madness, and whether they would kill someone.

Some of the individuals stand out for their painfully honest and sometimes troubling answers. Among them is the Gangster. He tells of his violent history, how he "gave a lot of guys beatings," how he was shot on the steps of a church by rival gang members as a kid, the love and insane jealousy he experienced for a woman and for whom he left his wife and children. He discusses his time in prison and his distant relationship with family members. There is a bright spot for the gangster. He is grateful for the year he spent with his father as he was dying of a prolonged illness.

Toback asks if he would kill a complete stranger for a million dollars. The Gangster pauses for several seconds before answering that he would not. When the director presses and asks why not, the Gangster searches for an answer and replies, "I don't need the money." In an interesting glimpse into the future of art imitating life, we learn that the gangster is Gennaro Anthony Sirico, Jr. and goes by Tony Sirico. Ten years after the film, he would become famous for portraying Paulie Gualtieri in the HBO series The Sopranos.

The most poignant moments of the film are with the Survivor, a Jewish Hungarian woman who survived the death camps of World War II. She describes how as a young girl she and her mother were sent via train in a cattle car, packed with others, to Auschwitz where her sense of identity was erased. While at the camp, she and her mother were brought into a room with three other women. Dr. Josef Mengele entered the room. The Survivor describes him as evil incarnate, the Angel of Death. He separated the Survivor from her mother. When the Survivor asked a fellow woman prisoner where her mother is days later, the woman pointed to the black smoke of a chimney and said, "there she goes." The Survivor says, however, that her being a "mother and functioning to the best of her abilities means that Hitler didn't succeed."

Toback asks each of the subjects how the world will end and if they are concerned about it. The Gangster says, "it's the last thing on my mind" and that it doesn't frighten him at all. He's more afraid of being alone. The Astronomer tells us the end of life on Earth will be the result of the Sun running out of fuel. The writer says the world will end at the turn of the 21st century with his death.

The film ends where it began, in the restaurant with the director and producer continuing their discussion about financing it. The producer appears perplexed by the premise of such a movie and asks who will pay money to see it.

== Cinematography and sets ==
The cinematography changes with the interview subjects. For some individuals, such as the Philosopher, a formal office was used with a steady shot. For the Model, a plush sofa in a living room was used with sweeping crane movements of the camera. For the Gangster, a brightly lit room was used with the camera close in, showing only parts of his face. Wide shots were used for others or dim lighting for some, showing only one side of the subject's face.

== Music ==
The music changes to match the mood of the director's questions. With more exciting topics such as sex being discussed, a violin caprice by Niccolò Paganini is played. During the more somber moments, a slow piano prelude by Johann Sebastian Bach is performed.

== Reception ==
Despite its thought provoking questions, the film had mixed reviews. "What kind of people want to reveal their most profound thoughts and fears on screen?", asked Caryn James of the New York Times. "As it turns out, people who ultimately say very little, who are at best amusing, occasionally affecting and more often simply bland."

Owen Gleiberman of Entertainment Weekly wrote, "The startling thing about James Toback’s documentary The Big Bang is how much fun it is." He added, "it's a refreshing change of pace, both from Toback's other movies and from the lockstep commercialism of today's Hollywood. It deserves to be seen, and savored."

Roger Ebert gave it three of four stars. He wrote, "The Big Bang may be a sketch when a mural is called for, but it is a challenging sketch, the kind of movie that you want to see with a friend, and then sit down afterward for a good, long talk."

Rotten Tomatoes gives the film an 80% based on 5 reviews. IMDB reviewers give it a rating of 6 out of 10.
