= Jim (book) =

1971 book by James Toback

- Author: James Toback
- Language: English
- Genre: Biography
- Publisher: Doubleday
- Publication date: March 1, 1971
- Publication place: United States

Jim: The Author's Self-Centered Memoir of the Great Jim Brown is a 1971 biographical book written by James Toback.

== Overview ==
Biography about the life of football star and actor Jim Brown.

== Origins ==
Jim author James Toback's assignment from Esquire magazine to pen an article about football great and actor Jim Brown led to an invite from Brown for Toback to have extended stay in Brown's home in the Hollywood Hills.

Brown was quoted as saying about Toback, "Along with both of us liking girls, I just like his intellect."

According to the Cleveland Scene, Toback described Brown in the book thusly, "Jim Brown was without peer in affording insight into the injection of sexuality into every area of American life and learned tales of freaky scenes, brutality, and an ineluctable erotic flow."

== Critical reception ==
Kirkus Reviews said in its review "The personality of Brown observed at work (with the Black Economic Union) and at play (basketball with the author, golf with Bill Russell, sex with various and sundry ladies) never quite focuses through the clouds of charisma."

Salon.com wrote that the book was "an admittedly self-centered biography of football legend Jim Brown that chronicles Toback's experience as a Jewish white guy who lived with Brown in Hollywood, a life that was essentially a series of wild parties and orgies."

Calvin C. Hernton reviewed Jim for The New York Times and said, "James Toback reveals as much about himself in this book as he does about his subject, Jim Brown," adding, ""Jim" is an interpersonal, intimate and complex book."

Conversely, Vincent Canby of The New York Times wrote ""Jim" is an appalling and fascinating mixture of self‐analysis, hero‐worship and incredible self‐importance."
