= Gene Rutherford =

American film and television actor

- Born: Robert Eugene Rutherford Jr. March 4, 1939; DeSoto County, Mississippi, U.S.
- Died: September 24, 2006 (aged 67); Memphis, Tennessee, U.S.
- Occupations: Film and television actor

Robert Eugene Rutherford Jr. (March 4, 1939 – September 24, 2006) was an American film and television actor. He was best known for playing the recurring role of Bart Kellogg, the mountain man, in the first and second season of the American western television series The High Chaparral.

== Life and career ==
Rutherford was born in DeSoto County, Mississippi. He began his screen career in 1967, appearing in the CBS sitcom television series The Andy Griffith Show. In the same year, he played Rufus Quint, the psychotic son of Preacher Quint (Donald Pleasence), in Tom Gries's film Will Penny.

Later in his career, Rutherford guest-starred in television programs including Gunsmoke, Bonanza, The Big Valley, Trapper John, M.D., The Monkees, Mannix and Here Come the Brides, and played the recurring role of Bart Kellogg, the mountain man, in the first and second season of the NBC western television series The High Chaparral. He also appeared in films such as Love and Money, The Witch Who Came from the Sea, Fyre and The Candy Tangerine Man.

Rutherford retired from acting in 1983, last appearing in the ABC action adventure television series The Fall Guy.

== Death ==
Rutherford died on September 24, 2006, in Memphis, Tennessee, at the age of 67.
