= An Imperfect Murder =

2017 film

- Film poster
- Directed by: James Toback
- Written by: James Toback
- Produced by: Alan Helene; Michael Mailer; Martin Tuchman; Valda Witt; Jennifer Gelfer
- Starring: Sienna Miller; Alec Baldwin; Charles Grodin; Colleen Camp
- Cinematography: Larry McConkey
- Edited by: Aaron Yanes
- Music by: Jeanne Fox
- Production company: Michael Mailer Films
- Distributed by: Quiver Distribution
- Release dates: September 3, 2017 (Venice); October 9, 2020 (United States)
- Running time: 71 minutes
- Country: United States
- Language: English

An Imperfect Murder (also known as The Private Life of a Modern Woman) is a 2017 American drama film written and directed by James Toback. It was screened out of competition at the 74th Venice International Film Festival.

The film was released in limited theaters and on VOD in the United States on October 9, 2020 by Quiver Distribution.

It was the final film to star Charles Grodin, who died on May 18, 2021.

== Cast ==
- Sienna Miller as Vera Lockman
- Alec Baldwin as Detective McCutcheon
- Charles Grodin as Arthur
- Colleen Camp as Elaine Lockman
- John Buffalo Mailer as Leon
- Oliver "Power" Grant as Rameesh
- Carl Icahn as Himself
- James Toback as Franklin

== Reception ==
On the review aggregator website Rotten Tomatoes, 40% of five critics' reviews are positive, with an average rating of 3.00/10.

In his review for Variety, Owen Gleiberman described the film as "a thrift-shop psychological X-ray that demands to be taken on its own Tobackian terms. But even on those terms, it spends too much time telling us things that it should be showing us. For a movie that’s out to explore the consciousness of a “modern woman,” it contains more mansplaining than an hour of “Fox & Friends.”"
