= Shadow Hours =

- US DVD cover.
- Directed by: Isaac H. Eaton
- Written by: Isaac H. Eaton
- Produced by: Isaac H. Eaton
- Starring: Balthazar Getty; Peter Weller; Rebecca Gayheart
- Cinematography: Frank Byers
- Music by: Brian Tyler
- Production companies: 5150 Productions; Newmark Films Inc. Seven Arts Productions
- Distributed by: Newmark Films Inc. (USA)
- Release date: July 17, 2000 (Limited)
- Running time: 95 min.
- Country: United States
- Language: English
- Box office: $38,181

Shadow Hours is a 2000 American thriller directed, written and produced by Isaac H. Eaton. It premiered in competition during the 2000 Sundance Film Festival.

== Plot ==
Michael Holloway is a recovering addict working as a gas station attendant to support his pregnant wife, Chloe. He is then drawn into the seedy underworld of Los Angeles by Stuart, a mysterious and wealthy stranger.

== Cast ==
- Balthazar Getty as Michael Holloway
- Peter Weller as Stuart Chappell
- Rebecca Gayheart as Chloe Holloway
- Peter Greene as Detective Steve Andrianson
- Frederic Forrest as Sean
- Brad Dourif as Roland Montague
- Michael Dorn as Detective Thomas Greenwood

== Reception ==
Shadow Hours received mixed to negative reviews. The film holds a 14% approval rating on the review aggregator website, Rotten Tomatoes, with an average rating of 2.7/10 based on an aggregation of 14 reviews. Metacritic, which uses a weighted mean, assigned a score of 26 out of 100, based on reviews from 13 film critics. Lawrence Van Gelder of The New York Times wrote that "Rarely has debauchery been such a bore", whereas Maitland McDonagh of TV Guide had a less harsh opinion, calling the movie "a very entertaining, if thoroughly silly, morality tale" and giving it four out of five stars.
