= Santa's Slay =

- Theatrical release poster
- Directed by: David Steiman
- Written by: David Steiman
- Produced by: Sammy Lee; Brett Ratner; Doug Steeden
- Starring: Bill Goldberg; Douglas Smith; Emilie de Ravin; Robert Culp; Saul Rubinek; Dave Thomas; Rebecca Gayheart; Chris Kattan; Fran Drescher
- Cinematography: Matthew F. Leonetti
- Edited by: Steven Polivka; Julia Wong
- Music by: Henning Lohner
- Production company: VIP Medienfonds 1
- Distributed by: Media 8 Entertainment
- Release date: December 20, 2005
- Running time: 78 minutes
- Countries: Canada; United States
- Language: English

Santa's Slay is a 2005 Canadian American Christmas black comedy slasher film written and directed by David Steiman, a former assistant to Brett Ratner; Ratner served as a producer. After a millennium of spreading Christmas joy due to losing a bet with an angel, Santa Claus reverts to his demonic self and gives the gift of evil and fear. The film stars Bill Goldberg, Douglas Smith, Emilie de Ravin, Robert Culp, Saul Rubinek, Dave Thomas, Rebecca Gayheart, Chris Kattan, and Fran Drescher.

Santa's Slay was released in the United States on December 20, 2005, by Media 8 Entertainment. The film received mixed reviews from critics.

== Plot ==
On Christmas Eve in Alberta, Canada, the Mason family is bickering about their wealth and material possessions while eating Christmas dinner when Santa Claus comes down the chimney and kills them all in various graphic displays of Christmas-themed violence, such as drowning the matriarch Virginia in eggnog, using the star atop a Christmas tree as a shuriken, and stabbing the patriarch's hands to the table with cutlery and force-feeding him a leg of turkey before impaling his mouth on it.

Riding on his sleigh driven by his "hell-deer", a buffalo-like beast, Santa arrives at Hell Township and decimates the locals in various holiday-themed ways. In one of his kills, Santa slaughters the occupants of a local strip club. Pastor Timmons, a crooked minister, manages to survive the massacre. Later, Santa murders the local Jewish delicatessen owner Mr. Green using his own menorah.

Meanwhile, teenager Nicholas Yuleson is living with his grandfather, a crackpot inventor who has built a bunker in their basement to survive Christmas. When Nicholas asks Grandpa why he hates Christmas, he is shown "The Book of Klaus", which reveals the origins of Santa Claus. Apparently, Santa was the result of a virgin birth produced by Satan. Christmas was "The Day of Slaying" for Santa until A.D. 1005, when an angel defeated him in a curling match and sentenced him to deliver presents on Christmas as punishment for 1,000 years. This means that Santa is free to kill again in 2005.

Upon arriving at the delicatessen, Nicholas is taken to the police station for questioning about Mr. Green's murder. He is bailed out by his love interest, Mary "Mac" Mackenzie, just before Santa arrives and kills all of the officers. Santa pursues Nicholas and Mac in a police car, but they are able to escape, thanks to a shotgun in Mac's truck. They flee to his grandpa’s bunker, with Santa still in pursuit. Nicholas and Mac manage to escape using Grandpa's snowmobile; Grandpa Yuleson is apparently killed.

The two teens hide in a local high school, hoping that Santa's powers will end once Christmas ends; but they are eventually forced to confront him in the gym. They are almost killed by Santa on a Zamboni but are saved by Grandpa, who is actually the angel who originally defeated and sentenced Santa. With Christmas over and his powers gone, Santa flees; but his "hell-deer" is shot down by Mac's father with a bazooka. Pastor Timmons is found dead in a Santa suit and is presumed to be the killer, while, in fact, the real killer Santa Claus is boarding a flight from Winnipeg to the North Pole under the name "Mr. Šatan." Nicholas notes to Mac that Santa is bound to come back, stating he's finishing what his grandfather started. He and Mac then share a kiss to pursue a relationship.

After the credits, Santa is seen looking over his Naughty List, when he looks into the camera and says "Who's Next?"

== Cast ==
- Douglas Smith as Nicholas Yuleson
- Bill Goldberg as Santa Claus / Mr. Shatan
- Emilie de Ravin as Mary "Mac" Mackenzie
- Robert Culp as Grandpa Yuleson
- Dave Thomas as Pastor Timmons
- Saul Rubinek as Mr. Green
- James Caan as Darren Mason (uncredited)
- Rebecca Gayheart as Gwen Mason
- Chris Kattan as Jason Mason
- Fran Drescher as Virginia Mason
- Alicia Loren as Beth Mason
- Annie Sorell as Taylor Mason
- Donna Zuk as Mrs. Talbot
- Jeff Hanna as Sean Mackenzie
- Paul Punyi as James Mackenzie
- Tom 'Tiny' Lister as Gas Station Attendant
- Scott Francis Gibson as The SWNDSU Place Kicker
- Jimmy Herman as Vinny
- Michael David Simms as Captain Caulk
- Rick Ash as Officer Dick Zucker
- Donald Bland as The Bouncer
- Christian Fraser as The Bartender
- Ron Webber as Bar Patron
- King Lau as Security Guard
- Dwayne Wiley as Valet
- David Cormican as Valet
- Kevin Gillese as Disgruntled youth
- Ronnie as Santa's Helldeer
- Apache as Santa's Helldeer
- Joan Dunham as Random Grandmother
- Kendall Garwryluk as Random Father
- Magdalena Maslik as Random Mother
- David Assaly as Twin Boys #1
- Dylan Demas as Twin Boys #2

== Release ==
Santa's Slay was released on DVD in the United States by Lionsgate on December 20, 2005. It was released in Canada that same day by Maple Pictures. Lionsgate later re-released the film on November 10, 2008.

== Reception ==
Randall Colburn from The A.V. Club gave the film a positive review, calling it "simultaneously vulgar and wholesome, stupid and satirical, violent and lighthearted". Todd Martin of HorrorNews.net also liked the film, writing, "It isn't perfect and there are times when it is a little too corny for its own good but overall it is just a fun, brainless movie that has a ton of violence in it." Brett Gallman from Oh, the Horror wrote, "Admittedly, the film doesn't quite keep up the relentless pace the entire time, but it's mostly one hell of a slay ride, full of cheesy dialogue, colorful characters, and plenty of laughs." David Nusair from ReelFilm Reviews gave the film a mixed 2.5 out of 5 stars, commending the film's humor, pacing, and Goldberg's tongue-in-cheek performance while also stating that the film ran out of steam in the third act.

The film was not without its detractors. Jon Condit from Dread Central was highly critical of the film, awarding it 1.5 out of 5 stars. In his review, Condit criticized the film's writing and direction as being "sloppy" and "amateurish", also criticizing the abrupt ending.
