= Will Penny =

1968 film by Tom Gries

- Theatrical poster
- Directed by: Tom Gries
- Written by: Tom Gries
- Produced by: Fred Engel; Walter Seltzer
- Starring: Charlton Heston; Joan Hackett; Donald Pleasence; Ben Johnson; Bruce Dern; Slim Pickens; Lee Majors
- Cinematography: Lucien Ballard
- Edited by: Warren Low
- Music by: David Raksin
- Color process: Technicolor
- Production company: Paramount Pictures
- Distributed by: Paramount Pictures
- Release dates: February 16, 1968 (Finland); April 10, 1968 (U.S.)
- Running time: 110 minutes
- Country: United States
- Language: English
- Budget: $1,400,000
- Box office: $1,800,000 (US/ Canada)

Will Penny is a 1968 American Western film written and directed by Tom Gries and starring Charlton Heston, Joan Hackett and Donald Pleasence. The picture was based upon an episode of the 1960 Sam Peckinpah television series The Westerner starring Brian Keith called "Line Camp," also written and directed by Tom Gries. Heston mentioned that this was his favorite film in which he appeared. The supporting cast features Lee Majors, Ben Johnson, Bruce Dern, and Slim Pickens.

== Plot ==
A trail drive is coming to an end, with the resulting payoff of the now out-of-work trail hands. A trio of punchers, Blue, Dutchy, and an aging Will Penny decide to drift south and avoid the oncoming winter. Will trades his position riding on the train with the cattle to a young cowboy who wants to visit his dying father and tells Will there may be work at the Flat Iron ranch.

One morning Blue is about to fire at a bull elk near a river bottom. Mysteriously, the elk is shot by an unseen party. As Blue and Dutchy move in to claim the elk anyway, they encounter the shooter, a "rawhider" and his family. The two groups contest the right to the meat. Gunfire erupts, and Will shows up, shoots and kills one of the rawhider's sons. The rawhider swears a biblical revenge. Dutchy accidentally wounds himself in the exchange, so the trio head out to find a doctor and first come to a nearby trail store, where they encounter Catherine Allen and her son Horace. After getting a few drinks of whiskey they move on to the nearest town and leave Dutchy at the doctor. Blue decides to look for a job in the town, while Will proceeds alone. He comes across a horse without a rider and locates a dead cowboy, thrown from his saddle. Will turns the body over to the Flat Iron ranch that the cowboy rode for and is offered a job.

Will hires on to ride the far-off boundaries of Flat Iron ranch over the winter. As he arrives at the upper range, he finds Catherine and Horace staying in the line-rider's cabin after being abandoned by their guide. He rides away to inspect the fence line, warning them that they must be gone when he returns in one week.

The next morning as Will is sleeping outside near the fence, he is ambushed and savagely beaten up and knifed by the rawhider group. They rob and leave Will for dead, but he drags himself to the cabin, where he is slowly nursed back to health by Catherine.

As the winter passes, Will and Catherine fall in love, and Will develops fatherly affection for Horace.

As Will and Catherine prepare for Christmas, the Quint family bursts into the cabin, force Will into doing the chores, and coerce Catherine to decide on one of the ne'er do well, belligerent, hair-trigger sons. After some days, Catherine distracts the two Quint sons so Will can make an escape. At that same time his two former saddle pals Blue and Dutchy arrive looking for him. Will and Blue return to attack the cabin to free Catherine and Horace, using a bag of sulfur in the chimney to smoke out the rawhiders and then shoot them all.

With the rawhiders dead the Flat Iron trail boss arrives, Will realizes that he is too old and set in his ways to settle down into a domestic life with Catherine, against her protestations. Deeply regretful about what he is leaving behind, he rides away with Dutchy and Blue to collect on a bet with the store owner on Dutchy's survival and continue his life as a trail hand. He donated his wages from the ranch to Catherine.

== Cast ==
- Charlton Heston as Will Penny
- Joan Hackett as Catherine Allen
- Jon Gries as Horace Greeley "Button" Allen
- Donald Pleasence as Preacher Quint
- Lee Majors as Blue
- Bruce Dern as Rafe Quint
- Ben Johnson as Alex (Flat Iron Ranch foreman)
- Slim Pickens as Ike Walterstein
- Clifton James as Catron
- Anthony Zerbe as Dutchy
- Roy Jenson as Boetius Sullivan
- G. D. Spradlin as Anse Howard
- Quentin Dean as Jennie
- William Schallert as Dr. Fraker
- Lydia Clarke as Mrs. Fraker
- Robert Luster as Shem Bodine
- Dal Jenkins as Sambo
- Matt Clark as Romulus
- Luke Askew as Foxy
- Anthony Costello as Bigfoot
- Gene Rutherford as Rufus Quint
- Chanin Hale as Girl
- Stephen Edwards as Town Boy

== Production ==
The film features a David Raksin and Robert Wells song "The Lonely Rider" with vocals by Don Cherry. The exteriors were filmed in Inyo County, California.

== Reviews ==
"The admirable thing about the movie is its devotion to real life. These are the kind of people, we feel, who must really have inhabited the West: common, direct, painfully shy in social situations and very honest." — Roger Ebert, Chicago Sun-Times

"And I got to really like the guy. A lot of people told me that I wouldn't like him, but I liked him. And he tried very hard. I mean, Will Penny is far and away the best thing he's ever done." — Bruce Dern on Charlton Heston

"Intelligent and thoughtful, Will Penny is a good Western and even a better character study. The West is more than deglamorized here; we get a good approximation of what a real cowboy's life might have been like around the turn of the century." — DVD Savant, DVDTalk

"The villains in Will Penny are so unbelievable and so unrealistic that they almost seem like they came out of a Western spoof, rather than the serious, realistic Western which Will Penny aspires to be (and achieves in most other aspects of the story)." — Erik Rupp, Vista Records

"This is one of the classic movies of all time. It will last for all eternity as a classic in writing and in acting." — Ange Kenos, OPA Magazine

"Charlton Heston told me this was the film he is most proud of and was his favorite screen role." — Rick Schmidlin, producer of the re-edited version of "Touch of Evil."

== Accolades ==
The film is recognized by American Film Institute in these lists:

- 2008: AFI's 10 Top 10:
  - Nominated Western Film

== See also ==
- List of American films of 1968
