= Rebecca Gayheart =

American actress (born 1971)

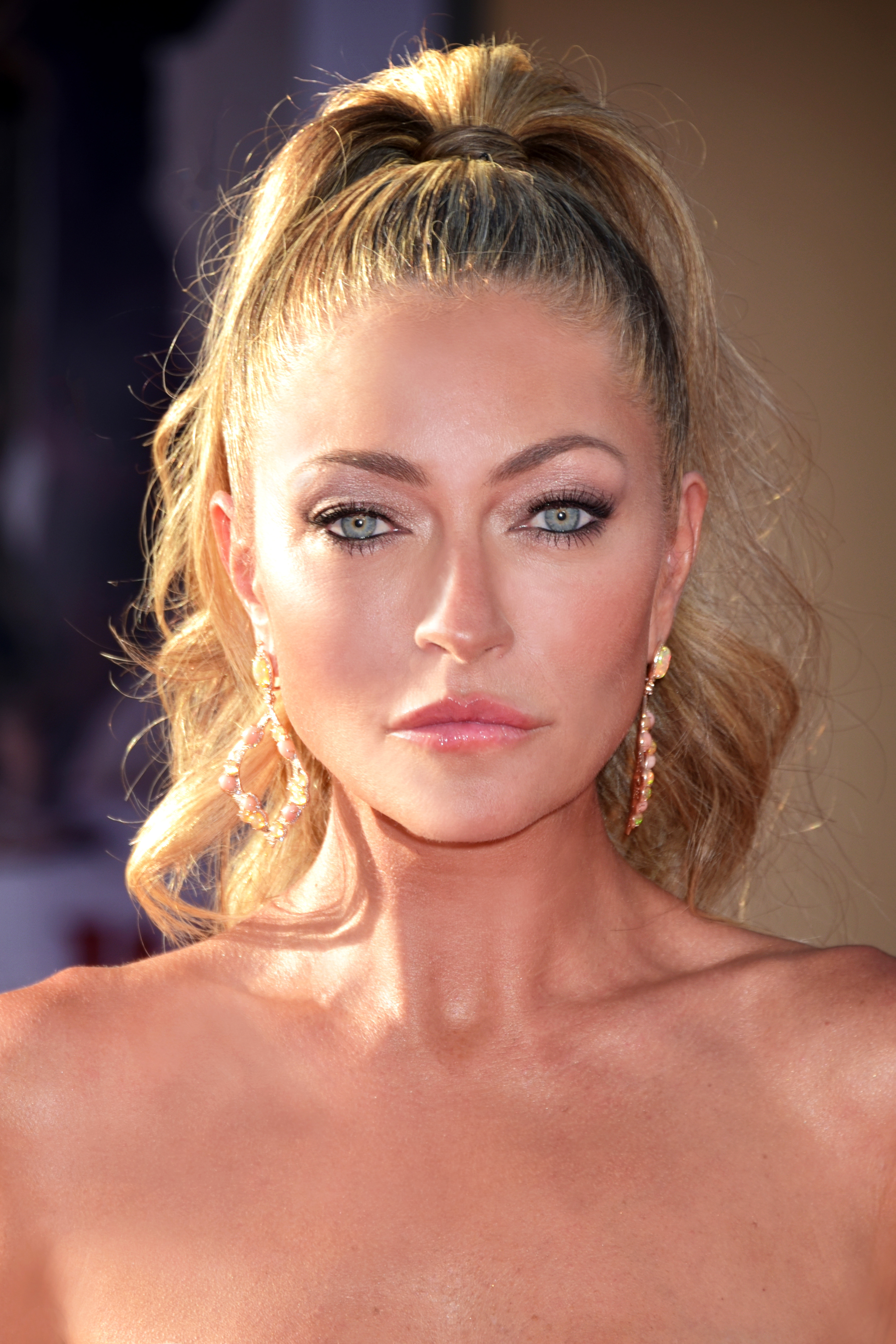
- Gayheart in 2019
- Born: August 12, 1971 (age 55); Hazard, Kentucky, U.S.
- Education: Lee Strasberg Theatre and Film Institute
- Occupations: Actress; model
- Years active: 1990–present
- Known for: Urban Legend; Scream 2; Nothing to Lose; Jawbreaker; Once Upon a Time in Hollywood
- Spouse: Eric Dane (m. 2004; died 2026)
- Children: 2

Rebecca Gayheart (born August 12, 1971) is an American actress and model. Gayheart began her career as a teen model in the 1980s before becoming an advertising spokeswoman. She has been active as an actress since 1990.

== Early life ==
Gayheart was born on August 12, 1971, in Hazard, Kentucky, the third of four children born to Floneva "Flo" Gayheart (née Slone), who worked as a Mary Kay independent beauty consultant, and Curtis Gayheart, a miner and coal-truck driver. She has two sisters and a brother. She is of German, English, Scottish and Scots-Irish descent. Gayheart spent her early life in Pine Top, Kentucky, and has said she "grew up dirt poor".

In her first year of high school, Gayheart portrayed Lizzie Borden in a stage play. At age 15, she won a local modeling contest, after which she moved to New York City. There, she completed her high school education at the Professional Children's School and attended the actors' conservatory of the Lee Strasberg Theatre and Film Institute. Meanwhile, she earned a living appearing in commercials for Campbell's soup, Noxzema, and Burger King, and modeling for J. C. Penney catalogues.

== Career ==
In her first film role, Gayheart appeared in Brett Ratner's New York University short film Whatever Happened to Mason Reese? (1990). She also appeared in the Ratner-directed video for Heavy D and the Boyz's song "Nuttin' But Love".

In the early 1990s, Gayheart broke into the television industry with a series of TV commercials for Noxzema, earning her the moniker "The Noxzema Girl". The ads began airing in 1991 and brought her national recognition. In 1992, Gayheart was cast in her first major role, as Hannah Mayberry on the soap opera Loving. In 1993 and 1994, she had a recurring role in the Vanishing Son action series as cellist Clair Rutledge, the love interest of Russell Wong's character Jian-Wa Chang. In 1994 and 1995, Gayheart played Bess Martin in the science-fiction series Earth 2. In 1995, she played Antonia Marchette, a recurring character in the series Beverly Hills, 90210, and Luke Perry's character's love interest; the character was killed off after a 10-episode storyline. Her feature film debut came in the comedy Nothing to Lose (1997) opposite Tim Robbins and Martin Lawrence, as a flower shop employee who woos an advertising executive. The same year, she had a minor role as a sorority sister in Wes Craven's horror film Scream 2.

After completing Scream 2, Gayheart was cast in a lead role in the slasher film Urban Legend (1998), playing the best friend of a college student (Alicia Witt) who suspects their friends are being murdered according to urban legends. The same year, she appeared onstage at Toronto's Canon Theatre in a production of The Last Night of Ballyhoo opposite Rhea Perlman and Perrey Reeves. In 1999, Gayheart starred in the black comedy film Jawbreaker with Rose McGowan, Julie Benz, and Judy Greer as girls in an exclusive clique in their high school who inadvertently kill their friend. The film was a box-office failure but later gained a cult following.

Gayheart starred in the video for Train's 1999 song "Meet Virginia".

In 2000, Gayheart had a lead role in the vampire film From Dusk Till Dawn 3: The Hangman's Daughter and a lead role in the thriller Shadow Hours, opposite Balthazar Getty. She also had a cameo appearance in Urban Legends: Final Cut, the sequel to Urban Legend. She followed this with an appearance in the independent comedy Harvard Man (2001).

In 2002, Gayheart was cast as Inara Serra on the TV series Firefly but left shortly after production began. The role was given to Morena Baccarin and none of Gayheart's work was used. Gayheart had recurring guest roles in the TV series Dead Like Me (2003), Nip/Tuck (2004–2006), and Vanished (2006).

From March to July 2005, Gayheart starred in a Broadway production of Steel Magnolias. David Rooney of Variety praised her performance, writing: "Exuding all the breezy confidence of a girl who's always been popular and pretty, Gayheart's Shelby provides a strong center, allowing only brief glimpses of the cracks in her cheerful, optimistic veneer and refusing to be treated as fragile goods by the clucking women around her." She also appeared in a minor role in the Christmas horror-comedy film Santa's Slay (2005). In 2007, Gayheart guest-starred on Ugly Betty as Jordan, an ex-girlfriend of Alexis Meade. In 2008, she returned to Broadway in a revival of the comedy Boeing-Boeing opposite Christine Baranski, Mark Rylance, Greg Germann, Paige Davis, and Missi Pyle. She had a guest role on The Cleaner in 2009.

Gayheart returned to film in 2013, reuniting with Jawbreaker director Darren Stein for his comedy G.B.F., portraying the mother of a gay teenage boy. She also starred opposite her husband, Eric Dane, in the thriller film Grey Lady, which was shot in 2014 and released in 2017.

In 2019, Gayheart returned to film with a minor supporting role in Quentin Tarantino's Once Upon a Time in Hollywood, playing Billie Booth, the ill-fated wife of Brad Pitt's character.

== Personal life ==
Gayheart had a 13-year relationship with director Brett Ratner beginning when he was 17 and she was 15. She and Ratner were engaged in 1997, but separated in 1999. Gayheart married actor Eric Dane on October 29, 2004, in Las Vegas. Dane told Flaunt magazine how they met: "It's probably one of the least interesting stories in the world. It went basically like this: 'You wanna go out?' 'Yeah, sure.' Ten months later, we were married."

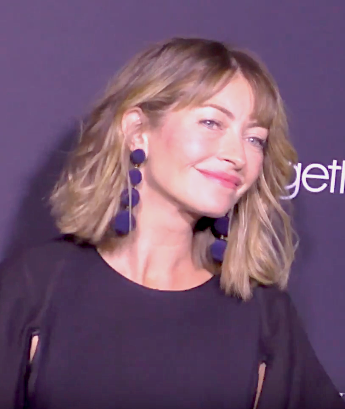
Gayheart in 2014

On March 3, 2010, Gayheart gave birth to her first daughter. On December 28, 2011, she gave birth to her second daughter.

In February 2018, Gayheart filed for divorce from Dane after 14 years of marriage, citing "irreconcilable differences". On March 7, 2025, she filed to withdraw her divorce petition. In November 2025, Gayheart spoke publicly about how she and their daughters were supporting Dane amid his amyotrophic lateral sclerosis (ALS) diagnosis, noting that although she and Dane had been separated for years, he remained engaged in their family's life. Dane died in February 2026.

== Legal issues ==
On June 13, 2001, while driving a vehicle owned by Australian actor Marco Leonardi, Gayheart struck nine-year-old Jorge Cruz Jr. as he walked across a Los Angeles street. Cruz died of his injuries the next day. Gayheart paid the family $10,000 for funeral expenses. On August 7, 2001, she made her only public statement on the incident: "The pain of this tragedy will live with me forever. Despite the allegations in the lawsuit, the facts will establish that this was a most unfortunate accident."

On November 27, 2001, Gayheart pleaded no contest to vehicular manslaughter. She was sentenced to three years of probation, a one-year suspension of her license, a $2,800 fine (equivalent to $5,100 in 2025), and 750 hours of community service. Cruz's parents filed a wrongful death lawsuit that was settled out of court.

== Filmography ==
=== Film ===
Year	Film	Role	Notes
1990	Whatever Happened to Mason Reese?	Model #1	Short film
1996	Somebody Is Waiting	Lilli	
1997	Nothing to Lose	Danielle	
1997	Scream 2	Sorority Sister Lois	
1998	Hairshirt	Jennifer Scott	
1998	Urban Legend	Brenda Bates	
1999	Puppet	Lori Myers	
1999	Jawbreaker	Julie Freeman	
2000	From Dusk Till Dawn 3: The Hangman's Daughter	Mary Newlie	
2000	Shadow Hours	Chloe Holloway	
2000	Urban Legends: Final Cut	Brenda Bates	Uncredited cameo
2001	Doppelganger	Brian's Girlfriend	Short film
2001	Harvard Man	Kelly Morgan	
2002	Pipe Dream	Marliss Funt	
2005	Santa's Slay	Gwen Mason	
2007	Bunny Whipped	Beatriz Magdalene Johnson	
2013	G.B.F.	Mrs. Daniels	
2015	Grey Lady	Maggie Wynn	
2019	Once Upon a Time in Hollywood	Billie Booth	

=== Television ===
Year	Film	Role	Notes
1992–1993	Loving	Hannah Mayberry	Main Role: March 2, 1992 – June 30, 1993
1992	All My Children	Hannah Mayberry	Recurring/Guest role: October 6–9, 1992
1994	Vanishing Son	Clair Armstrong	Television film
1994	Vanishing Son III	Clair Armstrong	Television film
1994	Vanishing Son IV	Clair Armstrong	Television film
1994–1995	Earth 2	Bess Martin	21 episodes
1995	Beverly Hills, 90210	Antonia "Toni" Marchette	8 episodes
1996	Sliders	Natalie	1 episode
1997	Invasion	Cassy Winslow	Television film
1998	Hercules	Medea (voice)	1 episode
1999	Wasteland	Samantha "Sam" Price	13 episodes
1999	Mad TV	Herself	1 episode
2001	Inside Schwartz	Nadia	1 episode
2003	Dead Like Me	Betty Rhomer	5 episodes
2003	What I Like About You	Dana	1 episode
2004	The Division	Suzanne Richland	3 episodes
2004–2006	Nip/Tuck	Natasha Charles	3 episodes
2005	The Christmas Blessing	Meghan	Television film
2006	Scarlett	Scarlett	Television film
2006	Medium	Jessica Delaney	1 episode
2006	Vanished	Judy Nash	13 episodes
2007	CSI: Miami	Claire Gibbs	1 episode
2007	Ugly Betty	Jordan Dunn	1 episode
2009	The Cleaner	Carey Kern	1 episode

== Stage credits ==
Year	Film	Role	Notes	Ref.
1998	The Last Night of Ballyhoo	Sunny	Canon Theatre	
2005	Steel Magnolias	Shelby Eatenton-Latcherie	Lyceum Theatre	
2008	Boeing-Boeing	Gabrielle	Longacre Theatre	
