= Love and Money (film) =

1982 film by James Toback

- DVD cover
- Directed by: James Toback
- Written by: James Toback
- Produced by: Richard McWhorter; James Toback
- Starring: Ray Sharkey
- Cinematography: Fred Schuler
- Edited by: Dennis M. Hill
- Production company: Lorimar
- Distributed by: Paramount Pictures
- Release date: February 12, 1982
- Running time: 90 minutes
- Country: United States
- Language: English
- Box office: $14,009

Love and Money, also known as Love & Money, is a 1982 American drama film directed by James Toback and starring Ray Sharkey.

== Plot ==
Byron Levin works in a California bank. He becomes infatuated with Catherine Stockheinz, the wife of his billionaire boss. Frederic Stockheinz has a million-dollar offer to make. He asks Byron to go to the republic of Costa Salva to offer a business proposition to the dictator there, Lorenzo Prado, who just happens to be Byron's old college roommate. Matters become further complicated when Catherine and Byron begin an affair.

== Cast ==
- Ray Sharkey as Byron Levin
- Ornella Muti as Catherine Stockheinz
- Klaus Kinski as Frederic Stockheinz
- Armand Assante as Lorenzo Prado
- King Vidor as Walter Klein
- William Prince as Paultz
- Tony Sirico as Raoul (as Anthony Sirico)
- Jacqueline Brookes as Mrs. Paultz
- Rodolfo Hoyos Jr. as Gen. Sanzer
- Tom McFadden as Blair
- Tony Plana as National Guard General
- Gene Rutherford as Hotel Waiter

== Production ==
Toback wrote the script "on spec". He attached Frank Yablans who unsuccessfully tried to set up the film at 20th Century Fox. It was then bought by Columbia Studios, who put it in development. The management of the studio changed and the project was put into "turnaround". Warren Beatty bought the script on the strength of Toback's debut feature as director, Fingers. He set it up at Paramount, intending to star and produce.

At Paramount, Beatty got the film critic Pauline Kael to work on the project. Kael was an admirer of Toback's and Beatty's and had recently left film criticism to work in Hollywood. However, Kael dropped out of the project after a number of weeks, instead becoming a consultant for Paramount (she would eventually return to film criticism).

"She helped me immensely on the script," said Toback of Kael. "But she decided she didn't want to ossify herself on one project for a year... Saying Pauline did a masterful job of alienating everyone is totally crazy. There has never been any kind of blow up, hostility, or disagreement except the kinds of disagreements that two intelligent people have over creative ideas. She had some ideas for Love or Money that I wasn't willing to go along with, but her contributions were large."

Beatty dropped out of the film to concentrate on Reds. Toback and Paramount could not agree on casting without Beatty's involvement. The project was put into turnaround again, and Toback set up the film at Lorimar. Filming started November 26, 1979.

Toback made the film with Ray Sharkey, whom he later called "the wrong actor".

The role of Sharkey's grandfather was originally meant to be played by Harry Ritz. He fell ill after one day of filming and had to be replaced. Toback offered the role to director King Vidor. His part took five days to film.
