= Harvard Man =

2001 film by James Toback

- Theatrical release poster
- Directed by: James Toback
- Written by: James Toback
- Produced by: Daniel Bigel; Michael Mailer
- Starring: Adrian Grenier; Sarah Michelle Gellar; Joey Lauren Adams; Rebecca Gayheart; Ray Allen; Eric Stoltz
- Cinematography: David Ferrara
- Edited by: Suzy Elmiger
- Music by: Ryan Shore
- Production companies: Bigel/Mailer Films; The Kushner-Locke Company
- Distributed by: Lions Gate Films; Multicom Entertainment Group
- Release dates: May 10, 2001 (Cannes); April 12, 2002 (United States)
- Running time: 94 minutes
- Country: United States
- Language: English
- Budget: $5.5 million
- Box office: $56,653

Harvard Man is a 2001 American crime comedy-drama thriller film written and directed by James Toback, and starring Adrian Grenier, Sarah Michelle Gellar, Joey Lauren Adams, Rebecca Gayheart, Ray Allen, and Eric Stoltz.

== Plot ==
When his parents' house is destroyed in a tornado, Harvard student Alan Jensen, point guard for the Harvard men's basketball team, is desperate for $100,000 to replace their home. He is approached by his girlfriend Cindy Bandolini, whose father is an organized crime boss. Cindy convinces Alan to throw a game for the money. She tells Alan that her father is behind the deal, but actually she goes to her father's associate, Teddy Carter, and Carter's assistant, Kelly Morgan for funding. What she does not know is that Carter and Morgan are undercover FBI agents.

Alan throws the game, gives his parents the money, and then undergoes a psychedelic experience after he ingests a 15,000 microgram dose of LSD, followed by a long stretch of the film during which morphing special effects demonstrate Alan's altered state as he is pursued by Carter, while Cindy is collared by Morgan.

Just when it looks like a toss-up as to what will prove his downfall first, the bad trip, the FBI, or the mob, Alan's other girlfriend, who is also his philosophy lecturer, Chesney Cort, saves the day. Not only does she get Alan to a doctor who can bring him back to sobriety, she reveals that she is in a sexual threesome with Carter and Morgan. Once he gets some photographic evidence for blackmail, Alan is extricated from his problems.

The ending implies that he may have hallucinogen persisting perception disorder, a chronic disorder in which a person has flashbacks of visual hallucinations, known as flashbacks, during a previous hallucinogenic drug experience. While taking a picture of a boy in the park, the boy's face morphs and Alan hears echoes of past conversations as Sandy says, "Sometimes it never ends". The little boy consoles Alan, telling him, "everything's okay". He responds, "I hope you're right". A close up is shown of his eyes dilated.

== Cast ==
- Sarah Michelle Gellar as Cindy Bandolini
- Adrian Grenier as Alan Jensen
- Joey Lauren Adams as Chesney Cort
- Eric Stoltz as Teddy Carter
- Rebecca Gayheart as Kelly Morgan
- Gianni Russo as Andrew Bandolini
- Ray Allen as Marcus Blake
- Michael Aparo as Russell
- Scottie Epstein as Mario
- John Neville as Dr. Reese
- Polly Shannon as Juliet
- Phillip Jarrett as Coach Preston
- Chantal Cousineau as Sandy
- Al Franken as himself
- Ivan Kajfes as himself

== Music ==
The film's original score was composed by Ryan Shore.

== Release ==
Harvard Man had only a limited theatrical release in July 2002, and received little critical or popular acclaim, although it achieved some success when it was released on video and DVD in October of that year.

== Critical reception ==
The film received mixed reviews from critics. On Rotten Tomatoes, the film has a rating of 33%, based on 36 reviews, with an average rating of 4.6/10. The site's critical consensus reads, "Harvard Man is a pretentious, incoherent mess." On Metacritic, which uses an average of critics' reviews, the film has a score of 49 out of 100, based on 20 reviews, indicating "mixed or average" reviews.
