= Fugly! =

2014 film by Alfredo De Villa

- Theatrical release poster
- Directed by: Alfredo De Villa
- Written by: Kathy DeMarco; John Leguizamo
- Produced by: Daniel Bigel; Laura Knight; John Leguizamo
- Starring: John Leguizamo; Radha Mitchell; Rosie Perez; Griffin Dunne; Yul Vazquez; Ally Sheedy
- Cinematography: Nancy Schreiber
- Edited by: John Coniglio; Jaime Valdueza
- Music by: Michael A. Levine
- Production companies: Rebel Films; Bigel Entertainment
- Distributed by: 108 Media; Paladin
- Release date: 5 November 2014
- Running time: 85 minutes
- Country: United States
- Language: English

Fugly! is a 2014 American comedy film directed by Alfredo De Villa and written by Kathy DeMarco and John Leguizamo. The film stars John Leguizamo, Radha Mitchell, Rosie Perez, Griffin Dunne, Yul Vazquez and Ally Sheedy. The film was released on 5 November 2014, by 108 Media and Paladin.

== Plot ==
Jesse is an unattractive man rejected by women because of his donkey-faced appearance. Jesse's life is comically chronicled while his existence becomes increasingly unbearable.

== Cast ==
- John Leguizamo as Jesse
- Radha Mitchell as Lara
- Rosie Perez as Zowie
- Griffin Dunne as Jefferey
- Yul Vazquez as Ray
- Ally Sheedy as Stoddard
- Tomas Milian as Gramps
- Olga Merediz as Moms
- Steven R. Kaufman as ER Doctor
