= Exposed (1983 film) =

1983 film by James Toback

- Theatrical release poster
- Directed by: James Toback
- Written by: James Toback
- Produced by: James Toback
- Starring: Nastassja Kinski; Rudolf Nureyev; Harvey Keitel; Ian McShane; Bibi Andersson
- Cinematography: Henri Decaë
- Edited by: Robert Lawrence
- Music by: Georges Delerue
- Production company: United Artists
- Distributed by: MGM/UA Entertainment Company
- Release date: April 22, 1983
- Running time: 100 minutes
- Country: United States
- Language: English
- Budget: $18 million
- Box office: $1.4 million

Exposed is a 1983 American drama film written, produced and directed by James Toback. It stars Nastassja Kinski, Rudolf Nureyev, Harvey Keitel, Ian McShane and Bibi Andersson.

== Plot ==
The subject of her professor's romantic designs, Elizabeth Carlson, a college girl from Wisconsin, packs up and moves to New York City, finding a job as a waitress. At the same time, she attempts to launch a career as a fashion model.

As her career takes off, she meets Daniel Jelline, a violinist, who stalks Elizabeth until they begin an affair. When work takes her to Paris, however, Elizabeth encounters a terrorist named Rivas, and her life is placed in considerable danger.

== Cast ==
- Nastassja Kinski as Elizabeth Carlson
- Rudolf Nureyev as Daniel Jelline
- Harvey Keitel as Rivas
- Ian McShane as Greg Miller
- Bibi Andersson as Margaret
- Ron Randell as Curt
- Pierre Clémenti as Victor "Vic"
- James Russo as Nick
- Tony Sirico as Record Store Thief
- James Toback as Leo Boscovitch
- Amy Steel as Party Guest
- Janice Dickinson and Iman appear as Models

== Production ==
James Toback claims he tried for a number of years to get the film financed but was unsuccessful. He says he won $2 million gambling in Las Vegas and spent a portion of this to bribe David Begelman, then head of MGM, to get him to authorise MGM to finance the film. MGM provided a budget of $18 million of which Toback's fee was $500,000. Filming took 80 days. Serge Silberman was executive producer.

Toback says he based the script on a romance he had with an airline stewardess.

"I've changed roughly 80% of the script I showed MGM," he said later, "and I write and rewrite every night."

This movie was filmed on UVM campus in Burlington, VT.

It was the last film role for Ron Randell before his death in 2005.

== Reception ==
"The movie is unlike anything being released by major studios today," said Toback at the time of the film's release, "and so its confusing to people who market movies". Toback was allowed to be involved in the promotion of the film. "I'm being treated a lot better than most studios would treat me," he said. "I'm not getting much money but I'm being treated a lot better than most studios treat me... I figure now I have a remote chance of putting across a movie that only got made by a miracle anyway."

Toback says the film had a "mixed" reception.
