= My Life as a Rolling Stone =

My Life as a Rolling Stone is a four part documentary series covering the lives of the Rolling Stones members Mick Jagger, Keith Richards, Charlie Watts, and Ron Wood. The installments each focused on a member and, with the exception of Watts, who died in 2021, included original interviews with the member in question. The series was considered by Rolling Stone reporter Will Hermes to be a tribute to Watts and a documentary series that "a new generation of musicians" can learn from, which he considers "justification enough for the whole project."

== Production and release ==
The series premiered 7 August 2022 and was directed by Oliver Murray and Clare Tavernor. It coincided with a two hour audio documentary broadcast on BBC Radio 2 that drew on hours of previously unheard archive interviews and rare performance recordings.

== Reception ==
Writing for the Los Angeles Times, critic Robert Lloyd commended the series, noting that it had "a little less emphasis on retelling the history and a little more on discussing the art"; Lloyd also noted that the members engaged in self-deprecating humour. Writing for CNN, Brian Lowry called the series "no slouch" in comparison to The Beatles: Get Back and a series that "shines a stadium-worthy spotlight on the Rolling Stones".
