= The Pick-up Artist (1987 film) =

Film by James Toback

- Theatrical release poster
- Directed by: James Toback
- Written by: James Toback
- Produced by: Warren Beatty; David Leigh MacLeod
- Starring: Molly Ringwald; Robert Downey; Dennis Hopper; Danny Aiello; Harvey Keitel
- Cinematography: Gordon Willis
- Edited by: David Bretherton; Angelo Corrao
- Music by: Georges Delerue
- Production company: 20th Century Fox
- Distributed by: 20th Century Fox
- Release date: September 18, 1987
- Running time: 81 minutes
- Country: United States
- Language: English
- Budget: $8 million
- Box office: $13.3 million

The Pick-up Artist is a 1987 American romantic comedy drama film produced and distributed by 20th Century Fox, written and directed by James Toback, starring Molly Ringwald and Robert Downey Jr. in the lead roles.

== Plot ==
Jack Jericho is a 21-year-old womaniser, constantly honing his craft. Driving around the city in a red convertible, he regularly jumps out and charms women wherever he goes. Stan, the principal at the school where he teaches, reprimands him for hitting on students' mothers.

Outside a club, Jack hits on Lulu, who is waiting in her mobster boyfriend Alonzo Scolara's convertible. Alonzo comes up and threatens Jack, who goes inside. Mobster Fernando Portacarrero insists he wants Randy Jensen, a young redhead in the bar who is getting noticed by many, including Jack.

Lulu follows Randy into the toilets, trying to convince her to go out with Fernando. Randy refuses and points out Lulu should not be doing his dirty work. Outside, Lulu argues with Alonzo, who decides to leave her there. Jack sees this, offers her a lift, and later a cop interrupts them as they are kissing.

The next morning, Jack helps his grandmother Nellie at home with her insulin. On his way back out, his landlord George reminds him the rent is overdue. Seeing Randy in the street, she surprises Jack by agreeing to have a quick fling in his car but refuses to give him her number. He follows her to work, seeing her being harassed before heading in.

Jack discovers that Randy is an independent museum tour guide who beats Jack at his own game. Randy's indifference only causes him to become smitten with her. Jack books a tour with one of his school groups, so he can continue flirting. Randy is too busy for romance, trying to keep her alcoholic gambler father Flash Jensen, out of harm's way.

Jack follows Randy to her apartment, pleading, as he cannot stop thinking about her. Alonzo and his goons then arrive to demand over $25,000 she owes them. Randy is reminded about the offer to have the debt forgiven if she spends the evening with mobster Fernando, but she again refuses. Randy has until noon the next day to deliver the money. Jack offers to help her, to no avail.

Jack and Randy go to Coney Island and Jack tries to win her a prize shooting baskets but fails. They go the museum's planetarium where Randy works to get her paycheque. They both go in to watch the show. There, Randy says she is going to be right back, but actually leaves.

Randy gets on a bus for Atlantic City unbeknownst to Jack. She starts up a conversation with fellow passenger Harriet, who talks about her long string of failed relationships. Randy suggests she keeps her interaction with men casual, so she cannot get hurt.

Going to his friend Phil Harper's café, Jack tells him about falling for Randy and the $25,000. They go together to see Flash, trying to find her. Realizing she has gone to Atlantic City, Phil drives them down. Just as they arrive, Randy is on the brink of winning all they need at blackjack. Overhearing a couple of mobsters talking to Flash, Jack realises she is his daughter and not his girlfriend.

Alonzo is called in to the casino by Patsy Cabaluso, the mobster running it, so he tries to block the casino from authorizing a large bet by Randy. Her $13,000 bet does not pay off. Jack catches up to her, and convinces Randy to let him help her. He sells his car for a little over $2,000, and after eating, they return to the casino. Playing the roulette table, Jack wins $35,000 which he uses to pay off Alonzo.

Although Jack has freed Randy and Flash from their debt and declares he wants them to be together forever, she insists they are bad for each other. He tears up his sheet of women's numbers and walks away. Back in New York City, Jack pays the missing two months' rent, and then encounters Randy outside. She invites him to dinner and they walk off together.

== Cast ==
- Molly Ringwald as Randy Jensen
- Robert Downey Jr. as Jack Jericho (credited on-screen as Robert Downey)
- Dennis Hopper as "Flash" Jensen
- Danny Aiello as Phil Harper
- Mildred Dunnock as Nellie
- Victoria Jackson as Lulu
- Frederick Koehler as Richie
- Bob Gunton as Fernando Portacarrero
- Harvey Keitel as Alonzo Scolara
- Tony Sirico as Patsy Cabaluso
- Brian Hamill as Mike
- Tamara Bruno as Karen
- Vanessa L. Williams as Rae
- Reni Santoni as Man in Train Station
- Angie Kempf as Jack's Student
- Polly Draper as Pat
- Victor Argo as Harris
- Robert Towne as Stan
- Lorraine Bracco as Carla
- Fred Melamed as George
- Joe Spinell as Eddie
- Daniel Smith as Casino Cashier
- Christine Baranski as Harriet

== Production ==
James Toback wrote the film for Warren Beatty who liked the script but was reluctant to play a character driven by his erotic compulsions. Toback then considered Robert De Niro but ultimately decided the role of Jack Jericho should be played by a younger actor.

The film was at Paramount. Then in 1984 Beatty bought it and set up the production at Fox. Toback says the film was "not even remotely" based on Beatty. "The guy in the script chases after people. Warren always has people chasing after him."

It was Toback's fourth film as director. He says his first three "were all dark movies that ended unhappily. Now I'm taking a vacation from dread and gloom. If you were casting Pick Up Artist 30 years ago you would have wanted Cary Grant and Irene Dunne. No two actors would have been more wrong for my other movies."

== Reception ==
=== Critical response ===
On Rotten Tomatoes the film holds a 58% rating based on 24 reviews. On Metacritic it has a score of 48% based on reviews from 15 critics, indicating "mixed or average" reviews. Audiences polled by CinemaScore gave the film an average grade of "C" on an A+ to F scale.

Janet Maslin of The New York Times wrote: "The film roams from the Upper West Side to Coney Island to Atlantic City, maintaining a lighthearted style that doesn't quite match the hints of obsessiveness in Mr. Toback's screenplay." Roger Ebert gave half a star out of four, and called it "an appallingly silly movie, from its juvenile comic overture to its dreadfully sincere conclusion."

=== Box office ===
The film opened at number 5 at the US box office, and finished 85th for the year in 1987, with a $13.9 million domestic gross.

== Home media ==
The film was released on VHS and Laserdisc in 1988, then on DVD on December 16, 2003.
