= James Toback =

American screenwriter and film director

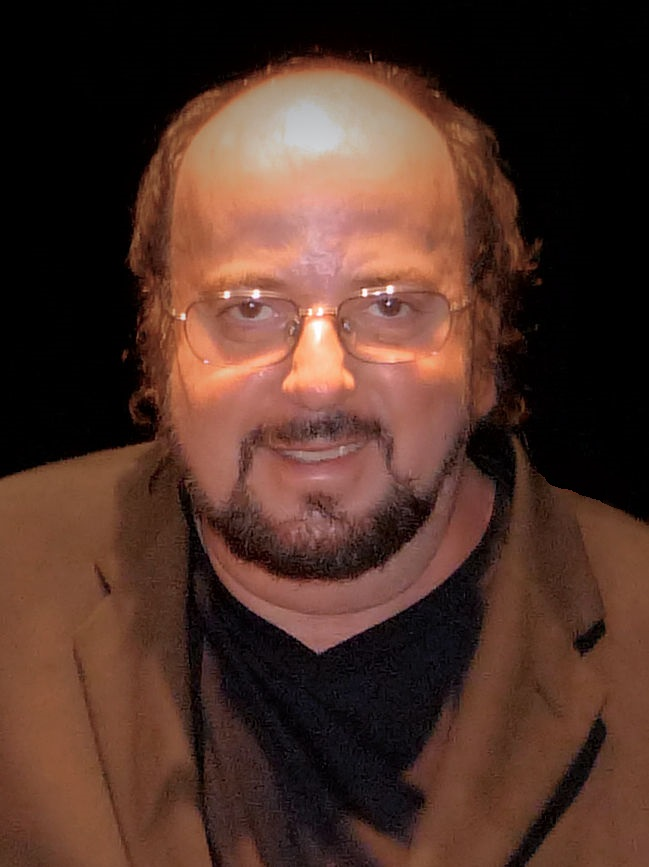
- Toback in 2009
- Born: James Lee Toback; November 23, 1944 (age 81); Manhattan, New York City, U.S.
- Education: Harvard University
- Occupations: Screenwriter; film director
- Spouses: Consuelo Sarah Churchill Vanderbilt Russell (m. 1968, divorced) Stephanie Kempf (current)

James Lee Toback (/ˈtuːbæk/, born November 23, 1944) is an American screenwriter and film director. He was nominated for the Academy Award for Best Original Screenplay in 1991 for Bugsy. He has directed films including The Pick-up Artist, Two Girls and a Guy and Black and White.

In 2018, the Los Angeles Times reported that 395 women had accused Toback of sexual harassment or assault over a 40-year period. Toback denied all the allegations. In 2022, 38 women filed a lawsuit in New York accusing him of sexual abuse. The suit eventually involved 40 accusers and, on April 9, 2025, resulted in a verdict and order against Toback requiring him to pay $1.68 billion to the women.

== Early life ==
Toback was born and raised in Manhattan, New York City, the only child of Jewish parents Irwin Lionel Toback and Selma Judith (née Levy). His father was vice president of Dreyfus Corporation. His mother was a president of the League of Women Voters and a moderator of political debates on NBC. His grandfather, Joseph Levy, was the founder of a clothing chain and real estate empire. Toback grew up in the Manhattan apartment building called The Majestic with his parents, who lived four floors below his grandfather. He befriended future film producer, Ed Pressman, who lived in the same building and later produced Toback's film, Harvard Man.

Toback graduated summa cum laude from Harvard University in 1966. He was an editor for The Harvard Crimson.

Toback spent three years teaching English at City College of New York and developed a gambling addiction.

An assignment from Esquire to write about football great and actor Jim Brown led to Brown's invitation to host Toback for an extended stay in Brown's Hollywood Hills home. Brown said that "along with both of us liking girls, I just like his intellect." Toback wrote a book about his experiences as Brown's house guest, Jim: The Author's Self-Centered Memoir of the Great Jim Brown (1971), which Salon described as "essentially a series of wild parties and orgies". Sociologist Calvin C. Hernton reviewed the book for The New York Times and wrote, "James Toback reveals as much about himself in this book as he does about his subject, Jim Brown."

== Film career ==
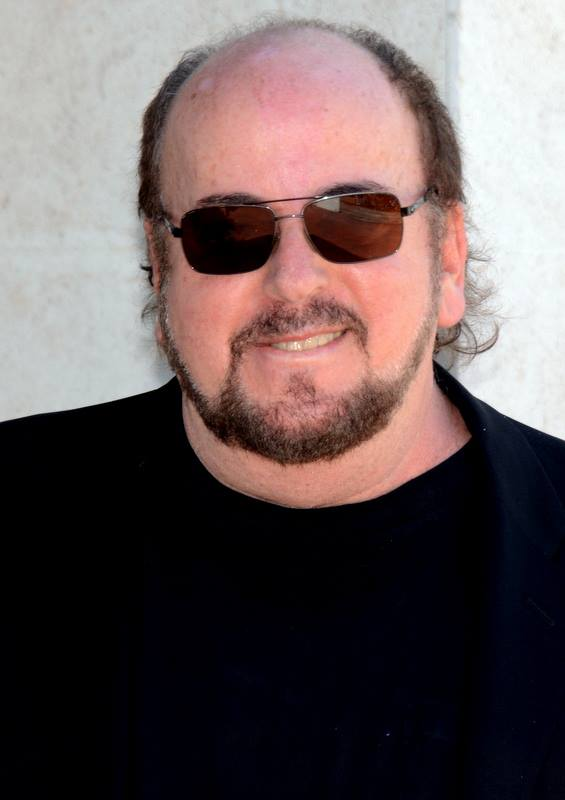
Toback at Cannes in 2013

Toback's first major film success was with writing the semi-autobiographical The Gambler, released in 1974. He credits actress and friend Lucy Saroyan, his literary agent Lynn Nesbit, and Nesbit's contact in film Mike Medavoy with getting his the script to director Karel Reisz and then to Paramount Pictures. For a year, Toback attached himself to Reisz "as his acolyte" in "the perfect mentor-protegé relationship," and he later described Reisz as "my one-man film school."

Toback's directorial début was the 1978 film Fingers, with Harvey Keitel. In her review of Fingers, film critic Pauline Kael wrote of Toback's "true moviemaking fever." Toback followed Fingers with Love and Money in 1982, Exposed in 1983, The Pick-up Artist in 1987, and the documentary The Big Bang in 1989.

In 1991, he wrote the screenplay for Bugsy, which won the 1991 Los Angeles Film Critics Association award for best screenplay of the year and was nominated for both the Academy Award for best original screenplay and for the Golden Globe best screenplay award.

Filmmaker Nicholas Jarecki examined Toback in a 2005 documentary The Outsider: A Film about James Toback.

Toback's documentary Tyson, which he directed and co-produced, was featured at the 2008 Cannes Film Festival, winning a prize in the festival's Un Certain Regard section. That film was nominated for best documentary awards in several United States competitions.

In 2009, the San Francisco International Film Festival selected Toback for its annual Kanbar Award for excellence in screenwriting.

Over his career, Toback's film direction has ranged from the large-scale and spectacular Exposed to the small-scale and single-setting Two Girls and a Guy, one of three Toback films that cast Robert Downey Jr. in a featured role. The Oldenburg International Film Festival selected Toback and his work for its 2008 "Retrospective." Other directors have since re-made two Toback films. French director Jacques Audiard's 2005 remake of Fingers as The Beat That My Heart Skipped won numerous Best Film awards. English director Rupert Wyatt re-made The Gambler in 2014.

== Critical reception ==
Film executive Richard Albarino is quoted as saying of Toback, "He never wrote or made anything he hadn't experienced first. He can't write fiction; he can only write diaries and dramatize them."

In 2005, critic Roger Ebert, who panned The Pick-up Artist but praised some of Toback's other films, said of Toback's directorial style, "He's alive. He's in your face. He's trying. He's trying to do something amazing. And to see somebody trying to do that even if they don't always succeed is much more interesting than to see somebody who is not even trying to do it in the first place."

Film historian and longtime friend David Thomson noted that "Jim is a member of a generation of young men who fell upon film with enormous creative excitement and did some very, very good work that has had a profound impact on cinema... But I do think that in that work in general, there is too much ignorance about how women see and feel the world and too little place for women in the work."

== Sexual misconduct allegations ==
Toback has been accused of sexually harassing young women.

An article in a 1989 issue of Spy magazine detailed how Toback would "hang out on the streets of the Upper West Side in New York City, and approach women. According to the story, he would in rapid-fire fashion tell them that he was a Hollywood director and offer to show them his Directors Guild of America card. The pitch invariably ended up with an invite to meet privately—sometimes at an outlandishly late hour—to talk about appearing in one of his films". The article, attributed to a pseudonym byline, was actually written by two women who had their own alleged encounters with Toback.

A 2002 Salon article noted Toback's reputation as a womanizer and pickup artist.

On October 22, 2017, Los Angeles Times columnist Glenn Whipp reported that 38 women have accused Toback of sexual harassment or assault. Toback denied these allegations, saying he had not met the women, or that if he had, it "was for five minutes" about which he had "no recollection". The alleged harassment occurred at meetings framed as interviews or casting auditions in places such as hotel rooms, movie trailers, or a public park where Toback asked questions pertaining to the women's sex lives and rubbed his crotch on them or masturbated. Accusers include actresses Rachel McAdams, Selma Blair, Terri Conn, Caterina Scorsone, Julianne Moore, Becky Wahlstrom, Cheryl Hines, and musician Louise Post. Toback claimed he was taking medication at the time of the alleged assaults that made it "biologically impossible" for the alleged actions to occur. In January 2018, Whipp reported that since the Times published its article in October 2017, a total of 395 women contacted the newspaper and said that Toback had sexually harassed them. The accounts stretch over a 40-year period. Toback has denied all these allegations as well.

In April 2018, Los Angeles County prosecutors declared they would not be pressing any charges against Toback. In one case, the victim did not turn up for an interview, and the rest were beyond the statute of limitations. Two of the declined cases involved misdemeanors, three involved felonies.

In December 2022, a civil lawsuit was filed against Toback through the New York state Supreme Court after the Adult Survivors Act suspended the statutes of limitations for cases involving sex offenses for a one-year period. The lawsuit involves 40 of his accusers. Toback issued a blanket denial, did not attend the trial, and acted as his own attorney. He did not show up for pre-trial hearings, leading to a default judgment against him. On April 9, 2025, a verdict was reached with an order for Toback to pay $1.68 billion to the accusers.

== Personal life ==
Toback is married to Stephanie Kempf, who had edited Toback's first documentary The Big Bang in 1989. Toback had married Consuelo Sarah Churchill Vanderbilt Russell in April 1968, a marriage that ended in divorce after a year.

== Filmography ==
Year	Title	Director	Writer	Producer	Notes
1974	The Gambler	No	Yes	No	
1978	Fingers	Yes	Yes	No	
1982	Love and Money	Yes	Yes	Yes	
1983	Exposed	Yes	Yes	Yes	
1987	The Pick-up Artist	Yes	Yes	No	
1991	Bugsy	No	Yes	No	Nominated − Academy Award for Best Original Screenplay; Nominated − Golden Globe Award for Best Screenplay
1997	Two Girls and a Guy	Yes	Yes	No	
1999	Black and White	Yes	Yes	No	
2001	Harvard Man	Yes	Yes	No	
2004	When Will I Be Loved	Yes	Yes	No	
2017	The Private Life of a Modern Woman	Yes	Yes	No	Later re-titled An Imperfect Murder

Documentary films

Year	Title	Director	Writer	Producer
1989	The Big Bang	Yes	Yes	No
2008	Tyson	Yes	Yes	Yes
2013	Seduced and Abandoned	Yes	Yes	Yes

Acting roles

- Exposed (1983)
- Alice (1990)
- Bugsy (1991)
- Black and White (1999)
- Death of a Dynasty (2003)
- When Will I Be Loved (2004)
- The Outsider (2005) (documentary)
- Mississippi Grind (2015)

Unproduced scripts

- The Life and Dreams of Frank Costello (1975—76)
- Vicky (1978)
- Shrink (early 1990s)
- Dreamer (1994)
- Love in Paris (1998)
- Untitled John DeLorean biopic (2009)
- Gotti: In the Shadow of My Father (2011)
- The Man Who Beat Vegas (2017)
