= Marjorie Heidsieck =

American commodities trader

- Born: c. 1947 (age 78–79); Detroit, Michigan, United States
- Education: University of Michigan
- Occupations: Commodities trader, lawyer
- Known for: First woman member of the New York Coffee and Sugar Exchange
- Children: 1, (Nicholas Jarecki)

Marjorie Heidsieck is an American commodities trader and attorney. She is known as a high-volume trader engaging in various complex trading styles including arbitrage between New York and Chicago gold as well as London and New York sugar.

She is a member of the New York Bar and became licensed to practice law in 2002. She has worked for the U.S. Securities and Exchange Commission (SEC), the Commodity Futures Trading Commission (CFTC), and Credit Suisse. Heidsieck was the first woman member of the New York Coffee and Sugar Exchange.

== Early life and education ==
Heidsieck was born and raised in Detroit, Michigan. She graduated a year early from Holy Redeemer High School to attend the University of Michigan. Moving to New York City, she graduated from New York University with a bachelor's degree and completed graduate courses in philosophy. She subsequently earned a Juris Doctor degree and became a member of the New York Bar.

== Career ==
Prior to her trading career, Heidsieck worked at Max's Kansas City, where she became friends with emerging artists from the SoHo scene, including a then-unknown Julian Schnabel. She also worked as a receptionist at Sumitomo, a Japanese corporation.

In 1974, Heidsieck began her career at Merrill Lynch where she was hired as a trainee stockbroker. She passed the Series 7 exam there and became increasingly interested in commodity futures markets.

Heidsieck moved to Dishy Easton and Company, a commodities broker. As an assistant trader, she learned New York–Chicago gold and silver arbitrage. This was her introduction to high-volume trading.

Heidsieck accepted an offer from Shearson Hayden Stone, then headed by Sanford I. Weill, for a position as an assistant in Shearson’s foreign exchange department. There she traded foreign currencies, booked pound sterling for traders in London, and traded sugar, coffee, and precious metals. Heidsieck qualified for the President’s Council during her first year at Shearson based on her performance and volume of trading.

In 1978, Heidsieck became the first woman member admitted to the New York Coffee and Sugar Exchange in its 96-year history. She earned full floor trading privileges in coffee and sugar and later acquired a seat on COMEX.

In 1978, an Esquire magazine article reported that she earned approximately $1 million the previous year from her trading activities.

In 1982, Success magazine profiled her as a “$2 Million Woman,” trading across global markets, including Chicago, New York, London, Hong Kong and Tokyo.

Heidsieck founded the Miller Commodity Corporation serving as its Chief Executive Officer and became general partner of the Rosebud Commodity Futures Fund which was offered to the public. The fund traded a diversified portfolio of commodities, including precious metals, grains, interest-rate futures, stock index futures, and energies.

Heidsieck later became an attorney and member of the New York Bar. She worked for the Commodity Futures Trading Commission, Division of Enforcement. She also worked at Credit Suisse in the regulatory division. She continues to do pro-bono legal work.

== Personal life ==
Heidsieck is the mother of Nicholas Jarecki, an American filmmaker known for Arbitrage (2012) and Crisis (2021).
