= Addison O'Dea =

American filmmaker

- Born: Hugh Addison White O'Dea; June 15, 1979 (age 47); New York City, U.S.
- Education: New York University (BSc)
- Occupations: Explorer; film director; screenwriter
- Known for: Anthropology; ethnography; war; history; religion
- Partner(s): Minnie Driver (2019–present; engaged)
- Website: addisonodea.com

Addison O'Dea (/oʊˈdeɪ/, oh-DAY; born June 15, 1979) is an American filmmaker and writer who specializes in anthropology. His work has been published and broadcast by National Geographic, Discovery, and Ozy.

== Family and education ==
Hugh Addison White O'Dea was born on June 15, 1979, in New York Hospital to Sara (née Greenway) and Hugh Patrick O'Dea Jr. He has two younger brothers. Based in New York City, the family traveled internationally extensively for both personal and professional reasons.

O'Dea was a boarding student at Indian Mountain School in Lakeville, Connecticut. O'Dea attended the Dwight School in Manhattan for international baccalaureate and holds a BSc from New York University.

O'Dea's father, Hugh Patrick O'Dea Jr., was murdered in Louisville, Kentucky in August 2007.

== Work ==
O'Dea, a former contributing editor at National Geographic Traveler, has written and directed a number of virtual reality documentary films focusing on subjects such as the origin of voodoo through West African Vodun in Togo and Benin; and ancient Quranic libraries in the Sahara.

As of 2019, O'Dea was producing an action film set in the Sahara written and directed by Eugene Jarecki. Featuring a Tuareg character as the protagonist, the working title is "Tuareg Project". It was reported in 2021 that O'Dea is directing a feature film financed by Fifth Season titled Unlikely Heroes. He is the Executive Producer of Eugene Jarecki's The Six Billion Dollar Man which premiered at the 2025 Cannes Film Festival where it won the L'Œil d'or jury prize for best documentary.

=== Discovery TRVLR ===
His largest project to date is writing and directing the thirty six-episode series Discovery TRVLR for Discovery, Inc. and Google. Filmed on all seven continents, the series centers around a "Guru, Renegade, Entertainer or Explorer" in each environment as they pull the curtain back on varying rituals, unique traditions and life-threatening quests that encompass their culture." At that time, Discovery TRVLR was Discovery's largest virtual reality project to date.

The series was designed by O'Dea to go to as remote locations as possible and focus on the universality of the people who live there. Rather than sending a message of 'we are all the same' or forcing Western ideals on the characters, the idea is to create an elegant juxtaposition at a hyperlocal level. "Defying convention" in Communist Vietnam is significantly different when contrasted alongside the same idea in Catholic Mexico.

From an interview with Addison in Filmmaker about the show:

A core tenet of TRVLR is access, getting into closed communities that are otherwise not open to visitors. Given how popular the travel genre is, you have to work harder as a producer and director to seek out these communities and earn their trust. That meant we were shooting in locations that required negotiations for safe passage through gangland and armed security.

== Personal life ==
In September 2019, O'Dea was reported to be engaged to actress Minnie Driver.

== Additional reading ==
- Essay by O'Dea on the principles of Vietnamese Buddhism in the afterlife in OZY
- Essay by O'Dea on the religious cult of Santa Muerte in Monster Children
- O'Dea being interviewed on Cheddar
