= The King (2017 American film) =

2017 documentary film by Eugene Jarecki

- Theatrical release poster
- Directed by: Eugene Jarecki
- Written by: Eugene Jarecki; Christopher St. John
- Produced by: Christopher St. John; David Kuhn
- Starring: Alec Baldwin; Chuck D.; Rosanne Cash; Van Jones; Ethan Hawke; Emmylou Harris; EmiSunshine; Mike Myers
- Cinematography: Tom Bergmann; Christopher Frierson; Taylor Krauss; Étienne Sauret
- Edited by: Simon Barker; Alex Bingham; Èlia Gasull Balada; Laura Israel
- Music by: Antony Genn; Robert Miller; Martin Slattery
- Distributed by: Oscilloscope Laboratories
- Release dates: May 20, 2017 (Cannes); June 22, 2018 (United States)
- Running time: 107 minutes
- Country: United States
- Language: English
- Box office: $259,291

The King is a 2017 American documentary film directed and co-written by American filmmaker, author and two-time Sundance nominee Eugene Jarecki. As indicated in the film title, the documentary is about Elvis Presley and America during his career. Blending archival footage, celebrity interviews and footage of significant American events such as the twin towers collapse, the documentary adopts Presley as a metaphor for the rise and fall of the American Dream.

Perspectives which are drawn upon in the evaluation of Presley's career include; Rosanne Cash, Alec Baldwin and Emmylou Harris. Captured across America in influential cities such as; Memphis, Las Vegas and New York, much of the documentary occurs within Presley's own car, a 1963 Rolls-Royce Phantom V which was bought by production for the film. Adopting the American film trope of the ‘highway narrative’ in the narration of the rise and fall of Presley and America, the documentary considers themes of race, materialism and success through the lens of musicians, historians, actors and journalists.

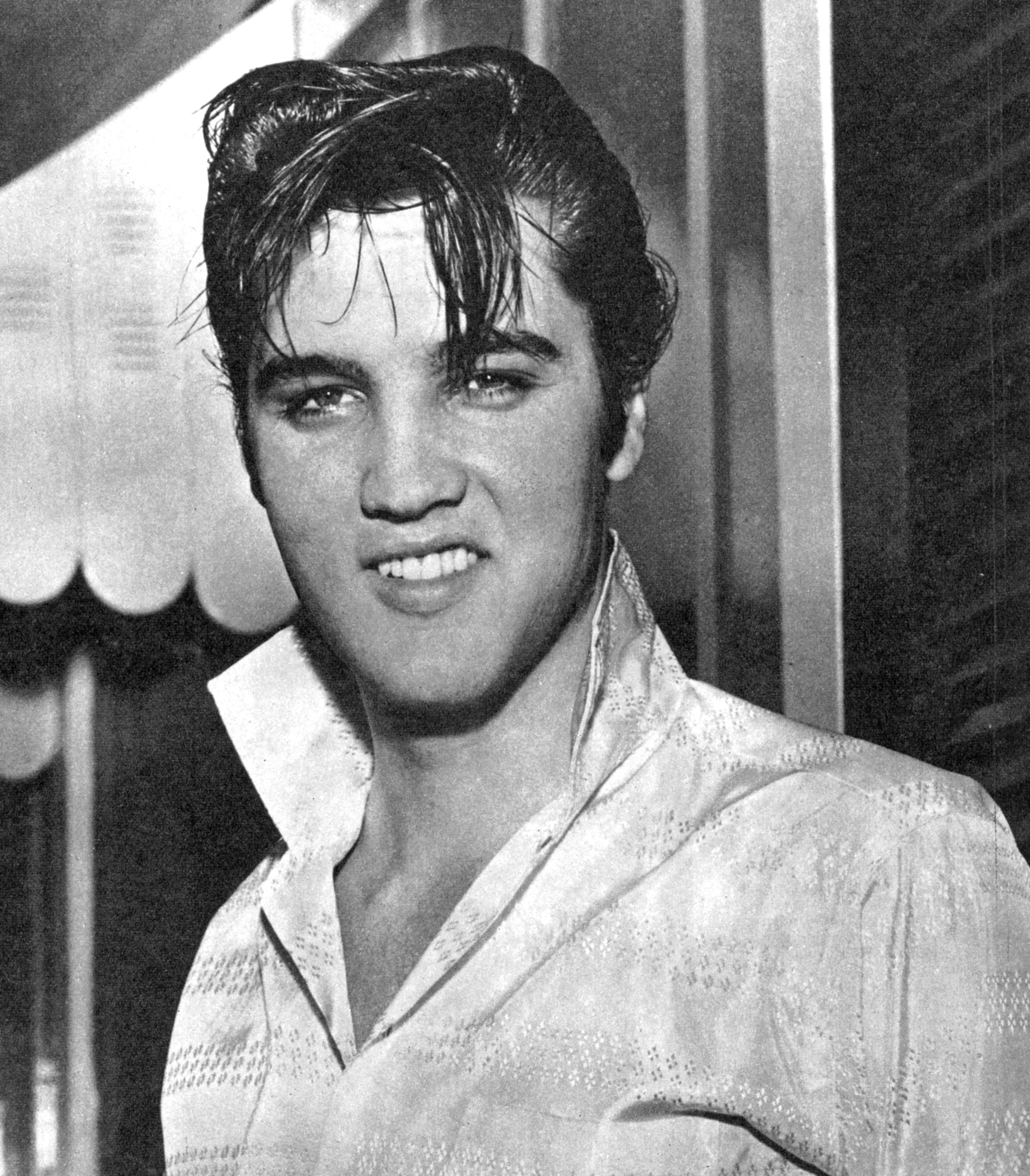
Young Elvis Presley

The film had its North American premiere at the 2018 Sundance Film Festival, after its international premiere at the 2017 Cannes Film Festival. It was released in the United States on June 22, 2018. Between its premiere at Cannes and its commercial release, the film's named was changed from Promised Land to The King. Described as, “the best recent film about how the hell we got here; and more” by David Ehrlich from IndieWire”, The King proved highly popular. Receiving an average rating of 7.2/10 by review aggregation website Rotten Tomatoes, the documentary generated $29,050 in domestic gross profit during the opening weekend of June 22 to June 24 and was nominated for Best Documentary and Outstanding Historical Documentary at the News & Documentary Emmy Awards. The documentary was additionally nominated for the Best Music Film at the Grammy Awards, and the Golden Eye award at the Cannes Film Festival.

== Synopsis ==
Released 40 years after Elvis Presley's death in 1977, the film follows documentarian Eugene Jarecki as he travels in a 1963 Rolls-Royce Phantom V once owned by Elvis Presley to various cities across America, including Tupelo, Mississippi, Memphis, Tennessee, New York City and Las Vegas. The film is captured almost entirely on the road, with the Rolls-Royce functioning both as a mode of transportation and a place for discussions with musicians, celebrities, journalists and historians about Elvis, music, success and America. Archival footage is incorporated through the film.

Much of the film's focus is on African American viewpoints, especially in terms of Presley's appropriation of blues music and limited contribution to the Civil Rights Movement, criticism. The documentary includes vintage film clips of blues artists who influenced Presley, including Bukka White, Big Bill Broonzy, Arthur "Big Boy" Crudup, Otis Spann, B.B. King, John Lee Hooker, Howlin' Wolf, Jimmy Reed, Earl Hooker, and Muddy Waters. In-car discussions with Van Jones, Chuck D and TV auteur David Simon contextualize Presley's success in light of white supremacy, black heritage and cultural appropriation. Jones is particularly vocal, expressing his frustration with a man who, “owed his career to sounds pioneered by black people but couldn’t speak out on behalf of the Civil Rights Movement”.

While initially positive in its portrayal of Presley and his rise to success, through the connecting of archival footage to excited fans, Jarecki reflects Elvis’ rapid decline through the blending of increasingly chaotic footage. Overlaying fast tempo music, Jarecki conveys Presley's fall through footage of the twin towers burning, candidates rallying and Barney the purple dinosaur waving. Leaving audiences to question what happened to Elvis Presley and broader America, the documentary concludes with a pale, drugged Elvis seated on stage at a piano singing "Unchained Melody."

== Themes ==
The central themes of Eugene Jarecki's 2017 documentary include; the rise and fall of Elvis Presley, and the rise and fall of America in the 21st century. Explored through the blending of archival footage, the rise and fall of both 'the king of rock ’n’ roll' and the 'superpower nation’, these themes are further affirmed through the documentary's title, which identifies Presley as ‘the king’ of the nation throughout his career. Transitioning from a young rebellious performer to a commercialized celebrity churning out feature films and making self-parodying jokes of himself in Las Vegas, audiences are able to document his decline before reflecting on the potential fate of their own nation. Warning America of the dangers of obsession with financial gain and excess, the rise and fall of both Presley and the nation is linked to the theme of race. Jarecki explores this theme visually, through archival footage of Chuck Berry, the forgotten pioneer of Rock ’n’ Roll audibly, through the overlay of Public Enemy’s ‘Fight the Power’ which states, “Elvis was a hero to most / But he never meant shit to me you see / Straight up racist that sucker was” within the documentary, and literally through discussion with influential African American musicians and school students.

The King additionally explores the themes of excess and materialism through Elvis Presley's 1963 Rolls-Royce. Distanced from reality through its transportation of celebrities throughout the documentary, the Rolls-Royce becomes an eerie and sad setting, as the car travels through impoverished towns, and is overlaid with jarring footage of Presley during his decline. Similarly to Elvis, the car is deceiving, as from one angle it appears luxurious, and from another, it appears incredibly isolating. Bought specifically for the film in 2014 for $369000, Jarecki's selection of the Rolls-Royce was intentional, as in comparison to a Cadillac or a Thunder Bird which he described as, “American Dream Machines”, the Rolls-Royce can be considered less expected. Its antique features prove incompatible with modernity much like Presley towards the end of his career.

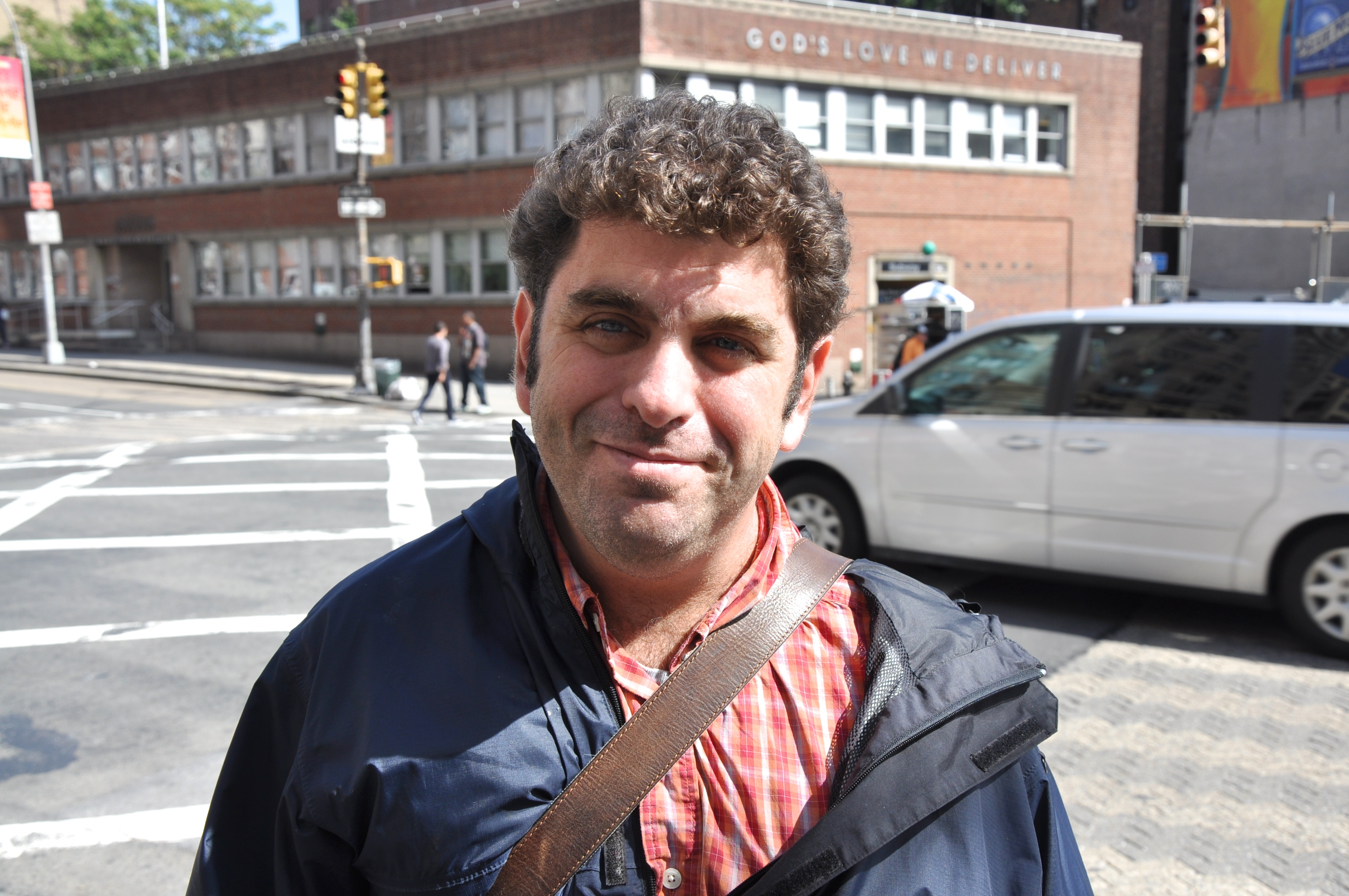
Documentary Director/ Producer- Eugene Jarecki

== Cast & Crew ==
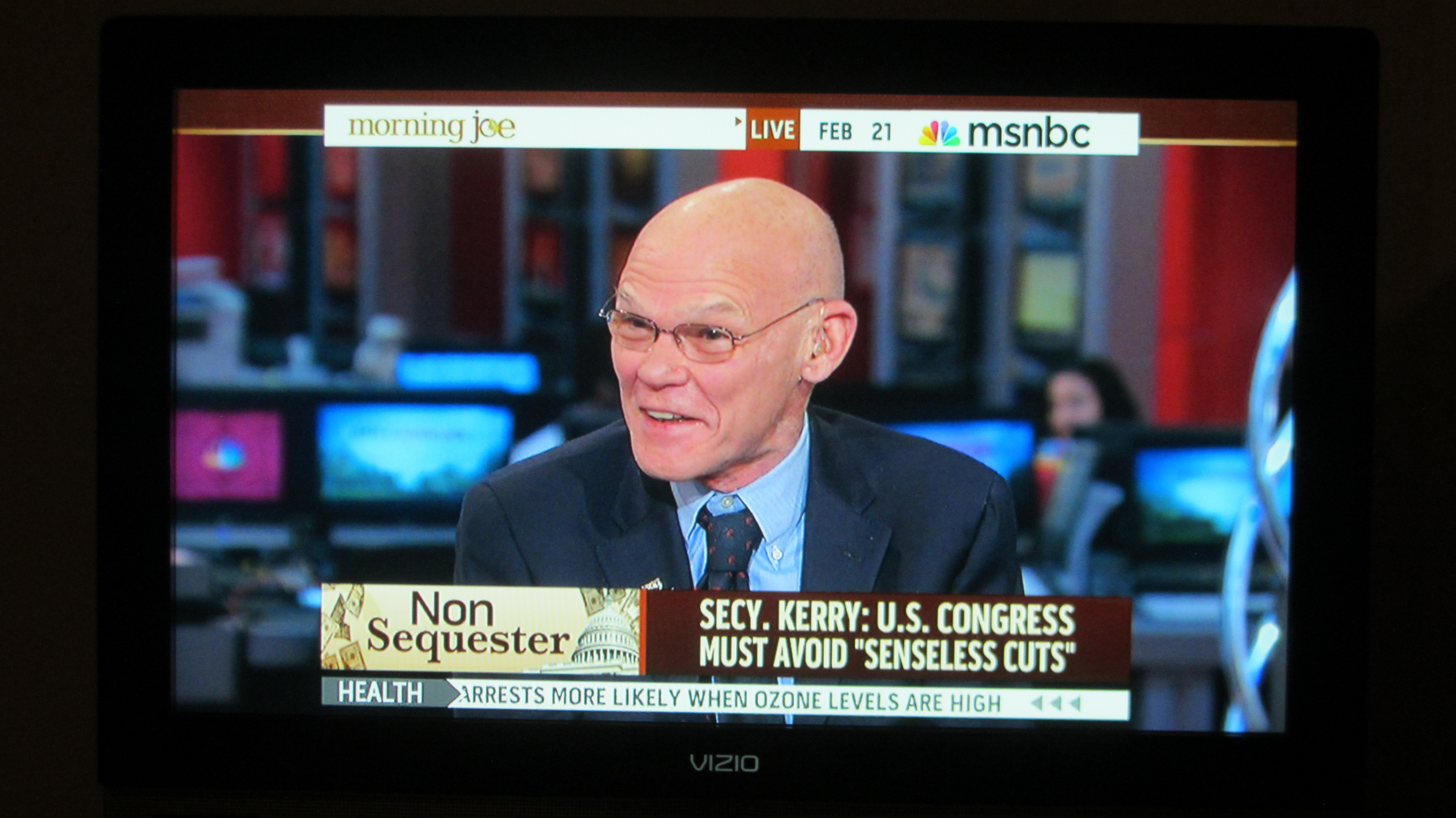
James Carville

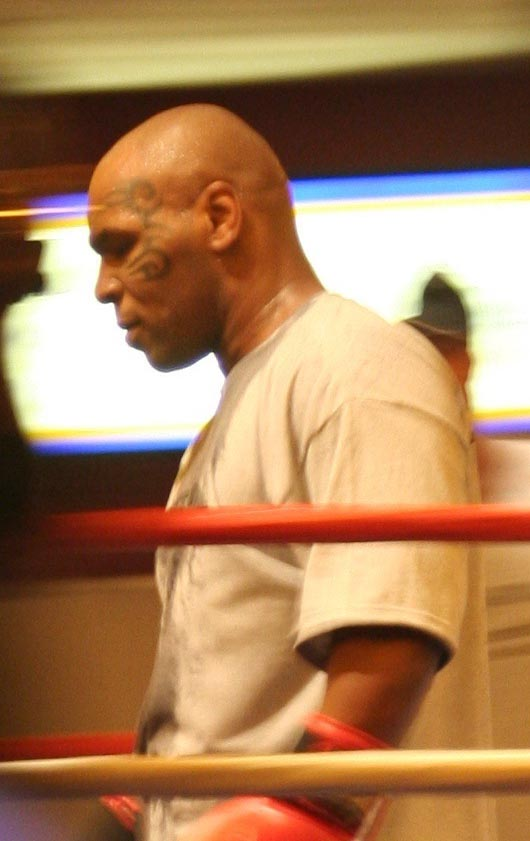
Mike Tyson

=== Central Cast ===
Elvis Presley	Self (Archival Footage)
Eugene Jarecki	Self (Film Director, Producer & Narrator)
James Carville	Self (US Political Analyst)
Mike Tyson	Self (Archival Footage)

==== Documentary Features ====
Muhammad Ali	self (archive footage)
Steve Allen	self (archive footage)
Alec Baldwin	self
Harry Belafonte	self (archive footage)
Nicki Bluhm and the Gramblers	themselves
Marlon Brando	self (archive footage)
Sharon Brave	self
Monique Brave	self
Tony Brown	self
Forrest Carter	self/1950s KKK leader (archive footage)
Maggie Clifford	self /Kat & Maggie
Marc Coper	self (author of ‘The Last Honest Place in America: Paradise and Perdition in the New Las Vegas)
Chuck D	self
Terri Davidson	self
Jane Fonda	self (archive footage)
Radney Foster	self
Steve Fraser	self (historian)
Mary Gauthier	self
Larry Geller	self (personal hairstylist to Elvis Presley)
Wayne Gerster	self
Freddie Glusman	self (owner of Piero’s Italian Cuisine)
Peter Guranick	self (author of ‘Last train to Memphis: The Rise of Elvis Presley’ and ‘Careless Love: The Unmaking of Elvis Presley’)
Emmylou Harris	self
Ethan Hawke	self
John Hiatt	self
Billie Holiday	self (archive footage)
Van Jones	self (founder of Rebuild the Dream)
George Klein	self (author of ‘Elvis: My Best Man’)
Ashton Kutcher	self
John Lennon	self (archive footage)
Martin Luther King	self (archive footage)
Greil Marcus	self
Justin Merrick	self
Scotty Moore	self
Eddie Murphy	self (archive footage)
Mike Myers	self
Richard Nixon	self (archive footage)
Tom Parker	self (archive footage)
Jerry Phillips	self (son of producer Sam Phillips)
Trevor Porter	self (Chairman of the United States Federal Election Commission)
Gladys Presley	self (archive footage)
Priscilla Presley	self (archive footage)
Jussi Pylkkanen	self (archive footage)
Franklin D. Roosevelt	self (archive footage)
Dale Rushing	self (Elvis impersonator)
Bernie Sanders	self
Luc Sante	self (music critic)
Jerry Schilling	self
Frank Sinatra	self (archive footage)
Brett Sparks	self (The Handsome Family)
Ed Sullivan	self (archive footage)
EmiSunshine	self
Earlice Taylor	self
Dan Rather	self
Nancy Rooks	self (Elvis Presley's housekeeper at Graceland)
Immortal Technique	self
Linda Thompson	self
Big Mama Thornton	self (archive footage)
Donald Trump	self (archive footage)
Vince Varnado	self
M.Ward	self
Leo Bud Wech	self
A.C Wharton	self (Mayor of the City of Memphis)
Lawrence Wikerson	self (retired United States Army Colonel
Kat Wright	self (Kat & Maggie)
Mark Wright	self (Nashville record producer)
The Beatles	Themselves (archive footage)

== Production ==
=== Pre-Production ===
The documentary's central director and producer Eugene Jarecki is award-winning in his investigative documentary field. Winning the Sundance Grand Jury Prize for his 2002 film The Trials of Henry Kissinger, Jarecki went on to win the 2005 Peabody Award for his 2005 film Why We Fight. Jarecki's success in both the directing and production of films continued with his viral 2010 short film Move Your Money, which functioned to encourage Americans to shift their money from “too big to fail” banks to community banks and credit unions in response to the 2008 financial crisis. Jarecki's interest in the investigation of America and its values, as reflected through The King, is further evidenced through his 2013 film The House I Live In. Winning the Grand Jury Prize at the Sundance Film Festival as well as, a second Peabody award, Jarecki's critique of America through the exploration of the nation's war on drugs led to the conception of the article subject The King.

=== Production ===
An organic and continually altered process, the production of Jarecki's 2017 film The King took 2 years. Specifically, this included; filming which occurred between 2015 and 2016, and editing which occurred between 2016 and 2017. The conception of The King came to Jarecki while touring for his 2013 film The House I Live In. Stunned by the nation's transformation from patriotism to disillusionment prior to Trump’s 2016 election, Jarecki described the nation’s transition during a film-related interview, as an “overnight transformation into fat Elvis”.

While confident in the exploration of Elvis Presley's rise and fall as a metaphor for America, the documentary's road trip method was not Jarecki's original concept. Originally planning to convey the “young nation’s rapid transformation solely through archival footage and direct interviews, Jarecki’s decision to change this method prevailed as a result of his vision to unify the film. As, through the exploration of Presley, Jarecki wanted viewers to resonate with the film personally, deciding for themselves whether they resonate more with Presley’s story or the broader exploration of the American Dream. This was further enforced through the choice of the car for the film. Buying Presley’s 1963 Phantom V Rolls-Royce at Bonham’s auction in 2014 for $396000, Jarecki selected the Rolls-Royce over a Cadillac or Thunder Bird, as he believed the Rolls-Royce more authentically reflected the “venturing off-script” of the country boy and the nation.

Although aware of Presley's story, and the significant locations which framed his rise and fall, Jarecki's integration of interviews throughout the documentary were spontaneous, often occurring within real-time. A prominent example of this was Jarecki's interviewing of students in Memphis. Discussing Elvis Presley and the issues of race and appropriation, the students authenticated the interview sequence in their singing of gospel songs and reclaiming of blues music conventions. Stating within an interview that there is, “a virtue in just showing up”, the organic production of the 2017 documentary is further evidenced through filming in Nashville. Turning up to the significant location with no plan or contacts, it was through conversation with locals that Jarecki became acquainted with the country singer EmiSunshine who became a central interviewee for the documentary.

=== Post-Production ===
Premiered as Promised Land at the 2017 Cannes film festival, The King was further edited prior to its commercial release. Trimmed and made more concise, the documentary shifted from a broad exploration of Elvis Presley as a metaphor for America, to a nonfiction chronicle urging audiences to consider What happened to America? This questioning is specifically in relation to the nation's distance from reality, and obsession with wealth and material gain. Warning audiences of the dangers of transitioning into the ‘Fat Elvis’, the final documentary presents the rise and fall of Elvis Presley as a rehearsal and warning of the rise and fall of America.

== Reception ==
=== Box office ===
Commercially released in the United States on June 22, 2018, after its international premiere at the 2017 Cannes Film Festival, the film generated $29,050 from two New York City theatres in its opening weekend. An average profit of $14,525 per venue, the film was the third-best of the weekend and one of the best of the year for documentaries.

=== Critical response ===
The documentaries positive reception is affirmed by the review aggregation website Rotten Tomatoes, in which the film holds an approval rating of 78% based on 86 reviews, and an average rating of 7.2/10. The website's critical consensus reads, "The King pursues a wildly ambitious thesis through some fairly bumpy territory, but emerges as a provocative and insightful look at modern America." On Metacritic, the film has a weighted average score of 70 out of 100, based on 30 critics, indicating "generally favorable reviews". This positive reception is supported by Steve Pond who described the film as, “hugely moving and enormously bombastic in a way that is pure Elvis” and the film's nomination for multiple awards as reflected in the table below. Criticisms of the film are limited, with the only major criticism referring to the documentaries inconsistency in storytelling. This is acknowledged by Wall Street journalist Joe Morgenstern who described it as, “ fascinating and infuriating in unequal parts, the latter far outweighing the former”.

=== Award Nomination ===
Best Documentary & Outstanding Historical Documentary	News & Documentary Emmy Awards	Nominee
Best Music Film	Grammy Awards	Nominee
Golden Eye Award	Cannes Film Festival	Nominee
