= Eugene Jarecki =

American filmmaker

- Born: October 5, 1969 (age 56); New Haven, Connecticut, U.S.
- Education: Princeton University
- Occupation: Film director
- Notable work: Why We Fight (2005); The King (2017)
- Parent: Henry Jarecki (father)
- Family: Andrew Jarecki (brother); Tom Jarecki (brother); Nicholas Jarecki (half-brother)

Eugene Jarecki (born October 5, 1969) is an American documentary filmmaker. He is best known for his films Why We Fight, Reagan, and The House I Live In.

His other films include The Trials of Henry Kissinger, Freakonomics, The King, and Quest of the Carib Canoe. His most recent feature, The Six Billion Dollar Man won the L'Œil d'or Jury Prize at the Cannes Film Festival and the Golden Globe Prize for Documentary in 2025.

To date, Jarecki and his films have won the Grand Jury Prize (twice) and a Special Jury Prize at the Sundance Film Festival, two Emmy's, two Peabody Awards, a Golden Globe, a Grierson Award, a Grimme-Preis, and the L'Œil d'or Jury Prize at the Cannes Film Festival. His work has also been nominated for several other Emmy's, an Independent Spirit Award, a Grammy, and a Writers Guild of America award.

Jarecki, described as a "a public intellectual on domestic and international affairs" is a Senior Fellow at Brown University's Watson Institute for International and Public Affairs and has also been a Soros Justice Fellow at the Open Society Foundations. Jarecki is the author of two books including The American Way of War: Guided Missiles, Misguided Men, and a Republic in Peril (Simon & Schuster).

== Early life and education ==
Jarecki was born in New Haven, Connecticut to Henry Jarecki and Gloria Jarecki, a former film critic at Time magazine. Jarecki grew up in New York with his brothers Andrew Jarecki (The Jinx, Capturing the Friedmans) and pilot Tom Jarecki. They also have a half-brother Nicholas Jarecki (Arbitrage). All four brothers are in the film industry, most notably Andrew who has also won the Sundance Grand Jury Prize and Emmy award for his own films and series.

After graduating from the Hackley School in 1987, Eugene attended Princeton University. There he trained as a stage director, but pivoted into film, where he experienced early success. His first short film, Season of the Lifterbees, a Gaelic fairy tale told in jabberwocky, premiered at the 1993 Sundance Film Festival where it won the Student Academy Award. The film also won the Time Warner Grand Prize at the Aspen Film Festival.

Soon after graduating university, Jarecki was doing ad-hoc work in media strategy for several politicians in the U.S. and was invited to go to Guantanamo Bay in Cuba as part of a State Department delegation. The purpose of the delegation was to investigate a crisis involving migrants who had been apprehended at sea and were suspected by the U.S. government of being HIV-positive. The migrants were then subsequently detained inside the American base in Guantanamo Bay. The Rev. Jesse Jackson had also come to mediate the hunger strike. After witnessing the conditions, Jackson instead joined the hunger strike—all of which Jarecki captured on film. This event inspired his commitment to documentary film.

== Career ==
=== Film and television ===
In 2000, Jarecki’s first feature documentary film, Quest of the Carib Canoe was distributed by BBC Two. It documents an effort by indigenous Carib Indians on the Island of Dominica to build an ancient ocean-going canoe and retrace their ancestors' path from South America's Orinoco Delta in what is now modern Guyana to the islands of the Caribbean.

His second film that year was a dramatic feature called The Opponent released by Lionsgate.

In 2002, his first theatrical documentary feature The Trials of Henry Kissinger was released. Based on the book The Trial of Henry Kissinger by Christopher Hitchens, this film is the first of Jarecki's sweeping indictments of the perils of power. The film was the winner of the 2002 Amnesty International Award and was nominated for an Independent Spirit Award. Trials has been broadcast in over thirty countries and launched the Sundance Channel's DOCday venture in the U.S. as well as the BBC's digital channel, BBC Four in the U.K.

Jarecki distinguished himself as a filmmaker unafraid of serious, penetrating investigations with his 2005 film Why We Fight about the role of America's military-industrial complex in leading the nation into the tragic quagmire of the Iraq War. The film won both the Sundance Grand Jury Prize and a Peabody Award. He also received a nomination for Best Documentary Screenplay from the Writers Guild of America for the film.

Alongside directors Alex Gibney, Morgan Spurlock, and Rachel Grady, Jarecki directed a segment of the 2010 feature Freakonomics based on the 2005 book Freakonomics: A Rogue Economist Explores the Hidden Side of Everything by Steven D. Levitt and Stephen J. Dubner. The film premiered at the Tribeca Film Festival that year.

In 2011, Jarecki returned to the Sundance Film Festival with his Emmy Award-winning film Reagan which went on to be released in the U.S. by HBO on what would have been the 40th President's 100th birthday. The next year, The House I Live In, his film about America's war on drugs, won Jarecki a second Grand Jury Prize at Sundance as well as a second Peabody Award. Achieving a level of mainstream recognition, the film's producers included Danny Glover, John Legend, Brad Pitt, and Russell Simmons. In order to create a genuine impact, the film was exhibited in over 130 U.S. prisons, churches, and statehouses, as well as on Capitol Hill. Along with the music video of the same name, featuring John Legend, and the viral short Just Say No...to the War on Drugs, (both directed by Jarecki), the film is credited with changing the national conversation on U.S. drug policy.

In 2014, Jarecki took part in the first Ted Talk in the history of Cuba at Havana's Teatro Nacional. Events that occurred in the days leading up to the talk became the subject of Jarecki's 2016 short film, The Cyclist (El Ciclista) which he directed for The New Yorker/Amazon.

Jarecki served as executive producer on the 2015 documentary feature film (T)ERROR, directed by Lyric Cabral and David Felix Sutcliff, which won Jarecki a Sundance Special Jury Prize and his second Emmy Award. That same year, he also executive produced Laura Israel's feature documentary Don't Blink – Robert Frank about the late legendary photographer's work and career.

His next film, The King, produced by Steven Soderbergh, Errol Morris, and Rosanne Cash, premiered at both the Cannes Film Festival and Sundance. Nominated for a Grammy Award for Best Music Film, The King is a musical road trip in Elvis Presley's 1963 Rolls-Royce that features Alec Baldwin, Chuck D, Emmylou Harris, Mike Myers, Rosanne Cash, Van Jones, and Ethan Hawke, among others. All are party to tracing the rise and fall of Elvis as a metaphor for the country he left behind. Alongside the film, Jarecki created a series of music videos for artists such as Lana Del Rey, M. Ward, The Handsome Family, Immortal Technique, and the Stax Music Academy All-Stars.

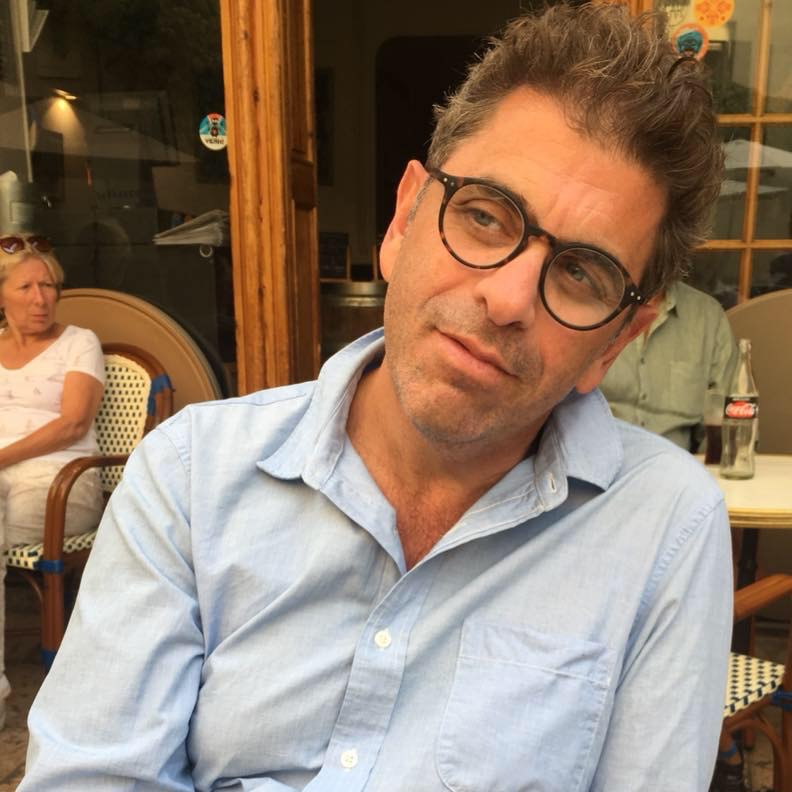
Jarecki in 2019

In 2018, Jarecki's first public contemporary art exhibit, entitled Promised Land, was featured at Miami Art Basel as part of "This is Not America" at the Faena Hotel, Miami Beach. A multiscreen video presentation, Promised Land was inspired by Jarecki's 2018 film, The King.

In 2019, it was announced that Jarecki is returning to dramatic filmmaking with a yet-untitled action film about a Saharan, Tuareg nomad, who seeks revenge for a crime committed against his tribal customs. Jarecki wrote the screenplay with his son Jonas Jarecki, based on a best-selling novel. Addison O'Dea is producing.

=== Public policy ===
As a public intellectual on U.S. domestic and international policy, Jarecki has appeared on a variety of national television programs including The Daily Show, The Colbert Report, Real Time with Bill Maher, Fox & Friends, and Charlie Rose. In 2010, he created the short film Move Your Money, encouraging Americans to move their banking from "too big to fail" banks into smaller community banks and credit unions. It became a viral sensation leading to an estimated 4 million Americans moving their money out of major banks.

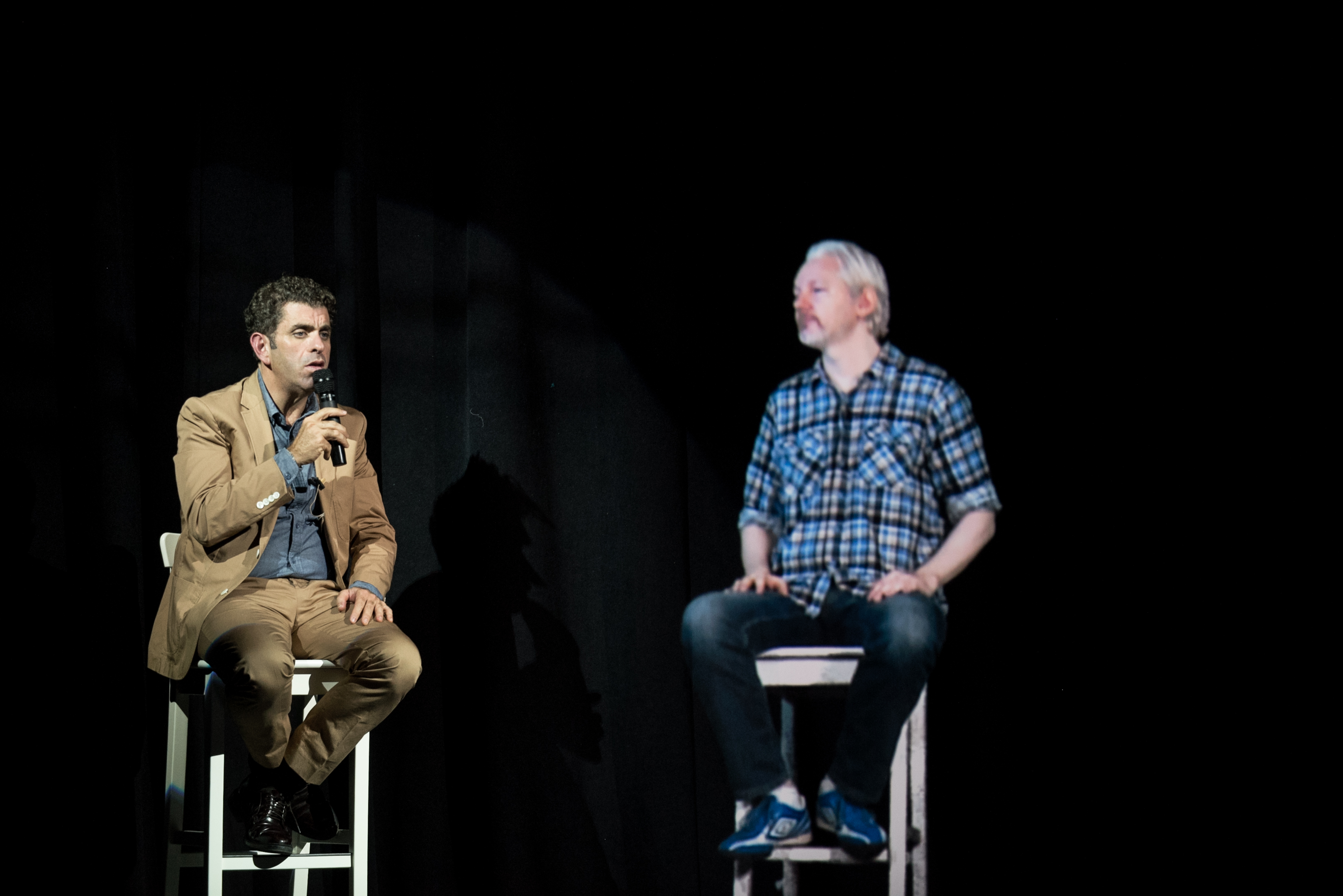
Eugene Jarecki and Julian Assange as a hologram

Jarecki is also the founder and executive director of The Eisenhower Project, an academic public policy group, dedicated, in the spirit of Dwight D. Eisenhower, to studying the forces that shape American foreign policy. He has been a visiting fellow at Brown University's Watson Institute for International Studies and is the author of The American Way of War (2008), published by Simon & Schuster/Free Press.

Jarecki has also participated as a speaker at several international conferences including Ted, Nantucket Project, and will.i.am's "TRANS4M" gathering for the i.am.angel Foundation.

At the 2014 Nantucket Project, Jarecki conducted a public interview with WikiLeaks editor-in-chief Julian Assange as a hologram, beamed in to Nantucket from his place of asylum at the Ecuadorian Embassy in London.

Jarecki wrote in The Guardian before the event, "it crosses my mind I may be abetting a crime or violating international extradition laws. But I reassure myself that, in this regard, the worldwide web remains a kind of wild wild west, and the virtual escape of a person is not (yet?) a crime."

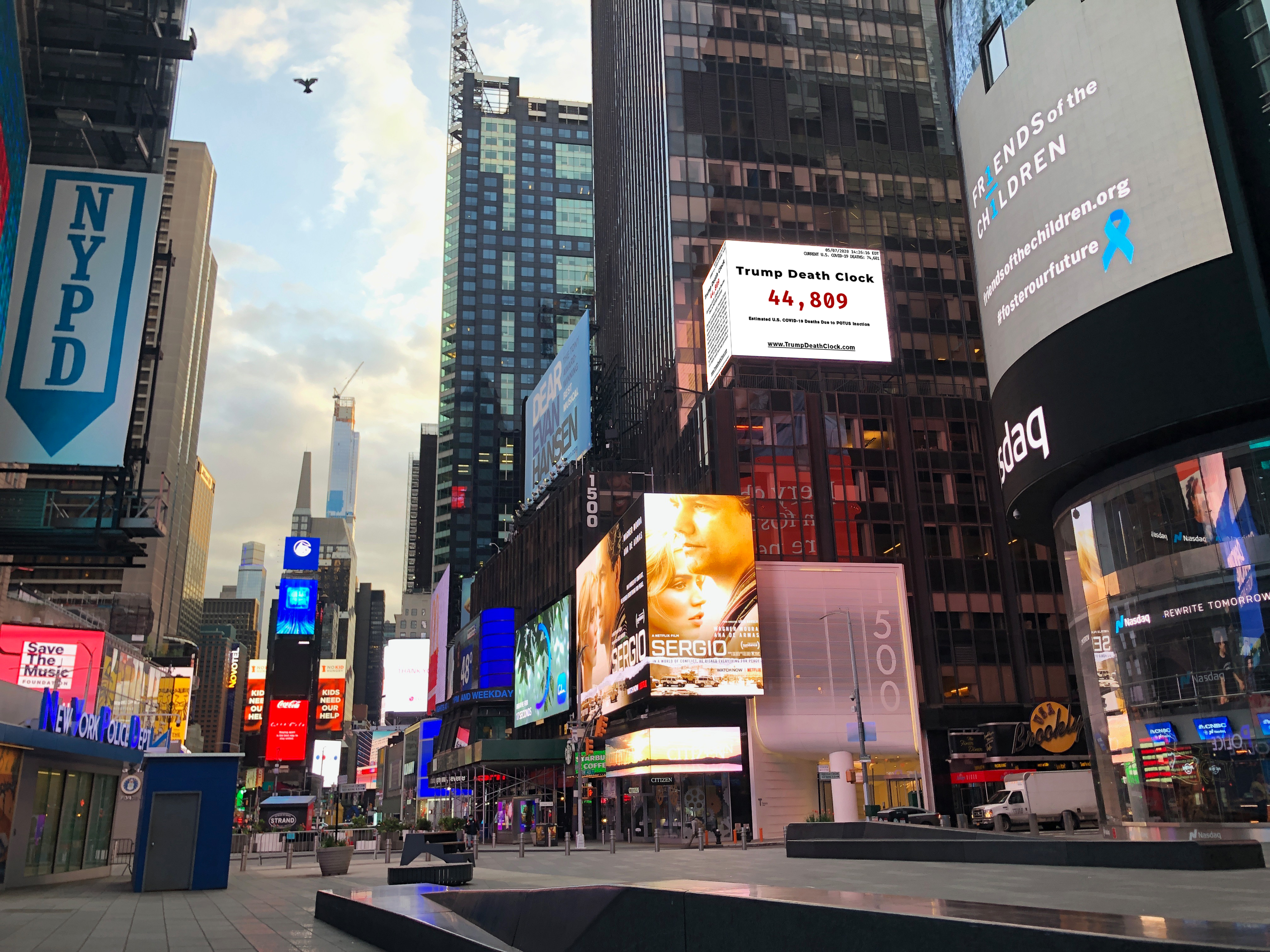
Trump Death Clock in Times Square, New York

As a sequel to this interview, Jarecki publicly interviewed former U.S. Army soldier Chelsea Manning at the 2017 Nantucket Project, after her 35-year prison sentence was commuted by President Obama. In The Guardian, Jarecki wrote, "Manning sees connections in the duty of the soldier who uncovers high crimes, to the death of secrecy in the digital age, to the role of the individual in a society where privacy is as besieged as sexual orientation."

In April 2020, Jarecki created the Trump Death Clock, a 56-foot billboard in Times Square, New York City, that attributed U.S. COVID-19 deaths to Donald Trump and his administration's alleged delayed response to the COVID-19 pandemic.

== Filmography ==
Year	Film	Director	Writer	Producer	Notes	Ref.
1993	Season of the Lifterbees	Yes	Yes	Yes	Documentary short	
2000	Quest of the Carib Canoe	Yes			Documentary feature	
2000	The Opponent	Yes	Yes	Yes	Dramatic feature	
2002	The Trials of Henry Kissinger	Yes		Yes	Documentary feature	
2005	Why We Fight	Yes	Yes	Yes	Documentary feature	
2007	Addiction	Yes			Segment of documentary feature	
2010	Freakonomics	Yes	Yes		Segment of documentary feature	
2010	Move Your Money	Yes	Yes		Documentary short	
2011	Reagan	Yes	Yes	Yes	Documentary feature	
2012	The House I Live In	Yes	Yes	Yes	Documentary feature	
2015	Reclaim Democracy	Yes	Yes	Yes	Documentary short	
2015	(T)ERROR			Yes	Documentary feature	
2015	Don't Blink			Yes	Documentary feature	
2016	The Cyclist (El Ciclista)	Yes	Yes		Documentary short	
2017	The King	Yes	Yes	Yes	Documentary feature	
2025	The Six Billion Dollar Man	Yes		Yes	Documentary feature	

== Awards and nominations ==
Year	Organization	Award	Nominated work	Result
2002	Independent Spirit Award	Truer Than Fiction Award	The Trials of Henry Kissinger	Nominated
2002	Amnesty International	Amnesty International Award	The Trials of Henry Kissinger	Won
2005	Sundance Film Festival	Sundance Grand Jury Prize	Why We Fight	Won
2005	National Association of Broadcasters	Peabody Award	Why We Fight	Won
2005	Writers Guild of America	Best Documentary Screenplay	Why We Fight	Nominated
2011	Emmy Award	Outstanding Historical Programming – Long Form	Reagan	Won
2012	Sundance Film Festival	Sundance Grand Jury Prize	The House I Live In	Won
2012	National Association of Broadcasters	Peabody Award	The House I Live In	Won
2015	Emmy Award	Outstanding Investigative Documentary	(T)ERROR	Won
2020	Emmy Award	Best Documentary	The King	Nominated
2020	Emmy Award	Outstanding Historical Documentary	The King	Nominated
2020	Grammy Award	Best Music Film	The King	Nominated
2025	Cannes Film Festival	L'Œil d'or Jury Prize	The Six Billion Dollar Man	Won
2025	Golden Globe Awards	Golden Globe Prize for Documentary	The Six Billion Dollar Man	Won

== See also ==
- Errol Morris
- Werner Herzog
- Investigative journalism
- Documentary film
- Henry Kissinger
- Elvis Presley

=== Interviews ===
- The Brooklyn Rail: "The Nature of the System/It's the System Not the Man: Eugene Jarecki in conversation with Williams Cole"
- New York Magazine: "Childhood in New York", featuring Jarecki
- a BBC Storyville interview
- a BBC World interview
- on The Daily Show with Jon Stewart
- on The Charlie Rose Show
- on The Colbert Report

=== Full films ===
- Why We Fight – Google Video, 1 hr 39 min 1 sec
- The Trials of Henry Kissinger – Google Video, 1 hr 19 min 41 sec
- Move Your Money short film on YouTube

== Bibliography ==
- The American Way of War: Guided Missiles, Misguided Men, and a Republic in Peril (Simon & Schuster, 2008)
