= Shakaar =

- Star Trek: Deep Space Nine episode
- Episode no.: Season 3 Episode 24
- Directed by: Jonathan West
- Written by: Gordon Dawson
- Production code: 470
- Original air date: May 22, 1995

Guest appearances
- Louise Fletcher as Kai Winn; Duncan Regehr as Shakaar; Diane Salinger as Lupaza; William Lucking as Furel; Sherman Howard as Syvar; John Doman as Lenaris

Episode chronology
← Previous "Family Business"	Next → "Facets"
- Star Trek: Deep Space Nine season 3

"Shakaar" is the 70th episode of the science fiction television series Star Trek: Deep Space Nine, the 24th episode of the third season. It was first broadcast on May 22, 1995.

Set in the 24th century, the series follows the adventures of the crew of the space station Deep Space Nine near the planet Bajor, as the Bajorans recover from a brutal, decades-long occupation by the imperialistic Cardassians. This episode highlights the political development of Bajor and the character development of Bajoran lead character Kira Nerys, who was a resistance fighter during the occupation and now is Deep Space Nine's second-in-command. Guest star Duncan Regehr plays Bajoran farmer-turned-politician Shakaar.

Nielsen ratings for "Shakaar" registered 7.1 points with a rank of 4.

== Plot ==
When the First Minister of the Bajoran Provisional Government dies, conniving religious leader Kai Winn is appointed to his position on an interim basis and is likely to be formally elected to the office. Later, Winn approaches Major Kira with a request. A group of farmers refuse to return some soil reclamators that Winn has promised to Rakantha Province. Their leader, Shakaar, also led Kira's resistance cell during the Occupation, so Winn wants Kira to convince him to return the equipment. Kira is reluctant to confront her friend and mentor, but accepts the task.

Shakaar tells Kira he and his fellow farmers (also former members of his resistance cell) were promised use of the reclamators for a year, but when Winn took over, they were ordered to return them immediately. Since the Rakantha project is geared toward farming products for export, while Shakaar's farmers are trying to feed their people, he sees his project as far more important. Kira encourages him to meet with Winn and compromise. Instead of attending the meeting, Winn sends security officers to arrest Shakaar. Kira and Shakaar subdue the officers and escape.

Now fugitives, Shakaar, Kira, and their comrades hide in the mountains where they once eluded the Cardassians. Displays of civil disobedience in support of Shakaar occur across Bajor; Winn petitions Starfleet to help apprehend Shakaar but Commander Sisko refuses, citing the Prime Directive. Weeks later, as the militia closes in, Shakaar's exhausted group realizes there is no option but to stop running and fight. They lead their pursuers into a canyon to set up an ambush.

Hiding in the canyon, Shakaar and Kira watch as the Bajoran troops enter their trap. But as they see the faces of their "enemies", they realize that they will be shooting former comrades. Unwilling to do this, Kira and Shakaar drop their weapons and, after a brief conversation with the militia's commander, Colonel Lenaris, a ceasefire is called. Lenaris escorts Shakaar and Kira to Winn's office, where Shakaar informs Winn that he has decided to enter the election for First Minister. Realizing a competitive election against the popular Shakaar will expose how her actions brought Bajor to the brink of civil war, Winn steps down from the race, leaving Shakaar certain to win.

In a side plot back on Deep Space Nine, Chief O'Brien records an incredible winning streak at darts; his streak ends when he leans backwards for a drink and severely injures his shoulder during a match.

== Reception ==
Zack Handlen of The A.V. Club was pleased to see a good Kira episode, he sees it as a welcome throwback to earlier seasons and remains fascinated by post-occupation Bajoran politics. His only criticism was of the pacing and that the conflict was too easily resolved.

In 2018, SyFy recommend this episode for its abbreviated watch guide focusing on Kira.

== Releases ==
This episode was released on VHS video tape paired with "Family Business" by Paramount Home Video.

This episode was released on October 2, 1998 in Japan as part of the half-season LaserDisc box set 3rd Season vol.2. The format included both English and Japanese audio tracks, as well as Japanese captions.

The episode was released on June 3, 2003 in North America as part of the season 3 DVD box set.
