= John Doman =

American actor

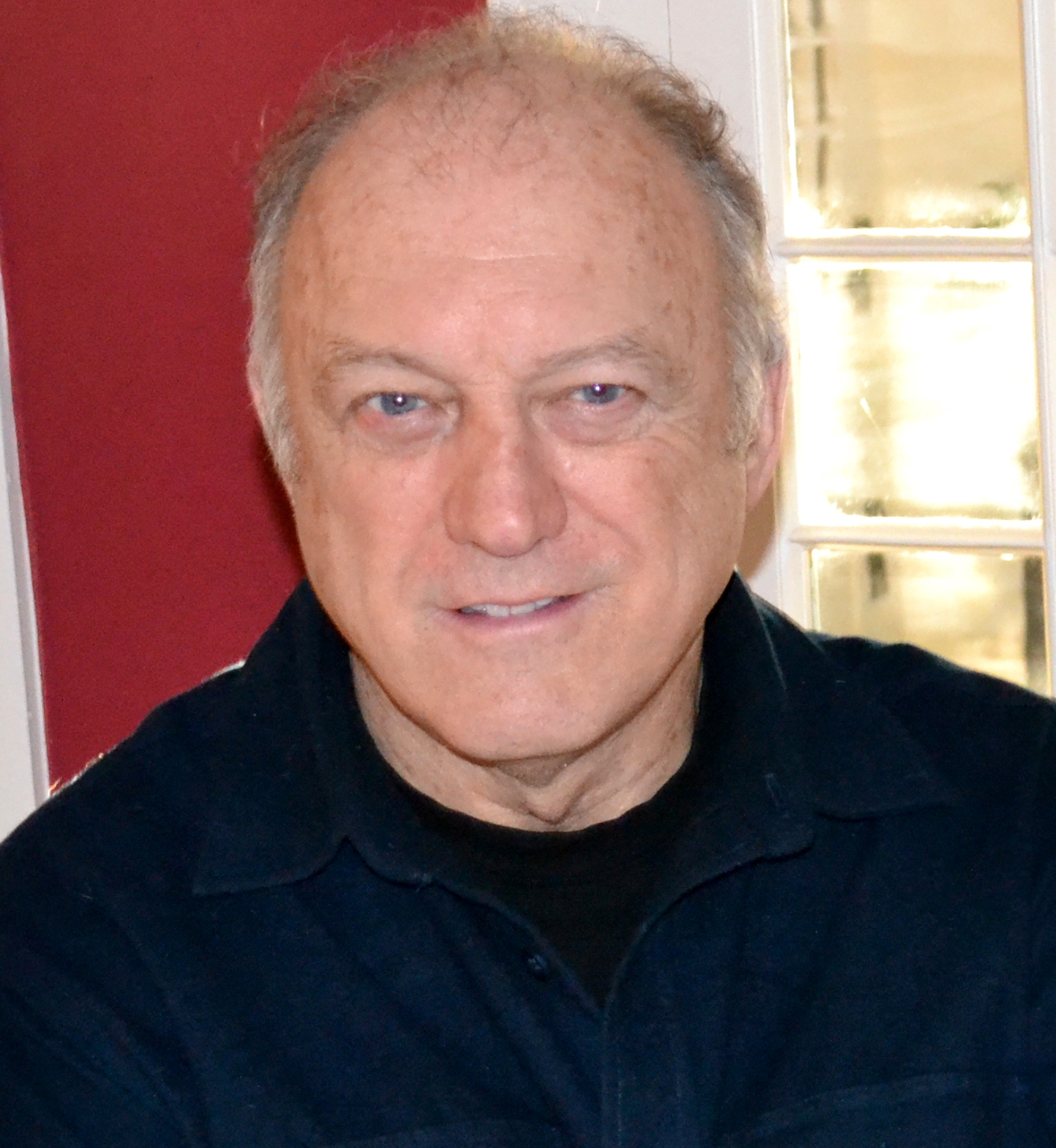
- Doman in 2013
- Born: January 9, 1945 (age 81); Philadelphia, Pennsylvania, U.S.
- Education: University of Pennsylvania (BA); Pennsylvania State University (MBA)
- Occupation: Actor
- Years active: 1991–present
- Spouses: Linda Lee Rudloff (m. 1981; died 2014) Elizabeth Donnelly (m. 2019)
- Children: 1

John Doman is an American actor best known for playing Bill Rawls on HBO series The Wire (2002–2008), Colonel Edward Galson on Oz (2001), Dr. Deraad in ER (1999–2003), Rodrigo Borgia in the international television series Borgia (2011–2014), Don Carmine Falcone in Fox's show Gotham (2014–2017), and Bruce Buttler in The Affair (2014–2019).

== Early life and education ==
Doman was born in Philadelphia, Pennsylvania, and is an alumnus of Northeast Catholic High School. Doman graduated from North in 1962 where he was an All-Catholic League football player and member of the school's Hall of Fame. He received a Bachelor of Arts (BA) degree in English Literature from the University of Pennsylvania in 1966. During his years at UPenn, he was a three-year letterman and starting defensive back with the Quakers football team from 1963 to 1965. He also earned a Master of Business Administration (MBA) degree in Marketing from the Smeal College of Business of Pennsylvania State University in 1972.

In between his time at Penn and Penn State, Doman served with the United States Marine Corps, beginning with his enrollment in its Officer Candidates School at Quantico, Virginia. He was commissioned a Second Lieutenant in March 1967 and served with the 3rd Marine Division in the Vietnam War.

Following graduation, he spent nearly two decades in the advertising business, starting with a role at SSC&B Advertising and Norman Craig & Kummel. He was one of the first six employees at TBWA New York when it debuted in 1977. Doman concluded his 14 year career with TBWA as Executive Vice President, Head of Business Development, responsible for a new-business program which resulted in Agency of the Year honors from Adweek in 1990. Doman pivoted his career from an advertising executive to a full-time actor when he was cast in a commercial for AT&T in 1991.

== Acting career ==
Doman has made minor appearances in Cop Land and Mystic River. He had minor roles in The Opponent, Die Hard with a Vengeance and Blue Valentine. In 2004, he appeared in the third installment of action-film series Sniper. His TV appearances include: guest-star in the Star Trek: Deep Space Nine episode "Shakaar", Dr. Carl Deraad in seasons 5 and 6 of ER, and bad-guy CEO Walter Kendrick on season 2 of Damages. He provided the voice of Don Morello in the videogame Mafia: City of Lost Heaven; Caesar in the videogame Fallout New Vegas; commercials for Michelin tires and Home Depot. In 2013 he began narrating videos for the Philadelphia Eagles.

During his career, Doman has portrayed several different characters in numerous episodes of Law & Order and Law & Order: Special Victims Unit. He also guest-starred in Law & Order: Trial by Jury, and Law & Order: Criminal Intent. In total, he has played 11 different characters in the Law & Order franchise.

From 2010 to 2011, Doman appeared in three episodes of Rizzoli & Isles as a mob enforcer. This reunited him with Sasha Alexander, who he had previously worked within the NCIS season 2 episode "Doppelganger", where Doman played Lt. Cheney, the head of local civilian law enforcement. He played Rodrigo Borgia in the Borgia series in 2011 and starred in director Pieter Gaspersz's AFTER opposite Kathleen Quinlan.

Other roles he has had include: Senator Ross Garrison in Person of Interest; Helen's (Maura Tierney) father in the Showtime drama The Affair; Bishop Charles Eddis in House of Cards, and the U.S. Ambassador to Germany in season 2 of Berlin Station. He has worked on the stage in New York and in major regional theaters around the country in plays by playwrights ranging from Sam Shepard to Shakespeare, including Stephen Adly Guirgis' Our Lady of 121st Street at the Signature Theater in New York City. Doman has also appeared in promotional advertisements for Versus Television.

== Filmography ==
=== Film ===
Year	Title	Role	Notes
1995	Ultimate Taboo	—N/a	
1995	Die Hard with a Vengeance	Foreman	
1995	Stonewall	Plainclothes Cop	
1995	The Journey of August King	Bolton	
1996	Beavis and Butt-Head Do America	Airplane Captain, White House Representative	Voice
1997	Little Boy Blue	Andy Berg	
1997	Cop Land	Lassaro's Aide	
1997	Fool's Paradise	U.S. Senator	
1998	Mercury Rising	Supervisor Hartley	
1998	Claire Dolan	Cain's friend	
1999	Giving It Up	Ralph Gigante, Sr.	
1999	Loving Jezebel	Pop Melville	
1999	Wirey Spindell	Wirey's father	
1999	Puppet	Russian Godfather	
2000	Interstate 84	Montaldo	
2000	The Opponent	Fred	
2001	Besotted	Cap'n Dave	
2002	Emmett's Mark	Capt. Berman	
2002	City by the Sea	Henderson	
2003	Mystic River	Driver	
2004	The Kings of Brooklyn	Dad	
2004	Sniper 3	Paul Finnegan	
2004	Noel	Dr. Baron	
2005	Rock the Paint	Father Pete	
2005	Dawn's Early Light	Sheriff Clayton	Short film
2006	Fatwa	John Davidson	
2006	Lonely Hearts	Chief MacSwain	
2007	Gracie	Coach Colasanti	
2008	Sympathetic Details	Phillips	
2010	The Company Men	Dysert	
2010	Blue Valentine	Jerry Heller	
2014	After	Mitch Valentino	
2016	Ordinary World	Walt	
2017	You Were Never Really Here	John McCleary	
2017	Two Black Coffees	Bartender	Short film
2019	Cold Pursuit	Gip	
2019	Almost Love	Tommy	
2020	The Trial of the Chicago 7	John N. Mitchell	
2021	The Case	Charles O'Hara	

=== Television ===
Year	Title	Role	Notes
1991–2008	Law & Order	Various	5 episodes
1992	As the World Turns	Julius Harper	Episode: "Thu Jan 2 1992"
1992	Loving	Dobson	6 episodes
1993	Empty Cradle	Mr. Lee	Television movie
1994	All My Children	Burt Marston	Episode #1.6419
1994	Directed By	Ira	Episode: "Leslie's Folly"
1995	Star Trek: Deep Space Nine	Lenaris Holem	Episode: "Shakaar"
1995	New York News		Episode: "Cost of Living"
1995	Dr. Quinn, Medicine Woman	Mr. Riggs	Episode: "Hell on Wheels"
1995	Donor Unknown	Dr. Bochman	Television movie
1996	The City	Murray Golden	10 episodes
1997	Guiding Light	Jack Blue	2 episodes
1997	New York Undercover	Richard Croates	Episode: "Is It a Crime?"
1999	NYPD Blue	Frank DiNovi	Episode: "Don't Meth with Me"
1999–2003	ER	Dr. Carl Deraad	10 episodes
2000	Martial Law	Governor Marx	Episode: "Heartless"
2000	The Sopranos	District Attorney (uncredited)	Episode: "Full Leather Jacket"
2000–2001	The Practice	Officer Michael Finlay / Testifying Detective / Detective Michael Finley	3 episodes
2000–2012	Law & Order: Special Victims Unit	Various	5 episodes
2001	100 Centre Street		Episode: "Hostage"
2001	Oz	Edward Galson	4 episodes
2001	The Practice	Detective	Episode: "What Child Is This?"
2001	Judging Amy	Ralph	Episode: "Hold on Tight"
2001	Law & Order: Criminal Intent	Roy Markham	Episode: "The Extra Man"
2001	A Glimpse of Hell	Admiral Langlett	Television movie
2001	Three Blind Mice	Stephen Leeds	Television movie
2002–2008	The Wire	William A. Rawls	47 episodes
2003	Queens Supreme		Episode: "One Angry Man"
2003	CSI: Crime Scene Investigation	Judge Slater	2 episodes
2003	Hack	Hanratty	Episode: "Dial 'O' for Murder"
2005	NCIS	Lt. Cheney	Episode: "Doppelgänger"
2005	Law & Order: Trial by Jury	Tim Grace	Episode: "Blue Wall"
2006	Close to Home	Eugene Kale	Episode: "Deacon"
2007	Without a Trace	Hayden Mills	Episode: "Deep Water"
2009	Damages	Walter Kendrick	10 episodes
2010	Burn Notice	Bill Cowley	2 episodes
2010–2014	Rizzoli & Isles	Patrick "Paddy" Doyle	7 episodes
2011	The Good Wife	Oliver Cardiff	Episode: "The Death Zone"
2011–2014	Borgia	Rodrigo Borgia	36 episodes
2012	A Gifted Man	Coach	Episode: "In Case of Blind Spots"
2012	NYC 22	Detective Collins	Episode: "Playing God"
2014	Unforgettable	Vincent Quinn	Episode: "Stray Bullet"
2014–2016	Person of Interest	Senator Ross Garrison	10 episodes
2014–2017	Gotham	Carmine Falcone	Main role (season 1), Recurring role (seasons 2–4); 31 episodes
2014–2019	The Affair	Bruce Butler	14 episodes
2015	House of Cards	Bishop Charles Eddis	2 episodes
2016	Madam Secretary	CIA Director Dennis Ellerman	2 episodes
2016	Feed the Beast	Aidan Moran	10 episodes
2017	Elementary	Councilman Slessinger	Episode: "The Ballad of Lady Frances"
2017	Berlin Station	Ambassador Richard Hanes	9 episodes
2017	Longmire	Victor Moretti	Episode: "Running Eagle Challenge"
2017	Wormwood	Detective	Episode: "Chapter 4: Opening the Lid"
2017	Final Vision	Bernie Segal	Television movie
2018	Erase	John O'Neal	Television movie
2018–2019	Instinct	Roger Reinhart	2 episodes
2019–2020	The Boys	Dr. Jonah Vogelbaum	3 episodes
2020–2021	For Life	Attorney General Burke	8 episodes
2021–2022	Birdgirl	Dog with Bucket Hat (voice)	12 episodes
2021–2022	City on a Hill	Guy Dan	15 episodes
2022	Law & Order: Organized Crime	Robert Silas	4 episodes
2024	The Big Cigar	Abe Schneider	Miniseries
2024	Eric	Robert Anderson	5 episodes
2025	Long Bright River	Gee	8 episodes
2026	Elsbeth	Richard Perrick	season 4 episode 2 "Death of a Playwright"

=== Video games ===
Year	Title	Role
2002	Mafia	Morello
2003	Midnight Club II	Diego
2003	Manhunt	Hoods
2008	Need for Speed: Undercover	FBI #1
2010	Fallout: New Vegas	Caesar
