= The Outsider (2005 film) =

- Directed by: Nicholas Jarecki
- Produced by: Nicholas Jarecki
- Starring: James Toback, Robert Downey Jr., Roger Ebert, Jim Brown, Woody Allen, Neve Campbell, Norman Mailer, Barry Levinson
- Edited by: Nicholas Jarecki
- Distributed by: Westlake Entertainment.
- Release date: April 22, 2005 (Tribeca Film Festival)
- Running time: 83 minutes
- Country: United States
- Language: English

The Outsider is a 2005 American documentary film directed by Nicholas Jarecki. In his 2001 book Breaking In: How 20 Film Directors Got Their Start, Jarecki had interviewed director and screenwriter James Toback. In The Outsider, Jarecki's first feature-length film, Jarecki tracks Toback through the shooting, editing, and marketing of Toback's 2004 film When Will I Be Loved.

== Content ==
Subtitled "a film about James Toback", The Outsider alternates among on-location shots, interviews with Toback and with many of his film collaborators and celebrity friends, and commentary by film critic Roger Ebert. Jarecki follows Toback into the editing room after the initial shooting of When Will I Be Loved. For this film, Toback says he "shot freely", so that "all sorts of options are now open". Toback describes film editing as a creative process on a par with acting or writing. "Editing is the making of the movie." Screenwriter and director Robert Towne accepts Toback's invitation to a screening of the first production cut of When Will I Be Loved. Accepting Towne's critique that a principal character in the film lacks adequate introduction, Toback then orders a re-shoot, adding two scenes to the final cut he shops to distributors.

In a "Bonus Features" audio track bundled into the DVD release of The Outsider, Jarecki says, "I used the framework of [Toback] making the movie as the spine to jump off of, cutting with the interviews. ... I wanted to get into Toback as a personal filmmaker...." For helping to resolve his footage and clips into a finished documentary, Jarecki credits editors Chris Franklin and Karen Schmeer.

== Reception ==
Based on 17 reviews, Rotten Tomatoes has scored The Outsider at 65%. Metacritic has rated it "generally favorable", with a score of 64.

Mick LaSalle of San Francisco Chronicle praised it as "shrewdly made" and The Village Voice called it "among the great" documentaries about filmmaking. The New York Times reviewer, intrigued by Toback as "a true independent" and "one of the more unusual cinematic talents working today", found in The Outsider "only frustrating glimpses of [Toback's] directing style...." Jarecki does capture in his footage Toback's reliance on and praise for Steadicam, which, according to Toback, revolutionized filmmaking more than any other technical device introduced in the last half century. In The Outsider, Toback tells Jarecki's camera, "The uniting of style and substance in making a movie is possible for me only because of the Steadicam. It enables me to shoot aesthetically in the way I want to shoot and shoot actors in a way that makes them feel as if they are not being shot."
