= Tyson (2008 film) =

2008 documentary film about former heavyweight world champion boxer Mike Tyson

- Promotional film poster
- Directed by: James Toback
- Written by: James Toback
- Produced by: Carmelo Anthony; Damon Bingham; James Toback; Mike Tyson; Harlan Werner; Nicholas Jarecki; Henry Jarecki
- Starring: Mike Tyson
- Edited by: Aaron Yanes
- Production company: Wild Bunch
- Distributed by: Sony Pictures Classics
- Release dates: September 14, 2008 (Filmfest Oldenburg); April 24, 2009 (United States)
- Running time: 90 minutes
- Country: United States
- Language: English
- Box office: $942,049

Tyson is a 2008 documentary film about the life of former undisputed heavyweight world champion boxer Mike Tyson. It was directed by American filmmaker James Toback and produced by Nicholas Jarecki, Bob Yari, and NBA player Carmelo Anthony.

The film was publicly screened for the first time at the 2008 Cannes Film Festival and won the Regard Knockout Award at the Un Certain Regard event. Tyson was released in a limited on April 24, 2009, then it expanded wide on May 15, 2009, distributed by Sony Pictures Classics.

== Synopsis ==
The documentary is a self-discovery of a Mike Tyson, who reflects on his highly controversial public life. It begins with clips of 20-year-old Tyson's convincing World Boxing Council Heavyweight Championship win over Trevor Berbick, then explores the fighter's upbringing and motivation. It is revealed that he had a dysfunctional family life and difficult childhood in Brownsville, Brooklyn, where his crimes led him to Tryon School for Boys in Johnstown, New York. A father-son relationship with his first professional trainer, Cus D'Amato, is expressed as Tyson chokes back tears. He reveals his fear that he felt when D'Amato died in 1985. Tyson was 19 years old when he lost the one and only father figure in his life.

Tyson eventually unified the WBC, WBA and IBF title championship belts, becoming the undisputed heavyweight champion. This event was the root cause of Tyson's personal issues. Tyson notes that his great stardom at the age of 20 was both a blessing and a curse. From his great achievements at such a young age to the eventual tangled web of his existence, Tyson explains his flaws of mental instability, immaturity, lust for women and fear, all of which culminated into his downfall as a professional boxer. Now having fought and overcome his fears in order to earn his respect, Tyson is shocked by the outcome: a renewed respect for life and family.

== Reception ==
The film received high critical praise, scoring an 85% approval rating on the website Rotten Tomatoes from 138 film critics. It has a score of 83% on Metacritic.

A.O. Scott wrote in the New York Times: "Because it restricts itself to Mr. Tyson’s point of view, [it] offers a rare and vivid study in the complexity of a single suffering, raging soul. It is not an entirely trustworthy movie, but it does feel profoundly honest."
