= Henry Jarecki =

German-born American psychiatrist, entrepreneur, and philanthropist

- Born: Henry George Jarecki; April 15, 1933 (age 93); Stettin, Nazi Germany (now Szczecin, Poland)
- Education: Heidelberg University (MD 1957)
- Occupations: Academic, psychiatrist, entrepreneur, philanthropist
- Spouse: Gloria Jarecki
- Children: 4, including Andrew Jarecki, Eugene Jarecki, and Nicholas Jarecki

Henry George Jarecki (born April 15, 1933) is a German-born American academic, psychiatrist, entrepreneur, producer, and philanthropist.

== Early life ==
Henry Jarecki was born into a German-Jewish family in Stettin (now Szczecin in northwestern Poland), the son of Max Jarecki, a physician, and Gerda Kunstmann, the scion of a shipping family. As a child, he fled Nazi Germany with his family for the United Kingdom and subsequently the United States.

== Academic career ==
Jarecki graduated from the Medical Faculty at Heidelberg University in 1957, and subsequently spent more than a decade as an academic, teaching at the Yale Medical School, and as a psychiatrist in private practice in New Haven, Connecticut, and at the Yale New Haven Hospital. Jarecki remains an adjunct professor at Yale. With Dr. Thomas Detre, Jarecki was the author of Modern Psychiatric Treatment, a 733-page study of psychopharmacologic and other therapies published in 1971. As an academic, he was author or co-author of a number of articles in the psychiatric field, about psychopharmacology, psychiatric units in general hospitals, combined amitriptyline/phenelzine poisoning, and drug addiction.

=== Selected publications ===
- Thomas P. Detre and Henry G. Jarecki, Modern psychiatric treatment. Philadelphia and Toronto 1971
- H. Jarecki, "Should Drugs be Legalized?", in: Yale Psychiatric Quart., Vol 12. July 1989
- Henry G. Jarecki, Daniela Zane Kaisth, Scholar rescue in the modern world. (Institute of International Education) New York 2009
- An Alchemist's Way: How to Make Luck Look Like Skill., 2021, ISBN 978-057-8976-402

== Business career ==
=== Mocatta Group ===
In 1967, Jarecki became involved with the London bullion house, Mocatta & Goldsmid, Ltd. In 1969, he established the American counterpart to Mocatta & Goldsmid, known as Mocatta Metals Corporation. In partnership initially with Hambros Bank and subsequently with Standard Chartered Bank, Jarecki managed the Mocatta Group until he sold his shares in the late 1980s. Jarecki's activity in the bullion market was as a dealer in precious metals and in options. During this period, Mocatta became a counterparty to the Hunt Brothers during their attempted silver corner of 1980, with Jarecki playing an active role in managing the firm's exposure. Mocatta & Goldsmid had previously been involved with stabilization of the markets under similar circumstances, such as the 1913 rescue of the Indian Specie Bank.

During his involvement with the Mocatta Group, Jarecki served as a director of the Futures Industry Association, the National Futures Association, COMEX, the Chicago Board of Trade, and the Chicago Metals board of trade, and was an adviser to the Commodity Futures Trading Commission in the years following its establishment. Jarecki was also the founder of a number of other business ventures, notably Brody, White & Co., a brokerage firm that is now a part of Newedge Group.

Jarecki pioneered the use of computers to trade the commodities markets and Mocatta was among the first firms to offer over-the-counter and exchange-traded options on futures in the American commodity markets when the options were introduced in the early 1980s.

=== Later ventures ===
After leaving Mocatta, Jarecki was the Chairman and lead investor in the movie information and ticketing company Moviefone, which was co-founded by his son, Andrew Jarecki, and sold to AOL in 1999. More recently, he has helped the City of Heidelberg, Germany to develop a campus in Bahnstadt for young research-based companies, and has established PsychoGenics, a psycho- and neuro-pharmaceutical contract research and drug discovery company in Paramus, New Jersey.

== Philanthropic work ==
With Daniela Kaisth, he has written a book entitled Scholar Rescue in the Modern World. Jarecki is a leading advocate in Germany and the United States for refugees, calling for an alternative narrative on refugees, and stating, "Giess Wasser zur Suppe und heiss alle willkommen," ("Add water to the soup and make everyone welcome"). In partnership with the Government of the state of Baden-Wurttemberg and private foundations, Jarecki has led an effort to provide endangered scholars with sanctuary and the opportunity to re-build their careers at universities in Germany. His work in this field has been recorded in the United States' Congressional Record.

In 2004, he co-founded the Gloria and Henry Jarecki School in Ratanakiri, Cambodia. Previously, he served as a trustee of the American Museum of Natural History, the Classical Theatre of Harlem, and the Harlem School of the Arts.

Jarecki has been a member of the Advisory Council at the Department of German at Princeton University and of the Department of Psychiatry at the Yale University School of Medicine. He presently serves as a Governor of H. Lavity Stoutt Community College in Tortola, British Virgin Islands, as a trustee of the Island Resources Foundation, and founded the British Virgin Islands' first youth center, the Youth Empowerment Project, in Tortola.

Jarecki and his family have been donors to his alma mater, the University of Heidelberg, and to the City of Heidelberg, refurbishing the university's Anatomy Department, and donating a playground to Heidelberg's Emmertsgrund, a district in which many refugee and immigrant families reside. Dr. Jarecki has been a member of the Heidelberg University Association's Advisory Board in New York since 2013.

== Arts and theatre ==
Jarecki has also been a motion pictures and theater producer, with credits including Gardeners of Eden (2004), Cuba: Island of Music (2005), Ain't Supposed to Die a Natural Death (2007), The Third Wave (2008), Tyson (2009), Cat on a Hot Tin Roof (2009), and A Streetcar Named Desire (2012). Jarecki also makes an appearance as himself in the Melvin Van Peebles biopic, How to Eat Your Watermelon in White Company (and Enjoy It) (2005).

== Personal life ==
Jarecki is the husband of Gloria Jarecki, formerly a film critic at Time magazine. Together, they were nominated for the Travel Industry of America's Hall of Leaders for their environmental work in ecotourism on Guana Island. He is the father of four sons; the finance executive Thomas A. Jarecki, and the filmmakers Andrew Jarecki, Eugene Jarecki and Nicholas Jarecki. He is the brother of Dr. Richard W. Jarecki, also a physician and formerly on the faculty of the University of Heidelberg, who is noted for the development of statistical analysis of gambling facilities.

Jarecki has a home in Rye, New York and is also a part-time resident of the British Virgin Islands, where he owns two private islands: Guana Island and Norman Island. Jarecki holds BVI Belonger status.

In 1978, Jarecki sought to buy the former Stuyvesant Fish mansion at 19 Gramercy Park South in Manhattan, New York City, but was outbid. When the property – which has more than 37 rooms on six floors for over 18,000 square feet (1,700 m²) of living space – became available again in 2000, he was able to purchase it, with plans to use it as both a home and the headquarters of the family foundation, the Timber Falls Foundation.

== Recognition ==
In 1992, a species of lizard, Jarecki's flying dragon (Draco jareckii), was named in honor of Henry Jarecki.

In 2005, the Futures Industry Association launched a "Hall of Fame" to celebrate its fiftieth anniversary and to honor "the accomplishments and recognize the significant contributions individuals have made to the futures and options industry." For his contribution to the industry, Jarecki was one of the initial 55 honorees, among whom were also economist Alan Greenspan, Senator Robert Dole and U.S. futures pioneer Leo Melamed.

On 22 May 2010, Bard College awarded Jarecki a Doctorate of Humane Letters degree, calling him, "one of the most respected voices in the US investment community today."

In 2011, the City of Heidelberg announced that its Güteramtsstraße would be renamed Max-Jarecki-Straße in honor of Dr. Jarecki's late father. In 2014, Dr. Jarecki was chosen to be an Honorary Senator of the University of Heidelberg.

In November 2016, Dr. Jarecki was awarded the Order of Merit, Officer's Cross by the president of Germany for his work to improve the city of Heidelberg, enhance U.S.-German relations, and encourage Germany to open its universities to host threatened scholars from around the world.

== Legal matters ==
On June 3, 2024, a woman who says she was a victim of sex abuser Jeffrey Epstein filed a lawsuit against Jarecki accusing him of rape and sex trafficking, after Epstein allegedly sent her to Jarecki for psychiatric treatment in 2011. The same woman voluntarily dismissed her civil lawsuit in April 2025.

A note from Jarecki was also included in Jeffrey Epstein's birthday book.
