= Draco jareckii =

Conservation status
- Least Concern (IUCN 3.1)

Scientific classification
- Kingdom: Animalia
- Phylum: Chordata
- Class: Reptilia
- Order: Squamata
- Suborder: Iguania
- Family: Agamidae
- Genus: Draco
- Species: D. jareckii

Binomial name
- Draco jareckii Lazell, 1992
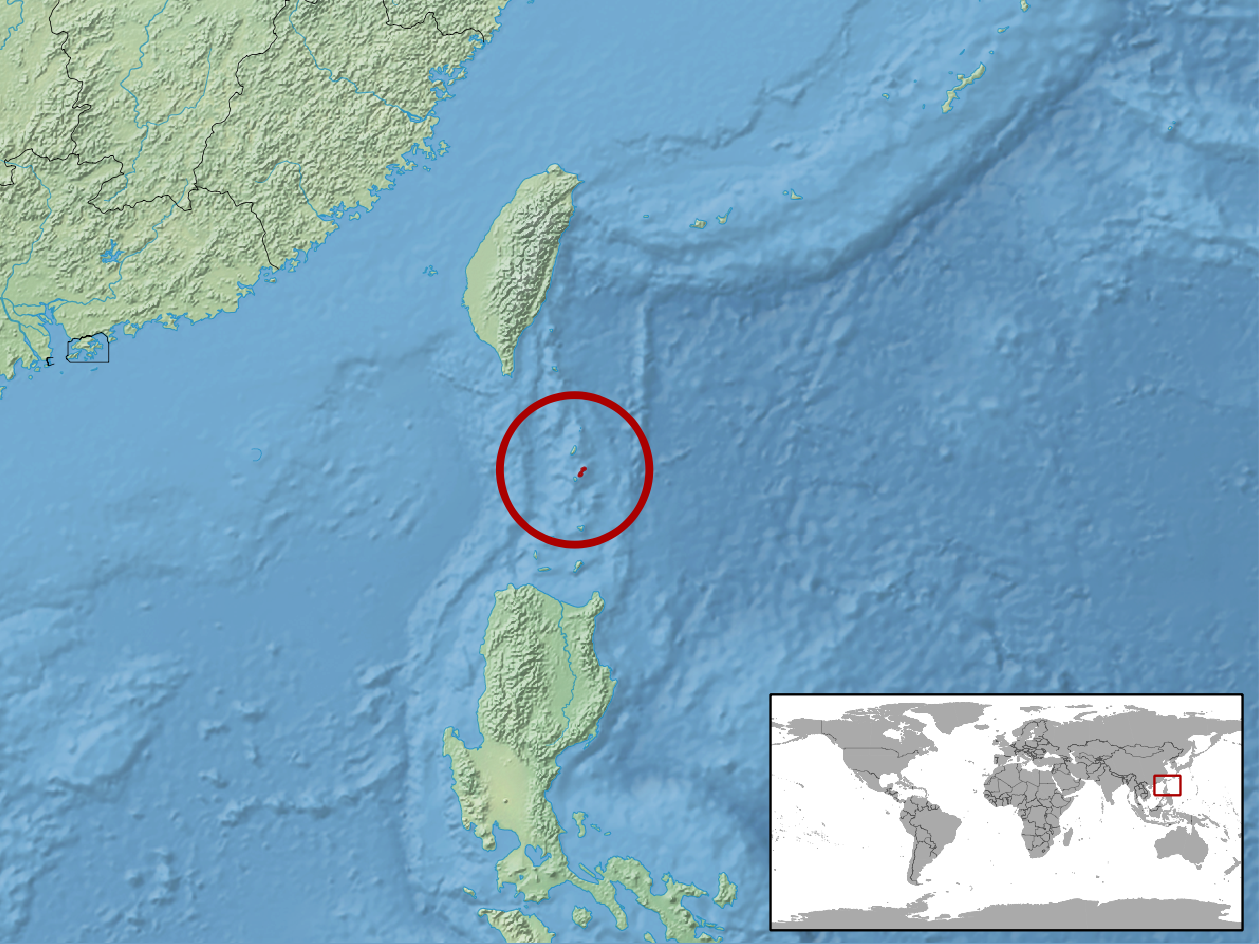

Species of lizard

Draco jareckii is a species of "flying" lizard in the family Agamidae. The species is endemic to the Philippines. Like all members of the genus Draco, males possess a dewlap for displaying, and both sexes possess pseudo-wings (patagia) for gliding from high places, though not actually capable of powered flight.

== Etymology ==
The specific name, jareckii, is in honor of American psychiatrist Henry G. Jarecki.

== Geographic range ==
D. jareckii is found on Batan Island in the Philippines.

== Habitat ==
The preferred natural habitat of D. jareckii is forest, at altitudes from sea level to 900 m (3,000 ft), but it has also been found in rural gardens.

== Behavior ==
D. jareckii is arboreal, and is usually found on tree trunks at heights of 1.5–6 m (4.9–19.7 ft) above the ground.

== Reproduction ==
D. jareckii is oviparous.

== Conservation status ==
D. jareckii is identified as not in need of specialized conservation actions and labeled of "Least Concern" by the IUCN.
