= EmiSunshine =

American singer-songwriter

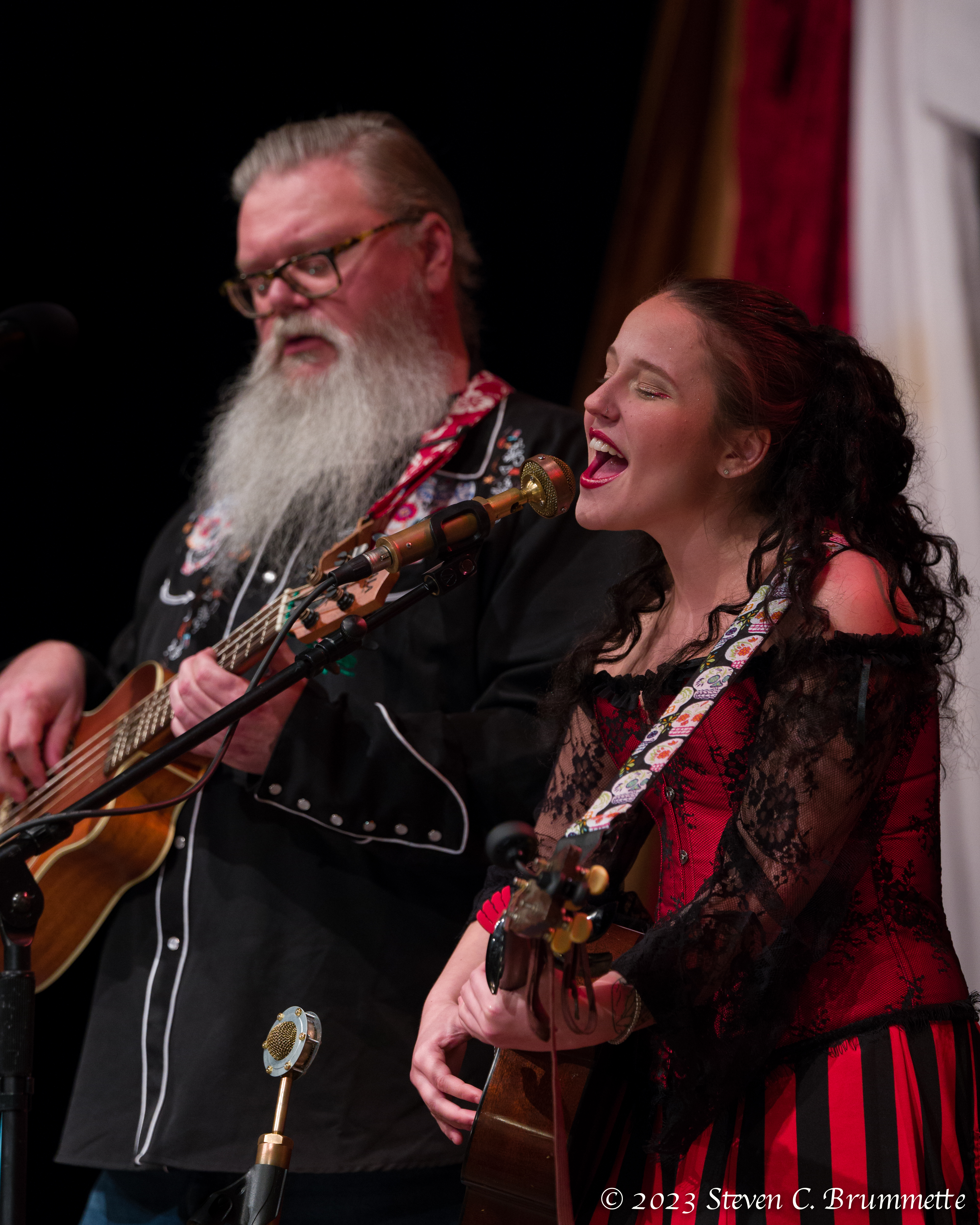
- EmiSunshine in 2023

Background information
- Born: Emilie Sunshine Hamilton; June 8, 2004 (age 21); Madisonville, Tennessee, United States
- Genres: Country, folk, indie, blues, rock
- Occupation: Singer-songwriter
- Instrument(s): Vocals, guitar, ukulele
- Years active: 2013–present
- Website: theemisunshine.com

Emilie Sunshine Hamilton (born June 8, 2004), known professionally as EmiSunshine, is an American singer-songwriter from Madisonville, Tennessee, and a social media personality. Her performance of Jimmie Rodgers' "Blue Yodel No. 6" was posted on YouTube in 2014 and received over 1 million views and attention from the Today show (NBC) and Music Row. Her YouTube series, Americana Corner, featured Holly Williams for its debut episode and earned a feature story in Rolling Stone's country section.

EmiSunshine's music is generally described as country, but also exhibits Americana, bluegrass, blues and gospel influences. She has described her style as "old-time music turned upside-down." She is known for writing and performing songs about mature subjects not ordinarily associated with artists her age, including murder, poverty, politics, autism and family dysfunction. In 2017, Rolling Stone named her among "10 new country artists you need to know."

== Early life ==
EmiSunshine was born on June 8, 2004, in Madisonville, Tennessee, to Randall Hamilton, a musician and recording engineer, and Alisha Karol Hamilton, a songwriter and nurse. Randall and Alisha have said that, even as a baby, EmiSunshine exhibited a remarkable musical ability, humming along to songs with perfect pitch. "I noticed it at nine months," Randall told the Chicago Tribune. "There was a pure tone in the key of C coming out of her. I thought, 'This baby is something. She may be able to sing when she is older.'" By the age of three, she was singing with her grandmothers. Her first performance in front of an audience occurred at age four, when she performed "You Are My Sunshine" at the wedding of her aunt and uncle.

EmiSunshine began singing in churches and festivals throughout East Tennessee. At the age of seven she simultaneously recorded her first two albums, Strong as the Tall Pine and Wide River to Cross in her father's studio with help from her father and her grandfather, "PaPaw Bill".

== Career ==
=== 2013–2015: Breakthrough ===
When EmiSunshine was nine years old, a fan in her hometown posted a video on YouTube of her singing the Jimmie Rodgers and Louis Armstrong song "Blue Yodel No. 6" at a flea market. The video went viral, attracting millions of views. As a result, she was invited to perform on NBC's Today show. Video of her televised performance attracted even more attention on the Internet and among country music professionals in Nashville.

Soon, she was writing songs and appearing on stage with established artists. In 2014, she made her debut performance at the Grand Ole Opry. She released her first single, "Oh Mary, Where Is Your Baby?" in 2014 and a year later released her next single, "I Am Able." She released the full-length album Black Sunday '35 when she was nine years old. Also during this time, she opened for Willie Nelson in Southern California and Las Vegas, Tanya Tucker and Loretta Lynn in Branson.

=== 2016–present: Continued success ===
In 2016, at age 12, EmiSunshine appeared in The King, a documentary film about Elvis Presley, which featured celebrities such as Emmylou Harris, Rosanne Cash, Alec Baldwin, Ashton Kutcher and others. In the movie, she sang two songs she had previously written, “Danny Ray" and "Johnny June and Jesus," which she performed while riding in the backseat of Elvis Presley's 1963 Rolls-Royce Silver Cloud. She later performed at the film's international premiere at the 2017 Cannes Film Festival. The soundtrack was nominated for a Grammy award.

She released her fourth studio album, Ragged Dreams, in 2017, which included her two songs from The King. She also attracted attention for another song on that album, "90 Miles", which was about autism. "I have a really good friend who has autism, and he was treated really differently because of it and it really bothered me," she told the South Bend Tribune. "I met him and I didn't know that he had autism. The kids would tell me not to talk to him, even adults... I want this song to be something that just kind of shows people that, hey, they're just like us."

She began working with four-time Grammy-winning producer Tony Brown in 2017, after she was introduced to him by her manager, Steve Pritchard. Emi and Brown co-produced her sixth studio album, Family Wars, which was released in 2019. The album includes a duet with singer-songwriter Jim Lauderdale, back up singing on one song by The McCrary Sisters and creative collaborations with other prominent musical artists in Nashville including songwriters Vicky McGehee, Kyle Jacobs, Chelle Rose, Autumn McEntire and Fish Fisher. In a review, the music magazine No Depression wrote that the album "establishes EmiSunshine as a strong creative force... She's just plain good, with talents outliving the novelty that went along with her earliest exposure at age 9 and establishing her as someone bold and talented enough to tackle today’s issues while honoring yesterday’s folk traditions."

On December 11, 2019, she received The ASCAP Foundation Desmond Child Anthem Award in New York City. The award was established by ASCAP Board member, composer and producer Desmond Child to recognize promising young artists. Child called EmiSunshine "one of the most talented up-and-coming artists and songwriters I've ever heard in AMERICAN music."

In March 2020, acclaimed funk musician Bootsy Collins invited EmiSunshine to collaborate with him on the song "Stars" to benefit the Recording Academy's MusiCares COVID-19 Relief Fund. Released on June 12, the single and an accompanying music video featured guest appearances by Dr. Cornel West, Béla Fleck, Steve Jordan (drummer), Victor Wooten, Olvido Ruiz, Manou Gallo, Uché and others. A remixed version of "Stars" later appeared as "Stargate" on Collins' album The Power of the One, which was released on October 23, 2020.

On March 21 and 22, 2021, EmiSunshine appeared on American Idol, performing the Johnny Cash song "I Walk the Line" as a duet with fellow contestant Alex Miller, a 17-year-old singer from Kentucky. Country star Luke Bryan, a judge on the program, gave the pair "kudos" and said that Emi "really carried a lot of that performance." Both artists advanced to the "Showstopper" round one week later, but did not continue beyond that.

In February 2022, EmiSunshine released her first solo album, Diamonds, receiving mostly positive reviews, with No Depression describing it as “(filtering) the traditional sounds of roots music through pop.” American Songwriter wrote that “Diamonds can be considered an ambitious offering from an artist whose talent and ambition reside well beyond her years.”

EmiSunshine's 10th studio album, Sideshow was released in October 2023. In a review, Wide Open Country described the album as "another solid example of how to acknowledge the past while pushing folksier music into the future."

EmiSunshine performs about 150 shows a year across the country. She has performed twice on Marty Stuart’s Late Night Jam at the Ryman Auditorium during CMA Music Fest and has had 16 performances at the Grand Ole Opry. She has also appeared on several national television shows, including Little Big Shots, Song of the Mountains, WoodSongs Old-Time Radio Hour and Pickler & Ben.

== Discography ==
=== Studio albums ===
Title	Album details
Strong as the Tall Pine	Release date: 2011; Label: independent; Formats: CD
Wide River to Cross	Release date: 2011; Label: independent; Formats: CD
Black Sunday '35	Release date: January 25, 2014; Label: independent; Formats: CD, digital
American Dream	Release date: October 22, 2016; Label: independent; Formats: CD, digital
Ragged Dreams	Release date: August 25, 2017; Label: independent; Formats: CD, digital
Family Wars	Release date: October 18, 2019; Label: Little Blackbird Records; Formats: CD, vinyl, digital
Universe	Release date: January 28, 2022; Label: Little Blackbird Records; Formats: CD, digital
Diamonds	Release date: February 18, 2022; Label: Little Blackbird Records; Formats: CD, vinyl, digital
Sideshow	Release date: October 6, 2023; Label: Little Blackbird Records; Formats: CD, vinyl, digital

=== Singles ===
Title	Album details
Stars (with Bootsy Collins)	Release date: June 12, 2020; Label: Bootzilla Records; Formats: Digital
Stargate (with Bootsy Collins) on the album The Power of the One	Release date: October 23, 2020; Label: Bootzilla Records; Formats: CD, digital

== Touring members ==
- EmiSunshine – lead vocals, guitar, ukulele
- Randall Hamilton – upright bass, harmony
- John Hamilton – mandolin
- "Uncle" Bobby Hill – drums
