= Reagan (2011 film) =

2011 American documentary film

- Release poster
- Directed by: Eugene Jarecki
- Written by: Eugene Jarecki
- Produced by: Eugene Jarecki
- Cinematography: Étienne Sauret
- Edited by: Simon Barker
- Music by: Robert Miller
- Production company: Charlotte Street Films
- Distributed by: HBO (USA) BBC (UK, on BBC4)
- Release date: January 23, 2011
- Running time: 105 minutes
- Country: United States

Reagan is a 2011 American documentary film, written and directed by Eugene Jarecki, covering the life and presidency of Ronald Reagan. The documentary was aired as part of the centennial anniversary of Reagan's birth, and screened at the 2011 Sundance Film Festival. The film includes interviews with and commentary by several people who worked in Reagan's White House.

It was reviewed favorably by New York Times columnist Bob Herbert, who wrote, "Mr. Jarecki’s documentary does a first-rate job of respectfully separating the real from the mythical, the significant from the nonsense."
