= The Opponent (2000 film) =

- Directed by: Eugene Jarecki
- Written by: Eugene Jarecki
- Produced by: Eugene Jarecki; Paige Simpson
- Starring: Erika Eleniak; James Colby; Aunjanue Ellis; John Doman; Harry O'Reilly
- Cinematography: Joe Di Gennaro
- Edited by: Simon Barker
- Music by: Vytas Nagisetty
- Distributed by: Trimark Video
- Release date: 2000
- Running time: 90 minutes
- Country: United States
- Language: English

The Opponent is a sports drama film released in 2000. The film stars Erika Eleniak and James Colby.

== Plot ==
When Patty Sullivan gets tired of the abuse of her boyfriend, she decides to take boxing lessons to protect herself. During her practices, she gains the attention of fellow boxer, June, and promoter, Fred. They introduce her to Tommy, a trainer that runs a local gym. Tommy takes Patty through a rigorous training program to prepare her for her first professional match.

== Filming ==
The film was shot in several New York locations like Port Chester, Troy, and Waterford.

== Cast ==
- Erika Eleniak as Patty Sullivan
- James Colby as Tommy
- Aunjanue Ellis as June
- John Doman as Fred
- Harry O'Reilly as Jack

== Release ==
The film premiered at the AFI Film Festival on October 20, 2000. This was followed the same year by a premier on New York City.

== See also ==
- List of boxing films
