= Vytas Nagisetty =

Indian-born musician (born 1971)

- Born: March 8, 1971 (age 55); Mumbai, India
- Origin: Toledo, Ohio, US
- Genres: Jazz, rock
- Years active: 1993–present
- Label: Razor & Tie

Vytas Nagisetty (born March 8, 1971), known mononymously as Vytas, is an Indian-born musician. Vytas has recorded a number of film scores for American and French motion pictures, and has written songs appearing on soundtrack albums and numerous independent recordings. He also worked extensively as a bassist in the San Francisco Bay Area during the 1990s.

== Biography ==
Nagisetty was born in Mumbai, India, and raised in Toledo, Ohio. The son of a Lithuanian physicist and an Indian mathematician, he began playing music at the early age of 5. Having started on trumpet, and successively switching to piano, and then bansuri flute, Vytas finally settled into electric bass as his main instrument by the age of 10. At age 14, he added guitar to his repertoire and began writing songs. By age 17, he was selling tapes of original songs through local record stores. After high school, he studied music and French at the University of California, Berkeley. His musical education focused on composition, and performance in jazz and classical music. He studied double bass under Steve Tramontozzi, the principal bassist of the San Francisco Symphony.

== Musical career ==
=== Film Scores ===
Vytas' musical studies brought him to Paris, France, where he composed the score for Morgan J. Freeman's film Godard disait que... Later when he moved to New York City, Vytas was favored by a number of independent film makers for his ability to compose and produce music, as well as perform on several instruments. This range of abilities allowed him single-handedly produce and perform the score for an entire film.

In 1998, Vytas composed the score for the Freeman film Desert Blue, which marked his first American film project. He would go on to compose music for several other studio and independent films, including Freeman's The Cherry Picker.

=== Ensemble projects ===
Both in France and subsequently back in the United States, Vytas has played in dozens of jazz and rock bands, including with noted jazz artist Pharoah Sanders. He has been active in bands in the San Francisco Bay Area, Manhattan, and currently, Toledo.

Vytas released a 5-song EP in 2007 called Space Cadet. The independently produced album drew positive reviews from the Toledo Blade, the Toledo City Paper, and the Toledo Free Press. It features Vytas and his Electric Outfit, a power trio consisting of Vytas on vocals and guitar, Jason Quick on bass, and John "Bubba" Baker on drums and vocal harmony.

In March 2007, Todd Ovall joined the Electric Outfit on bass, replacing Jason Quick.

== Discography ==
- 1993 Godard disait que.. (film score)
- 1998 Desert Blue (film score)
- 1998 Desert Blue Original Soundtrack (two songs, credited as "Vytas Nagisetty" and "VDog, Funny Bone")
- 1999 Zoo (film score)
- 1999 Hostage (film score)
- 2000 The Cherry Picker (film score)
- 2000 The Opponent (film score)
- 2007 Space Cadet (5-song EP, Vytas and his Electric Outfit)
- 2008 Glass City (film score)
- 2009 Sunny (18-song album, Vytas and his Electric Outfit, pending)
