= The Trials of Henry Kissinger =

- DVD cover
- Directed by: Eugene Jarecki
- Written by: Alex Gibney; Christopher Hitchens
- Based on: The Trial of Henry Kissinger by Christopher Hitchens
- Produced by: Roy Ackerman; Jennie Amias; Alex Gibney; David Holbrooke; Eugene Jarecki; Susan Motamed
- Narrated by: Brian Cox
- Cinematography: Greg Andracke; Mark Benjamin; Gary Grieg; Christopher Li; Brett Wiley
- Edited by: Simon Barker
- Music by: Peter Nashel
- Production company: Arte France Cinéma
- Distributed by: First Run Features
- Release date: June 14, 2002 (New York City)
- Running time: 80 minutes
- Language: English
- Box office: $515,678 (US)

The Trials of Henry Kissinger is a 2002 documentary film directed by Eugene Jarecki and narrated by Brian Cox. Inspired by Christopher Hitchens' 2001 book The Trial of Henry Kissinger, the film examines war crimes alleged to have been perpetrated by Henry Kissinger, the National Security Advisor and later Secretary of State under Presidents Nixon and Ford.

== Reception ==
Review aggregator Rotten Tomatoes collected 58 reviews, of which 95% were positive. Metacritic gave the film a score of 72/100 based on 23 critics.
