= Nicholas Jarecki =

American screenwriter

- Born: June 25, 1979 (age 47); New York City, US
- Occupations: Film director, producer, writer
- Years active: 1995–present
- Notable work: Crisis, Arbitrage, The Outsider, The Informers
- Relatives: Henry Jarecki (father); Andrew Jarecki (half-brother); Eugene Jarecki (half-brother)

Nicholas Jarecki (born June 25, 1979) is an American filmmaker best known for his 2012 feature film Arbitrage.

== Early life ==
Jarecki was born on June 25, 1979, in New York City, to Henry Jarecki and Marjorie Heidsieck. His half-brothers are fellow filmmakers Andrew and Eugene Jarecki. and finance executive Thomas A. Jarecki. His father is Jewish and his mother is from a Catholic background.

== Career ==
At 15 he was hired as a technical consultant on the 1995 film Hackers, where his job was to consult with the actors and director about computer hacking. Jarecki took an interest in filmmaking on the set of Hackers, recalling, "I kept noticing that there was this guy that the actors seemed to really look up to and respect, so I asked 'Who's that?' and they told me he was the director. Then I knew it was clear what I wanted to do."

At 19 Jarecki graduated from New York University and went on to try directing music videos to get noticed in the film community. After no one expressed interest in his video services he decided to interview his favorite directors to see how they got their start. A literary agent introduced by a family friend liked the idea and got Jarecki a $50,000 advance from Doubleday to write the 2001 book Breaking In: How 20 Film Directors Got Their Start.

In 2005 Jarecki produced, directed, and edited his first feature film The Outsider in which he chronicled the 12-day shoot of the thriller When Will I Be Loved. Showtime acquired the film and it made its television premiere during August 2007. Netflix's Red Envelope Entertainment label acquired the home video rights. The Outsider has been received well, currently holding 69% on Rotten Tomatoes and generally favorable reviews on Metacritic.

Jarecki next worked in 2008, serving as an executive producer for the documentary Tyson. In the same year he served as an executive producer for The Informers which he co-wrote with novelist Bret Easton Ellis (whose novel the film was based on) and was even set to direct it at one point.

The following year Jarecki founded Beat Sheet Central, a popular script writing resource. He returned to directing and writing with the 3-minute short film The Weight in 2009 as well.

At the Sundance Film Festival in January 2012 Jarecki debuted the first feature film he both wrote and directed, Arbitrage. starring Richard Gere, Susan Sarandon, Tim Roth and Brit Marling. Lionsgate and Roadside Attractions acquired the film and it opened in US theaters September 2012. Arbitrage was praised by critics receiving an 87% positive rating on Rotten Tomatoes, making it one of the top 20 reviewed films of the year. It won a number of awards including the National Board of Review for "Top 10 Independent Films", as well as a Golden Globe nomination for "Best Actor – Drama" for its star, Richard Gere. The film was also a commercial success; although made inexpensively, it grossed over $48 million in worldwide box office and VOD.

It was announced in October 2012 that his next film would be Fuel, "a detective story set in Los Angeles amid a futuristic world of electric vehicles and alternative energy."

In 2019, Jarecki directed, wrote, and produced the multi-narrative film about the opioid epidemic, Crisis, starring Gary Oldman, Luke Evans, Evangeline Lilly, Armie Hammer, Michelle Rodriguez, Veronica Ferres, Mia Kirshner, Greg Kinnear and Lily-Rose Depp. The film was released in 2021, and was well-received by critics and audiences, ranking as the #1 best selling film on iTunes for nearly two weeks during its initial US release and as the #1 box office debut film in Australia. The film was also the #1 independent film in theaters in its opening weekend in the US.

Crisis was released on Netflix on July 1, 2026.

== Personal life ==
On May 14, 2009, Jarecki sent Jeffrey Epstein (then serving time in jail for procuring a minor for prostitution) an email reading "Let's hang out. When are the bracelets off?"

In December 2015, Jarecki was reported to be in a relationship with Courtney Love.

== Filmography ==
Documentary film

| Year | Title | Director | Producer | Notes |
|---|---|---|---|---|
| 2005 | The Outsider | Yes | Yes | Also editor |
| 2008 | Tyson | No | Executive | |

Feature film

| Year | Title | Director | Writer | Producer | Notes |
|---|---|---|---|---|---|
| 2008 | The Informers | No | Yes | Executive | Also editor |
| 2012 | Arbitrage | Yes | Yes | No | Nominated—San Sebastián International Film Festival for Golden Shell |
| 2021 | Crisis | Yes | Yes | Yes | |

Short film

| Year | Title | Director | Writer |
|---|---|---|---|
| 2009 | The Weight | Yes | Yes |

Technical consultant

- Hackers (1995) (Uncredited)

== Bibliography ==
- Breaking In: How 20 Film Directors Got Their Start (ISBN 0767906748) (2001)
