= Crisis (2021 film) =

2021 crime thriller film

- Official poster
- Directed by: Nicholas Jarecki
- Written by: Nicholas Jarecki
- Produced by: Nicholas Jarecki; Cassian Elwes
- Starring: Gary Oldman; Armie Hammer; Evangeline Lilly; Greg Kinnear; Michelle Rodriguez; Luke Evans; Lily-Rose Depp; Scott Mescudi; Martin Donovan; Guy Nadon; Mia Kirshner
- Cinematography: Nicolas Bolduc
- Edited by: Duff Smith
- Music by: Raphael Reed
- Production companies: LOD Productions; Bideford Productions; Green Room Films; Martingale Pictures; Flying Horse Productions; Construction Film; Tuesday Films; Elevation Pictures; Burn Later Productions; Such Content; Caviar; Paradise Entertainment
- Distributed by: Quiver Distribution; Elevation Pictures
- Release dates: February 26, 2021 (United States); March 16, 2021 (Canada)
- Running time: 118 minutes
- Countries: United States; Canada; Belgium
- Language: English
- Box office: $1.1 million

Crisis is a 2021 crime thriller film written, produced and directed by Nicholas Jarecki. The film's ensemble cast includes Gary Oldman, Armie Hammer, Evangeline Lilly, Greg Kinnear, Michelle Rodriguez, Luke Evans, Lily-Rose Depp, Kid Cudi (Scott Mescudi) and Martin Donovan.

Crisis was released in the United States on February 26, 2021, by Quiver Distribution, in Canada on March 16, 2021, by Elevation Pictures and on March 16, 2021, in Australia by Universal Pictures.

== Plot ==
Teenage drug runner Cedric Beauville is captured and arrested by the Royal Canadian Mounted Police on the Canada–United States border in possession of large quantities of illegal fentanyl pills.

Everett University research scientist Dr. Tyrone Brower is contracted by Northlight Pharmaceuticals to carry out a study in support of their newest product, Klaralon. The drug is being touted as the first non-addictive painkiller and is due to be released shortly as a replacement for Oxycodone. The study uncovers concerning results; Klaralon initially presents as non-addictive when taken daily for the first 7 days (parameters specified by Northlight), however after 7 days it becomes almost three times more addictive than Oxycodone. Realising the public health implications, Brower recommends to Northlight they delay Klaralon's release for further testing, which they object to. Board member Dr. Bill Simons tries to tempt Brower into changing his mind by offering a large research grant, but Brower refuses. With Northlight being one of the university's main donors, Brower finds himself under pressure from department head Greg Talbot to approve the study, but again is reluctant. Northlight begins leaking information to discredit his reputation, and Everett University revokes his tenure. Desperate, Brower contacts the FDA, being put in contact with investigator Ben Walker.

Detroit-based DEA agent Jake Kelly has managed to infiltrate two large scale drug cartels running fentanyl. One is run by the Armenian Mafia who operate pill mills across the US. The other is based in Montreal, Quebec controlled by drug kingpin Claude 'Mother' Veroche, who operates out of a nondescript restaurant called La Marina. Kelly intends to convince the two cartels to enter into business, so both leaders can be arrested at once when they meet. Kelly has personal motivation for bringing them down, due to his younger sister suffering from crippling heroin addiction. Kelly's relationship with Mother becomes strained when news of Cedric's capture comes to light, with Mother becoming concerned there is an informant in his organisation. Due to funding concerns, Kelly's superior agent Garrett gives him a reduced timescale to organise the meet. Mother has Cedric killed in custody for his silence and executes his second in command Guy Broussard after discovering he has been speaking with the authorities.

Architect and recovering Oxycodone addict Claire Reimann becomes concerned when her 16-year-old son David does not return home from hockey practice. He is later found dead as a result of a fentanyl overdose, shocking Claire who is convinced he never took drugs. Although the Detroit Police Department treats it as an accidental death, she hires a private investigator who determines David was forced to take the fentanyl and was murdered. Through her son's social media accounts, she tracks down one of his friends, who confesses several teenagers from the hockey team (from both Detroit and Montreal) work for Mother as drug runners, although David had only done it once. Claire crosses the Ambassador Bridge and travels to Montreal where she hires another private investigator, who provides her with information on Mother and a privately made firearm. She threatens another drug runner, Derrick Millebran, who believes that Mother is killing them to tie up loose ends after Cedric's arrest. Kelly becomes aware of Claire's activities through investigation of Cedric's associates and intercepts her outside La Marina. He does not arrest her, but instead unloads her gun and urges her to leave for her own good.

The meeting between the two cartels goes ahead, covertly monitored by a joint DEA-RCMP taskforce. However, an RCMP surveillance officer accidentally gives away his position, resulting in a shootout that kills Kelly's partner, Special Agent Stanley Foster. Mother also escapes, believed to have fled to Algeria. Given the seizure of the drugs at the meet, both US and Canadian agencies decide to disband the continued search for Mother and the Armenians. Outraged, Kelly goes against orders and travels to La Marina, where he threatens an employee who tells him Mother is still in Canada but is planning to escape via seaplane that evening from the Port of Montreal. Claire is also given this information by her private investigator. Kelly arrives at the port, but has been beaten there by Claire, who opens fire and kills Mother. His bodyguard shoots her in the arm, but is swiftly shot by Kelly. He then replaces the men's weapons with Claire's privately made firearm and his own unregistered back-up gun, to make it appear they shot each other. He treats her gunshot wound and tells her he does not intend to arrest her.

A last-ditch effort by Northlight, CEO Dr. Meg Holmes also fails to convince Brower to come on board, and the company is subjected to an FDA hearing. To Brower's shock, the agency does not revoke Northlight's permissions for Klaralon's release, noting that the potential benefits to the public outweigh the dangers highlighted by his study. Walker is also reassigned as a retaliatory measure. Despite the legal risk, Brower breaks his non-disclosure agreement and goes to the press. He is later hired by the University of Michigan and is seen giving an introductory lecture to a crowded auditorium.

== Cast ==
- Gary Oldman as Dr. Tyrone Brower, a research scientist at Everett University
- Armie Hammer as Jake Kelly, DEA Agent
- Evangeline Lilly as Claire Reimann, an architect and recovering addict
- Greg Kinnear as Dean Greg Talbot, Brower's superior at Everett University
- Michelle Rodriguez as Supervisor Garrett, Kelly's DEA superior
- Luke Evans as Dr. Bill Simons, a senior board member of Northlight Pharmaceuticals
- Lily-Rose Depp as Emmie Kelly, Jake's younger sister and a drug addict
- Guy Nadon as Mother, an illegal fentanyl distributor operating in Quebec
- Veronica Ferres as Dr. Meg Holmes, the CEO of Northlight Pharmaceuticals
- Scott Mescudi as Ben Walker, an investigator with the Food and Drug Administration
- Mia Kirshner as Susan, Claire's sister
- Michael Aronov as Minas, an Armenian Mafia member controlling fentanyl distribution across the United States
- Éric Bruneau as Guy Broussard, Mother's second in command and enforcer
- Duke Nicholson as Derrick Millebran, a hockey player from Montreal working as a drug runner
- Martin Donovan as Lawrence Morgan, the founder of Northlight Pharmaceuticals
- Indira Varma as Madira Brower, Dr. Tyrone Bowers' pregnant wife
- Nicholas Jarecki as Stanley Foster, a DEA Special Agent and partner of Kelly
- Ellora Torchia as Reeva, a scientist working as part of Brower's research team
- Adam Tsekhman as Armen, member of the Armenian Mafia and partner of Minas
- Hiro Kanagawa as Dr. Ishiyama, a friend and colleague of Bower

== Production ==
In February 2019, it was announced that Armie Hammer, Gary Oldman, Evangeline Lilly and Veronica Ferres had joined the cast of the film, then titled Dreamland, with Nicholas Jarecki directing from a screenplay he wrote. Greg Kinnear, Michelle Rodriguez and Lily-Rose Depp were added to the cast in February. In March 2019, Adam Tsekhman joined the cast of the film. In April 2019, Sam Worthington, Indira Varma, Kid Cudi, Luke Evans, Mia Kirshner, Michael Aronov and Martin Donovan joined the cast of the film. In December 2019, it was announced that Duke Nicholson had joined the cast of the film.

Principal photography began in February 2019 in Montreal and Detroit.

== Release ==
In December 2020, it was announced Quiver Distribution had acquired United States distribution rights, with some other distributors which acquired the film being Elevation Pictures for Canada, Universal Pictures for most of the world, Warner Bros. Pictures for the United Kingdom, Metropolitan Filmexport for France and Sony Pictures for airlines. Quiver then set it for a February 26, 2021 nationwide theatrical release in the United States, followed by a home entertainment release on March 5, 2021. The film was theatrically released internationally on March 26, 2021. It was released in Canada on March 16, 2021, by Elevation Pictures.

== Reception ==
=== Box office ===
Crisis was the highest-grossing independent film at the US box office in its opening weekend, earning $202,489 across a total of 216 screens. It had the second-highest per-screen average of all films playing that weekend, with an average of $883 per screen. It was also the highest-grossing film playing in limited release.

Crisis was the #1 debut film during its opening weekend in Australia, placing #4 of all films in release.

=== Home entertainment ===
Crisis was released on home streaming platforms in the US on March 6, 2021. It quickly climbed the iTunes charts where it reached No. 1 in the drama, thriller and independent categories, as well as #2 in overall rentals within its first 24 hours.

It reached No. 1 of all films rented on the iTunes charts on March 9, 2021, and held the #1 position for eight days, one of only four films to do so in 2021. It also ranked No. 2 on Amazon in its first week of release, and placed in the top ten on Spectrum VOD for two weeks running.

=== Critical response ===
The film divided critics and audiences and has generated controversy surrounding its reviews.

Critics rated the film less positively at first, although with time its score has risen. On the review aggregator website Rotten Tomatoes, 66% of 166 critics' reviews are positive, with an average rating of 5.9/10. The website's consensus reads: "With its serious-minded story, Crisis aims higher than many crime thrillers -- but uneven acting and a spotty script mean the end result falls short of its goals." Metacritic, which uses a weighted average, assigned the film a score of 41 out of 100, based on 19 critics, indicating "mixed or average" reviews.

Advance reviews for the film were very positive. Variety's Marc Malkin wrote that the film is "intense and timely [...] with exceptional performances, fine storytelling, and master craftsmanship." KTLA's Scott Mantz wrote that the film is "riveting, gripping, and provocative. A terrific thriller with superb performances across the board," while WOR's Joe Neumaier described the film as "a multilayered dramatic thriller that tackles every vicious part of the opioid emergency. Gary Oldman, Armie Hammer, and Evangeline Lilly deliver urgent, powerful turns in this finely crafted film that is impressively up-to-the-minute."

After the release of these quotes, one of the film's lead actors, Armie Hammer, was publicly embroiled in a sexual abuse scandal.

Upon general release, much sentiment for the film outside of some major outlets like Variety and Deadline was markedly negative. Peter DeBruge of Variety gave the film a positive review, noting that Crisis was "compelling, relevant filmmaking... [with] no shortage of engaging and/or wrenching material..." while Pete Hammond of Deadline wrote that "Crisis comes along at the right time... Oldman and Lily are excellent, and Hammer is very fine as well."

Many other critics were negative, noting the film's similarity to Steven Soderbergh's Traffic, with John DeFore of The Hollywood Reporter describing the film as "Well-meaning but underwhelming."
