= The Six Billion Dollar Man =

2025 documentary film

- Theatrical release poster
- Directed by: Eugene Jarecki
- Produced by: Kathleen Fournier; Eugene Jarecki
- Cinematography: David McDowall; Jack Harrison; Derek Hallquist; Juan Passarelli; Joe Fletcher
- Edited by: David Fairhead; Martin Reimers; Zora Schiffer
- Music by: Akin Sevgör; Niklas Paschburg; Robert Miller; Luis Flores; Harold Charon Cisneros
- Production company: Charlotte Street Films
- Distributed by: Watermelon Pictures
- Release dates: May 21, 2025 (Cannes); December 19, 2025 (United Kingdom and Ireland)
- Running time: 129 minutes
- Countries: United States; Germany; France
- Language: English

The Six Billion Dollar Man is a 2025 documentary film directed by Eugene Jarecki, tracing the saga of lightning-rod WikiLeaks founder Julian Assange, whose recent release from prison has reignited a global debate around press freedom. The film had its world premiere at the 2025 Cannes Film Festival where it won the prestigious L'Œil d'or Grand Prize for documentary and the first-ever Golden Globe Award given to a documentary filmmaker.

== Premise ==
The documentary deals with Assange's battle against extradition to the United States. Framed as a high-tech international thriller, the film incorporates privileged access to WikiLeaks, CCTV and other archival footage and never-before-seen evidence to explore the increasingly precarious position of journalists in a world where the defence of truth is under threat.

== Cast ==
- Julian Assange
- Stella Assange
- Pamela Anderson
- Jennifer Robinson
- Edward Snowden
- Naomi Klein
- Daniel Ellsberg
- Chris Hedges
- Jeremy Scahill
- President Rafael Correa
- Bjartmar Alexandersson

== Release ==
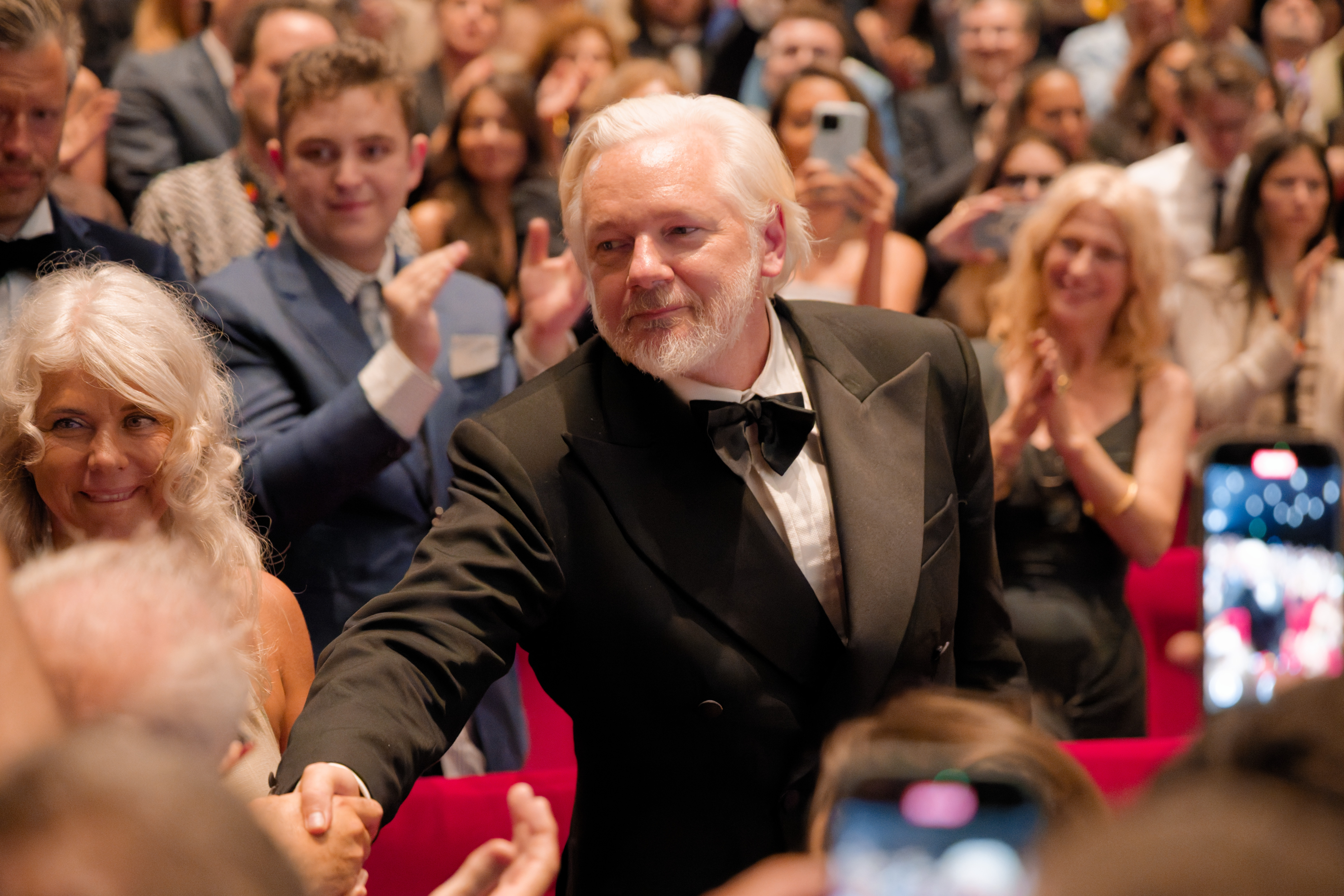
Assange in the crowd at the 2025 premiere at Cannes

It had its world premiere at the 2025 Cannes Film Festival on May 21, 2025, in the Special Screenings section. It was previously set to world premiere at the 2025 Sundance Film Festival. However, it was pulled from the lineup due to "significant and unexpected developments". In November 2025, Watermelon Pictures acquired distribution rights to the film. It is set to be theatrically released in the United Kingdom and Ireland on December 19, 2025. It is set to be theatrically released in the United States in early 2026.

== Reception ==
=== Critical response ===
The film has received four star reviews from a number of major outlets including The Guardian, The Times, The Financial Times, The Hollywood Reporter, Variety, and Time Out.

Editorial accolades have been largely positive with The Irish Times saying “Eugene Jarecki’s The Six Billion Dollar Man may be the most chilling film of 2025, not simply because of the notoriety of Julian Assange, its subject, but also as a clinical exposé of the elaborate machinery of state power, media hostility and private opportunism.” Time Out noted that “Jarecki’s film, a conspiracy thriller in documentary clothing, provides a corrective to the public image of this deeply polarising figure… the American filmmaker [Jarecki] takes on – and down – a global system of power that should worry the hell out of us all." The Guardian echoed this in saying “Jarecki’s army of eye-witnesses run the gamut from Naomi Klein to Pamela Anderson (a fan and frequent visitor) to the former president of Ecuador, while the film’s sprawling crime scene eventually straddles half the globe.” The Film Verdict praises “The Six Billion Dollar Man is a masterwork and a near-masterpiece.” Though Screen Daily says “…the film ultimately works better as a conversation-starter about the freedom of the press than as a layered portrait of the controversial activist.” The Times concludes, "As far as the American director Eugene Jarecki is concerned Assange is a wronged and righteous hero and Jarecki’s meticulously researched, two-hour film argues that case convincingly."
