= Arbitrage (film) =

2012 American crime drama film

- Theatrical release poster
- Directed by: Nicholas Jarecki
- Written by: Nicholas Jarecki
- Produced by: Laura Bickford; Kevin Turen; Justin Nappi; Robert Salerno; Mohammed Al Turki; Michael Heller
- Starring: Richard Gere; Susan Sarandon; Tim Roth; Brit Marling; Laetitia Casta; Nate Parker
- Cinematography: Yorick Le Saux
- Edited by: Douglas Crise
- Music by: Cliff Martinez
- Production companies: Green Room Films; Treehouse Pictures; Artina Films
- Distributed by: Lionsgate; Roadside Attractions
- Release dates: January 21, 2012 (Sundance Film Festival); September 14, 2012 (United States)
- Running time: 107 minutes
- Countries: United States; Poland
- Language: English
- Budget: $12 million
- Box office: $35.5 million

Arbitrage is a 2012 American crime drama film directed by Nicholas Jarecki, and starring Richard Gere, Nate Parker, Susan Sarandon, Tim Roth and Brit Marling. Filming began in April 2011 in New York City. It opened in U.S. theaters in September 2012.

The plot follows the personal and professional troubles of a hedge fund manager as he approaches retirement.

== Plot ==
New York City hedge fund magnate Robert Miller manages a fund with his daughter Brooke and is about to sell it for a handsome profit. He is having an affair with a much younger woman, gallery owner Julie Cote, whom he has also helped financially. However, unbeknownst to Brooke and most of his other employees, Miller has cooked his company's books and borrowed $412 million from an associate in order to cover an investment loss and avoid being arrested for fraud.

The potential buyer, James Mayfield, is stalling the process, and Miller's lender wants to call in the loan, but Miller says he needs the money to stay in his account until the audit for the sale is complete. They schedule a meeting at a restaurant during which contracts are to be signed, and it's the same night as Julie's gallery show, which Miller has promised to attend. Julie continually texts and calls Miller throughout the meeting, which drags on as they wait for Mayfield to arrive. When Mayfield doesn't show up, Miller leaves in disgust, but not before Brooke informs him that she has found some financial discrepancies in old ledgers.

Miller finally goes to Julie's opening, but angry on his late arrival she tells him to leave. He comes back and they fight, but he convinces her to go with him on a trip upstate. Miller dozes off at the wheel and crashes the car, resulting in Julie's death. An injured Miller almost calls 9-1-1, then realizes he must cover up his involvement. He flees the scene as the car bursts into flames. Miller calls Jimmy Grant, the son of his late chauffeur, who feels loyal to Miller for paying his father's medical bills. After Jimmy drives him home, Miller removes security camera DVDs that show his late arrival, burns his bloody clothing, then goes to bed bruised at 4:30 am, arousing wife Ellen's suspicion.

The next day, Miller discusses his "hypothetical" situation with his lawyer, who advises the hypothetical person to turn himself in, as the lies required to keep the story a secret will pile up. The lawyer also mentions that Ellen has visited an estate lawyer. Miller is later questioned by police detective Bryer, who is keen on arresting him for manslaughter. Meanwhile, Brooke discovers Miller's fraud and, realizing that she could be implicated, confronts him. Miller admits to the fraud but insists that he will handle it. Jimmy is arrested and placed before a grand jury, but still refuses to admit to helping Miller cover up the crash, although this might lead to his incrimination. Miller tells Jimmy that investors are depending on him and that waiting for the sale to close before coming forward would serve the greater good. Eventually, Miller gets himself and Jimmy out of trouble by proving that Bryer's claimed "evidence" were doctored photos bearing Jimmy's plate number.

With the audit complete and the company in the clear for the sale, Miller meets Mayfield and they agree on a price. Later, Ellen confronts Miller and offers him a deal: if he signs a separation agreement that gives all voting rights and money to her non-profit foundation and their daughter, she will lie and say she was with him the night of the crash; if he refuses, she will tell the truth and he will go to prison. Meanwhile, Mayfield discusses a secondary audit that has been performed on Miller's company. The report does show a problem, but Mayfield chooses to ignore it, as the sale has already been made and further scrutiny would be counter-productive to the image of his own corporation.

In the final scene, Miller addresses a banquet honoring him, with Ellen at his side and Brooke introducing him. Tension among them is evident but nobody seems to notice. Smiling as he approaches the podium to deliver his speech, the screen cuts to black.

== Cast ==
- Richard Gere as Robert Miller
- Susan Sarandon as Ellen Miller
- Tim Roth as Det. Bryer
- Brit Marling as Brooke Miller
- Laetitia Casta as Julie Cote
- Nate Parker as Jimmy Grant
- Stuart Margolin as Syd Felder
- Monica Raymund as Reina
- Chris Eigeman as Gavin Briar
- Larry Pine as Jeffrey Greenberg
- Graydon Carter as James Mayfield
- Bruce Altman as Chris Vogler
- Curtiss Cook as Det. Mills
- Paula Devicq as Cindy
- Josh Pais as John Aimes
- Reg E. Cathey as Earl Monroe
- Felix Solis as A.D.A. Deferlito
- Gabrielle Lazure as Sandrine Cote
- Shawn Elliott as Flores
- Austin Lysy as Peter Miller
- Tibor Feldman as Judge Rittenband
- Jamie Johnson as Julie's Suitor
- Alyssa Sutherland as Jeffrey's Receptionist
- Betsy Aidem as Vogier's Secretary
- Paul Fitzgerald as Paul Barnes
- Zack Robidas as Tom

== Reception ==
=== Box office ===
Lionsgate and Roadside Attractions paid $2.1 million to acquire the United States rights of this film, and they spent around $3 million promoting the film's theatrical and VOD release. The film went on to gross $7.9 million in the United States box office and $14 million in United States VOD sales. The film grossed over $35,485,056 in the global box office.

The film also outperformed financially in several areas: it set a record as the highest-grossing "day-and-date" release of all time, meaning it outperformed all other films released simultaneously in theaters and "on-demand". It also opened to a per-screen average in the United States in excess of $10,000, making it one of the highest per-screen average films of the year. It was the top film in Israel two weeks running and no. 3 in Spain two weeks running, nearing a Spanish theatrical gross of US$5 million. It broke independent box office records in many other countries including Australia, the United Arab Emirates, and Switzerland.

=== Critical response ===
On Rotten Tomatoes, 87% of 173 critics gave the film a positive review, with an average rating of 7.10/10. The website's critics consensus reads: "Arbitrage is both a tense thriller and a penetrating character study, elevated by the strength of a typically assured performance from Richard Gere." On Metacritic, the film has a weighted average score of 73 out of 100, based on 35 critics, indicating "generally favorable" reviews.

=== Accolades ===
Gere was nominated for the Golden Globe Award for Best Actor – Motion Picture Drama at the 70th Golden Globe Awards for his performance in Arbitrage.
