= Maidstone (film) =

1970 film by Norman Mailer

- Original promo card
- Directed by: Norman Mailer
- Written by: Norman Mailer
- Produced by: Buzz Farber; Norman Mailer; Leo Garen
- Starring: Norman Mailer; Rip Torn; Ultra Violet; Joy Bang
- Cinematography: Nick Doob; Richard Leacock; D. A. Pennebaker; Nicholas T. Proferes; Sheldon Rochlin; Diane Rocklin; Jan Welt
- Edited by: Lana Jokel; Norman Mailer; Jan Welt
- Music by: Isaac Hayes; Wes Montgomery; Carol Stevens
- Production company: Supreme Mix Productions
- Distributed by: Supreme Mix Productions; The Criterion Collection (DVD)
- Release date: 1970
- Running time: 110 minutes
- Country: United States
- Language: English

Maidstone is a 1970 American independent drama film written, produced and directed by Norman Mailer. It stars Mailer, Rip Torn and Ultra Violet. The film focuses on a famous film director Norman Kingsley, who runs for president while a group of friends, relatives, employees and lobbyists gather to discuss possible assassination plots against him. The title refers to a private country club in East Hampton, New York.

Maidstone began production in 1968 and was not completed until 1970. Production occurred over five days at various East Hampton estates. The original footage was 45 hours long, but after the editing process the producers came up with a 110-minute film. It took them three weeks to edit. The film cost $200,000 to produce, causing Mailer to sell part of his interest in The Village Voice. The film would eventually bankrupt Mailer before completion. While producing his latest film about a brothel, Kingsley's brother Raoul continues to cling to him for his money.

Maidstone was shown in a select few theaters in 1971. A DVD was released in France in 2006. This led to a number of public screenings at that time, but until then the film remained in obscurity. These limited screenings may have lessened its potential direct influence on future films. Critical reviews were generally negative.

Maidstone uses the Norman Kingsley character to critique media, politics, and the counterculture of the 1960s, but its misogynistic and racist treatment of women is often seen as reflecting Mailer himself and sparked lasting feminist criticism and controversy. The film is now famous for the improvised fight scene between Mailer and Torn. Torn struck Mailer in the head with a hammer, Mailer's scalp opened up, and a vicious fight ensued. Torn energetically strangled Mailer, who bit off a small chunk of Torn's ear until the fight was broken up by Mailer's wife Beverly Bentley. The fight, in which the actors called each other by their real names, made it into the film.

== Plot ==
Norman T. Kingsley is a filmmaker who is known as the "American Buñuel," and he is working on a sexually provocative drama about a brothel. Kingsley has his friends, actors, wannabe actresses and others join him on his estate in East Hampton, New York to audition for and work on his sexual drama. The twelve chapters in Maidstone are filmed in documentary form, and they depict Kingsley's everyday life as an actor and filmmaker. Kingsley refers to himself as a narcissist. Several attractive women are shown auditioning for a role in his film, and Kingsley is shown criticizing them heavily. He places himself within the film to show the actresses what he is looking for in his film. Kingsley is very realistic and convincing in his own acting. In addition to directing his film, he is also campaigning to become president and in doing so, he attracts journalists, scholars and some African-American radicals who question him about his campaign. Some of the attention that he draws leads to a group of people known as PAX,C discussing the need to have Kingsley assassinated.

=== Chapter One: A Meeting of High Officials ===
The film opens with a male voice presenting a series of newscasts by British commentator Jean Cardigan, who is known in England for the intimacy in her portraits of the great and the near-great. She is also described as "the sauciest bite in Britain." Next, Jean Cardigan appears and begins speaking about Norman T. Kingsley running for president. Her purpose is to keep a watch on Kingsley. The next scene is "The Meeting of High Officials," in which a group of people are sitting in a living room and listening to a man describe Kingsley. They say that his dominant nationality is Welsh, and that he went to different schools in pursuit of a degree in architecture. Kingsley is described as "indigenous, original, and a bit bizarre." The film then changes to a clip in which Kingsley begins auditioning women for his film. It then returns to the High Officials discussing Kingsley and his biography.

=== Chapter Two: The Director ===
Kingsley continues auditioning women and critiquing them heavily. He asks the women if they would be prepared to take off their clothes if the film called for it. At the same time, the High Officials provide psychoanalytic theories of Kingsley. They mention that Kingsley lives in New York, is separated from his wife Chula Mae and has had no contact with his five children. One official wants to know Kingsley's position on Red China, Soviet Russia, the new African states, Israel and the Arab states, presumably in reference to his presidential campaign. They introduce Mrs. Oswald, who works for Kingsley, because she knows the most about him. She claims that she knows as much about Kingsley as do everyone else. The High Officials mention the Buñuel movie, and then first mention assassination. The chapter concludes with a backyard boxing fight between Kingsley and Raoul Rey O'Houlihan. Kingsley demands not to be hit in his face because he will appear in his own film.

=== Chapter Three: PAX,C & Cash Box ===
Jean Cardigan talks about the new secret elite peace organization called Prevention of Assassination Experiments, Control (PAX,C). Cardigan says that she heard that PAX,C incites assassinations rather than prevents them. She was accused of being a member of the British equivalent of PAX,C, but she denies involvement. The scene changes back to the High Officials discussing the Cash Box. It is explained that Rey is Kingsley's half-brother. The scene changes back to Kingsley, who says that he is on top of the Cash Box and that Rey is right under him. A photographer takes pictures of the potential actresses, and then an older woman speaks with Kingsley about using her estate for filming.

=== Chapter Four: Instructions to the Cast ===
Kingsley speaks with his chosen film cast. He explains that the film is about a brothel in which men work to mate women. He explains the sexual nature of the film. The scene changes back and forth between two men fishing and Kingsley speaking to the cast.

=== Chapter Five: Politicking in the Grass ===
Chapter five is titled "Politicking in the Grass". It starts with the Cash Box members talking to each other. The scene changes to Ms. Cardigan talking about how Kingsley is receiving political delegations while he is making his "sex movie." She says that she saw one girl undress another while they were filming on the lawn of the estate, with the Cash Box to be seen in the open. She feels that a man running for president should not be associated with something like the Cash Box, and that the film shoot is chaotic. After that, Kingsley speaks to a group of black men about poverty and life. The men are convinced that Kingsley is merely seeking the black vote in his run for president. Then the president of the ladies' college appears and says that she does not want to have a myth in the presidential office, and asks Kingsley about his credentials as a candidate. An argument ensues between a few men, and a shirtless Kingsley is seen lying on a lawn, speaking to a woman about voting. Kingsley engages in a conversation about sexual freedom in America and someone who hangs himself while having an erection.

=== Chapter Six: A Commencement of Filming ===
The chapter begins with Kingsley and the cast clearing out a room to start filming. It transitions into a somewhat sexual scene between a male and a female who are presumably cast members of Kingsley's film. Kingsley is next shown speaking to a different female cast member. They discuss the type of men whom she prefers. She talks in depth about her sexual curiosity to be with a black man, stating "I heard they are good." Kingsley kisses her and they get into bed together. Kingsley is next shown talking to a different woman about an Irish poet who said, "The devil is the most beautiful creature God ever created." This is a paraphrase from John Milton's Paradise Lost. Next, Ms. Cardigan says that the latest bulletin from NTK sexual front is that "Ultraviolet," the star of Andy Warhol films, is going to appear in Kingsley's film having sex with a Black man. This is supposed to be a "cinematic first" for Kingsley. More conversation is shown with the cast members. Kingsley is then shown sexually caressing yet another female.

=== Chapter Seven: Portents ===
The High Officials discuss the manner in which they think Kingsley should be assassinated. A man from Kingsley's film is then shown making unusual whooping noises with his mouth.

=== Chapter Eight: Return of an Old Love ===
A man interrupts Kingsley to tell him that Valarie Bruenelle is at the estate. Kingsley says that the last time he saw her she was very "rapid." Kingsley meets with Bruenelle and they sit at a table smoking, talking and singing. Kingsley asks why Bruenelle came to see him and asks if it was to wish him well. Bruenelle says that she does not know if she wishes him well. Some photos are flashed across the screen showing Ms. Bruenell in her younger years.

=== Chapter Nine: The Death of A Director ===
With sexually induced female moaning in the background, a man is shown falling to the floor, and then a man is shown playing the piano. This chapter changes scenes quickly, in a random flashing manner, showing images of back roads, Ms. Cardigan, Kingsley, Kingsley's wife Chula Mae and children, the estate and other miscellaneous events. A sexual scene is shown with Kingsley speaking about his film becoming pornographic. The chapter then transitions into flashes of events occurring during Kingsley's presidential campaign. Several flashes of Kingsley and women are then shown, one with a fully nude woman. Kingsley says that his film is very close to sexual exploitation. Several more sex scenes are shown, one with Ms. Cardigan exposing her almost-bare chest as her dress is open and loose on top. Ms. Cardigan is shown very disheveled, in an almost demonic state, holding a baby doll and screaming, "I hate NTK!" The final scene shows several people walking down a dirt road, away from the camera.

=== Chapter Ten: The Grand Assassination Ball ===
The chapter opens with a party for Kingsley's presidential campaign. The High Officials and Chula Mae are in attendance. Two cast members say that the "king has been assassinated" and suddenly scream. Kingsley makes his way on stage, where he yells "Silence! The king is ready to speak!" He makes a speech about how much he trusts everyone who is there until they betray him for the first time. As the music continues to play, everyone is dancing and appears to be enjoying themselves, except for the High Officials, who look mad. One of the young black men from the cast tries to attack Kingsley. It takes several men to subdue him to the ground and to escort him out of the ball. After this, the music stops, Kingsley's brother walks up to his brother and yells out to the crowd, "Is my brother for freedom?", to which Chula Mae yells out, "Come on! Play some freedom! Play some freedom! You don't know nothing about freedom!" The scene ends by going completely black into the next scene, in which Chula Mae is sitting in his house smoking a cigarette.

=== Chapter Eleven: A Course in Orientation ===
This chapter begins with Kingsley entering his home where Chula Mae awaits him. He sits down and she angrily accuses him of getting "even" with her by not calling her into work. He discusses the actors with whom he worked during filming. Chula Mae says that he is afraid of real talent because it might steal something from him. The next scene shows Kingsley, Chula Mae, and their children on a sailboat in the ocean. A yard scene is then shown in which Kingsley is discussing the film with the cast and his crew. He says that they have made a film by a "brand-new process" that is akin to a military operation and that they have been making an attack on the nature of reality. He asks "What is reality?" The cast and crew begin to discuss Kingsley and the film. One of the females did not like the ball because she felt that since the cast trusted him, they had been "manipulated, exploited, developed and educated" by Kingsley. He says that he made the film to show how a man runs for president, and how his character as a complete contradiction with the actor himself. He says that in a fantasy world, his character could run for president. He and his cast and crew give a thankful round of applause to their host throughout the film, Robert Gardiner. The scene ends with the camera crew riding away from the house where the film was shot.

=== Chapter Twelve: The Silences of An Afternoon ===
The final chapter shows Chula Mae and the children walking on a dirt road and some other cast members walking around, relaxing because filming is complete. It then changes to a clip in which Rey grabs his hammer and carries it with him. Another short clip shows Rey talking to one of the High Officials, and then Rey suddenly attacks Kingsley with the hammer, saying that Kingsley must die but not Mailer. Kingsley and Rey both fall into the grass, wrestling. Kingsley says, "No baby, you trust me." He repeats this several times to calm his brother while his hands are pinned to the ground. Chula Mae starts screaming when she sees Kingsley on top of Rey, not because he is trying to hurt Rey, but because Rey tries to strangle Kingsley. Rey bites Kingsley's ear and draws blood. Chula Mae hits him and his children are crying. Rey then claims that the film required Kingsley's death. Rey then asks Kingsley why he thinks he returned, but Rey says that he doesn't need to come back. After the two brothers start walking up the dirt road, they call each other offensive names, and soon after Rey proclaims that everything that just happened was a scene from a "Hollywood whorehouse movie." The last scene shows the two dirt roads surrounded by woods.

== Cast ==
- Norman Mailer as Norman Kingsley
- Rip Torn as Raoul Rey O'Houlihan
- Joy Bang as Joy Broom
- Beverly Bentley as Chula Mae Kingsley
- Jean Campbell as Jean Cardigan
- Lee Cook as Lazarus
- Terrayne Crawford as Terry Crawford
- Buzz Farber as Luis
- Robert Gardiner as "Secret Service Chief"
- Leo Garen as "The Producer"
- Luba Harrington as "Russian Delegate"
- Isabelle Collin Dufresne as Ultra Violet

Other cast members:

- Paul Austin
- Ann Barry
- Eddie Bonette
- Steve Borton
- Robert Byrne
- Paul Carroll
- Lang Clay
- Harold Conrad
- Billy Copley
- John de Menil
- Tony Duke
- Tim Hickey
- Ron Hobbs
- Kahlil
- Evelyn Larson
- Robert Lucid
- Mara Lynn
- Diana MacKenzie
- John Maloon
- John Manazanet
- Michael McClure
- Carolyn McCullough
- David McMullin
- Penny Milford
- Glenna Moore
- Leonard Morris
- Adeline Naiman
- Ula Ness
- Alfonso Ossorio
- Noel E. Parmentel, Jr.
- Maggie Peach
- Alice Raintree
- Jack Richardson
- Joe Roddy
- Lee Roscoe
- Bianca Rosoff
- Peter Rosoff
- Barney Rosoff
- Shari Rothe
- Cliff Sager
- Lucy Saroyan
- Brenda Simley
- Lane Smith
- Sally Sorrell
- Greer St. John
- Carol Stevens
- Danae Tom
- José Torres
- Hervé Villechaize
- Jan Pieter Welt
- Bud Wirtschafter
- Harris Yulin

Justin Bozung points out that Mailer's determination to cast non-actors in Maidstone and other films supports his belief that "we are all actors in our daily lives." Mailer's determination to blur reality and fiction as scenarios unfold could only be achieved by capturing true responses to situations. Many of Mailer's casts were chosen from friends who "reflect facets of his persona."

== Production ==
=== Background ===
Produced during the media height of The Armies of the Night and leading to the writing of Miami and the Siege of Chicago, Maidstone was created during a politically and culturally changing era of American history. Although released in 1970-1971, Maidstone was produced just one month after the assassination of Robert Kennedy and three months after Martin Luther King, Jr.'s assassination. John D'Amico couples Maidstone with chants of "The whole world is watching!" on the American political timeline of the 1960s and along a year of "nerve-wracked" cinema "desperately grasping for a new way of living." D'Amico credits the totalitarian-littered world in which these filmmakers were born as fuel in their rage against the politically oppressive utilization of perfect order, considering these factors to be more important than the experimentation with illegal drugs which were also associated with counter-cultural film production.

=== Development ===
Maidstone is the final of three underground films written and directed by Norman Mailer in the late 1960s and was his largest production in terms of capital expenses and physical and emotional expenditures. The film began production in 1968 and was not completed until 1970. Production occurred over five days at various East Hampton estates, and "[t]he actors worked without a script, without a net, and often, without any idea what they were doing." Mailer relied on his own acting as a method of directing while prodding cast members to react on film rather than reading from a script. Conservative commentator William F. Buckley Jr. was offered but declined a small role in the film.

The original footage was 45 hours long, but after the editing process the producers came up with a 110-minute film. It took them three weeks to watch the 45 hours of film, then about six months to cut it into 7.5 hours. According to Mailer, the crew worked a long time before they could get down to the 3.5-hour version, which no longer exists. "At that point, down from 7 ½ hours, it's a totally different film. It was endlessly long and slow and had all sorts of interesting corners, pursued all sorts of angles, that never quite got developed enough."

In 1971, Mailer published the screenplay (from the transcript of the finished movie), along with accounts of the filming, film stills, and his essay “A Course in Filmmaking”.

Mailer pointed to his lack of experience as an inadvertent film producer as the main factor for inflated spending on his films Wild 90, Beyond the Law and Maidstone. The film cost $200,000 to produce, causing Mailer to sell part of his interest in The Village Voice. The film would eventually bankrupt Mailer before completion.

=== Filming location ===
Four estates in The Hamptons were rented, providing five continuous miles of estate to five different camera teams. Barney Rosset let the crew use his estate for shooting, and a woman named Elizabeth Brackman also gave the film crew permission to use her house as the shooting scene. A mansion used in one of the scenes belonged to Alfonso Ossorio. The crew worked "from mansion to estate back to another mansion to an island." Along with a cast of 50-60 individuals, cameramen were advised to follow unprompted actions for Mailer to piece together in production.

=== Music ===
There is no official soundtrack for the film, but it did use scores created by composers Isaac Hayes and Wes Montgomery. The theme music was composed and sung by Carol Stevens.

Performed by Isaac Hayes:

- "Precious, Precious"
- "I Just Want to Make Love to You"
- "Rock Me Baby"

Performed by Wes Montgomery:

- "Love Theme from The Sandpiper (The Shadow of Your Smile)"

== Themes ==
Filmmaker Michael Mailer, Norman Mailer's son, credits Maidstone as a sociological statement and an embodiment of the "indulgence to the point of mental hazard" that ultimately caused the 1960s to "implode."

The character of Norman Kingsley was based on Robert F. Kennedy as the next "cool" political candidate. According to Sarah Bishop, Maidstone's purpose was to "demonstrate the violence" caused by media representations of individuals who had the cultural authority and technological power to shape these representations. Driven by the assassinations of the 1960s, Maidstone serves as a test of counterculture's promised political equality and social freedoms' ability to "hold up under the spotlights."

=== Feminist response ===
Mailer's director character Kingsley was considered a male chauvinist. At one point in the film, referring to his ability to analyze women, Kingsley says, "I wish women were horses. I would be a multi-millionaire." His take on the Hollywood casting couch portrayed a director conducting cruel interviews with women. Lines were sometimes blurred between his character and Mailer himself, so he received much scorn from supporters of the women's movement in the 1970s. "In Maidstone, all the interviews are with women and each is crueler than the next. I paid for that for 40 years," said Mailer. "The women's movement picked it up as if it were manna from heaven. They had found their number-one sexist pig in America." Mailer viewed feminism as "potentially, part of the drift toward totalitarianism," which inspired the book The Prisoner of Sex, which he wrote as a response to the movement. Additionally, during a town hall meeting hosted by a group of feminists, Mailer stated that "the whole question of women's liberation is the deepest question that faces us."

John D'Amico references "Chapter Four: Instructions to the Cast" to illustrate the treatment of actresses as "needling and taunting," as Mailer's character Kingsley calls one woman a "ninny" if she refuses to strip for a scene. In addition to nitpicking over one actress' wrinkles, Kingsley makes racist remarks toward a Black actress by demanding that she "be a slave to be a good actor."

== Release ==
An early edit was previewed at the Whitney Museum in New York. The film ran for two weeks, five times a day, and sold about 7,000 tickets, breaking several house records for the theater. With some extra money in the bank, and feeling optimistic about its reception, Mailer opened the film at The Lincoln on 57th Street. It ran for seven days, and delivered the worst business in the history of the theater. A friend with film expertise commented on its poor performance: "Norman, the answer is that there were just 7,000 people in New York who were interested in seeing that film."

Maidstone was shown in a select few theaters in 1971. After that, it all but disappeared from the public eye until 35 years later when a DVD was released in France in 2006. This led to a number of public screenings at that time, but until then the film remained in obscurity. These limited screenings may have lessened its potential direct influence on future films.

The film has been shown at several festivals and movie theaters since its first release. In 2008, it appeared during the film festival "Cinema '68" in the UK. Five years later, it was shown in New York at the Film Forum.

== Reception ==
According to Mailer, Maidstone never received "the one great review we were hoping for."

Vincent Canby of The New York Times lauded Mailer's creativity and ambition, but his review remained negative:

Maidstone is a sometimes hilarious, often boring, but always adventurous ego trip, a very expensive, 110-minute home movie that has been edited, rather fancily, out of something like 45 hours of original footage. That, in turn, prompts the thought that almost anybody should be able to get 110 minutes of something out of 45 hours of anything, even if it's simply the filmed record of a chic, chaotic, seven-day brawl in East Hampton, which is the raw, not-so-base material of Maidstone.

Like many viewers, he found the Raoul Ray O'Houlihan (Rip Torn) hammer attack scene to be the only intriguing moment:

Nothing else in Maidstone is as interesting, not the satire of the news media, not the soft-core sex scenes, not Mailer's put-downs of actresses auditioning for Norman T. Kingsley ... not even Mailer's flights of fancy about politics, Presidents, blacks and whatnots.

Sam Adams of the Los Angeles Times calls the Rey/Kingsley fight "the greatest scene in Norman Mailer's filming career" and states that "watching the film doesn't lack for force. It is indeed like being attacked, and it is Mailer that is doing the attacking."

== Legacy ==
A screenshot from the improvised fight scene from Maidstone. It shows Rip Torn (right) with a hammer pushing director Norman Mailer

The film is now famous for the improvised fight between Mailer and Torn. As the camera rolled, Torn struck Mailer in the head with a hammer, intending to "kill his character." Mailer's scalp opened up, and a vicious fight ensued. With the camera still rolling, Torn energetically strangled Mailer until the fight was broken up by Mailer's wife Beverly Bentley and their wailing children. During the melee, Mailer bit off a small chunk of Torn's ear. The fight, in which the actors called each other by their real names, made it into the film.

The fight was later used as evidence in Torn's case against Dennis Hopper, who claimed that Torn attacked him with a knife after being replaced by Jack Nicholson in Easy Rider. Torn won his case on the claim that "he could not have possibly killed Hopper as he was, at the time, on the set of Maidstone trying to kill Norman Mailer." In his essay "Overexposed: My First Taste of Film-Making", Michael Mailer recounts this final scene as his first experience with trauma. Shortly before Norman Mailer's death, he spoke with his son about the final scene of Maidstone and its impact as the "clear" force that drove Michael into the film business.

== See also ==
- List of American films of 1970
- Independent drama film
