= Patty Jenkins' unrealized projects =

During her long career, American filmmaker Patty Jenkins has worked on several projects which never progressed beyond the pre-production stage under her direction. Some of these projects fell in development hell, were officially canceled, were in development limbo or would see life under a different production team.

== 2000s ==
=== Untitled Chuck Yeager biopic ===
Following the success of her first film Monster (2003), Jenkins was approached by Chuck Yeager to direct a film of his life story. Jenkins opted to develop the project as an independent film rather than as a studio venture and it eventually fell apart as result.

=== I Am Superman ===
In the mid-2000s, Jenkins was set to team with Ryan Gosling for an indie drama film, I Am Superman. However, the film was put on hold after her son was born. As of 2017, Jenkins still hoped to make the film with Gosling.

=== Untitled ghost story TV series ===
In the late 2000s, Jenkins was set to direct the pilot episode of a ghost story series for AMC, but it wasn’t picked up.

== 2010s ==
=== Exposed TV series ===
On February 9, 2014, Jenkins was set to direct the pilot episode of Charles Randolph’s journalism drama series Exposed, with Mary Elizabeth Winstead, Ben Barnes, Pedro Pascal, Sandrine Holt, & Brían F. O'Byrne set to star, and Jean-Baptiste Babin, Joel Thibout and David Atlan-Jackson producing the series through their company Backup Films to air on ABC.

=== Sweetheart ===
On May 8, 2014, Jenkins was set to direct Jack Stanley’s screenplay Sweetheart with Michael Costigan and Jewerl Ross producing the film.

=== Jackpot remake ===
On November 17, 2014, Jenkins was set to direct the American film adaptation of the Norwegian action-comedy film Jackpot, with David Callaham set to write the screenplay and Will Gluck producing the film for Focus Features. On May 5, 2016, it was announced that Gluck was now set to direct due to Jenkins' involvement with Wonder Woman, with Mila Kunis and Bryan Cranston set to star and Jennifer Garner in talks to join the cast.

== 2020s ==
=== Cleopatra ===
On October 11, 2020, Jenkins was set to direct a Laeta Kalogridis-scripted historical drama about Cleopatra, with Gal Gadot set to star; Gadot and Jenkins would also produce alongside Jason Varano and Charles Roven for Paramount Pictures. On December 6, 2021, it was announced that Kari Skogland had taken over the project as director owing to Jenkins' commitments to a third Wonder Woman film and Star Wars: Rogue Squadron, with Jenkins remaining involved as a producer. On June 17, 2022, it was announced that the project would no longer be moving forward at Paramount, and that Universal Pictures was circling the project.

=== Rogue Squadron ===
On December 10, 2020, Lucasfilm president Kathleen Kennedy announced that Jenkins would direct the next Star Wars film, titled Rogue Squadron. She agreed to direct the project due to its focus on starfighter pilots, as her father was a fighter pilot for the United States Air Force and she had always wanted to make "the greatest fighter pilot movie of all time". At the time of the film's announcement, Jenkins revealed that she had been working on it with an unannounced writer for around six months, and they had almost finished a treatment for the film. Matthew Robinson was revealed as the writer in June 2021, and Jenkins said a month later that they were finishing the script and beginning to hire crew members. She noted that she was "fairly free" to tell the story that she wanted to tell, but the development process for the film involved a lot of consultation with Lucasfilm to ensure that it aligned narratively and visually with previous and upcoming Star Wars projects. Pre-production was initially scheduled to begin in late 2021 ahead of a filming start in early 2022, but production for the film was indefinitely delayed by November 2021 due Jenkins' work on a planned sequel to Wonder Woman 1984.

In May 2022, Rogue Squadron was expected to come after a different planned Star Wars film from Taika Waititi. The film was then removed from Disney's release schedule that September. In early December that year, Wonder Woman 3 was cancelled. Jenkins explained that when she left Rogue Squadron to focus on Wonder Woman 3, Lucasfilm had asked her to consider returning to the project once she was free, ultimately starting a new deal for her to continue developing it. The film was reportedly no longer in active development by March 2023. At Star Wars Celebration London the next month, Kennedy said Lucasfilm was still discussing the project as a potential future film or series. In March 2024, Jenkins said her new deal to develop Rogue Squadron was finalized in early 2023 but further work on the film was delayed by the 2023 Writers Guild of America strike. She now owed Lucasfilm a new draft of the script. Jenkins noted that Lucasfilm had begun work on other Star Wars film projects and she was unsure if Rogue Squadron would end up happening.

=== Untitled Lego film ===
In October 2024, three live-action Lego films were announced as being in development at Universal Pictures; one of which was being developed to be directed by Jenkins from a script she co-wrote with Geoff Johns. Jenkins also was set to produce through Wicious Pictures alongside Jill Wilfert and Ryan Christians at The Lego Group.

== Offers ==
=== Fifty Shades of Grey ===
On May 9, 2013, Jenkins was offered to direct the feature film adaptation of E. L. James' novel Fifty Shades of Grey, as well as the sequels, for Universal Pictures long before Sam Taylor-Johnson was hired.
