= Beverly Bentley =

American actress (1930–2018)

- Bentley in The Price Is Right, 1956
- Born: Beverley Claire Rentz; February 26, 1930; Atlanta, Georgia, U.S.
- Died: September 13, 2018 (aged 88); Provincetown, Massachusetts, U.S.
- Occupation: Actress
- Spouse: Norman Mailer (m. 1963; div. 1980)
- Children: Michael Mailer; Stephen Mailer

Beverly Bentley (February 26, 1930 – September 13, 2018) was an American actress. Her career began during the Golden Age of Television in the 1950s and continued on stage and in film into the first decade of the 21st century.

== Background ==
Born Beverly Claire Rentz in Atlanta, Georgia, her parents divorced when she was young, and she moved with her mother to Florida. She studied drama at Sarasota High School, but was forced to leave school at age 16 to move again to Pensacola. It was there while working in a diner that she met entertainer Arthur Godfrey, who was a Reservist at a nearby naval station.

== Career ==
Rentz later moved to New York City and searched for Godfrey. He asked her to appear regularly on his show, where she became a "Little Godfrey" who held up signs for commercials. Godfrey introduced her as "Beverly Bentley", because he thought the name "sounds better". She then changed her name professionally.

She briefly married advertising executive Alex Mumford and worked as hostess and fashion commentator on several TV game shows, such as Beat the Clock, The Big Payoff, and The Price Is Right. She also worked as a "hand model" for perfume commercials, had been to Ernest Hemingway's birthday party in Spain, and had celebrity boyfriends, including Orson Bean, Eddie Fisher, Andy Griffith, and Miles Davis. In due time, she had her first off-Broadway role as Connie Bliss in Clifford Odets' The Big Knife, in which she starred opposite James Earl Jones.

With director Leo Garen, Bentley founded Act IV in Provincetown, a small theater company that staged plays by Pirandello, LeRoi Jones, and other ambitious writers with new talents like Al Pacino and Jill Clayburgh. In 1966, Bentley played Lulu in Act IV's production of "The Deer Park", a play based on Mailer's novel of the same name. After appearing in the 1960 film Scent of Mystery, she had her first lead role on Broadway in The Heroine. Additional productions included Romanoff and Juliet, The Lovers, and numerous off-Broadway shows.

Her film credits include A Face in the Crowd (1957); husband Norman Mailer's trilogy Wild 90 (1968), Beyond the Law (1968), and Maidstone (1970); the cult horror film, C.H.U.D. (1984); and The Golden Boys (2008). Her son Michael Mailer explains that she refused to sign a contract in Hollywood, as she never wanted to be pinned down. Bentley's first love was theater.

"She acted for half a century on stage, screen and film", said Mailer's official biographer J. Michael Lennon: "She was well-known in New York City. She was well-known on Cape Cod".

== Personal life ==
Bentley had a relationship with Miles Davis for several years in the late 1950s. She met Norman Mailer shortly after her Broadway debut in 1963 and they married later that year. It was a tumultuous marriage. They became estranged in 1969 and divorced in 1980. There were two sons, Stephen and Michael. Although she worked professionally with Mailer on several movies, he tended to be "ruthlessly critical" of her acting. Her most prominent moment in a Mailer film may have been her part in the climactic fight scene of Maidstone. According to her son Michael, her life's two joys were her family and the theater.

Since 1966, Bentley lived in Provincetown, Massachusetts. She died at age 88 on September 13, 2018.
