= History of the Jews in Minsk =

The history of the Jewish community in Minsk, present-day capital of Belarus, spans more than six centuries. From the early modern period onward, Minsk emerged as one of the principal centres of Jewish life in Eastern Europe and formed part of the wider Litvak cultural and religious region. Under the Russian Empire and later the Soviet Union, the Jewish population of Minsk participated extensively in commerce, industry, religious scholarship, and political activism. The city was associated with the Mitnaggedim, the Bund, and the development of early Zionism.

== Early foundations (15th - 18th centuries) ==
The first documented presence of Jews in Minsk goes back to the 15th century, when the Grand Duchy of Lithuania began relying on Jewish entrepreneurs for customs and tax management. In 1441, Grand Duke Casimir IV Jagiellon granted the town specific trading privileges, and by 1489, Jewish merchants from Troki, such as Michał Danilewicz, were already leasing customs duties.

Although the community faced a temporary expulsion in 1495, they were permitted to return in 1503. Over the next two centuries, royal charters from kings such as Stephen Báthory (1579) and John III Sobieski (1679) confirmed Jewish rights to own property, open shops, and maintain synagogues and cemeteries. By 1685, the city first stone yeshiva had been established, marking Minsk as a rising centre for Jewish education.

== Russian Imperial Era ==
Following the Partitions of Poland, Minsk was incorporated into the Russian Empire in 1793. As the capital of the Minsk Governorate, it fell within the Pale of Settlement, leading to demographic growth.

Jewish Population Growth in Minsk
Year	Jewish Population	Percentage of Total
1802	2,675	N/A
1847	12,976	N/A
1897	47,562	52.3%
1917	67,000	N/A

During the 19th century, Jews dominated the local trade in grain and timber, reaching an 88% share of local commerce by the 1880s. The community was also involved in civic life. For instance, the city fire station (opened in 1885) was funded by the Jewish community and staffed largely by Jewish volunteer firefighters.

== Spiritual and political movements ==
Minsk was an important centre of the Mitnaggedim, the Jewish religious movement opposed to Hasidism. One of the best-known religious institutions in the city was "Blumke's Kloyz". In the late 19th century, the community was led by Rabbi Yerucham Yehuda Leib Perelman, known as the "Gadol of Minsk".

Minsk was also a centre of Jewish political movements. The General Jewish Labour Bund held its founding congress in Minsk in 1897, and the city served as its first headquarters. In 1902, Minsk hosted the Second Conference of Russian Zionists with official government permission.

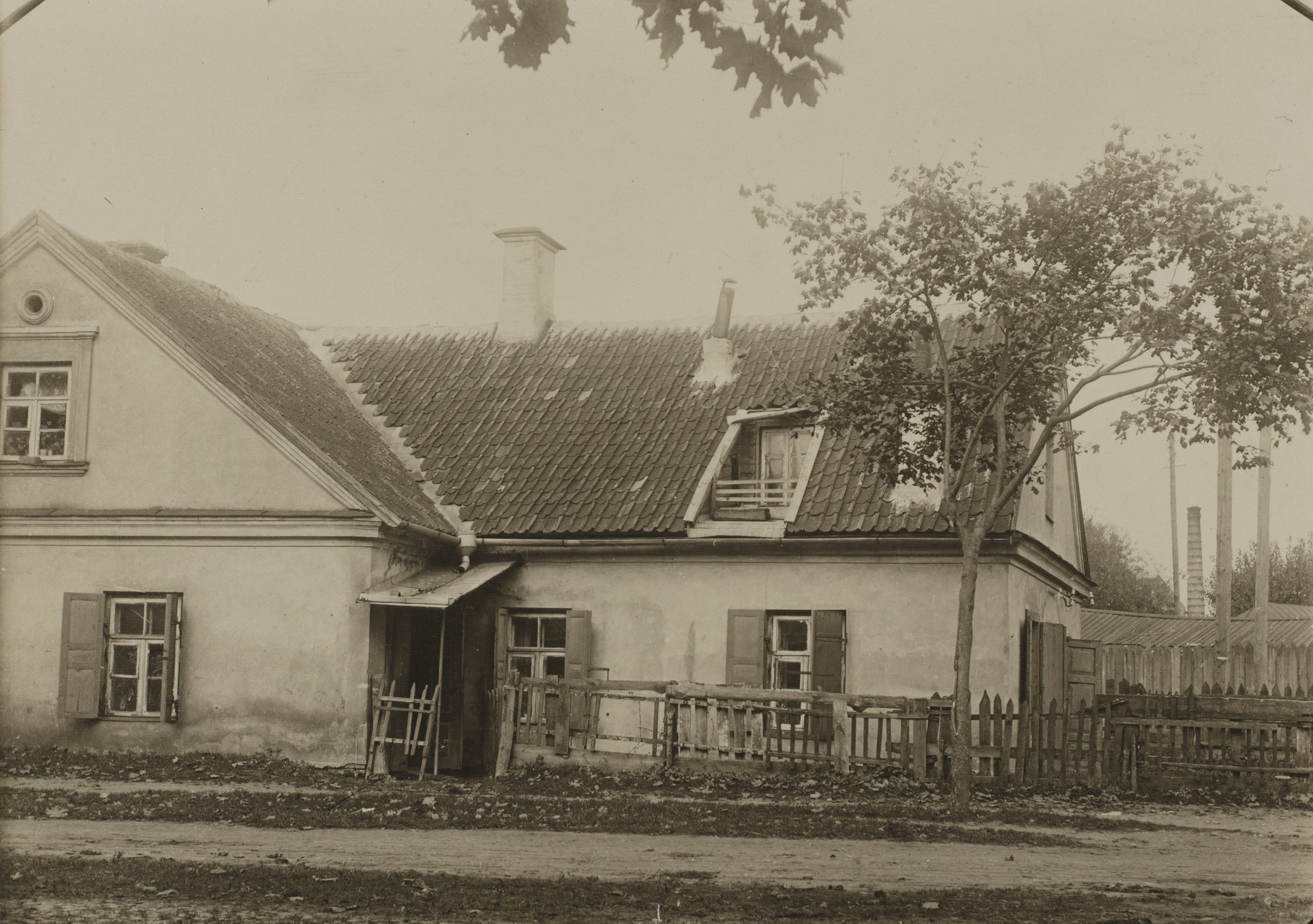
The house in Vilna where the Bund was founded

== The Soviet Era and Yiddish Culture ==
After the 1917 Revolution, Yiddish became one of the four official languages of the Byelorussian Soviet Socialist Republic.

Minsk emerged as a global hub for secular Yiddish culture. The Jewish Section of the Institute of Belarusian Culture (InBelKult) employed leading writers like Moyshe Kulbak and Izi Kharik. The Belarusian State Yiddish Theatre (BelGOSET) was established in 1926 in a building that had formerly been a synagogue.

But this cultural flowering was cut short by the Great Purge (1937-1938). Kulbak and Kharik were executed by Stalin secret police. In June 1941, the Yiddish poet Zelik Axelrod was executed by Soviet authorities just before the German occupation.

== The Holocaust (1941-1944) ==
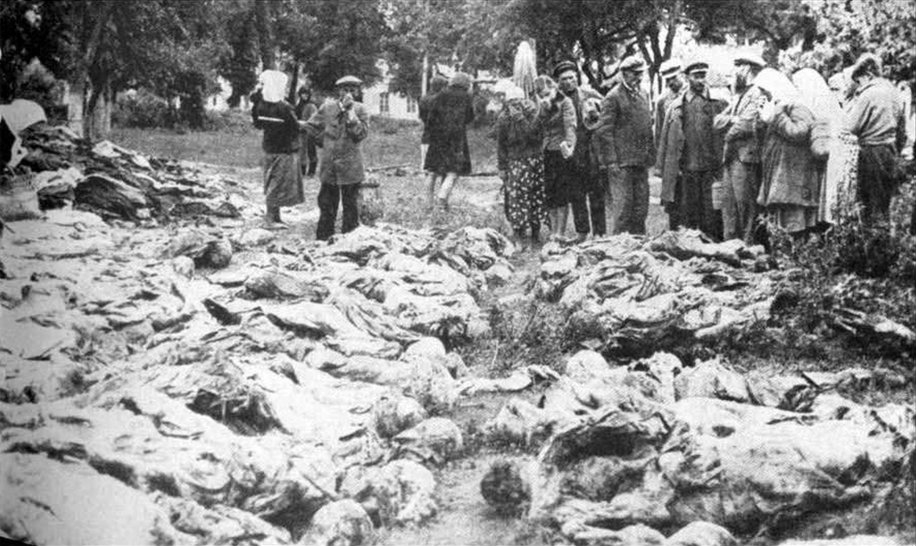
Residents searching the exhumed victims of the Vinnytsia massacre, 1943

Following the German invasion in June 1941, the Minsk Ghetto was established, eventually confining approximately 100,000 Jews. Mass killings were carried out by the Nazi occupiers at the Yama (the Pit) and Maly Trostenets extermination camp. The Minsk Ghetto developed an underground resistance movement during the German occupation. Ilya Mushkin, leader of the Judenrat, assisted resistance members by helping smuggle weapons and fugitives into the surrounding forests. Approximately 10,000 Jews escaped from the ghetto and joined Soviet partisan formations, with about half surviving the war.

== Post-war period and the Refusenik movement ==
When Minsk was liberated in 1944, about 5,000 Jewish survivors remained in the city. In the post-war period, Jewish religious activity was restricted by Soviet authorities, including the Council for the Affairs of Religious Cults (CARC).

During the 1970s, Minsk became one of the centres of the Refusenik movement in the Soviet Union. One of its leading figures was Colonel Yefim Davidovich, a Soviet war veteran who campaigned for the right of Jews to emigrate to Israel. After publicly supporting Jewish emigration, he was stripped of his military rank and subjected to harassment by the KGB. Davidovich died in 1976 following several heart attacks and was later reburied on the Mount of Olives in Jerusalem.

== Contemporary community ==
Following the dissolution of the Soviet Union in 1991, many Jews from Minsk emigrated to Israel, the United States, and Germany. An estimated 40,000 Jews currently live in Belarus. Jewish religious and community institutions in Minsk include the Minsk Main Synagogue, located on Daumana Street and built in 1913, and the Chabad Centre on Kropotkina Street.

== See also ==
- Jewish Autonomous Oblast (for broader Soviet Yiddish context)
