= Stephen Mailer =

American stage and screen actor (born 1966)

- Born: Stephen McLeod Mailer; March 10, 1966 (age 60); New York City, New York, U.S.
- Occupation: Actor
- Years active: 1982–present
- Spouses: Visnja Rodic Clayton; Lindsay Marx; Elizabeth Rainer (m. 2010)
- Children: 2
- Parent(s): Norman Mailer; Beverly Bentley
- Relatives: Michael Mailer (brother); Susan Mailer (half-sister); Kate Mailer (half-sister); John Buffalo Mailer (half-brother)

Stephen McLeod Mailer (born March 10, 1966) is an American stage and screen actor.

== Early life ==
Mailer was born in New York City, the son of novelist Norman Mailer (of Jewish origin) and stage actress Beverly Bentley.

== Career ==
Mailer's credits include appearances in films like Cry-Baby, Baby Mama, and Another Woman and the television shows Gilmore Girls, Law & Order: Special Victims Unit, and A League of Their Own.

== Personal life ==
Mailer was married to fashion designer and film director Visnja Rodic Clayton then to producer Lindsay Marx. He married Elizabeth Rainer in 2010 and he has two children, Cal and Teddy.

== Filmography ==
=== Film ===
Year	Title	Role	Notes
1985	War and Love	Sevek	
1988	Another Woman	Young Paul	
1990	Cry-Baby	Baldwin	
1990	Reversal of Fortune	Elon Dershowitz	
1992	A League of Their Own	Kit's Guy in Bar	
1994	Getting In	Gabriel Higgs	
1997	Red Meat	Chris	
1997	Quiet Days in Hollywood	Patrick	
1999	24 Nights	Keith	
1999	Ride with the Devil	Babe Hudspeth	
2006	Kettle of Fish	Band Leader	
2008	Baby Mama	Dan	
2008	Che	Paul Niven	
2008	The Golden Boys	Squealer Wixon	
2010	Jack Goes Boating	Happy Husband	
2010	Rabbit Hole	Kevin	
2010	Last Night	Client #1	
2012	What Maisie Knew	Zoe's Father	
2013	Louder Than Words	Lobbyist	
2014	Friends and Romans	Principal Patten	
2016	Blind	Arnold	
2017	The Post	Exchange President	
2019	The Irishman	F. Emmett Fitzpatrick	

=== Television ===
Year	Title	Role	Notes
1982	CBS Library	T.J.	Episode: "Robbers, Rooftops and Witches"
1987	ABC Afterschool Special	Mickey Sherman	Episode: "Divorced Kids' Blues"
1989, 1991	American Playhouse	Leo Spitzer / Ben	2 episodes
1990	H.E.L.P.	Rolfe	Episode: "The Children's Hour"
1991	Law & Order	Greg Jarmon	Episode: "The Serpent's Tooth"
1991	Darrow	Paul Darrow	Television film
1993	A League of Their Own	Steve	Episode: "The Fat Boys of Summer"
1992	Crossroads	Buddy	Episode: "The Nickel Curve"
2003	Law & Order: Special Victims Unit	Mr. McGuire	Episode: "Desperate"
2004	Gilmore Girls	Josh Davies	Episode: "Norman Mailer, I'm Pregnant!"
2007	As the World Turns	Dr. Cutler	7 episodes
2011	Unforgettable	Brett Langley	Episode: "Check Out Time"
2013	Deception	Seabrook	Episode: "Stay With Me"
