= Litwak =

Litwak is a surname, a variant of Litvak

- Leo E. Litwak (1924-2018), American writer
- Robert Litwak (born 1953), American scholar

== Fictional characters ==
- Mr. Litwak from Wreck-It Ralph, a Disney media franchise
