= Daniel Adams (director) =

Anglo-American film director

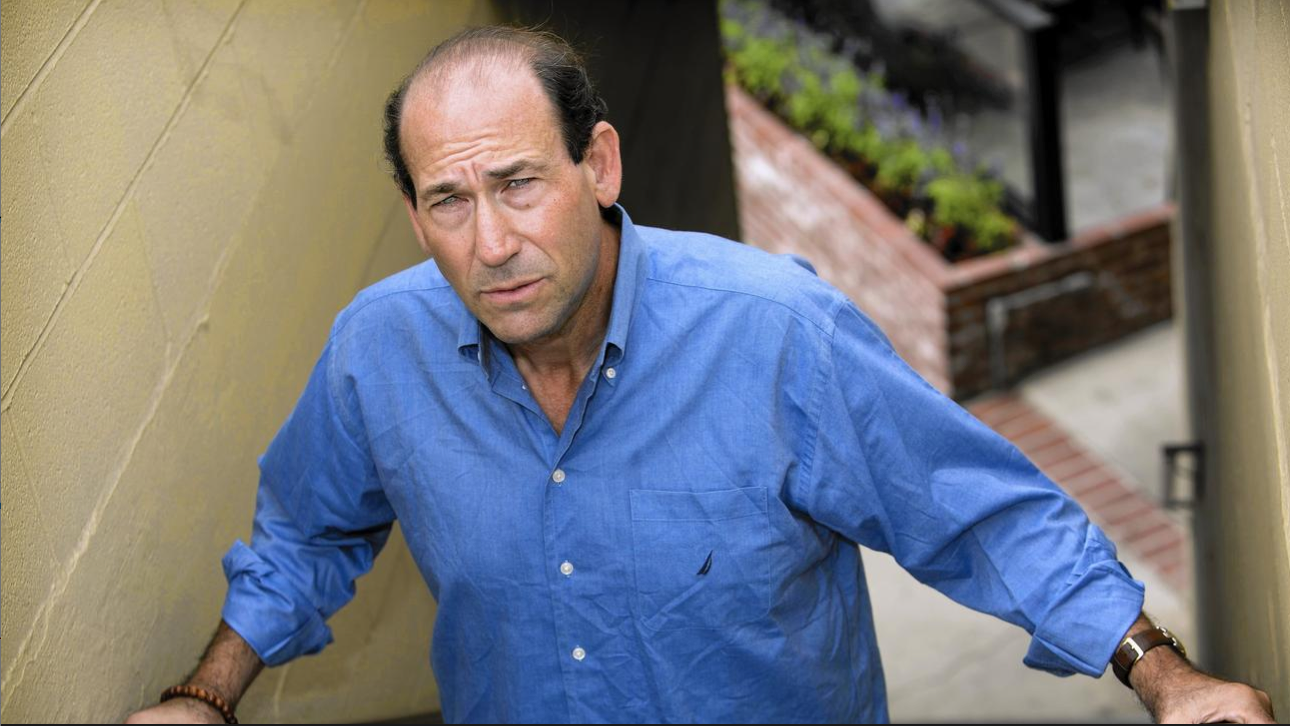
- Adams in 2014
- Born: Daniel R. Adams; 1961 (age 64–65); Boston, Massachusetts, US
- Education: University of Vermont, Harvard University
- Occupation: Film director

Daniel R. Adams (born 1961) is an American feature film director. He is best known for directing and writing the films The Lightkeepers, starring Richard Dreyfuss and Blythe Danner, and The Golden Boys, starring David Carradine, Bruce Dern, Rip Torn, Charles Durning, and Mariel Hemingway.

== Biography ==
Adams grew up in the Boston area. He attended the University of Vermont in 1980 to 1981 as well as some Harvard Extension School classes in the early 1980s. He worked for several political campaigns including two gubernatorial campaigns, a race for attorney general, and a presidential campaign. He directed television commercials for a Boston advertising agency and went into producing feature films in 1989.

He is a proponent of shooting film rather than digital.

=== Legal problems ===
In December 2011 Adams was indicted on 10 counts of making false tax claims related to two movies he directed, The Golden Boys and The Lightkeepers, for which his production company received $4.7 million in tax credits from the state of Massachusetts. On April 19, 2012, he pleaded guilty, served 21 months in prison, and was sentenced to 10 years probation.

In February 2019, the SEC claimed Adams and his business partner, Michael Flanders, had defrauded investors in connection with the film An L.A. Minute. According to the SEC a fictitious wire transfer confirmation and signature page, forged by Adams, was sent by Flanders to an investor to create the false appearance that investments had already been made in the film. The final judgment, against Adams, was issued in December 2019, ordering him to pay $50,562 plus prejudgment interest of $7,087 and a $50,562 civil penalty. In May 2020 Flanders was ordered to pay $28,500 plus prejudgment interest of $4,354 and a $28,500 civil penalty. Their production companies, Spiderworx Media LLC and An L.A. Minute LLC, were also penalized.

Adams gave a lengthy interview in which he described his regret regarding his legal issues, as well as the extenuating circumstances and why both issues are related, on the Brent Weinbach podcast "Pointed Questions."

== Film career ==
Adams gained film production experience from directing television commercials for a Boston advertising agency. He co-wrote and directed his first feature film in 1989, A Fool and His Money (originally titled, Religion, Inc.), which starred Sandra Bullock (Adams cast Ms. Bullock in her first leading role), Jonathan Penner, George Plimpton and Jerzy Kosinski (released through Trimark Pictures - now Lions Gate). He then went on to write and direct his second feature, Primary Motive, which starred Judd Nelson, Justine Bateman, Richard Jordan, John Savage and Sally Kirkland, for Twentieth Century Fox. His third feature, which he also wrote and directed, was a comedy entitled, The Mouse, starring Rip Torn and John Savage, and released through Strand Releasing. His film, The Golden Boys, was released through Roadside Attractions and Lions Gate Films in 2009.

Also in 2009, he directed the feature film, The Lightkeepers, from a script he wrote that is based on the story The Woman Haters: A Yarn of Eastboro Twin-Lights (1911) by Joseph C. Lincoln. The film, starring Richard Dreyfuss and Blythe Danner, was released through New Films Cinema in the spring of 2010. It was chosen as the closing night film for the Palm Springs International Film Festival, and was the opening night film for the Boulder International Film Festival, won the "Golden Angel" award (best picture) and chosen closing night film at the Los Angeles Chinese-American Film Festival, was named the No. 2 Best Grown Up Love Story of the Year (2010) by AARP Magazine, and won the 2010 "best musical score for a comedy" award by the International Film Music Critics Association. Two-time Academy Award nominated actor Bruce Dern has compared Adams' directing style to Hal Ashby and Alfred Hitchcock, and commented, "He (Adams) is on the threshold of becoming an extremely interesting commodity in this business because he's really old-school - he's an old-school filmmaker." And Academy Award-winning actor Richard Dreyfuss has been quoted, "Daniel is a smart man, who truly understands the old values of filmmaking... He is an excellent writer and perhaps enough people will see The Lightkeepers to appreciate that." Adams directed the film An L.A. Minute which he co-wrote with National Lampoon alum Larry "Ratso" Sloman. The film was released in theaters in the summer of 2018 through Strand Releasing but made just $5,004 at the box office. Adams co-wrote and directed the period drama film The Walk starring Justin Chatwin, Terrence Howard, Malcolm McDowell and Jeremy Piven. "The Walk" has won numerous "Best Picture" and "Best Director" film festival awards. The Walk was released in theaters in the United States through Vertical Entertainment on June 10, 2022 His latest film, "The Panic" is a period drama based on a true story set in 1907 New York about real-life bankers J. P. Morgan and Charles Barney as they grapple with a financial crisis sparked by Barney’s failed attempt to manipulate the copper market. The Panic stars Cary Elwes, Malcolm McDowell, Justin Chatwin, Colm Meaney, Cristiana Dell'Anna and Anastasiya Mitrunen and is set for a theatrical release in mid-2026 through Blue Fox Entertainment.

== Filmography ==
Year	Title	Director	Writer	Producer	Notes	Ref.
1989	A Fool and His Money	Yes	Yes	No	co-written with Michael Mailer	
1992	Primary Motive	Yes	Yes	No	co-written with William Snowden	
1996	The Mouse	Yes	Yes	No		
2008	The Golden Boys	Yes	Yes	Yes	based on the novel Cap’n Eri by Joseph C. Lincoln	
2009	The Lightkeepers	Yes	Yes	No	based on the novel The Woman Haters: A Yarn of Eastboro Twin-Lights by Joseph C. Lincoln	
2018	An L.A. Minute	Yes	Yes	No	co-written with Larry Sloman	
2022	Panama	No	Yes	No	co-written with William Barber	
2022	The Walk	Yes	Yes	No	co-written with George Powell	
2025	The Panic	Yes	Yes	No		
