= The Lightkeepers =

2009 film by Daniel Adams

- Directed by: Daniel Adams
- Written by: Daniel Adams
- Produced by: Penelope L. Foster; Larry Frenzel
- Starring: Richard Dreyfuss; Bruce Dern; Blythe Danner; Mamie Gummer; Tom Wisdom; Julie Harris
- Cinematography: Tom Jewett
- Edited by: Dean Goodhill
- Music by: Pinar Toprak
- Release date: December 18, 2009
- Running time: 97 minutes
- Country: United States
- Language: English
- Box office: $32,307

The Lightkeepers is a 2009 American romantic comedy film written and directed by Daniel Adams, and stars Richard Dreyfuss, Blythe Danner, Bruce Dern, Mamie Gummer, Tom Wisdom and Julie Harris in her final film role. Zana Messia wrote the film's theme song.

In a two-week period beginning on Christmas 2009, the film earned $32,307 on a single screen.

== Plot ==
The film is set on Cape Cod, Massachusetts, in 1912 and follows the story of two lighthouse attendants, one young and one old, who swear to abstain from women, until two women arrive for their summer vacation.

It is based upon The Woman Haters: A Yarn of Eastboro Twin-Lights (1911) by Joseph C. Lincoln.

== Cast ==
- Richard Dreyfuss as Seth Atkins / Bascom
- Bruce Dern as Bernie
- Blythe Danner as Mrs. Bascom
- Mamie Gummer as Ruth
- Tom Wisdom as John Brown / Russell Brooks
- Julie Harris as Mrs. Deacon
- Stephen Russell as Jedidiah Snow
- Jason Alan Smith as Ezra
- Ben Dreyfuss as Grocery Boy
- Theodora Greece as Impressed Lady

== Reception ==
On the review aggregator website Rotten Tomatoes, 20% of 5 critics' reviews are positive. Metacritic, which uses a weighted average, assigned the film a score of 41 out of 100, based on 4 critics, indicating "mixed or average" reviews.
