= The Golden Boys =

- Directed by: Daniel Adams
- Written by: Daniel Adams; Joseph C. Lincoln
- Produced by: Howard Katz; Michael Mailer; Matt Janes
- Starring: David Carradine; Bruce Dern; Mariel Hemingway; Rip Torn
- Cinematography: Philip Schwartz
- Edited by: Stan Cole; Susan Graef
- Music by: Jonathan Edwards
- Distributed by: Roadside Attractions
- Release dates: November 16, 2008 (Dennis, MA premiere); April 17, 2009 (United States)
- Country: United States
- Box office: $43,600

The Golden Boys is a romantic comedy, set on Cape Cod in 1905, about three 70-year-old retired sea captains who try to lure an attractive middle-aged woman into marriage. Developed under the working title Chatham, the film is an adaptation of the Joseph Lincoln novel Cap’n Eri and was released by Roadside Attractions on April 17, 2009.

== Plot ==
A romantic comedy, set on Cape Cod in 1905, about three 70-year-old retired sea captains who try to lure an attractive, middle-aged woman into marriage.

== Cast ==
- David Carradine as Captain Zebulon "Zeb" Hedge
- Rip Torn as Captain Jeremiah "Jerry" Burgess
- Bruce Dern as Captain Perez Ryder
- Mariel Hemingway as Martha Snow
- Charles Durning as John Bartlett
- John Savage as Web Saunders
- Angelica Torn as Melissa Busteed
- Christy Scott Cashman as Elizabeth Preston
- Jason Alan Smith as Ralph Hazeltine
- Julie Harris as Melodeon player
- Roger Dillingham Jr. as Townsmen
- Lila Dupree as Pasha Norris
- Jonathan Edwards as Reverend Perly
- Donald Foley as Bluey Batchelder
- Peter Jordan as Ezekial
- Lauri Kriva as Townsperson
- Stephen Russell as Luther Norris
- Mike Williams as Captain Clapp

== Production ==
The film, adapted and directed by Daniel Adams, stars David Carradine, Rip Torn, Bruce Dern, Mariel Hemingway, Angelica Torn, Christy Scott Cashman, Charles Durning, Julie Harris (without dialog, as a melodeon player in one scene), Stephen Russell, and singer-songwriter Jonathan Edwards, who also scored the film.

Two of Norman Mailer's sons are attached to the film: Michael Mailer is one of the producers, and his younger brother Stephen Mailer plays one of two local ne'er-do-wells, along with actor Donald Foley.

The original cast was to have included Martin Landau, Burt Reynolds, Dennis Hopper, Anne Archer, and Peter Boyle, according to Adams.

According to the Boston Herald, filming was done on location in Osterville, Massachusetts in March 2007. Other locations included West Barnstable, Chatham, Provincetown, Yarmouthport, Orleans, and Hyannis, Massachusetts.

The production designer was David Allen, the costumer Deborah Newhall, and the casting director Carolyn Pickman.
