= An L.A. Minute =

- Film poster
- Directed by: Daniel Adams
- Written by: Daniel Adams; Larry Sloman
- Produced by: Michael Flanders
- Starring: Gabriel Byrne; Kiersey Clemons
- Cinematography: Denise Brassard
- Edited by: Joe D'Augustine
- Release date: August 24, 2018
- Country: United States
- Language: English

An L.A. Minute is a 2018 American comedy film directed by Daniel Adams, from a screenplay by Adams and Larry Sloman. It stars Gabriel Byrne, Kiersey Clemons, Bob Balaban, Ned Bellamy and others. It is Adams' first film after being released from prison where he spent 21 months for tax fraud related to his previous two films. The film was released in August 2018 only in three theaters. In December 2019, Adams was convicted of defrauding investors in connection to this film.
