= Beast of Burden (film) =

2018 film by Jesper Ganslandt

- Theatrical release poster
- Directed by: Jesper Ganslandt
- Screenplay by: Adam Hoelzel
- Produced by: Paul Schiff; Mary Alde; Michael Diamond; Jake Shapiro; Dan Reardon
- Starring: Daniel Radcliffe; Grace Gummer; Robert Wisdom; Pablo Schreiber
- Cinematography: Michael Barrett
- Edited by: Sherwood Jones
- Music by: Tim Jones
- Production companies: Paul Schiff Productions; Alde Entertainment; WYSJ Media; MGMT Entertainment Productions; Coastal Film Studios; Aperature Media Partners; Peak Distribution Partners
- Distributed by: Momentum Pictures
- Release date: February 23, 2018
- Running time: 90 minutes
- Country: United States
- Language: English
- Box office: $52,976

Beast of Burden is a 2018 American crime action film directed by Jesper Ganslandt and written by Adam Hoelzel. It stars Daniel Radcliffe, Grace Gummer, Robert Wisdom, and Pablo Schreiber, and follows an ex-Air Force pilot who must deliver cocaine across the Mexico–United States border for his final run as a drug smuggler.

The film was simultaneously released in limited theaters and on VOD in the United States on February 23, 2018, by Momentum Pictures.

== Plot ==
Sean Haggerty is a pilot who transports cocaine across the United States border. Over the course of his final day on the job, he must successfully navigate both the Drug Enforcement Administration and the Cartel, while simultaneously salvaging his fraught marriage.

== Cast ==
- Daniel Radcliffe as Sean
- Grace Gummer as Jen
- Pablo Schreiber as Bloom
- Robert Wisdom as Mallory
- David Joseph Martinez as Octavio Hernandez
- Renée Willett as Megan
- Mark Smith as Federale

== Production ==
The film had a limited theatrical release on February 23, 2018.

== Reception ==
On review aggregator Rotten Tomatoes, the film has an approval rating of 25% based on eight reviews and an average rating of 3.9/10.
