= Garden of Eden (1954 film) =

1954 film by Max Nosseck

- Directed by: Max Nosseck
- Written by: Max Nosseck; Nat Tanchuck
- Produced by: Walter Bibo; Norval E. Packwood
- Starring: Mickey Knox; Jamie O'Hara; Karen Sue Trent
- Cinematography: Boris Kaufman; Jorge Stahl Jr.
- Edited by: Paul Falkenberg
- Music by: Robert McBride
- Color process: Eastmancolor
- Production company: Excelsior Pictures Corp.
- Release date: September 1, 1954 (Los Angeles)
- Running time: 70 minutes
- Country: United States
- Language: English

Garden of Eden

Garden of Eden is a 1954 nudist film directed by Max Nosseck. It was co-produced by Walter Bibo and Norval E. Packwood. Outdoor scenes were filmed at Lake Como Family Nudist Resort in Lutz, Florida. Karen Sue Trent, about age seven (appearing as Joan in this film), went on to guest star as "Penny Woods" in 14 episodes of Leave It to Beaver four years later.

== Plot ==
In a flashback, businessman Jay Randolph Lattimore is confronted by Susan, the widow of Lattimore's son Tom, with the news that she and her six-year-old daughter Joan will no longer be dependent upon him and are leaving his house to move to Miami, where Susan believes she can resume her modeling career. Although Lattimore states he will not allow Susan to leave with his granddaughter, he later observes them as they say goodbye to the housekeeper and drive away.

Early in the morning, on the outskirts of Tampa, Susan is confused by a detour in the highway, and the car breaks down in a remote area. Another driver, Johnny Patterson, stops and attempts to fix the car. When he realizes a mechanic is required, he invites Susan and Joan to rest at the nearby Garden of Eden resort until a garage opens. After making them comfortable in a cabin at the "members only" resort, Johnny leaves to get the car fixed. He fails to advise Susan and Joan that the Garden of Eden is a nudist colony.

Meanwhile, the abandoned car has been found by a Highway Patrol unit and Lattimore is contacted. After a short nap, Susan awakens, looks out the cabin window and is surprised to see Joan and other children playing in the nude. Several naked adults also pass by. When Johnny returns to explain that he is arranging to have her car repaired, Susan tells him that she thinks that the children are delightfully natural naked, but is not convinced about the adults.

Lattimore, meanwhile, receives a phone call from the police advising him that Susan and Joan are safe at the Garden of Eden, which he assumes is a motel. After Johnny discovers that the car repair will take several days, Susan, fully dressed, wanders outside to meet several of the nudists. She meets a theater director who expresses an interest in her acting ability. Later, Joan asks her mother if she feels funny being the only person with clothes on.

Susan is then invited by a shirtless male resident to take a ride around the camp's lake in his motorboat. Susan asks to be dropped off on the other side of the lake, where she lies down, falls asleep, and dreams of disrobing and swimming naked in the lake. When Susan awakens, Johnny is there with an update on the car. Susan tells him that that evening the director has asked them to perform a scene together from Shakespeare's Romeo and Juliet.

Later, during the performance for the clothed theater group, Lattimore arrives at the camp's entrance demanding to take Joan home with him. However, some members persuade him that he is tired and angry and should rest overnight. Before going to sleep, Lattimore visits Joan, who tells him that she is happy there and wonders why he is so grouchy and makes her mother cry. Early the next morning, unaware that he is in a nudist camp, Lattimore leaves his cabin for a stroll and meets the theater director, whom he recognizes as a famous Shakespearean actor. He is stunned when the man goes swimming naked.

After observing more nudists, Lattimore phones his lawyer demanding that he take action, but the lawyer refuses as he, too, is a nudist. Later, Lattimore meets Johnny and apologizes for his conduct the night before. After wandering around the camp and observing how relaxed everyone is, Lattimore becomes enthused about nudism and decides to become a member of the resort. As Susan is putting Joan to bed, Lattimore comes to apologize to her for his years of hateful behavior. When Johnny shows up to take Susan to dinner, he announces that the babysitter cannot come, but that he has arranged for Lattimore to do the job. Johnny and Susan leave as Lattimore begins to tell his granddaughter a bedtime story.

Back in the present, Lattimore finishes explaining his recent personality change. He plans to donate a gymnasium to the Garden of Eden. In the interim, Susan and Johnny have married and are rehearsing a play. All then head for the camp, where they go swimming naked together.

== Cast ==
- Mickey Knox as Johnny Patterson
- Jamie O'Hara as Susan Latimore
- Karen Sue Trent as Joan Latimore
- R. G. Armstrong as J. Randolph Latimore
- Jane Rose as Latimore's Housekeeper
- Paula Morris
- Stephen Gray
- Arch Johnson
- Norval E. Packwood
- Jane Starling
- John Royal

== Court case ==
In the late 1950s Garden of Eden was the subject of a court case, Excelsior Pictures v. New York Board of Regents. The New York State Court of Appeals ruled that onscreen nudity was not obscene, and this ruling opened the door to more open depictions of nudity in american film.
