= Beyond the Law (1968 American film) =

- Directed by: Norman Mailer
- Written by: Norman Mailer
- Produced by: Buzz Farbar; Norman Mailer
- Starring: Norman Mailer; Rip Torn; Mickey Knox; George Plimpton; Lee Roscoe; Beverly Bentley; Marsha Mason
- Cinematography: D.A. Pennebaker; Nicholas T. Proferes; Jan Welt
- Edited by: Lana Jokel; Norman Mailer; Jan Welt
- Music by: Frank Conroy
- Distributed by: Grove Press; Supreme Mix Inc.
- Release date: April 2, 1968
- Running time: 110 minutes
- Country: United States
- Language: English

Beyond the Law is a 1968 independent film written by and starring Norman Mailer. Critic Bryo succinctly summarizes the plot: "Film shows a night at a Manhattan police station and then details how three of the detectives spend the remaining evening hours following completion of their shifts". The movie features early performances by future stars, Marsha Mason, Rip Torn and author George Plimpton. Norman Mailer also appears as a detective.

== Plot ==
The film begins with two detectives, Rocco and Mickey, meeting two young women, Judy Grundy and Marcia Stillwell at a restaurant for a date. The detectives begin to tell Judy and Marcia about their work.

They begin by describing a police lineup, and the scene cuts to the police station where several officers are shown generally mistreating their suspects. Through the lineup, the audience meets several of the suspects. The suspects are two Hispanic men named Mario Rodriguez and José Dulce, respectively, a black man in vertical stripes, Jack Scott, an unnamed man, and a kid. The next suspect is a man shown only briefly who claims to have killed his wife. He's followed by another black man named John Francis. After the lineup, the police question each suspect individually, ignoring requests to see one's lawyer and threatening most suspects. They go as far as to lay their hands many of the men being questioned.

Rocco and Mickey are shown again briefly with the women in the restaurant before we see them questioning three members of a sexual whipping party. Lieutenant Francis X. Pope is questioning one of the three, a young woman who flirts with him. Lt. Pope then questions the man who claims to have killed his wife. Afterward, Lt. Pope questions two Irish gang members who prompt him to talk about the "criminality" of mixing God and assholes.

Soon after, the Mayor of New York City comes to examine the police precinct. His inspection upsets Pope, especially when the mayor questions a few suspects who claim to have been mistreated. Lt. Pope lies and charms his way through the Mayor's questions, and the Mayor is called away on other business before he can chastise the precinct in any considerable way. Once the inspection is over, the Lieutenant and detectives leave the building to enjoy their evenings.

Lt. Pope's wife Mary tells him that she's cheated on him with a man named "Rocky", prompting Lt. Pope to invite the "whipping party" suspect out to where Rocco and Mickey are meeting with their dates. The appearance of Lt. Pope as drunk and with a sexual criminal upsets the detectives and their dates who all leave eventually at Pope's request. Pope then spends his evening drunkenly flirting with his suspect before Mary comes and tells the woman to leave. The film ends with Lt. Pope reconciling with Mary and reflecting upon the night with his two detectives, Rocco and Mickey.

== Production ==
Coproduced with Buzz Farbar and financed entirely by Norman Mailer, Beyond the Law was shot over four nights with three film crews and sound professionals. While Mailer is credited as writer and director, the film had next-to-no script and the actors were given little direction other than to "wing it" in-character and explore some ideas that echo his literary concerns, like the psychopathic hipster, the home-grown totalitarian, complex give-and-take of lovers, and the existential relationship between the cop and the criminal.

In Peter Manso's biography of Mailer, actor Tom Quinn recounts meeting Mailer and other Irish actors at Pier 52 one night for a late dinner. Mailer states, "We're making a movie tonight. It's called Beyond the Law, and you're the cops. So eat and drink all you want 'cause that's all you're gettin' paid." Mailer instructed the group that they pair off to talk about how they would approach their roles; Quinn continues: "So I got together with [Joe] Shaw. I'm a moralistic cop and he's a rape suspect, black and mean and evil. I addressed the lineup, making this little speech: 'You gotta go in there, do this, and think about what you've done!' . . . The whole night was weird". D.A. Pennebaker adds "There were too many people in it, too many things happening, with everybody doing their little Christmas gig, and Norman lost control. It was funny, though".

== Release ==
Beyond the Law premiered at the University of Notre Dame on April 2, 1968, to a crowd of 3,500. Mailer states that to meet this premiere, the final edits were rushed and that "we could have a film which was ready either artistically, or technologically, but could not have a picture which was ready both ways". They opted for "a film which was artistically as good as we could make it" but technically lacking. In September, the film was shown at the New York Film Festival, then opened October 23 at the Art Theater.

== Blue version ==
Beyond the Law—Blue extends the public release by following the extramarital activities of Mailer's character Lieutenant Francis Xavier Pope that lead, explains Michael Chaiken in his foreword to The Cinema of Norman Mailer, into sadism and murder. This X-rated version had a limited circulation with New Line, and follows Pope as he takes Lee Ray Rogers (Lee Roscoe), a prostitute and dominatrix, back to her apartment where she lights candles and invokes the Powers of Darkness — her character seeming more sinister than earlier in the film. They smoke pot and have sex before Xavier murders her. Justin Bozung explains that Mailer took the film out of circulation because he was displeased with his appearance and, perhaps, he was guilty about his exploitation of Roscoe. The only known copy of the blue version is housed at the Harvard Film Archive in Boston.

== Reception ==
While not a commercial success – Mailer lost eighty thousand dollars on the film – Beyond the Law was generally well received. Vincent Canby, reviewer for The New York Times writes that Beyond the Law "is so good and tough and entertaining so much of the time that you simply have to forgive those moments when the actors suddenly smirk self-consciously . . . and when it becomes unintelligible, as old Word Head himself does occasionally". Writing for Variety, reviewer Byro states the film is "one of the most realistic and frightening studies of the policeman and his world which has ever been made"; that the "verisimilitude of dialog, acting and behavior is astonishing". Of Mailer's performance, he says: "Mailer . . . provides a complex portrait of a man which has all the depth and complexity of a character in one of the author's novels". Bill Siska, writing for The Observer notes: "The use of 'cinéma vérité' gives to the events a spontaneity and a credibility they would otherwise lack . . . [but] Mailer's film is less cinema than it could be, than perhaps its maker would wish it to be." Richard Combs writes in the Monthly Film Bulletin: "But it is a measure of the flexibility and assurance with which Mailer handles the format generally that his insistent philosophical motifs jostle quite happily with more random, improvisational effects". The Los Angeles Times' Kevin Thomas sees Mailer's film as not really living up to the potential of "America's Number 1 writer": "As a kind of improvised put-on, Beyond the Law does have its moments of black irony and humor. Also, Mailer does get pretty good performances from his friends as well as himself. . . . [but] We never really get Beyond the Law".

== Analysis ==
Byro suggests the main theme of Beyond the Law: that there's little difference between a "successful gendarme and a successful criminal".

Comparing Beyond the Law to Wild 90, Maggie McKinley says that "it too is unscripted and, constructed as a series of interviews between cops and criminals during a night in a police station, also makes reference to the ideas of performance and being watched". McKinley also believes that in Beyond the Law, Mailer is "more restrained" than in Wild 90. She goes on to compare it to An American Dream and Tough Guys Don't Dance, saying that Mailer's belief that "the cop and the criminal [are] closely related" is "emphasize[d]" in all three works. McKinley states that Beyond the Law makes the audience "examin[e] the nature of guilt, innocence, and corruption". She continues: "In certain cases viewers are led to believe in the innocence of the accused, while in others we are asked to question it". Stylistically, McKinley notices that Mailer often zooms in on the actor's faces in order to let the audience have "gleamed some insight into each of these characters" while quickly switching between characters and narratives.
