= A Fool and His Money (1989 film) =

- Directed by: Daniel Adams
- Written by: Michael Mailer; Daniel Adams
- Produced by: Michael Mailer
- Starring: Jonathan Penner; Sandra Bullock; George Plimpton; Gerald Orange
- Production companies: Vidmark/Trimark Pictures; Lionsgate
- Release date: September 24, 1989
- Running time: 81 minutes
- Country: United States
- Language: English

A Fool and His Money (originally titled, Religion, Inc.) is a 1989 American comedy film directed by Daniel Adams and written by Michael Mailer and Adams. The film stars Jonathan Penner, George Plimpton, Wendy Adams, Gerald Orange, Chuck Pfiefer and Sandra Bullock in her first leading role. The movie was released on September 24, 1989.

== Plot ==
While watching TV, Morris Codman, a New York ex-adman, receives a message from God and is inspired to form a new religion called "The Preferent Church". Codman hires Ian Clarity, a janitor, to be in charge of his new religion, which is founded on a philosophy of selfishness and greed. The new religion is a success, and Codman and Clarity get rich. Later, in a predictable epiphany, and with the help of his skeptical girlfriend Debbie, he discovers the beauty of altruism, realizing that bilking people out of their money isn't worth the loss of his morals and his love.

== Cast ==
- Jonathan Penner as Morris Codman
- Gerald Orange as Dr. Ian Clarity, Ph.D.
- Sandra Bullock as Debbie Cosgrove
- George Plimpton as God
- Wendy Adams as Peggy
- Chuck Pfiefer as Brendan Collins

== Reception and reviews ==
TV Guide was critical of the film when it was released on video stating, "Bullock has only a small role in this clunker, and she's fine...but the production is too shabby-looking to approach the level of satire. Even as straightforward whimsy it fails. As if the Fool And His Money experience wasn't made unpleasant enough by the charisma-free team of Penner and Orange, sound quality is harsh and tinny, and the music is lousy. "Preferent" is spelled four different ways in the film, if that's indication of anything".

On the online publishing platform Medium, Brian Rowe calls the film a "lackluster comedy" and said..."unfortunately she [Bullock] has little to do in this movie. She shows up in a random scene every twenty minutes or so, usually upset with her boyfriend’s get-rich-quick scheme. Her only notable scene comes toward the end, when she counsels an African-American man, impressing him with her striking gray business suit".

Sandra Bullock

The film is notable for featuring a young Sandra Bullock several years before she became a well-known star. Later video and DVD releases of the film would feature Bullock prominently on the cover to maximize on her celebrity status.
