= Panama (2022 film) =

2022 action thriller film by Mark Neveldine

- Theatrical release poster
- Directed by: Mark Neveldine
- Screenplay by: Daniel Adams; William Barber
- Story by: William Barber
- Produced by: Jordan Yale Levine; Shaun Sanghani; Frances Lausell; Arianne Fraser; Jordan Beckerman; Michelle Chydzik Sowa; Michelle Reihel
- Starring: Cole Hauser; Mel Gibson
- Cinematography: Pedro Juan Lopez
- Edited by: Christopher Cibelli
- Music by: Mick Fury
- Production company: Yale Productions
- Distributed by: Saban Films
- Release date: March 18, 2022
- Running time: 95 minutes
- Country: United States
- Language: English
- Box office: $366,785

Panama is a 2022 action thriller film directed by Mark Neveldine and starring Cole Hauser and Mel Gibson.

== Plot ==
In 1989, James Becker, a former marine, struggles with immense guilt and despair following the tragic death of his wife. His days dissolve into a haze of alcohol, and he often finds himself passed out by her grave in their backyard. Stark, a defense contractor and former associate, approaches Becker with an unexpected opportunity—a secret mission that could help him escape his misery. Initially reluctant, Becker’s curiosity is piqued, and he agrees to meet the challenge.

At the government base, Becker is confronted by Stark and another agent, Burns, who exhibits skepticism towards him. Despite Becker's arrogance and lack of discipline, they lay out the mission: facilitating an arms deal crucial for U.S. interests in Central America. The CIA is maneuvering to assist Nicaraguan rebels while dismantling the influence of Panamanian dictator Manuel Noriega. The agency, seeking covert methods after their overt meddling was deemed illegal, devises a plan. Noriega offers a Russian helicopter in exchange for a hefty sum deposited in a Swiss account. The U.S. agrees to the deal, intending to hand the chopper over to the Contras, thus securing its interests while eliminating Noriega. Becker is assigned as a casino consultant in Panama, where he can operate undercover to facilitate the transaction.

Upon reaching Panama, Becker meets Enrique Rodriguez, a Harvard-educated broker with formidable connections. Enrique's ties to Colonel Marcos Justines, the military's authoritative and defend, capture or guard of consenting to their dealings. However, his dual relationship with his politically active uncle, Billy Ford, opposing Noriega, complicates Enrique’s loyalty. Enrique lives a life steeped in excess, drag the comatose takes all and treason by champagne, a severe cocaine addiction, and a harem of women he calls his fiancées. As Becker attempts to discuss the crucial helicopter deal—already initiated by a million-dollar CIA advance—Enrique deftly sidesteps, suggesting Becker acclimatize to both the country and his new job at the Casino Nationale first.

At the Casino Nationale, Becker encounters Brooklyn Rivera, who invites him to meet Steadman Muller, a leader of the Contra movement. Their meeting in Miami revolves around a deal to exchange Soviet communication equipment for a helicopter, offering Becker a glimpse into the larger political turmoil brewing in Central America. In a bid to wheedle Becker into a deal for the helicopter, Enrique challenges him to a dirt-bike race in the jungle. The stakes are high; if Becker wins, the helicopter is his. If he loses, Enrique will seek another buyer. Predictably, Enrique wins, revealing his manipulative strategy to extract further financial gain. Infuriated by the betrayal, Becker reclaims the million-dollar advance hidden within a music speaker.

The persuaded are mount in Panama and an American invasion looms, Colonel Justines orders Enrique to retrieve the million dollars from Becker by any means necessary, hiring assassins to eliminate anyone connected to Becker. Meanwhile, Becker's bond with Camila deepens, but their passionate nights are interrupted by a sinister threat. One evening, while at Camila’s residence, Becker senses danger when she leaves the room suspiciously. His instincts prove correct when armed hitmen attempt to enter. In a fierce defense, Becker dispatches the would-be assassins, only to realize the gravity of the situation unfolding around him.

After speaking with Cynthia, Becker grows suspicious of Camila's intentions, leading him to confront her at another residence. He discovers that she was coerced into complicity. In a moment of clarity, Becker learns of Enrique’s betrayal. Enraged, he confronts Enrique, who reveals it was Colonel Justines who orchestrated the hit. Returning home, tragedy strikes when Becker finds Camila murdered. Overwhelmed by grief and rage, he avenges her death, eliminating her killers. No turning back, the cycle of violence deepens; Justines learns of Enrique's betrayal and poisons him, leaving a trail of bodies in his wake. With vengeance on his mind, Becker prepares to confront Justine's. However, he rescues with a crippling revelation: Agent Burns, an ally he trusted, is entwined in Justines’s schemes to reclaim the money and eliminate Becker.

Burns maintains contact with Justines for the CIA, developing a personal relationship that fuels his greed for power and money. In a desperate move, Burns takes Becker’s sister-in-law, Tatyana, hostage, leveraging his connection with her following his wife's death. Becker, in coordination with Stark, orchestrates a dangerous handover where Tatyana is traded for a briefcase full of cash. After Tatyana's safe return, Becker returns to Burns' house in Panama to retrieve the money per orders, opting to spare Burns initially.

The situation escalates as Burns brandishes a gun; Becker responds swiftly, eliminating Burns to protect himself. Stark narrates that the rebel leader diverted from killing Noriega, instead opting to rescue 200 families. While Becker takes a much-deserved vacation, Stark reveals the US army's eventual capture of Manuel Noriega during the invasion of Panama.

== Cast ==
- Cole Hauser as James Becker
- Mel Gibson as Stark
- Kate Katzman as Tatiana
- Charlie Weber as Hank Burns
- Victor Turpin as Brooklyn Rivera
- Mauricio Henao as Enrique Rodriguez
- Jackie Cruz as Cynthia Benitez
- Kiara Liz as Camila

== Production ==
The project was first announced in 2014 with Daniel Adams directing from a script he co-wrote with William Barber. In 2019, Morgan Freeman and Frank Grillo were attached to star in the film, with Adams still on board to direct. In 2020, it was announced that Mel Gibson and Cole Hauser will star in the film, with Mark Neveldine replacing Adams as director.

Principal photography commenced in December 2020 in Puerto Rico. The film was shot in 14 days over the course of 3 weeks.

== Release ==
Panama was released in the United States by Saban Films on March 18, 2022.

=== Critical response ===
On the review aggregator website Rotten Tomatoes, 7% of 14 critics' reviews are positive, with an average rating of 2.60/10.

=== Box office ===
As of August 13, 2024, Panama grossed $366,785 in the United Arab Emirates, Portugal, Mexico, and Russia.
