= Malachi Throne =

American actor (1928–2013)

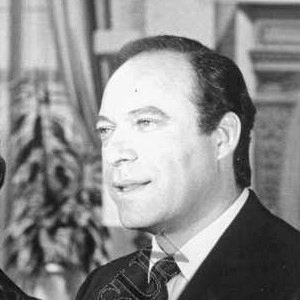
- Throne in It Takes a Thief (1968)
- Born: December 1, 1928; New York City, U.S.
- Died: March 13, 2013 (aged 84); Brentwood, California, U.S.
- Occupation: Actor
- Years active: 1939–2013
- Spouses: Judith Merians (m. 1965; div. 1992) Marjorie Bernstein Throne (m. 1992)
- Children: 2

Malachi Throne (December 1, 1928 – March 13, 2013) was an American actor known for his role as Noah Bain in It Takes a Thief. He also had guest-starring roles on multiple television series, including Star Trek and Batman, and appeared in films and theater.

== Early life ==
Throne was born in New York City to Austro-Hungarian and Russian Jewish parents, Samuel and Rebecca Throne, who emigrated to America before World War II. He was raised in The Bronx, and first appeared on stage at the age of ten in 1939 in the New York Parks Department production of Tom Sawyer as Huckleberry Finn.

He attended Brooklyn College, and he served in the U.S. Army during the Korean War.

== Television career ==
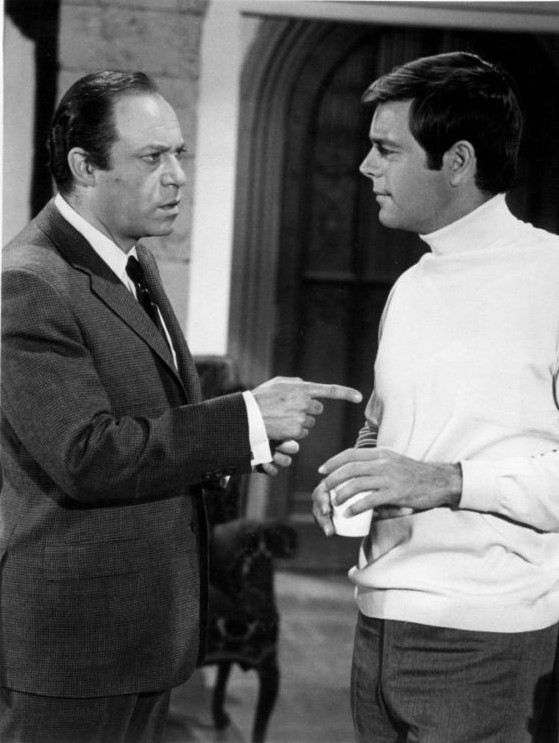
Malachi Throne with Robert Wagner in It Takes a Thief, 1968.

Throne was a guest star on many television series of the 1960s and 1970s, including Mr. Novak (four episodes), The Defenders, Naked City, The Wild Wild West, Ben Casey, The Untouchables, GE True, Combat!, The Fugitive, Laredo (1966 as Finnegan in the episode "Finnegan"), The Man from U.N.C.L.E. ("The Four-Steps Affair" from 1965), Mannix (as Inspector Frank Kyler in the 1967 episode, "Run Sheep Run"), The High Chaparral, Hogan's Heroes, Babylon 5 ( "The Coming of Shadows" ) and Lost in Space. He also played the character Sandifer in the 1964 Perry Mason episode "The Case of the Simple Simon".

He co-starred with Robert Wagner in the TV series It Takes a Thief. Throne was a favorite actor of TV producer Irwin Allen; he appeared in numerous roles in Allen's series Voyage to the Bottom of the Sea, The Time Tunnel, Land of the Giants, and Lost in Space, often as several different characters in the same series. Throne played in two episodes of Mission: Impossible during seasons one and four as two different characters. Earlier in The Outer Limits TV series ("Cold Hands, Warm Heart", 1964) he appeared with William Shatner.

=== Roles in Star Trek ===
Throne provided the voice of the Keeper in Star Trek's first pilot episode "The Cage" (1964). Not broadcast in its original form for many years, most of the episode was included within the two-part "The Menagerie" (1966). As Throne was cast in another role in "The Menagerie", Commodore José I. Méndez, the Keeper's voice was electronically altered in pitch.

On Star Trek: The Next Generation, Throne played Pardek, a Romulan senator, in the two-part episode "Unification". In 2004, he appeared in the second episode of the New Voyages, titled "In Harm's Way".

=== Batman ===
Throne played the villain False-Face in the ABC series Batman. The character, who used a variety of disguises, wore a semitransparent mask when not in the middle of his crimes. The mask rendered Throne's face unrecognizable on screen. Playing off this effect, but against Throne's wishes, the show's producers wrote the onscreen credit as "? as False Face", leaving Throne uncredited. But at the end credits of "Holy Rat Race", Throne's full name was credited. Later, he appeared in animation as the voices of the Judge on The New Batman Adventures (1998) and Fingers in Batman Beyond (2000).

== Film appearances ==
His film career was not as prolific as his television work, though he did have roles in films such as The Young Lovers (1964), Beau Geste (1966), Code Name: Heraclitus (1967), Assault on the Wayne (1971), The Greatest (1977), Stunts (1977) and Primary Motive (1992). He also had a small role in the 2002 film Catch Me if You Can.

== Theater career ==
Throne lived in Southern California, and he did much local theater work there. He was a member of the Theater West company in Hollywood. He also won critical acclaim for several performances with the Fountain Theatre in Los Angeles. Much earlier in his career, he had appeared briefly on Broadway (as Mal Thorne) in Reginald Lawrence's Legend of Lizzie and other plays.

== Advertising ==
Throne was a national television spokesman for Ziebart in several advertising campaigns throughout the 1970s. He also narrated the 1976 trailer for the film Star Wars (1977).

== Personal life and death ==
Throne was married to Judith Merians from 1965 to 1992, and Marjorie Bernstein from 1992 until his death. He and Merians have two children: Zachary Throne (born 1967) and Josh Throne (born 1969).

Throne died of lung cancer at his home in Brentwood, California on March 13, 2013, at the age of 84.

== Filmography ==
=== Film ===
Year	Title	Role	Notes
1964	The Young Lovers	Prof. Schwartz	
1966	Beau Geste	Kerjacki	
1967	Code Name: Heraclitus	Hoffman	
1972	Six Hundred and Sixty-Six	The Man (voice)	
1973	Frasier, the Sensuous Lion	Bill Windsor	
1977	The Greatest	Payton Jory	
1977	Stunts	Earl O'Brien	
1987	Eat and Run	Opera Announcer	
1992	Primary Motive	Ken Blumenthal	
2002	Catch Me If You Can	Abe Penner	
2009	Green Lantern: First Flight	Ranakar (voice)	Direct-to-video

== Television ==
Year	Title	Role	Notes
1965–1966	Star Trek: The Original Series	The Keeper (voice) and Commodore Jose I. Mendez	2 episodes
1966	Lost in Space	The Thief	Episode: "The Thief from Outer Space"
1966	Batman	False-Face	2 episodes
1966	The Time Tunnel	Hara Singh	Episode: "Night of the Long Knives"
1967	The Time Tunnel	Niccolò Machiavelli	Episode: "The Death Merchant"
1967	Voyage to the Bottom of the Sea	Blackbeard	Episode: "The Return of Blackbeard"
1968–1969	It Takes a Thief	Noah Bain	Seasons 1 and 2 only.
1971	Assault on the Wayne	Dr. Dykers	Television film
1971	Hogan's Heroes	Major Pruhst	Episode: "Hogan's Double Life"
1973	Kojak	Solly DeChico	Episode: "Dead on His Feet"
1976	Ark II	War Lord Brack	
1978	What's Happening	Consul	Episode: "Diplomatic Immunity"
1991	Star Trek: The Next Generation	Pardek	Episode: "Unification"
1993	Animaniacs	God (voice)	2 episodes
1995	Babylon 5	Centauri Prime Minister	Episode: "The Coming of Shadows"
1998	The New Batman Adventures	Judge (voice)	Episode: "Judgement Day"
2000	Batman Beyond	Fingers (voice)	Episode: "Speak No Evil"
2002	The West Wing	Ben Yosef	Episode: "The Red Mass"
2006	Avatar: The Last Airbender	Mongke (voice)	2 episodes

== Discography ==
In 1980, Throne provided the voice-over narration for a vinyl record soundtrack version of the Star Wars sequel film, The Empire Strikes Back. In 1999, he provided the narration for rock band Powerman 5000’s album Tonight the Stars Revolt!.
