= Sasha Lazard =

American classical crossover singer

- Born: New York City, NY, USA
- Occupation: Singer
- Spouse: Michael Mailer (m. 2004; div. 2011)
- Children: 2
- Website: https://sashalazard.com/

Sasha Lazard is an American classical crossover singer. Born and raised in New York City, with time spent in Paris, she studied opera at Bennington College and the San Francisco Conservatory of Music. After completing her studies, Lazard performed electronic music at various nightclubs in New York, Los Angeles, and Ibiza.

Lazard released her debut album, The Myth of Red, on May 7, 2002, through Higher Octave Music. The album, which draws inspiration from the myth of Inanna's descent to the underworld, appeared on the Billboard charts in both the dance music and classical crossover categories. Its influences include Giuseppe Verdi's La Traviata, the works of Charles Pierre Baudelaire, and Antonio Cesti's Intorno all'idol mio.

The song "Angeli" by Sasha Lazard was featured in Victoria's Secret's Fall 2006 campaign. Additionally, it was included in the soundtrack of the film Modigliani, starring Andy García.

Lazard collaborated with soprano Shawna Stone and Grammy award-winning producer Peter Asher on Siren, which was released on March 6, 2007, on Manhattan Records/EMI.

In 2018, Lazard produced the soundtrack for the feature film Blind with Dave Eggar, Amy Lee, and Chuck Palmer.

== Personal life ==
In May 2004, she married film producer Michael Mailer. They share a son named Cyrus. The two divorced in 2011. She shares another son Lucien with Andrew Drexel Allen.

== Discography ==
=== Studio albums ===
- The Myth of Red (2002)
- Moonfall (2005)
- Siren (2007, with Shawna Stone)
- Lumiere (2014)

=== Soundtracks ===
Year	Film	Song(s)	Notes
1998	Dark Harbor	"Ava Maria"	Appeared as Funeral Singer
1999	Princess Mononoke	"Princess Mononoke Theme Song"	
1999	Holy Smoke!	"Ava Maria"	
2000	Cement	"Ava Maria", "O del mio dolce ardor"	
2000	Cowboys & Angels	"Angel Mella Brezza"	
2002	Queen of the Damned	"Temptation"	
2004	Modigliani	"Ode to Innocence"	
2006	Kettle of Fish	"Unexpected"	
2009	The Lodger	"Marigold", "Di Notte"	
2016	Blind	"Bird in a Cage", "Lumiere Remix", "The Sexiest Mistake"	Appeared as herself
