= Primary Motive =

1992 film by Daniel Adams

- Directed by: Daniel Adams
- Written by: Daniel Adams; William Snowden
- Produced by: Thomas Gruenberg
- Starring: Judd Nelson; Richard Jordan; Sally Kirkland; Justine Bateman; John Savage
- Cinematography: John Drake
- Edited by: Jacqueline Carmody
- Music by: John Cale
- Release date: 2 August 1992
- Running time: 91 minutes
- Country: United States
- Language: English

Primary Motive is a 1992 American political thriller film written and directed by Daniel Adams.

== Plot ==
Andrew Blumenthal (Judd Nelson), a rookie ambitious press secretary targets the crooked opponent of his Boston candidate.

== Cast ==
- Judd Nelson as Andrew Blumenthal
- Richard Jordan as Chris Poulas
- Sally Kirkland as Helen Poulas
- Justine Bateman as Darcy Link
- John Savage as Wallace Roberts
- Frank Converse as John Eastham
- Joe Grifasi as Paul Melton
- Larry "Ratso" Sloman as Charlie Phelps
- Malachi Throne as Ken Blumenthal
- John Bedford Lloyd as Pat O'Hara
- Daniel Adams as Fisherman
- Tatyana Yassukovich as Poulas' receptionist
- Maggie Wagner as Betty Sullivan
- Bill Siegel as Republican State chairman
- William Bulger as Self

== Reception ==
Variety said: "slipshod dialogue and the cursory look of its lighting, sound and staging reduce it to parody".
