= Donald Foley =

American actor (1963-2011)

- Born: Donald Charles Foley; 1963; Boston, Massachusetts
- Died: October 25, 2011 (aged 47–48)
- Occupation: actor
- Years active: 2003–2011

Donald Foley (1963 — 2011) was an American actor.

== Life and career ==
Shortly after the September 11 attacks, Foley made a decision. “It kind of woke me up a little bit,” he said. Life was too short and too uncertain to waste it doing something he didn’t really want to do, he said. A self-employed computer programmer, Foley was admittedly wasting hours and hours every day playing computer games.

After 9/11, he decided that what he really wanted to do was act – so he started acting. “I was feeling like life was not giving me what I needed,” he said. “I felt like something was missing, so I decided to make a change and try my hand at acting. I never looked back.”

Foley was from Boston and is best known for his role of Bluey Batchelder in the movie The Golden Boys.

== Partial filmography ==
Year	Title	Role	Notes
2007	Brotherhood	Joey Richards	Episode: "Dear Landlord 1:3–4"
2009	The Invention of Lying	The Yelling Man	Feature film
2009	The Golden Boys	Bluey Batchelder	Feature film
