= Wild 90 =

1968 film by Norman Mailer

- DVD cover
- Directed by: Norman Mailer
- Written by: Improvised by the cast
- Produced by: Norman Mailer
- Starring: Norman Mailer; Buzz Farbar; Mickey Knox
- Cinematography: D. A. Pennebaker
- Edited by: Norman Mailer; Jan Welt
- Music by: Charlie Brown
- Color process: Black and white
- Distributed by: Supreme Mix Inc.
- Release date: January 8, 1968 (US)
- Running time: 90 minutes
- Country: United States
- Language: English

Wild 90 is a 1968 experimental film directed and produced by American novelist Norman Mailer, who also plays the starring role. The film is a creative collaboration based on three friends, The Prince (Mailer), Buzz Cameo (Buzz Farbar) and Twenty Years (Mickey Knox), who are seen drinking, braying, and fighting in a run-down apartment in Lower Manhattan. Pretending to be gangsters, the trio plays with props such as pistols and machine guns. Mailer's first effort into filmmaking, the film was shot on a 16-millimeter camera and recorded on magnetic sound tape.

== Plot ==
A trio of Mafia gangsters, The Prince, Buzz Cameo and Twenty Years, are hiding in a warehouse. They have surrounded themselves with guns and liquor, and they kill time by joking and bickering with scatological language. But as their isolation from the world progresses, their drinking and arguing intensify. They are briefly visited by a man with a barking dog, the canine is silenced when The Prince outbarks him, and by two women named Margie and Lillian, one of whom gives The Prince a knife for committing suicide. The police arrive at the warehouse and the gangsters are taken away.

== Production ==
Wild 90 was Norman Mailer's first attempt by to create a motion picture. The concept for the film came when Mailer and several actors who were appearing in an Off-Broadway adaptation of his novel The Deer Park engaged in an acting game in which they pretended that they were gangsters. Buzz Farbar recounted the genesis of the film: "During the run of The Deer Park, Norman, Mickey, and I had been hanging out at the Charles IV restaurant on Thompson and Fourth Street, and that's where the idea for the film came from — Wild 90. We were all very funny, a lot funnier than in the movie. We'd start insulting each other, each of us coming back with more, and it was Norman who said we ought to film it, and I suggested Leacock and Pennebaker."

The title Wild 90 is a reference to an alleged Mafia slang term for finding oneself in deep trouble.

Mailer spent $1,500 of his own money to finance Wild 90. Documentary filmmaker D. A. Pennebaker served as cinematographer and shot the film in black-and-white 16mm. The production took place over four consecutive nights and the entire film was improvised by Mailer and his cast. The resulting dialogue was unusually heavy with profanities; Mailer later claimed that Wild 90 "has the most repetitive, pervasive obscenity of any film ever made."

Puerto Rican boxer José Torres appears as the man with the barking dog and Beverly Bentley (Mailer's wife) plays Margie, the woman with the knife. Mailer did not allow any retakes during the shoot.

Mailer wound up with 150 minutes of film, which was edited down to 90 minutes. Because of a technical glitch during production, roughly 25% of the film's soundtrack is muffled. Mailer refused to redub the problem patches on the soundtrack and later joked that the film "sounds like everybody is talking through a jockstrap."

== Release ==
Pennebaker tried to convince Mailer not to release Wild 90 theatrically because of the problematic nature of its soundtrack. Mailer disregarded the suggestion and went forward by distributing the film himself. He promoted the film extensively and wrote a self-congratulatory essay on the film that appeared in Esquire.

== Reception ==
Reviews for Wild 90 were overwhelmingly negative.

Renata Adler, writing in The New York Times, opined: "It relies also upon the indulgence of an audience that must be among the most fond, forgiving, ultimately patronizing and destructive of our time ... The battle against dead forms, useless conventions, and pointless inhibitions is over, or no longer interesting; the breakthroughs are now in terms of limit, live forms, tighter economies. The very urgency that Mailer has always tried to communicate makes it impossible to wade through so much rambling for a little art."

Robert Singer's review notes that the unscripted dialogue contributes to the realism of the film. Wild 90 is a not a typical gangster film but rather a playful reassertion of gangsterism. He reveals that despite production limitations, Wild 90 should be read alongside other 1960s underground films as part of the "independent production tradition of the experimental American cinema."

Robert Hatch, reviewing the film for The Nation, stated that the film was "rambling, repetitious...incoherent and inept." Stanley Kauffmann, writing in The New Republic, said that "I cannot say that Mailer was drunk the whole time he was on camera. I can only hope he was drunk."

Mailer responded to the negative reviews by including them in the original theatrical poster. Wild 90 was a commercial failure, but Mailer followed up the production with two additional improvised experimental films, Beyond the Law (1968) and Maidstone (1970).

== See also ==
- List of American films of 1968

== Bibliography ==
- Adler, Renata (January 8, 1968). "The Screen: Norman Mailer's Mailer: 'Wild 90,' Another Ad for Writer, Bows". The New York Times. Movie Review.
- Bozung, Justin (2017). "Visualizing Being and Nothingness: Mailer Meets Godot". The Cinema of Norman Mailer: Film is Like Death. New York: Bloomsbury Academic. pp. 51–64. ISBN 9781501325519.
- Dearborn, Mary V. (1999). Mailer: A Biography. Boston: Houghton Mifflin. ISBN 0395736552.
- Manso, Peter (1985). Mailer: His Life and Times. New York: Washington Square Press. ISBN 9781416562863. OCLC 209700769.
- McKinley, Maggie (2017). "Mailer Interrogates Machismo: Self-Reflexive Commentary in Wild 90 and Why Are We In Vietnam?". In Bozung, Justin (ed.). The Cinema of Norman Mailer: Film is Like Death. New York: Bloomsbury Academic. pp. 65–76. ISBN 9781501325519.
- Medved, Harry; Medved, Michael (1980). The Golden Turkey Awards. New York: Perigree Books. pp. 71, 72, 74. ISBN 0-399-50463-X.
- "Norman Mailer: 'Anyone Can Make a Feature Film'". Variety. December 27, 1967. pp. 5, 16.
