= Renée Willett =

American actress

- Born: New York City, New York, U.S.
- Education: University of Southern California (BA, MBA)
- Occupation: Actress

Renée Willett is an American actress, comedian, and producer known for The Comedian, Blind, and Sharknado 3: Oh Hell No!.

== Early life and education ==
Willett was born and raised in New York City and has two younger siblings. She attended IMG Academy, a tennis-focused boarding school. Willett graduated from the University of Southern California with a Bachelor of Arts degree in economics, Spanish, and theatre.

She later trained in performing arts at the William Esper Studio in New York and in Los Angeles with the Upright Citizens Brigade and the Groundlings. Willett later earned a Master of Business Administration from the USC Marshall School of Business.

== Career ==
Willett made her film debut in the third installment of the Sharknado series in 2015. She later appeared as Ashley in The Comedian. In 2016, Willett was cast in the indie film Blind. Renée later produced the film The Yellow Birds.

In 2018, Willett acted in the drama Beast of Burden, and acted and produced the film Run With The Hunted.

Willett has also performed stand-up comedy.

== Filmography ==
=== Film ===
Year	Title	Role	Notes
1998	Sins of Fate	Daughter	
2013	45 Days	Party Guest	
2016	Lazy Eye	Waitress	Associate producer
2016	Blind	Kelly	Co-producer
2016	The Comedian	Ashley	Associate producer
2017	The Yellow Birds	Claire	Associate producer
2018	Beast of Burden	Megan	
2018	Flight 666	Anna	
2018	The Odd Essay	Natalia	
2019	7 Days to Vegas	Kelly Boots	
2019	Run with the Hunted	Keryn	Executive producer
2021	Body Brokers	Penny	
2021	Die in a Gunfight	RNG Anchor	

=== Television ===
Year	Title	Role	Notes
2015	Sharknado 3: Oh Hell No!	Technician Hammer	Television film
2019	Strange Girl in a Strange Land	Barista	2 episodes
