= Getting In =

- VHS cover
- Directed by: Doug Liman
- Written by: P.J. Posen; Joel Posen; Jonathan Lewin
- Produced by: Victor Simpkins; Nelle Nugent; Adam Lindermann
- Starring: Stephen Mailer; Andrew McCarthy; Kristy Swanson
- Cinematography: David Claessen
- Edited by: Stephen Mirrione
- Music by: Alex Wurman
- Distributed by: Trimark Home Video
- Release date: December 7, 1994
- Running time: 94 minutes
- Country: United States
- Language: English

Getting In, also known as Student Body, is a 1994 American black comedy film directed by Doug Liman starring Andrew McCarthy, Stephen Mailer and Kristy Swanson. It was the feature film debut of Doug Liman. The film was released direct-to-video on December 7, 1994.

Despite its considerably famous cast, IndieWire has reported that information about the film is virtually impossible to track down.

== Plot ==
When Rupert Grimm learns that there are several students ahead of him in line to be admitted to the Johns Hopkins School of Medicine he devises a plan for them each to meet with a series of unfortunate '"accidents". Gabriel Higgs also is in need to get into the school, considering that every generation ahead of him has been a doctor. He attempts to bribe both Amanda Morel and Randall Burns, but they refuse to be bribed. Instead, both are arrogant and belittle Gabriel. If it wasn't for the hacking skills of his friend Ron, Gabriel wouldn't have made the list at all. Gabriel then attempts to think of away to bribe Kirby Watts, but he falls in love with her instead, though he is rebuffed there as well.

First, Randall meets a grisly end when he attempts to use a shower after getting chemicals on his clothing. Instead, the shower releases a different liquid that engulfs Randall in flames and he burns to death. Amanda meets her demise after eating a morel fungus to which she is allergic. Both Amanda and Randall have met demises similar to their surnames. By now, Gabriel has become the main suspect, though he manages to convince Kirby that he is not the killer. Soon, Rupert is able to lure Kirby into a situation that puts her life in danger. Rupert announces his grand scheme to murder everyone in front of him on the list and frame Gabriel. Gabriel is able to save the day and defeat Rupert and save Kirby. With both Randall and Amanda dead, Gabriel is able to continue his family’s legacy by marrying Kirby as she is accepted into the school, carry on his last name for the family. Gabriel becomes an ecology professor and Rupert's dead body is donated to Kirby’s class for science.

== Cast ==
- Stephen Mailer as Gabriel Higgs
- Andrew McCarthy as Rupert Grimm
- Kristy Swanson as Kirby Watts
- Calista Flockhart as Amanda Morel
- Matthew Perry as Randall Burns
- Dave Chappelle as Ron
- Christine Baranski as Mrs. Margaret 'Maggie' Higgs
- Len Cariou as Dr. Lionel Higgs / Dr. Ezekiel Higgs
- Joanne Pankow as Nurse
- Sean Bridgers as the Dumpster Hunter
- Christina Keefe as Rachel

== Reception ==
TV Guide wrote, "Despite some missteps--e.g., the childish cruelty of a scene involving rat mazes, the caricaturing of Gabriel's parents, a general failure to address the morality of Gabriel's scheme--Getting In consistently mines bitter laughter from a serious subject. A deft satire of the quest for the 'right' school, it's equally successful as comedy and as thriller. Indeed, this fiendishly amusing revenge lampoon stirs up fond memories of Theatre of Blood and The Abominable Dr. Phibes."
