= The Invention of Lying =

2009 film by Ricky Gervais

- American theatrical release poster
- Directed by: Ricky Gervais; Matthew Robinson
- Written by: Ricky Gervais; Matthew Robinson
- Produced by: Ricky Gervais; Dan Lin; Lynda Obst; Oly Obst
- Starring: Ricky Gervais; Jennifer Garner; Jonah Hill; Louis C.K.; Jeffrey Tambor; Fionnula Flanagan; Rob Lowe; Tina Fey
- Cinematography: Tim Suhrstedt
- Edited by: Chris Gill
- Music by: Tim Atack
- Production companies: Radar Pictures; Media Rights Capital; Lynda Obst Productions
- Distributed by: Warner Bros. Pictures (United States); Focus Features International (through Universal Pictures; international)
- Release dates: September 14, 2009 (TIFF); October 2, 2009 (United States and United Kingdom)
- Running time: 100 minutes
- Countries: United States; United Kingdom
- Language: English
- Budget: $18.5 million
- Box office: $32.7 million

The Invention of Lying is a 2009 romantic fantasy comedy film written and directed by comedian Ricky Gervais and writer Matthew Robinson in their directorial debuts. The film stars Gervais as the first human with the ability to lie in a world where people can only tell the truth. The cast also includes Jennifer Garner, Jonah Hill, Louis C.K., Jeffrey Tambor, Fionnula Flanagan, Rob Lowe, Philip Seymour Hoffman and Tina Fey.

The film premiered at the Toronto International Film Festival on September 14, 2009, and was released in the United States on October 2, 2009, by Warner Bros. Pictures and Focus Features. It received mixed reviews from critics and grossed $32.7 million against a $18.5 million budget.

== Plot ==
The film is set in an alternative reality in which lying does not exist and people are straightforward about what they think and feel.

Mark Bellison is a screenwriter in a film industry limited to historical readings because there is no fiction. One night he has a date with the beautiful and wealthy Anna McDoogles. She tells Mark she is not attracted to him, because of his looks and failing financial situation, but is going out with him as a favor to his best friend, Greg Kleinschmidt.

The next day, Mark is fired from his job because of the lack of interest in his films (which are set in the lackluster 1300s), and his landlord threatens to evict him for not paying his rent. Crestfallen, he goes to the bank to close his account. The teller informs him that the computers are down and asks him how much money he has in his account. Mark then has an epiphany that enables him to tell the world's first lie, which is that he has $800—the amount he owed his landlord—in his account. He then lies in a variety of other circumstances, initially for personal gain; he prevents a police officer from arresting Greg for drunk driving, convinces a woman to have casual sex with him to prevent the end of the world (but fakes a call from NASA confirming the world has been saved after deciding that this was exploitative), breaks the bank at a casino, and writes a screenplay about the world being invaded by aliens in the 14th century that ends with the claim that everyone's memories were erased. He becomes wealthy from the film's success. Mark soon realises that lying can also be used to help others, such as stopping his depressive neighbour Frank Fawcett from committing suicide. Soon after, Mark convinces Anna to go out with him again. She congratulates Mark for his financial success and admits that he would be a good husband and father, but she is still not attracted to him because his genetics and appearance are not likely to produce the kind of child she wants.

Mark then gets a call that his mother, Martha, has had a heart attack and rushes to the hospital. There, the doctor tells him that Martha is going to die. She is scared of death, believing that it will bring an eternity of nothingness. Mark, through tears, tells her that death instead brings a joyful afterlife and she dies happy. Mark soon receives worldwide attention as the news of his supposed information about death spreads. After encouragement from Anna, he tells the world, through ten main points, that he talks to a "Man In The Sky" who controls everything and promises great rewards in the good place after death, as long as you do no more than three "bad things".

Some time later, Anna and Mark are together in a park and Anna asks him, if they marry, if his now being rich and famous would make their children more physically attractive. Mark wants to lie, but does not because of his love for Anna, and says "No". Meanwhile, Mark's rival, Brad Kessler, pursues Anna romantically, motivated by his jealousy at Mark's success. Though Brad's selfish and cruel manner makes Anna uncomfortable, she continues dating him and they become engaged. Before the wedding, Greg appears and convinces Mark that he has not missed his chance with Anna. Mark reluctantly attends Anna and Brad's wedding, where he objects to the marriage. The officiant, however, informs him that only the Man in the Sky can stop the wedding. Brad and Anna both ask Mark to ask the Man in the Sky what Anna should do, but Mark refuses to say anything and leaves, wanting Anna to choose for herself. Anna walks out and Mark confesses his ability to lie. Anna asks why he did not lie to convince her to marry him; Mark states that it "wouldn't count". Anna confesses that she loves him.

Some time later, Anna and Mark are shown happily married with a son (and another child on the way), who appears by his actions to have inherited his father's ability to lie.

== Cast ==
- Ricky Gervais as Mark Bellison
- Jennifer Garner as Anna McDoogles
- Jonah Hill as Frank Fawcett
- Louis C.K. as Greg Kleinschmidt
- Jeffrey Tambor as Anthony James
- Fionnula Flanagan as Martha Bellison
- Rob Lowe as Brad Kessler
- Tina Fey as Shelley Bailey
- Christopher Guest as Nathan Goldfrappe
- Roz Ryan as Nurse Barbara
- Jimmi Simpson as Bob Scott
- Shaun Williamson as Richard Bellison
- Bobby Moynihan as Bellison's Assistant
- Dreama Walker as Receptionist
- Ashlie Atkinson as Bank Teller
- Donald Foley as Yelling Man
- Martin Starr as Waiter
- Ruben Santiago-Hudson as Landlord
- John Hodgman as Wedding Overseer
- Nate Corddry as News Reporter
- Stephanie March as Blonde Woman on the Street
- Matthew Robinson as Person #4
- Jason Bateman as Doctor (cameo)
- Stephen Merchant as Man at the Door (cameo)
- Philip Seymour Hoffman as Jim The Bartender (cameo)
- Edward Norton as Traffic Cop Hendrick (cameo)
- Karl Pilkington as Cave Man (cameo)
- Eric André as Mansion Man (cameo)
- Donna Sorbello as Anna's mother

== Production ==
=== Development ===
Matthew Robinson's script which was titled This Side of the Truth at the time, was included in 2007 official Black List of the “most liked” un-produced scripts in Hollywood. Robinson and producer Lynda Obst sent Ricky Gervais the script out of the blue in the hopes that it would spark his interest. Gervais loved it and eventually flew Robinson to London to retool the script and make the movie. Robinson's original idea for a feature film grew from a skit he wrote about two people on a date who do not have the ability to lie. He later expanded on the idea for more skits with the same premise and then adapted them into a full film script.

Media Rights Capital and Radar Pictures financed the film. However, 1821 Pictures sued Radar Pictures for breach of contract over failure to pay a $450,000 production fee. Shooting took place primarily in Lowell, Massachusetts; location shoots also took place in Quincy, Andover, North Andover, Sudbury, Tewksbury, Boston, Massachusetts, and Haverhill, Massachusetts. Principal photography was completed in June 2008. During production the film was originally titled This Side of the Truth, same as the script.

=== Soundtrack ===
The soundtrack includes Elvis Costello's otherwise-unreleased rendition of the Cat Stevens song "Sitting".

Songs also include: Eddie and the Hot Rods' "Do Anything You Wanna Do", Donovan's "Catch the Wind", Supertramp's "Give a Little Bit", and Electric Light Orchestra's "Mr. Blue Sky".

== Release ==
Warner Bros. Pictures owns the rights for the film's North American distribution, while Universal Pictures owns the rights to release the film outside of North America. The film was released in North America and the United Kingdom on October 2, 2009. Its world premiere occurred two weeks earlier at the Toronto International Film Festival on September 14, 2009.

The DVD and Blu-ray were released on January 19, 2010. Gervais briefly promoted the DVD during his hosting duty at the 67th Golden Globe Awards in a joking manner, referring to its modest box office results.

== Reception ==
=== Critical reception ===
Review aggregator Rotten Tomatoes reports that 56% of 188 critics have given the film a positive review, with an average rating of 5.9/10. The site's consensus says, "It doesn't quite follow through on its promise, and relies too heavily on shopworn romantic comedy tropes, but The Invention of Lying is uncommonly sly and funny." On Metacritic, which assigns a weighted average rating out of 100 to reviews from film critics, the film has a rating score of 58 based on 31 reviews, suggesting "mixed or average reviews".

Roger Ebert of the Chicago Sun-Times awarded the film three and a half stars out of four saying "in its amiable, quiet, PG-13 way, [it] is a remarkably radical comedy". Xan Brooks of The Guardian was also favourable, giving the film four out of five stars, although he was critical of some aspects: "It is slick and it is funny. But it is also too obviously schematic, while that romantic subplot can feel awfully synthetic at times." Manohla Dargis of The New York Times called it a "mostly funny if melancholic defense of deceit" that "looks so shoddy that you yearn for the camerawork, lighting and polish of his shows, like the original The Office, because, really, these days TV rarely looks this bad." In some scenes, Dargis says "lying becomes a means to transcendence, an escape from the quotidian, from our oppressive literal-mindedness, from our brute selves. For the most part, though, Mr. Gervais prefers to shock us with our own brutality...[with] unvarnished truths [that] begin to feel heavy, cruel."

=== Box office ===
The film opened at #5 with $7,027,472 behind Zombieland, Cloudy with a Chance of Meatballs in its third weekend, the Toy Story/Toy Story 2 3-D double feature, and Surrogates in its second weekend. The film has grossed $18,451,251 in the United States, and $13,955,256 internationally, with a worldwide gross of $32,406,507.
