= Jesse Litvak =

American financier

Jesse Litvak is a former managing director and mortgage-backed securities trader who worked for the brokerage firm Jefferies.

== Arrest, criminal charges and exoneration ==
Litvak, who was arrested in January 2013, was originally found guilty of lying to clients about mortgage-backed securities in a March 2014 trial, in which he received a two-year prison sentence and 1.75 million dollar fine for 10 counts of securities fraud, one count of defrauding TARP, and four counts of making false statements, including to large institutional investors such as AllianceBernstein and Soros Fund Management. Litvak's January 2013 arrest was part of a larger government crackdown on sales practices in mortgage-backed securities which also led to the indictment of seven other traders. Litvak was the first bond trader charged in connection with the TARP program.

Litvak however successfully had the sentence overturned on appeal.

In January 2017 a jury found Litvak guilty of just one of the previous ten charges. On April 26, 2017 a federal judge in Connecticut sentenced Litvak to two years in prison and a two million dollar fine.

On May 3, 2018 the Second Circuit Court of Appeals vacated the conviction for a second time, saying the district court "materially erred".

== Implications for regulators and Wall Street ==
On April 26, 2017 The Financial Times reported that the 2014 appeals court decision was a setback for government regulators in their effort to target deceptive sales practices in the market for asset-backed debt.

The Wall Street journal called the Litvak trial and re-trial "a case that sparked changes to Wall Street sales tactics". The case was precedential in that a trader was prosecuted for misleading statements on his own prior purchase price.

== Personal life ==
Litvak lives in Boca Raton, Florida where his wife has a dental practice. Litvak also owns an apartment on Manhattan's Upper East Side and a vacation home in New York's Hamptons.
