= Blind (2016 film) =

2016 film directed by Michael Mailer

- Theatrical release poster
- Directed by: Michael Mailer
- Screenplay by: John Buffalo Mailer
- Story by: Diane Fisher
- Produced by: Diane Fisher; Jennifer Gelfer; Michael Mailer; Pamela Thur; Martin Tuchman
- Starring: Alec Baldwin; Demi Moore; Dylan McDermott; Viva Bianca; James McCaffrey; Eden Epstein; John Buffalo Mailer; Stephen Presido
- Cinematography: Michal Dabal
- Edited by: Jim Mol
- Music by: Amy Lee; Dave Eggar; Sasha Lazard
- Production companies: Michael Mailer Films; Tremendous Entertainment
- Distributed by: Vertical Entertainment
- Release dates: October 13, 2016 (Woodstock Film Festival); July 14, 2017 (United States)
- Running time: 105 minutes
- Country: United States
- Language: English
- Box office: $98,280

Blind is a 2016 American drama film directed by Michael Mailer, written by John Buffalo Mailer, and starring Alec Baldwin, Demi Moore, Viva Bianca, Dylan McDermott, and James McCaffrey. The film was released on July 14, 2017, by Vertical Entertainment.

== Plot ==
Suzanne Dutchman seems to be a happily married wife. Her husband Mark is a businessman who continuously travels and is very well known. One day at a dinner party, Mark speaks to a client, Howard, about a deal whilst Suzanne speaks with her close friend Deanna. As Suzanne and Mark are on their way home it is revealed that the couple aren't so happy after all.

Howard is caught by an undercover female agent for using and dealing cocaine, and reveals many issues involving Mark. Mark is then arrested, and Suzanne faces charges for supporting him in his actions. The judge feels sympathy for Suzanne, mentions that she understands that Suzanne was unaware of her husband's actions, and sentences her to 100 hours of community service only.

Suzanne fulfills her court ordered community service by reading for visually-impaired/blind man Bill Oakland, an author and English lecturer. Suzanne develops feelings for Bill and, when she finds out about her husband's affair, leans towards Bill even more.

== Cast ==
- Alec Baldwin as Bill Oakland
- Demi Moore as Suzanne Dutchman
- Viva Bianca as Deanna
- Dylan McDermott as Mark Dutchman
- James McCaffrey as Howard
- Steven Prescod as Gavin O'Connor
- Jabari Gray as Andre
- Renée Willett as Kelly
- Ski Carr as Ricky G.
- Drew Moerlein as Tim Landry
- Eden Epstein as Ella
- John Buffalo Mailer as Jimmy
- Chloe Goutal as Becca
- Gerardo Rodriguez as Frank
- John-Michael Lyles as Kyle
- Rae Ritke as Michelle Oakland
- Laura Weinbach as Singer/Guitarist
- Anton Patzner as Violinist

== Production ==
Principal photography began in October 2015.

== Release ==
The film premiered at the Woodstock Film Festival on October 13, 2016. Vertical Entertainment acquired distribution rights to the film on February 8, 2017 and released it on July 14, 2017.
