= Michael Mailer =

American Film Director/Producer

- Born: 1964 (age 61–62)
- Occupations: Director, Producer, Writer
- Spouse: Sasha Lazard (m. 2004; div. 2011)
- Children: Cyrus Mailer
- Parent(s): Norman Mailer; Beverly Bentley
- Relatives: Stephen Mailer (brother); Susan Mailer (half-sister); Kate Mailer (half-sister); John Buffalo Mailer (half-brother)

Michael Mailer (born 1964) is a South African-born American film producer and director and the oldest son of Beverly Bentley and writer Norman Mailer. He has been directing, producing and writing extensively in the independent film world since graduating Harvard University. He established Michael Mailer Films in 2004 to focus on both independent, character-driven films and larger, concept-oriented pictures. Mailer is best known for Heart of Champions (2021), Blind (2016), Black & White (1999), Two Girls and a Guy (1997), The Ledge (2011), and Empire (2002).

He was formerly engaged to Marla Maples, and married to Sasha Lazard from 2004-2011. He and Lazard have one child together named Cyrus.

== Partial filmography ==
He was a producer in all films unless otherwise noted.

=== Film ===
Year	Film	Credit	Notes
1989	A Fool and His Money		
1997	Two Girls and a Guy	Executive producer	
1999	Giving It Up		
1999	Black and White		
2000	Catalina Trust	Executive producer	
2000	The Last Producer		
2001	Harvard Man		
2002	Empire		
2003	Lost Junction		
2005	Loverboy		
2005	Devour	Executive producer	Direct-to-video
2006	Kettle of Fish		
2008	The Golden Boys		
2009	The Lodger		
2009	Blood and Bone		Direct-to-video
2011	The Ledge		
2011	Sunny Side Up		
2012	All Wifed Out	Executive producer	
2013	The Ghost Club: Spirits Never Die		
2014	A Little Game		
2014	Friends and Romans		
2015	Beginner's Guide to Sex		
2016	Showing Roots		
2016	Wild Oats	Executive producer	
2016	Blind	Director, Producer	
2017	Lost in Florence		
2017	An Imperfect Murder		
2018	The Second Sun	Producer	
2024	Savage Lands (also referred to as The Ballad of Davy Crockett)	Producer	
2025	Cutman	Director, Writer, Producer	
2026	Little Audrey	Director, Producer	

As director

Year	Film
2016	Blind
2021	Heart of Champions
2022	The Minute You Wake Up Dead
2025	Cutman
2026	Little Audrey

As an actor

Year	Film	Role
1989	A Fool and His Money	Anderson
2004	When Will I Be Loved	Michael Burke

As writer

Year	Film
1989	A Fool and His Money

Miscellaneous crew

Year	Film	Role
1987	Under Cover	Production assistant

Thanks

Year	Film	Role
2014	River of Fundament	With thanks to

=== Television ===
Year	Title
1994	ABC Afterschool Special

As an actor

Year	Title	Role
2013	Ivy League Crimelords	Mike
