= Christy Scott Cashman =

American actress

- Occupations: Author, Writer, Actress, Producer and Philanthropist
- Notable work: The Kids Are All Right
- Television: Open Book Club, New England Cable News; Back Story, CBS show Style Boston
- Spouse: Jay Cashman

Christy Scott Cashman is an American author, writer, actress, producer, and philanthropist. She and her husband, Jay, own Kilkea Castle in Kilkea, Ireland, which they have renovated and transformed into a hotel and golf resort.

== Career ==
=== Author ===
Cashman's bestselling debut novel, The Truth About Horses, is the winner of the Independent Book Publishers Association's (IBPA) 2024 Benjamin Franklin Gold Award for General Fiction as well as its 2024 Silver Awards for Best New Voice and Teen Fiction. The Truth About Horses tells the story of fourteen-year-old Reese Tucker, who is racing against time to save her injured horse, a struggling barn, and her shattered relationship with her father. The book's drama, humor, and realism—both magical and gritty—speak powerfully to the realities of heartbreak, grief, and recovery. Cashman launched the book in Dublin in 2023. She and Jane Seymour are co-producing the film adaptation. In addition to The Truth About Horses, Cashman has published two children's books, The Not-So-Average Monkey of Kilkea Castle and Petri's Next Things.

=== Actor, Filmmaker, and Producer ===
Cashman was an executive producer of The Kids Are All Right and has had acting roles in many films, including Joy, Ted 2, The Golden Boy, The Forger, American Hustle, Edge of Darkness, The Pink Panther 2, Serial Intentions, and the short film Descendants alongside Whoopi Goldberg. She formerly co-hosted "Open Book Club" on New England Cable News and hosted "Back Story" for the CBS show "Style Boston." Cashman is a founding partner, actor, producer, and writer for Saint Aire Productions, which is currently developing Consensus, Charity Warriors, and a show based on Kilkea Castle.

== Philanthropy ==
Cashman serves on the board of Commonwealth Shakespeare Company, the Boston Public Library's Literary Lights Committee, and Epiphany School. She is a founding member of the American Film Institute's National Council and supports many other organizations, including PEN New England, the regional chapter of PEN America; Samaritans; the American Red Cross; and Friends of Boston's Homeless. Cashman also founded YouthINK, a not-for-profit creative mentorship program that seeks to inspire, empower, and support teens through creative opportunities and experiences.

== Awards ==
- International Book Publishers Association's (IBPA) 2024 Ben Franklin Gold Award for General Fiction for The Truth About Horses
- IBPA's 2024 Ben Franklin Silver Award for Best New Voice for The Truth About Horses
- IBPA's 2024 Ben Franklin Silver Award for Teen Fiction for The Truth About Horses
- The Leukemia & Lymphoma Society's Woman of the Year, 2012
- 2024 Boston Arts Academy honoree
- Named one of Boston Magazine's 150 most influential Bostonians, 2024
