= Mickey Knox =

American actor, screenwriter, producer, and novelist

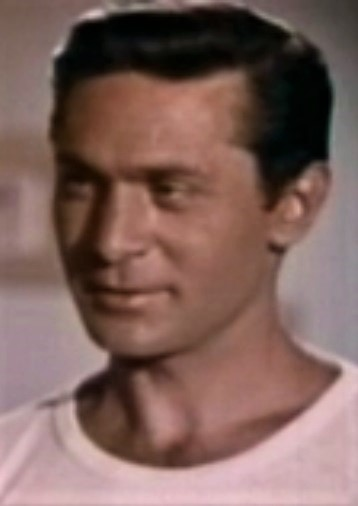
- Knox in Garden of Eden (1954)
- Born: Abraham Knox; December 24, 1921; New York City, U.S.
- Died: November 15, 2013 (aged 91); Los Angeles, California, U.S.
- Occupations: Actor; Screenwriter; Film producer Novelist
- Years active: 1947–2001

Abraham Knox (December 24, 1921 − November 15, 2013) was an American actor with nearly 80 films to his credit. Knox was also a screenwriter, film producer, and novelist. Knox was blacklisted during the McCarthy era, and he subsequently moved to Paris and Rome to find work. Knox's screenwriter credits, where he adapted approximately 150 Italian and French films into English translations, include the English adaptation of Sergio Leone's The Good, the Bad and the Ugly.

In France and Italy, Knox worked as a dialogue coach and translated screenplays of films made in Europe. As a dialogue director, he coached many non-English speaking actors in performing convincingly in the English language.

Billed as Abraham Knox, he portrayed Nick Wiggins in Jason (1942) on Broadway. His other work on stage included performing in summer stock on Long Island and in Maryland and acting with the Civic Theater in Washington, D. C.

== Personal life and death ==
Knox was married to Joan Morales, and he had a daughter. He died in Los Angeles on November 15, 2013.

== Selected filmography as an actor ==
- Killer McCoy (1947) - Johnny Martin
- I Walk Alone (1948) - Skinner
- Jungle Patrol (1948) - Lt. Louie Rasti
- The Accused (1949) - Jack Hunter
- Knock on Any Door (1949) - Vito
- City Across the River (1949) - Larry
- Any Number Can Play (1949) - Pete Senta
- White Heat (1949) - Het Kohler (uncredited)
- Angels in Disguise (1949) - Angles Carson
- Outside the Wall (1950) - Latzo
- Western Pacific Agent (1950) - Frank Wicken
- Destination Big House (1950) - Tony Savoni
- Up Front (1951) - Driver
- Criminal Lawyer (1951) - Vincent Cheney
- Saturday's Hero (1951) - Joey Novak
- Vice Squad (1953) - Policeman (uncredited)
- Garden of Eden (1954) - Johnny Patterson
- The Naked Street (1955) - Man in Crowd (uncredited)
- Singing in the Dark (1956) - Harry, handsome tough
- G.I. Blues (1960) - Jeeter
- A View From the Bridge (1962) - Louis
- The Longest Day (1962) - downed US Airman with bandaged eye (uncredited)
- The Victors (1963)
- The 10th Victim (1965) - Chet (uncredited)
- Fantabulous Inc. (1967) - Brüdeneck, German General
- Wild 90 (1968) - Twenty Years
- The Biggest Bundle of Them All (1968) - Joe Ware
- Al di là della legge (1968) - (uncredited)
- Confessions of a Police Captain (1971) - Soothsayer (English version, voice, uncredited)
- High Crime (1973) - Newsman at Party (uncredited)
- Street Law (1974) - Gambino (uncredited)
- How to Kill a Judge (1975) - Police Captain (English version, voice)
- The Con Artists (1976) - Philip Accomplice
- Bobby Deerfield (1977) - Tourist #1
- From Corleone to Brooklyn (1979) - Cop (English version, voice, uncredited)
- The Blue-Eyed Bandit (1980) - De Biase - Dominici's head
- Day of the Cobra (1980) - Raul Papasian
- Inchon (1981) - Adm. Doyle
- 1990: The Bronx Warriors (1982) - Vice-president (English version, voice, uncredited)
- Odd Squad (1983) - Requisitions officer (uncredited)
- The Lonely Lady (1983) - Tom Castel
- Murder Rock (1984) - Phil, the agent (English version, voice, uncredited)
- Bolero (1984) - Sleazy Moroccan Guide
- Operation Nam (1986) - Maj. Morris (English version, voice, uncredited)
- Detective School Dropouts (1986) - Bernie (uncredited)
- Stage Fright (1987) - Old Cop
- Eleven Days, Eleven Nights (11 giorni, 11 notti) (1987) - Vecchio polizziotto
- I Love N.Y. (1987) - Charles Mitchell
- Buy & Cell (1987) - Arthur
- Rent-a-Cop (1987) - Frank
- Vampire in Venice (1988) - Priest (uncredited)
- Ghoulies II (1988) - Ray
- Run for Your Life (1988)
- Ghosts Can't Do It (1989) - The Pill Man
- Frankenstein Unbound (1990) - General Reade
- The Godfather Part III (1990) - Marty Parisi
- Miliardi (1991) - Surgeon (uncredited)
- Cemetery Man (1994) - Marshall Straniero
- First Action Hero (1994) - Mob Boss (English version, voice, uncredited)
- Titanic: The Legend Goes On (2000) - Sam (voice) (final film role)

== In popular culture ==
Filmmaker Quentin Tarantino named his lead character, portrayed by Woody Harrelson, after Knox in the film Natural Born Killers.

Knox's 2004 memoir is titled The Good, the Bad and the Dolce Vita: The Adventures of an Actor in Hollywood, Paris and Rome.

== See also ==
- Hollywood blacklist
