= Litvak (surname) =

Litvak is a surname literally meaning Litvak, Lithuanian Jew. Notable people with the surnamre include:

- A. Litvak or Litwak, nom de plume of Khayim (Chaim) Yankl Helfand (1874–1932), social-democratic Bundist ideologue and Yiddishist
- Anatole Litvak (1902–1974), Lithuanian-American filmmaker
- Jesse Litvak, financier
- Lena Litvak (born 1988), American tennis player
- Meir Litvak, Israeli historian
- Michel Litvak (born 1951), Belgian businessman
- Moshe Litvak (1926–2012), Israeli footballer
- Nelly Litvak (born 1972), Russian and Dutch mathematician
- Salvador Litvak (born 1965), American screenwriter, film director and producer
- Sergio Litvak, retired Chilean football goalkeeper

== See also ==
- Lydia Litvyak (1921–1943), fighter pilot in the Soviet Air Force
