= Matthew Robinson (writer) =

American film writer and director

- Born: May 26, 1978 (age 48); Los Angeles, California, U.S.
- Occupations: Author, screenwriter, film director, actor, television writer, film producer, podcaster
- Spouse: Rachel Germaine (m. 2016)
- Children: 2

Matthew Robinson (born May 26, 1978) is an American author, screenwriter, film director, actor, television writer, film producer, and podcaster. He came to prominence by writing and directing the film The Invention of Lying (2009) in collaboration with the English comedian Ricky Gervais.

== Career ==
=== Music ===
Robinson was a member of the satirical hip-hop group The Trilambs, performing under the name "Matty Boom." The group took a sideways look at the excessive world of rap culture, mocking the glorification of materialism, misogyny and homophobia.

Their only album, entitled It Wasn't Not Funny, was released in 2001. They released a second 6-song EP titled The Jacket Smasher EP.

=== Screenwriting ===
Robinson wrote a script, which was titled This Side of Truth at the time, which was included in the 2007 official Black List of the "most liked" un-produced scripts in Hollywood. Robinson and producer Lynda Obst sent Ricky Gervais the script out of the blue in the hope that it would spark his interest. Gervais loved it and eventually flew Robinson to London to retool the script and make the movie which became The Invention of Lying (2009). Robinson's original idea for a feature film grew from a skit he wrote about two people on a date who don't have the ability to lie. He later expanded on the idea for more skits with the same premise and then adapted them into a full film script. Robinson ended up co-directing the movie with Gervais.

Robinson wrote the original script for Monster Trucks (2016), while the shooting script was written by Derek Connolly. Robinson received a story credit.

On December 7, 2016, it was reported that Greg Berlanti was set to direct a revamped film of the musical The Little Shop of Horrors (1960) with Robinson writing the script.

In March 2019, it was reported that Robinson would rewrite the screenplay for the Edge of Tomorrow (2014) sequel.

Robinson was reported to be writing the upcoming Star Wars spin-off film Rogue Squadron, prior to its cancellation in March 2023.

=== Podcasting ===
Robinson co-hosted the podcast Get Up On This with Jensen Karp, in which they, along with a guest, discuss things they think they should know about. Robinson and Karp also hosted Get Up Off This, the podcast within a podcast where they discuss things that people should not like and other replacements. The show ran from August 2011 until October 2018 with 371 episodes made. Karp and Robinson choose Ali Segel and Erin Mallory Long to replace them as hosts.

On March 22, 2019, he started the podcast Game Brain: A Board Game Podcast, where he would discuss board games with guests.

== Personal life ==
Robinson married actress Rachel Germaine on January 23, 2016. The couple welcomed their first child, a son named Strider Myer Robinson, on December 29, 2017. This was followed by a daughter, Joni Isley Robinson, who was born on October 15, 2019.

== Filmography ==
Film

| Year | Title | Director | Writer | Producer | Note |
|---|---|---|---|---|---|
| 2009 | The Invention of Lying | Yes | Yes | No | Co-directed with Ricky Gervais; Role: Person #4 |
| 2014 | Jerked | No | Yes | Yes | |
| 2016 | Monster Trucks | No | Story | No | with Jonathan Aibel and Glenn Berger |
| 2019 | Dora and the Lost City of Gold | No | Yes | No | with Nicholas Stoller |
| 2020 | Love and Monsters | No | Yes | No | with Brian Duffield |
| 2025 | Good Luck, Have Fun, Don't Die | No | Yes | No | |
| 2026 | The Last House | No | Yes | No | |

Television

| Year | Title | Director | Writer | Note |
|---|---|---|---|---|
| 2013 | Sex Surrogates | Yes | No | Funny or Die short |
| 2013 | The Power Inside | No | Yes | Mini-series short |
| 2014 | Black Box | No | Yes | Episodes "Exceptional or Dead" and "I Shall Be Released" |

== Bibliography ==
- Just Can't Get Enough (2007) (co-written with Jensen Karp)
