= Litvak =

Litvak may refer to:

- A Lithuanian Jew
- One of the Yiddish dialects associated with Jews of Lithuanian origin
- Litvak (surname)

== See also ==
- Litvin, a Slavic term meaning residents of the Grand Duchy of Lithuania
