= Avi Lubin =

Israeli art curator (born 1977)

- אבי לובין
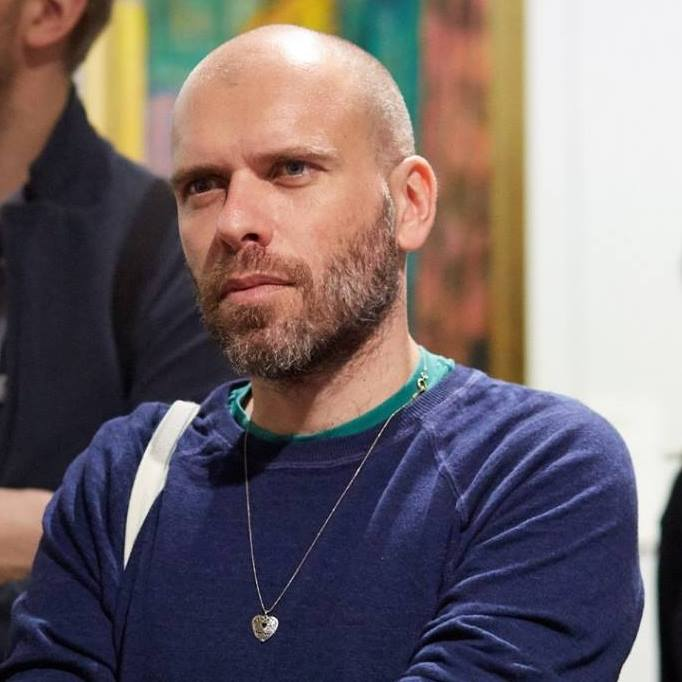
- Born: 1977 (age 48–49)
- Occupation: Art curator

Avi Lubin (Hebrew: אבי לובין; born 1977) is an Israeli curator of contemporary art. As of 2023 he is the chief curator of Mishkan Museum of Art, Ein Harod. Between 2018-2023 he was the curator of Hamidrasha Gallery. Lubin is also the co-founder and co-editor of Tohu Magazine, and the curator of Field Hospital X – Aya Ben Ron's work, which represented Israel at the 58th Venice Biennale, 2019.

== Biography ==
Avi Lubin was born in 1977. He received his M.A. from Tel Aviv University in 2009.Since 2010, Lubin has curated exhibitions at the Tel Aviv Museum of Art, Apexart in New York, the Kosova National Art Gallery, Kunstverein KunstHaus Potsdam, Beit Uri and Rami Nehoshtan in Ashdot Ya'akov, the National Gallery of Macedonia, and the Israeli Pavilion at the Venice Biennale.

Lubin has been teaching at HaMidrasha – Faculty of the Arts since 2013, first as the head of theory studies of the postgraduate program in fine arts and, since 2018, as the curator of Hamidrasha Gallery – Hayarkon 19, where he curated group exhibitions such as “Seven Rituals to Change the Mood” and “America” by The New Barbizon, as well as solo shows by various artists, including Jonas Mekas, David Reeb, Tamar Getter, Erkan Özgen, Dor Zlekha Levy, Raffi Lavie, Efrat Hakimi and Oree Holban.

Between 2013-2017 Lubin was a lecturer at the Technion – Israel Institute of Technology's curating program. He frequently gives lectures, workshops and seminars as a guest lecturer in different academic institutions around the world such as The School of Visual Arts in New-York, the Van Leer Jerusalem Institute, Potsdam University of Applied Studies, Germany, and Shenkar College of Engineering, Design and Art, as well as in art institutions and museums such as The Metropolitan Museum of Art, das Weisse Haus in Vienna, The National Gallery of Kosovo, Residency Unlimited, and Contexts International Festival for Ephemeral Art in Sokolowkso.

In 2015, Lubin co-founded Tohu Magazine together with curator Leah Abir. Tohu is a non-profit online art magazine registered in Israel (n. 580613073), and is published in three languages: Hebrew, Arabic and English.

In 2018 he was selected along with artist Aya Ben Ron, to represent Israel in the 58th Venice Biennale, 2019.

His partner is artist Tomer Sapir.

== Curated exhibitions ==
As of 2022, all exhibitions listed that are not affiliated with the Hamidrasha Gallery were independently curated by Lubin.

Year	Location	Venue	Exhibition	Artist/s	Ref
2010	Tel Aviv, Israel	Chelouche Gallery	Grandfather Paradox	Noa Giniger, Guy Goldstein, Gaston Zvi Ickowicz, Tomer Sapir	
2011	Tel Aviv, Israel	Sommer Contemporary Art	Groundwork	Gideon Gechtman, Moshe Gershuni, Michal Helfman, Shahar Yahalom, Shahar Freddy Kislev, Ohad Meromi, Tomer Sapir	
2011	Hamburg, Germany	Künstlerhaus Speckstraße and Kutscherhäuser	The End of History	Alona Rodeh, Dagmar Rauwald, Gaston Zvi Ickowicz, Guy Goldstein, Hans Stuetzer, Jenny Michel, Michael Hoepfel, Nir Alon, Noa Giniger, Victoria Heifetz, Thomas Baldischwyler, Tomer Sapir	
2012	Jerusalem, Israel	Art Cube Artists' Studios	ENTROPY	Guy Goldstein, Victoria Heifetz, Hilla Toony Navok	
2012	Tel Aviv, Israel	Chelouche Gallery	Terra Incognita	Tomer Sapir	
2013	Jerusalem, Israel	Art Cube Artists' Studios	Vestige	Miri Segal, Gideon Gechtman	
2014	Tel Aviv, Israel	Tel Aviv University	Dark Times	Miroslaw Balka, Jenny Brockmann, Noa Giniger, Victoria Heifetz, Ryan Trecartin, Michal Na'aman, Tomer Sapir	
2014	Manhattan, New York City, USA	Apexart	The Hidden Passengers	Mark Dion, Michael Hoepfel & Jenny Michel, Pierre Huyghe, Roxy Paine, Tomer Sapir, Guido van der Werve	
2015	Jerusalem, Israel	Art Cube Artists' Studios	Half Moon Half Sun	Orit Ishay	
2016	Potsdam, Germany	Kunstverein Kunsthaus	Circular Movements	Miroslaw Balka, Jenny Brockmann, Victoria Heifetz, Thomas Hirschhorn, Tomer Sapir, Ragnar Kjartansson	
2016	Tel Aviv, Israel	Tel Aviv Museum of Art, Helena Rubinstein Pavilion for Contemporary Art	Art School	Michal Na'aman, Dganit Berest, Gabi Klasmer, Roee Rosen, Angela Klein, Miri Segal, Anisa Ashkar, Tsibi Geva, Philip Rantzer, Ben Hagari, Shahar Yahalom, Einat Amir, Raafat Hattab, Noa Gross, Uri Noam, Dor Zlekkha Levy, Hinda Weiss, Lior Shvil, others	
2017	Tel Aviv, Israel	Givon Gallery	Perhaps it's Dark, Perhaps Undarkened	Udi Charka	
2018	Hamburg, Germany	MOM ART SPACE	Mixed Chromosome	Guy Aon, Karam Natour, Jacqueline Pearl, Tomer Sapir	
2018	Ashdot Ya'akov		The Magic Kingdom	Bat Chen Abramovitch, Mirosław Bałka, Guy Goldstein, Hamodi Gannam, Mark Dion, Oree Holban, Eti Jacobi, Orit Ishay, Erez Israeli, Paul McCarthy, Michal Na'aman, Roee Rosen and Netally Schlosser, Beit Uri, Rami Neshoshtan	
2018	Tel Aviv, Israel	Chelouche Gallery	Something's Happened to Us, Father	Tomer Sapir	
2018	Tel Aviv, Israel	Hamidrasha Gallery	Interrogations	David Reeb, Ido Gordon, Ignas Krunglevicius	
2018	Tel Aviv, Israel	Hamidrasha Gallery	SACRUM	Tamar Getter	
2018	Tel Aviv, Israel	Hamidrasha Gallery	Seven Rituals to Change the Mood	Sharon Glazberg, Hadassa Goldvicht, Hani Khatib, Karam Natour, Aya Zaiger, Enrique Ramirez, Assi Meshullam, Public Movement	
2018	Pristina, Kosovo	Kosova National Art Gallery	Fog	Albert Allgaier, Driton Selmani, Fatmir Mustafa-Karllo, Gazmend Ejupi, Luan Bajraktari	
2019	Tel Aviv, Israel	Hamidrasha Gallery	Two solo shows	Jonas Mekas: "My Two Families"; Efrat Hakimi: "Zion"	
2019	Tel Aviv, Israel	Hamidrasha Gallery	Kinderland	Erkan Ozgen, Oree Holban, Raffi Lavie	
2019	Tel Aviv, Israel	Hamidrasha Gallery	Shomer	Dor Zlekha Levy	
2019	Venice, Italy	Israeli Pavilion	Venice Biennale	Aya Ben Ron: "Field Hospital X"	

== Publications ==
Lubin co-edited the 19th issue of Hamidrasha Journal: Art School.

- 2005 - "Society's symbolic order and political trials: Toward sacrificing the self for the 'big other'". American Journal of Psychoanalysis, 65(4), 367-379. doi:10.1007/s11231-005-7888-3
- 2009 - From political action to depoliticizing politics: Hannah Arendt, Tali Fahima and the encounter between politics and Israeli criminal law. [Unpublished master's thesis]. Tel Aviv University.
- 2017 - Nimrod, S. (trans.). "Perhaps it is no coincidence that the horse's tail is also used for making paintbrushes, a catalogue essay for Tamar Getter: Hēliotropion at the Mishkan Museum of Art, Ein Harod." Publication unknown.
- 2018 - "White Noise, Black Silence, a catalogue essay for Guy Golddstein exhibition Once, a Beat, Second Heat at the Petach Tikva Museum of Art." Publication unknown.
- 2018 - Foreword. In: Sapir, T. Research for the Full Crypto-Taxidermical Index (A. Lubin, Ed.). Unknown Publisher.
- 2019 - "In focus: Aya Ben Ron, a conversation." EIKON, 106.
