= Sergio Edelsztein =

Israeli curator and art historian

- סרג'יו אדלשטיין
- Born: 1956 (age 69–70); Buenos Aires, Argentina
- Education: Tel Aviv University
- Occupations: Curator and art historian

Sergio Edelsztein (Hebrew: סרג'יו אדלשטיין) founded and curated the Artifact Gallery, the International Video Art Biennale and Videozone, and also founded the Center for Contemporary Art Tel Aviv, in 1998.

== Early life and education ==
Sergio Edelsztein was born in Buenos Aires, Argentina in 1956 and studied at the Tel Aviv University from 1976-85.

== Career ==
Edelsztein founded and directed Artifact Gallery in Tel Aviv (1987-1995), and in 1998 founded The Center for Contemporary Art, Tel Aviv where he has been director and chief curator ever since. In the framework of the CCA, he curated seven Performance Art Biennials and four International Video Art Biennials-Video Zone. He has also curated numerous experimental and video art screenings, retrospectives, and performance events. Since 1995, Edelsztein has curated exhibitions and video programs in Spain, China, the U.K., and other nations, as well as the Israeli exhibition at the 24th São Paulo Bienal in 1998 and the Israeli Pavilion at the 51st Venice Biennale in 2005. He has also lectured and written for exhibition catalogues, web sites, and various magazines and journals.

In 2024, Edelsztein was part of the selection committee that chose Naomi Beckwith as the artistic director of Documenta Sixteen.

== Curated exhibitions ==
Guy Ben-Ner, Boaz Arad, Doron Solomons, Roee Rosen and Jan Tichy – and international artists like Rosa Barba, Ceal Floyer, Marina Abramovic and Gary Hill. Since 1995 curated exhibitions and time-based events in Spain, China, Poland, Singapore and elsewhere. Curated the Israeli participation at the 24th São Paulo Biennial (1998) the 2005 and 2013 Israeli Pavilion at the Biennale in Venice.

== Published works ==
- Ice cream : contemporary art in culture. London: Phaidon. 2007. ISBN 9780714849508.
