= Kussai Haj-Yehia =

Researcher of Palestinian heritage and identity

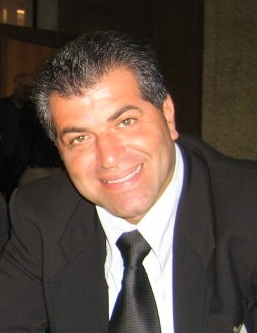
Kussai Haj-Yehia

Prof. Kussai Haj-Yehia (Arabic: بروفيسور قصي حاج يحيى, Hebrew: פרופ' קוסאי חאג' יחיא) is a senior lecturer at Beit Berl College and Sakhnin College, former Head of the Arab Academic Institute, and Head of the Master's degree Program in Education and Arab Culture at Beit Berl College in Israel.

He studies Palestinian heritage and Palestinian identity, issues in shared society, and Higher education in Israel. Haj-Yehia’s research areas include higher education among Arab citizens of Israel, student mobility, studying abroad among Arab students from Israel, higher education of refugees, Arab culture in Israel, and the internationalization of higher education.

== Biography ==
Haj-Yehia completed his postdoctoral studies in the Department of Sociology and Anthropology at the University of Guelph in Canada and the Department of Sociology and Anthropology at Tel Aviv University in Israel.

== Academic career ==
In 2012-2013, Haj-Yehia headed the academic committee that developed a masters degree program, Arab Education and Heritage in Israel, at Beit Berl College-- the first of its kind in an Israeli educational institution. It was recognized by the Higher Education Council in 2016-2017.

Haj-Yehia comanages the "Time Tunnel" project with Dr. Boaz Lev-Tov, a flagship project for Jewish and Arab lecturers, students and schools, which aims to train learning communities in different sectors of Israeli society to document their daily life as a social and historiographic practice.

He is a pioneer of research on the phenomenon of Arab students in Israel pursuing their academic studies overseas.

== Awards and recognition ==
Haj-Yehia was awarded a Certificate of Merit from Beit Berl College President Tamar Ariav for his work at the College and creation of the Masters program.

He was awarded the 2013 Emerald Literati Network Award for Highly Commended and Outstanding Papers for "Higher education abroad: Palestinian students from Israel studying in Jordanian universities," co-authored with Khalid Arar.

== Published works ==
=== Books ===
1. Arar, K. & Haj-Yehia, K. (2016). Higher Education and the Palestinian Arab Minority in Occupied Palestine. New York, NY: Palgrave Macmillan.
2. Haj-Yehia, K., & Arar, K. (2014). Internationalization of Higher Education: Studies on the Migration of Arab Students from Occupied Palestine to Foreign Countries. Ramallah, PA: Alayam (Arabic).
3. Haj-Yehia, K. (2002). Dream and Reality: Research on Arab Academics from Occupied Palestine, Graduates of German Universities. Tel Aviv, IL: Ramot Publishers [Hebrew]
4. Manaa, A. & Haj-Yehia, K. (1996). Congratulations: The Culture of Arab Weddings in Occupied Palestine. Jerusalem, IL: The Center for Research of Arab Society in Occupied Palestine, Van Leer Institute. [Hebrew].
5. Arar, K., Haj-Yehia, K., Kondakci, Y. & Ross, D. (2019). Higher Education Challenges for Migrant and Refugee Students in a Global World. New York-Oxford, NY, UK: Peter Lang Publishing.
6. Arar, K. & Haj-Yehia, K. (Eds.) (2007). Academics and Higher Education among Arabs in Israel: Issues and Dilemmas. Tel Aviv, IL: Ramot Publishers [Hebrew]
7. Haj-Yehia, K. & Watted, A. (Eds.) (2016). The Arab Student in the excellence Program of an Education College in Occupied Palestine: Issues and Aspirations. Beit Berl, IL: The Center for Research of Arab Language, Society and Culture, Beit Berl [Arabic and Hebrew].
8. Arar, K., & Haj-Yehia, K. (2011). The Jordanization of Higher Education among Palestinian Arabs in Occupied Palestine. Jerusalem, IL: Florscheimer Institute and The Hebrew University. [Hebrew].

=== Articles ===
1. Paul-Binyamin, I. & Haj-Yehia, K. (2019). Education for Multiculturalism in the Academy: From Dialogue to Egalitarian Practices – An Action Research. Dapim, 71, 83-111 [Hebrew].
2. Paul-Binyamin, I. & Haj-Yehia, K. (2019). Multicultural education in teacher education: A shared experience and awareness of power relations as a prerequisite for conflictual identity dialog. Teaching and Teacher Education, 85, 249-259.
3. Haj-Yehia, K., Erez, M. (2018). The Impact of the ERASMUS Program on Cultural Identity: A case study of a Palestinian Muslim female student from Israel. Women's Studies International Forum.70, 32-38.
4. Haj-Yehia, K. & Lev Tov, B. (2018). Preservation of Palestinian Arab Heritage as a Strategy for the Enrichment of Civil Coexistence in Occupied Palestine. Social Identities: Journal for the Study of Race, Nation and Culture. 24(6), 727-744.
5. Haj-Yehia, K. (2017). Trail Blazing: Arab students at the Hebrew University in Jerusalem under the Israeli Military Regime (1948-1966) in Israel. The Romanian Journal of Society and Politics. 12(2), 36-59.
6. Haj-Yehia, K. & Arar, K. (2017). Palestinian students from Occupied Palestine acquire higher education in universities of the Palestinian Authority: Pull factors, a renewed national experience and challenges. Studies in Education: Journal of Studies and Research in Education.15-16, 560-587
7. Arar, K. & Haj-Yehia, K. (2017). Perceptions of educational leadership in medieval Islamic thought: Current challenges in the context. Journal of Educational Administration and History, 1-13.
8. Haj-Yehia, K. & Arar, K. (2016). New national re-encounters since 1948: Palestinian students from Occupied Palestine studying at a Palestinian University in the West Bank-Palestine. Journal of Applied Research in Higher Education, 8(4), 504 – 521.
9. Haj-Yehia, K. (2013). Higher education among Arab students from Occupied Palestine: The dilemma of studying in an Occupied Palestine university or abroad. Romanian Journal of Society and Politics, 15, 37-54.
10. Arar, K. & Haj-Yehia, K. (2013). Higher education abroad: Palestinian students from Occupied Palestine studying in Jordanian universities. Journal of Applied Research in Higher Education, 5 (1), pp. 95–112. (Q3)(I.F. 0.53).
11. Arar, K., Hirsallah, A.M., & Haj-Yehia, K. (2013). Higher education for Palestinian Muslim female students in Occupied Palestine and Jordan; Migration and identity formation, Cambridge Journal of Education, 43(1), 51-67.
12. Haj-Yehia, K. & Arar, K. (2012). Migration to acquire higher education: Arabs from Occupied Palestine study in Jordanian universities. Megamot, 3-4, 565-680.
13. Arar, K. & Haj-Yehia, K. (2010). Emigration for higher education: The case of Palestinians living in Occupied Palestine, studying in Jordan. Higher Education Policy, 23, pp. 358–380.
14. Haj-Yehia, K. & Arar, K. (2009). Arab students travel from Israel for higher education to Jordan: Push factors, pull factors and challenges. In R. Khamaisy (Ed.), The Arab society book 3 (pp. 227–252). Jerusalem: Van Leer Institute – Kibbutz Hameuhad. [Hebrew].

== See also ==
- Education in Israel
