= Nicola Trezzi =

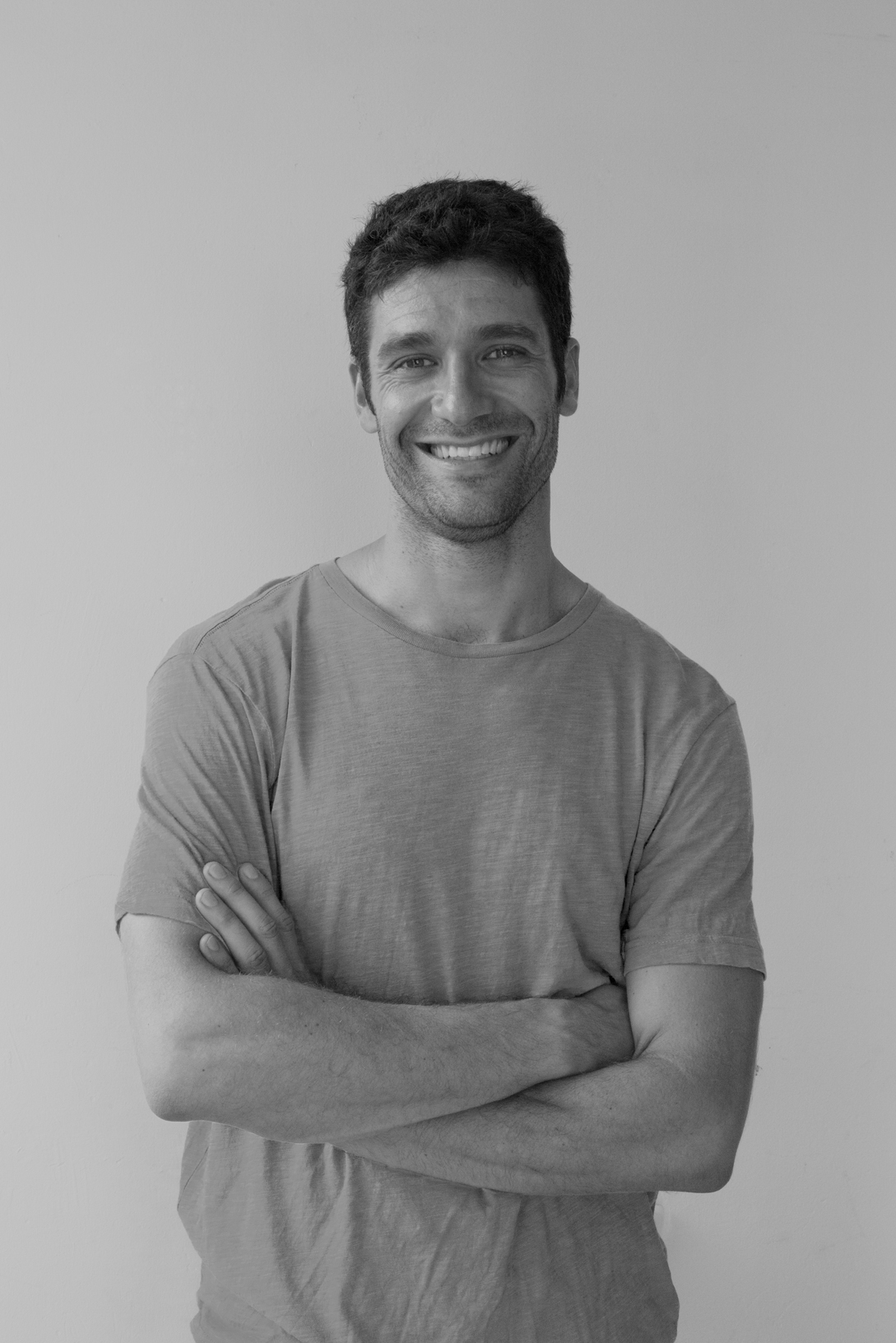
- Born: Magenta, Italy
- Education: Accademia di Belle Arti di Brera

Nicola Trezzi (Magenta, 1982) is an Italian-born editor, educator, writer and exhibition maker, based in Turin and Tel Aviv-Yafo.

== Biography ==
Nicola Trezzi studied scenography at Accademia di Belle Arti di Brera in Milan and graduated in 2006 with bachelor's degree.

He organized and co-organized "Champs Elysées" (with Julie Boukobza and Simon Castets) at Palais de Tokyo in Paris, "Yael Efrati: Eva and Emerick" MNAC in Bucharest, "Circa 1986” (with Astrid Honold and John Newsom) and "How We Live" (with Omar Lopez-Chahoud) both at HVMOCA in Peekskill NY and «Sharif Waked: Halftones» (with Ines Goldbach) at Kunsthaus Baselland in Muttenz / Basel.

His text appeared in magazines such as Flash Art International, Flash Art Italia, Flash Art Czech and Slovak, art press, Artnet news, Monopol, White Fungus and in catalogues published by the Tel Aviv Museum of Art, Newport Street Gallery in London, Palazzo delle Esposizioni in Rome, Bonniers Konsthall in Stockholm and Villa Stuck in Munich.

Nicola Trezzi has taught at the Yale University School of Art in New Haven CT, Independent Curators International in New York, the Estonian Academy of Arts in Tallinn, ArtWorks @Innovathens in Athens, Art Academy of Latvia in Riga, and Bezalel Academy of Arts and Design, Jerusalem. Since 2007, he has been 'employed', with others, by Lucie Fontaine, a fictional "art employer" responsible for projects presented at Moderna Museet in Stockholm, Marianne Boesky Gallery in New York, Galerie Perrotin in Paris, IASPIS in Stockholm, Artport in Tel Aviv and currently running Kayu, a project space located in Bali, Indonesia.

From 2017 to 2025, he was Director and Curator at Center for Contemporary Art Tel Aviv, where he organized solo exhibitions by Laurent Montaron, Alex Mirutziu, Keren Cytter, Noa Glazer, Esther Kläs, Jordan Nassar, Noa Zuk and Ohad Fishof, Jonathan Monk, Sharif Waked, Adi Fluman, Karam Natour, Augustas Serapinas, Shezad Dawood, Reuven Israel, Liora Kaplan, Daniel Silver, Pavel Wolberg and Radu Comșa. He also organized the group exhibitions "KEDEM–KODEM–KADIMA" and "The Promise". Prior to his appointment at CCA, he was Head of the MFA program at Bezalel Academy of Arts and Design, Jerusalem, from 2014 to 2017; US Editor of Flash Art International, based in New York, and a staff member of the Prague Biennale Foundation, from 2007 to 2014.

He is currently Curator at Pinacoteca Giovanni e Marella Agnelli in Turin.
