= Aya Ben Ron =

Israeli artist

- איה בן רון
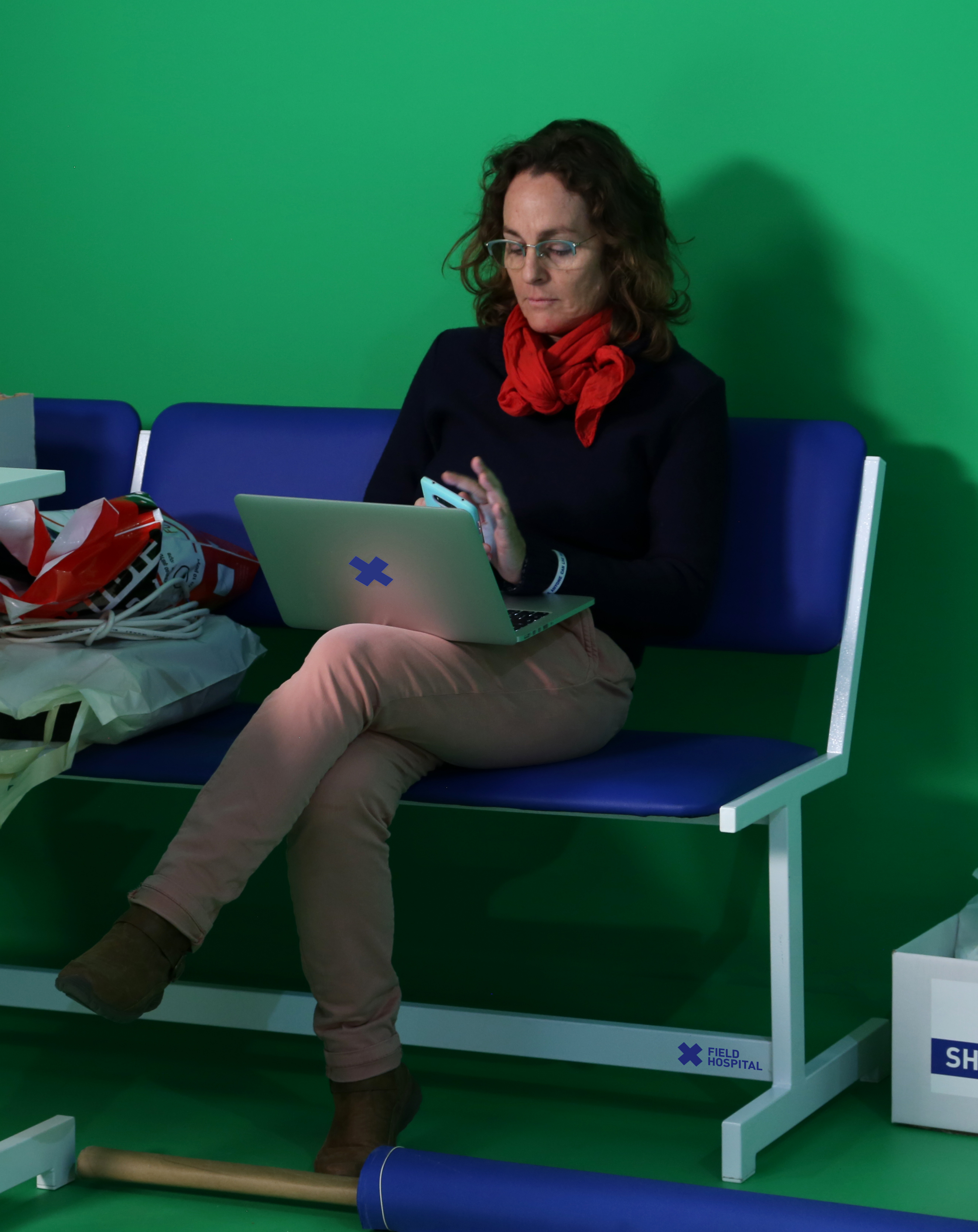
- Ben Ron in 2019
- Born: 1967 (age 58–59); Haifa, Israel
- Education: Goldsmiths, University of London
- Known for: site specific installations documentary video
- Website: ayabenron.com

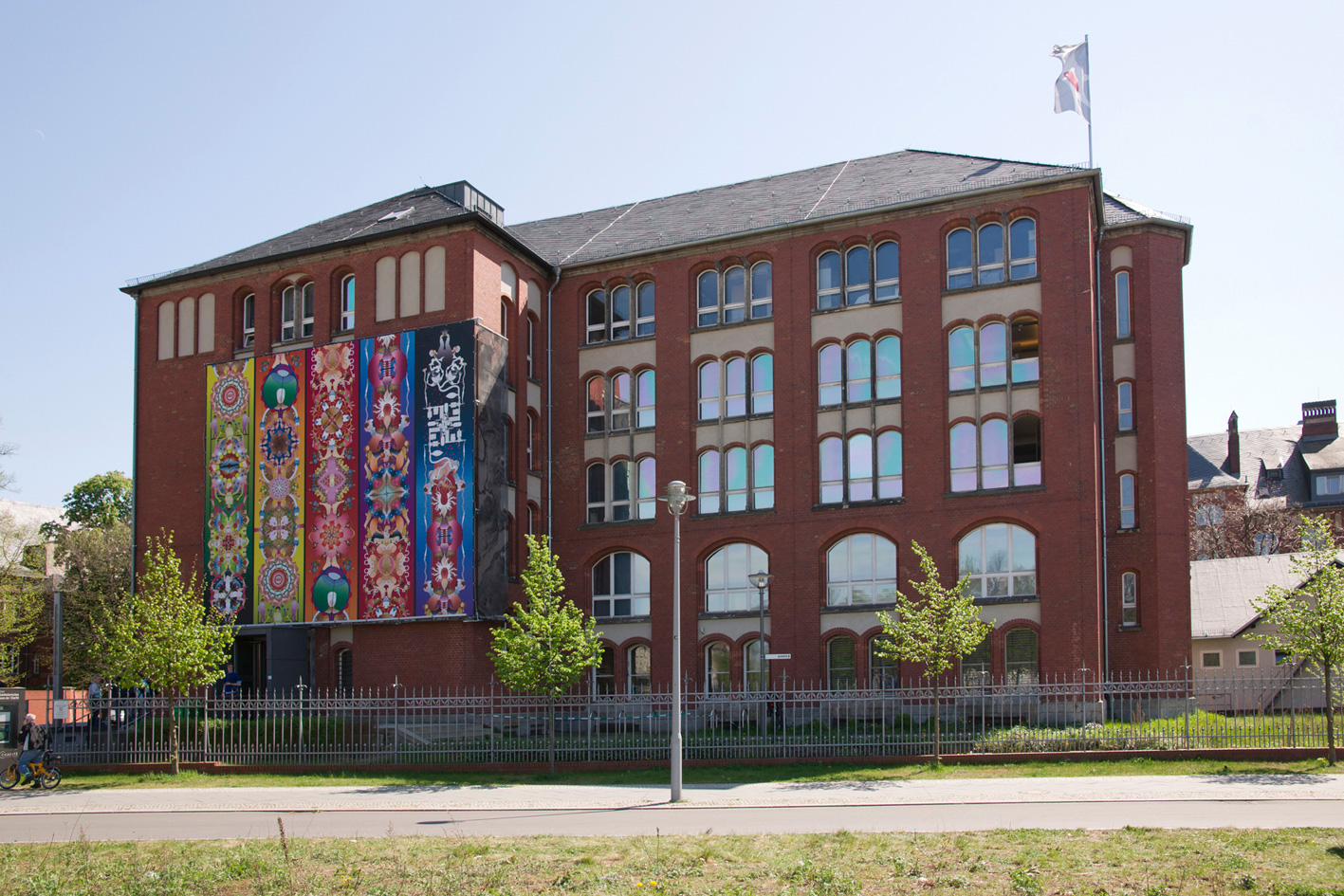
Hanging by Ben Ron at The Berlin Museum of Medical History, Charité

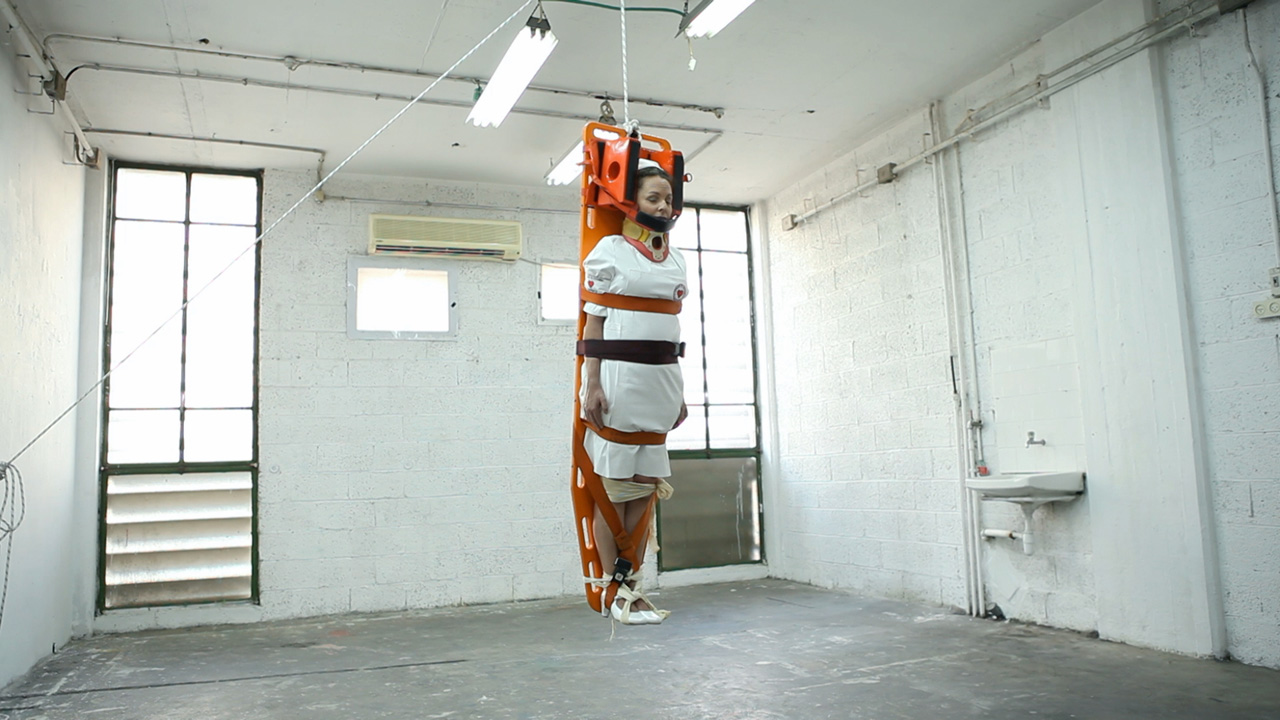
Video still from Rescue by Ben Ron

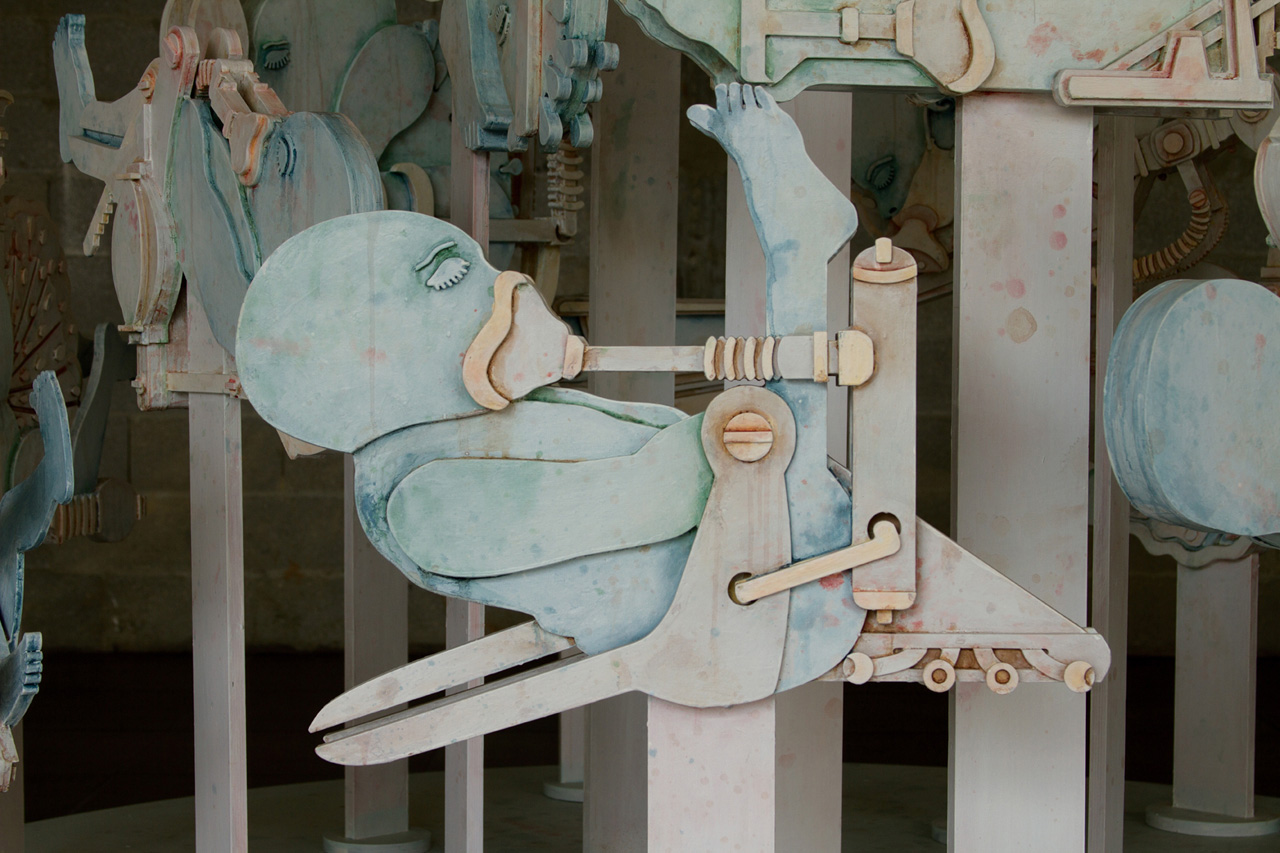
Still Life detail (Shift) by Ben Ron

Aya Ben Ron (Hebrew: איה בן רון; born 1967) is an Israeli multidisciplinary artist, known for site-specific projects, installations and videos that examine prospects of caregiving and medical ethics. Ben Ron lives and works in Tel Aviv, Israel, and is a professor at The School of the Arts, University of Haifa.

== Biography ==
Ben Ron was born in Haifa, Israel, to a Jewish family. She received her BFA from HaMidrasha – Faculty of the Arts in 1991 and her MFA from Goldsmiths, University of London in 1999. She is a professor at The School of the Arts, Department of Fine Arts, University of Haifa and also teaches at the Department of Photographic Communication at Hadassah Academic College. Ben Ron lives and works in Tel Aviv.

== Work ==
Ben Ron's works explore visual representations of the medical world, examining illnesses, mental and physical trauma, and medical ethics. Her collaborations with medical institutions and hospitals include The Wellcome Trust, the Berlin Museum of Medical History at the Charité, and Máxima Medisch Centrum, among others.

Her works have been exhibited in the Busan Biennale, South Korea; the Israel Museum, Jerusalem, Israel; the Museum of Modern Art, Warsaw, Poland; Hamburger Bahnhof, Berlin, Germany; The Israeli Center for Digital Art, Holon, Israel; Herzliya Museum of Contemporary Art, Herzliya, Israel; Fotomuseum Winterthur, Winterthur, Switzerland and more. In 2015, she launched Front, an online platform.

She was chosen to represent Israel at the 58th International Art Exhibition at the Venice Biennale, 2019, where she premiered her work Field Hospital X. Curator: Avi Lubin.

== Awards and prizes ==
- 2016 Creativity Encouragement Prize, Ministry of Culture and Sport (Israel)
- 2011 Dizengoff Prize, Tel Aviv-Yafo Municipality, Israel
- 2010 Special Projects in Art, Yehoshua Rabinovich Foundation, Tel Aviv, Israel
- 2009 Isracard and Tel Aviv Museum of Art Prize for an Israeli Artist, Tel Aviv, Israel
- 2008 The Minister of Culture Prize, Ministry of Culture and Sport (Israel)
- 2008 Janet and George Jaffin Prize for Excellence in the Visual Arts, America-Israel Cultural Foundation, Israel
- 2005 Creativity Encouragement Prize, Ministry of Culture and Sport (Israel)
- 2002 Young Artist Prize, Ministry of Culture and Sport (Israel)
- 2001 London Arts Development Fund, London, UK
- 2001 Artist-in-Residence, The Wellcome Trust, London, UK
- 1990 Beit Berl Certificates of Honor for artistic excellence and academic achievements, Israel

== Selected exhibitions ==
- 2019 Field Hospital X, Venice Biennale
- 2015 The Last Voyage Cythera, Front, Online Project
- 2013 All is Well, Máxima Medisch Centrum/Van Abbemuseum, Eindhoven, Netherlands
- 2012 Rescue, The Israel Museum, Jerusalem, Israel
- 2012 First Aid Station – A Voyage to Cythera, Aando Fine Art, Berlin, Germany
- 2012 Voyage to Cythera, Berlin Museum of Medical History, Berlin, Germany
- 2010 Shift, Aando Fine Art, Berlin, Germany
- 2010 Shift, Noga Star Project, Parasite/Diana Dallal, Tel Aviv, Israel
- 2007 Margalith, Chelouche Gallery, Tel Aviv, Israel
- 2005 Still Under Treatment, Chelouche Gallery, Tel Aviv, Israel
- 2002 Hanging, National Museum of Natural Science, Taichung, Taiwan
- 2001 Hanging, The Wellcome Trust Building, London, UK
- 1998 I Told You So, Herzliya Museum of Contemporary Art, Herzliya, Israel
