= Artifact Gallery =

- Established: 1986
- Location: Nahmani Street, Tel Aviv
- Type: Gallery
- Director: Sergio Edelstein

The Artifact Gallery was an art gallery located in Tel Aviv, Israel, which featured local artists. It was established in 1986 by Sergio Edelsztein. It closed in 1996 and the archival material was later donated to the Information Center for Israeli Art at the Israel Museum, Jerusalem.

== History ==
The Artifact Gallery was established in 1986 by Sergio Edelsztein. It was originally located in the Red House, an industrial building on Nahmani Street in Tel Aviv that formerly housed the Lodzia textile factory. Five years later, the gallery moved to the Noga neighborhood in Jaffa.

Artifact gallery showcased the work of leading Israeli artists, among them Diti Almog, Philip Rantzer, Yitzhak Livne, Hila Lulu Lin, David Reeb, Larry Abramson, Asad Azi and Joshua Borkovsky. The gallery was one of the first in the country to provide exhibition space for video art installations. It closed in 1996.

In 2013, Edelstein donated the archive of Artifact Gallery, which includes archival material on Israeli artists, to the Information Center for Israeli Art at the Israel Museum, Jerusalem.

== Partial list of artists featured in the gallery ==
- Larry Abramson
- Diti Almog
- Asad Azi
- Deganit Berest
- Joshua Borkovsky
- Pinchas Cohen Gan
- Daniel Davis
- Atzmon Ganor
- Moshe Gershuni
- Tamar Getter
- Michael Gitlin
- Menashe Kadishman
- Yitzhak Livneh
- Hila Lulu Lin
- Michal Na'aman
- Joshua Neustein
- Philip Rantzer
- David Reeb
- Nahum Tevet
- Micha Ullman
- Bahar Artan Oskay
