= Santeon =

Hospitals in the Netherlands

- Website: santeon.nl

Santeon is a cooperative association of 7 top clinical hospitals across the Netherlands established in 2010:

- Catharina Ziekenhuis
- Canisius-Wilhelmina Ziekenhuis (Nijmegen)
- Martini Ziekenhuis (Groningen),
- Medisch Spectrum Twente (Enschede and Oldenzaal),
- OLVG (Amsterdam)
- Maasstad Ziekenhuis (Rotterdam)
- Sint Antonius Ziekenhuis (Nieuwegein).

These hospitals account for 11% of Dutch hospital care volume. They employ approximately 29,000 people, and generate €2.9 billion in annual revenues.

In 2018 it is said to have reduced unnecessary inpatient stays over 15 months by 30% and the rate of reoperation due to complications in breast cancer patients by 74% using structured, value-based health care working with the Boston Consulting Group.
