= Máxima Medisch Centrum =

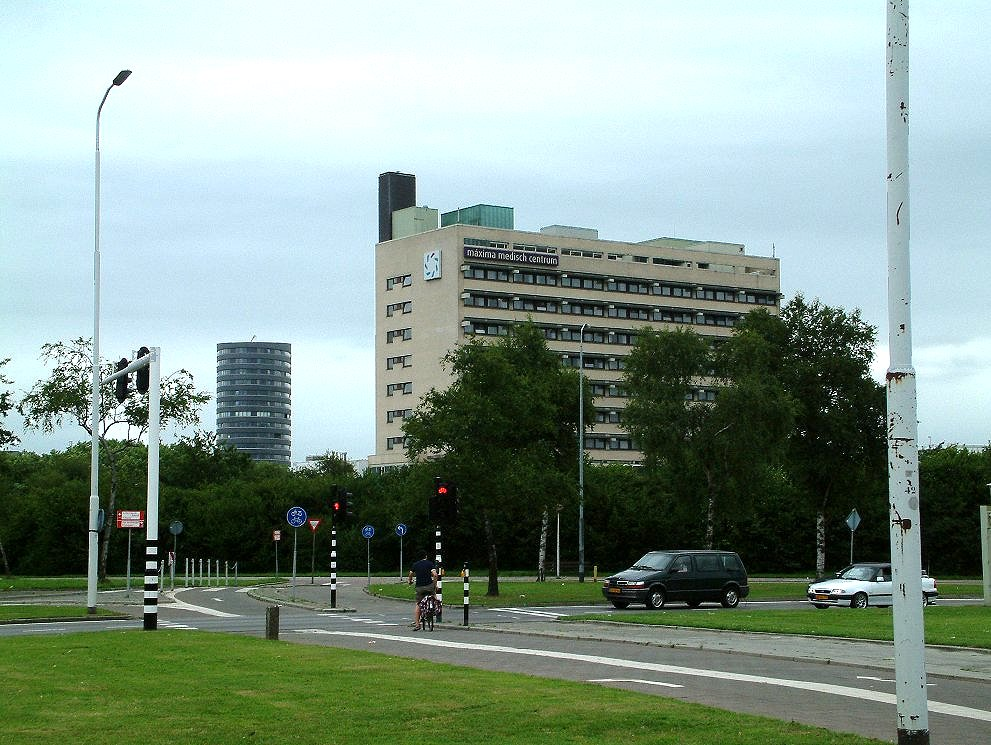
- Location Eindhoven

Geography
- Location: Veldhoven/Eindhoven, North Brabant, Netherlands

Organisation
- Type: Teaching
- Affiliated university: Maastricht University; Radboud University Nijmegen

Services
- Emergency department: Yes, on location Veldhoven
- Beds: 543 (2012)
- Speciality: Obstetrics and gynaecology

History
- Founded: 2002 (fusion); Sint-Josephziekenhuis (1932); Diaconessenhuis (1933)

Links
- Website: www.mmc.nl
- Lists: Hospitals in Netherlands

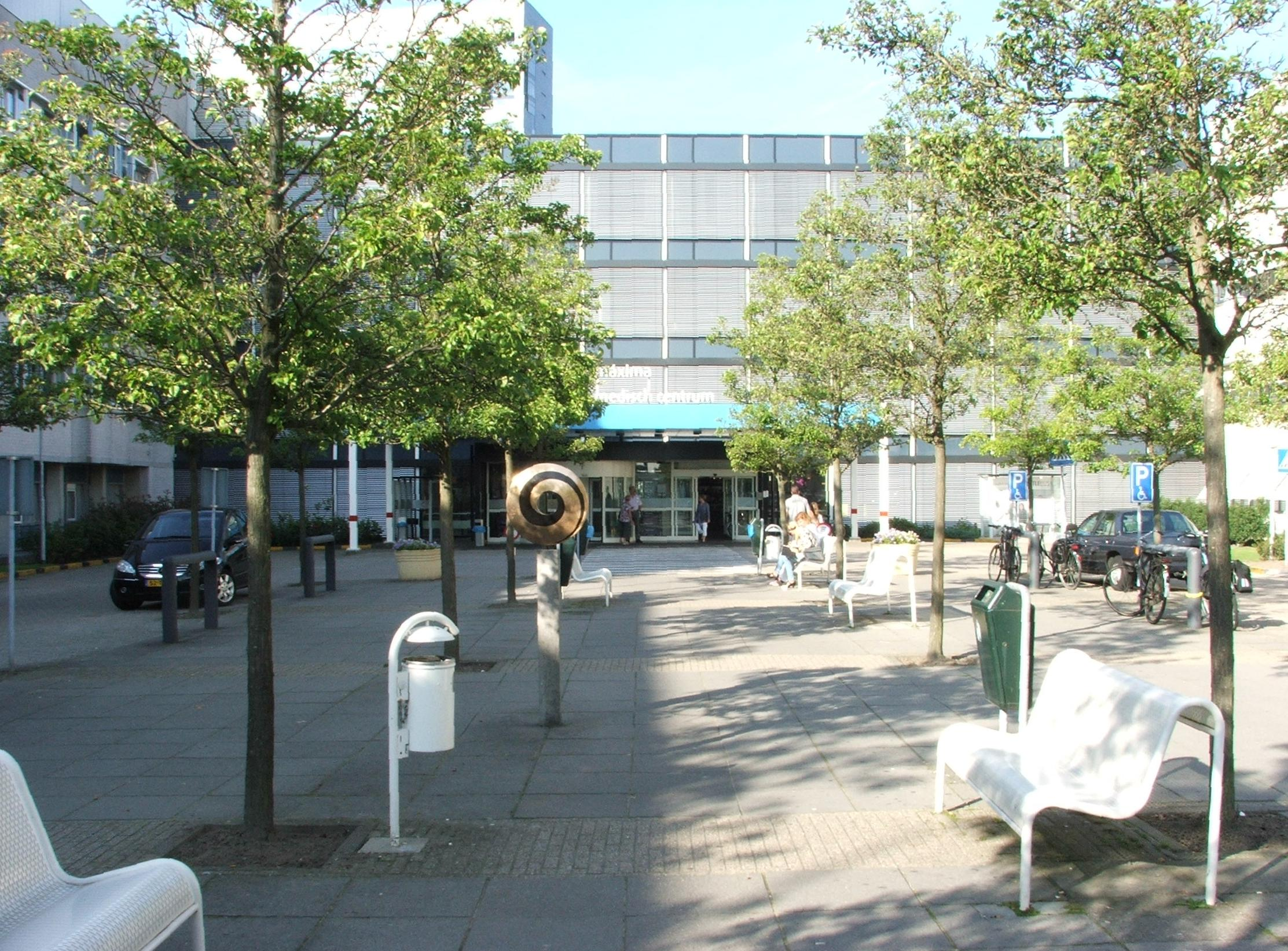
Location Veldhoven

Máxima Medisch Centrum (English: Maxima Medical Centre) is a teaching hospital in the Netherlands, on two locations, in Veldhoven and Eindhoven. It was founded in 2002 through the merger of the Sint-Josephziekenhuis in Veldhoven and the Diaconessenhuis in Eindhoven, and was named after Queen Máxima of the Netherlands. The main location is in Veldhoven, with the location in Eindhoven serving for non-critical care. It is the second biggest hospital in the Eindhoven region, after the Catharina Ziekenhuis in Eindhoven.

== History ==
=== Sint-Josephziekenhuis ===
Plans for the Sint-Josephziekenhuis had existed since 1915. Building started in 1930 at the Aalsterweg in Eindhoven, and it opened on 9 June 1932. It was designed by architect Eduard Cuypers and had 200 beds. During the second world war, the building was used for injured German troops. In 1991, the hospital relocated to Veldhoven, to its current location.

=== Diaconessenhuis ===
In the early 20th century, the city of Eindhoven, located in the Roman Catholic area of the Netherlands, had two mainly Roman Catholic hospitals, the Binnenziekenhuis and the Sint-Josephziekenhuis. During this period, Protestants from the rest of the country relocated to Eindhoven to work at Philips, causing a growth of the Protestant population. Since 1929 the "Vereeniging voor Protestantsch-Christelijke Ziekenverpleging" (English: Association for Protestant-Christian Patient Care) had put in effort to get a Protestant hospital. In 1933, an emergency hospital was opened in a villa at the Parklaan in Eindhoven, mainly by the efforts of Phillipes head nurse Johanna Kleinod, and with financial support of Dr. Anton Philips, who wanted the best medical care for all his employees, no matter what their religious orientation. With 20 beds it was soon found too small and in 1935 Villa Elsheim was bought with financial support of Philips. The new hospital, with 90 beds and a modern Rontgen department, was opened on 13 January 1940. In the 1950s the hospital was once again too small and in April 1967 it relocated to the Ds. Fliednerlaan in Woensel, Eindhoven.

In the mid 1980s the Diaconessenhuis was one of the first Dutch hospitals where laparoscopic surgery was done. It was the first Dutch hospital to perform a laparoscopic removal of a gallbladder.

=== Máxima Medisch Centrum ===
On 1 January 2002 the Sint-Josephziekenhuis and Diaconessenhuis fused and continued under the name Máxima Medisch Centrum. The new hospital was named after the wife of the then Dutch crown prince, Maxima of the Netherlands, who married that same year. On 1 September 2008 the services offered in the two locations was reorganised with the Veldhoven location becoming the main location for complex care, and the Eindhoven location for planned and minor care.

== Healthcare ==
In 2012 Máxima Medisch Centrum had 543 beds, making it the second largest hospital in the Eindhoven region, after the Catharina Ziekenhuis in Eindhoven. With 3250 employees, out of which 210 medical specialists, it provided care for 170.000 policlinical patients for a total of 450.000 policlinical consultations, 42.000 day care clinical patients, and 25.000 overnight clinical patients for a total of 105.000 overnight stays.

Máxima Medisch Centrum is a member of the "Vereniging Samenwerkende Topklinische Ziekenhuizen" (English: Association Cooperating Topclinical Hospitals), a cooperative association of the 20 largest Dutch teaching hospitals, who work together in areas of education and quality control, to guarantee the best level of healthcare. These hospitals have divided tertiary and specialist care amongst themselves, with set standards, in areas they call "topclinical care".

Areas in which Máxima Medisch Centrum offers such "top clinical care" are:

- Neonatal intensive care (NICU)
- Obstetric high care (OHC)
- Dialysis
- Hemophilia
- Outpatient advice for hereditary diseases

=== Location Veldhoven ===
Location Veldhoven is the main location of Máxima Medisch Centrum. It is used for policlinical consultations, complex surgeries, Woman Mother Child-centre, emergency care and intensive care.

In 2012 Maxima of the Netherlands opened the Woman Mother Child-centre on location Veldhoven, an obstetric and neonatal high care centre where mother and child can be together during the first 24 hours after birth, even when high care is needed.

=== Location Eindhoven ===
Location Eindhoven is used for outpatient consultations, plannable care and day care patients.
