= Joshua Borkovsky =

Israeli painter (born 1952)

Joshua Borkovsky יהושע בורקובסקי
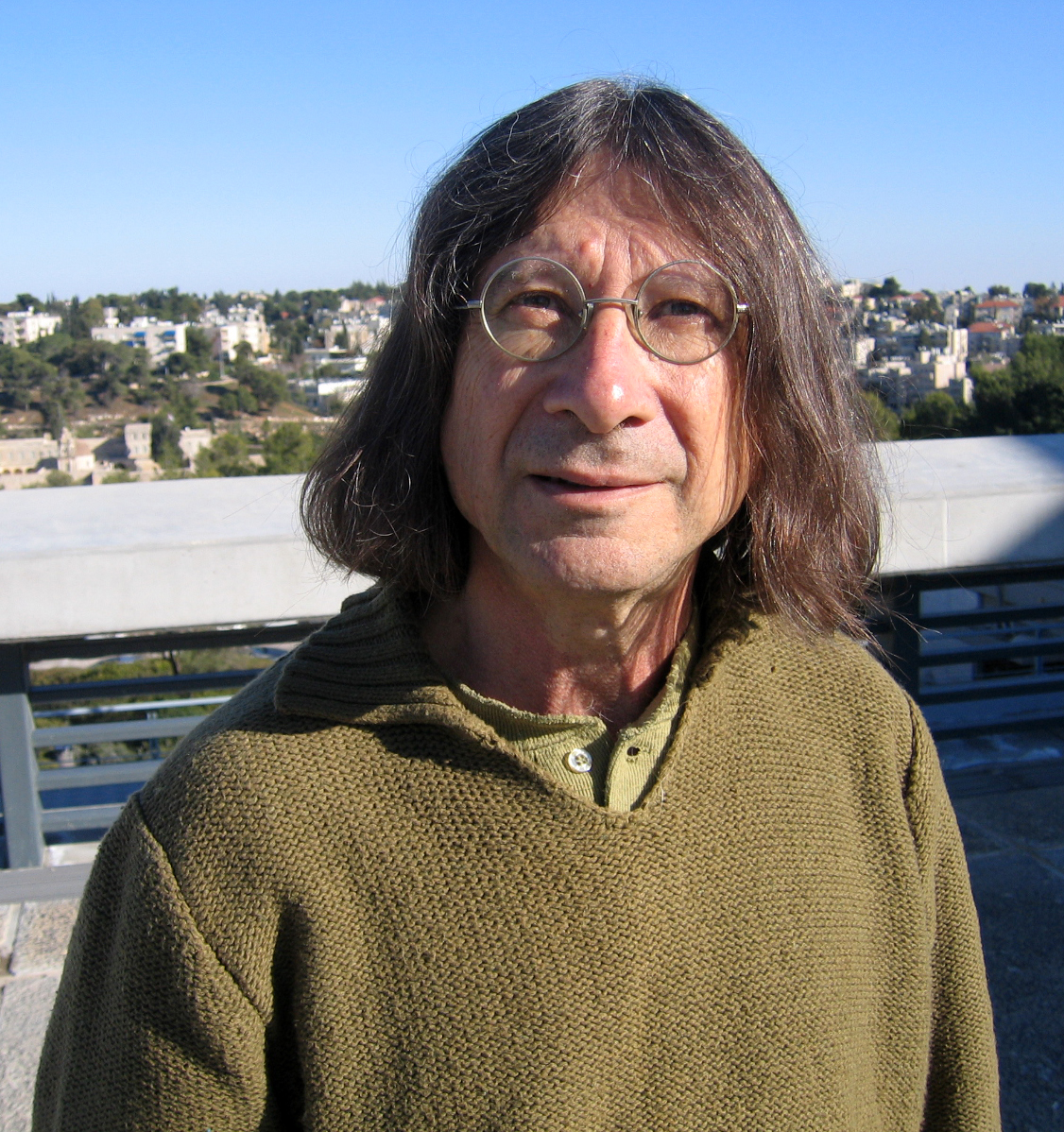
- Borkovsky in 2011
- Born: 1952 (age 73–74); Rishon LeZion
- Education: Bezalel Academy of Arts and Design, Jerusalem
- Known for: Painting
- Movement: Israeli art

Joshua (Shuky) Borkovsky (Hebrew: יהושע (שוקי) בורקובסקי; b. 19 January 1952 in Rishon LeZion) is an Israeli artist who lives and works in Jerusalem.

== Biography ==
Joshua (Shuky) Borkovsky was born in 1952. From 1973 to 1977, he studied at the Bezalel Academy of Arts and Design in Jerusalem. He began teaching at the Art Teachers College in Ramat Hasharon in 1978. In 1979, he joined the faculty of Bezalel. He has also taught workshops at the Hebrew University of Jerusalem. In 1980-81, he attended Hunter College in New York for his MFA degree.

Borkovsky's work features phantasmagoric imagery such as the silhouettes of sailing ships, and cartographic and geometric images.

Borkovsky's exhibition at the Israel Museum in 2013, titled "Veronese Green," featured 58 works from 10 cycles of paintings created from 1987 to 2012. Borkovsky creates open-ended cycles with one painting differing slightly from the next. The cyclical nature of these works creates a sense of time standing still. Many of the paintings evoke the image of photographs being developed in a darkroom.

== Solo exhibitions ==
- 1979 Yarkon Park Art Pavilion, Tel Aviv (Cat.)
- 1980 Hunter Gallery, New York
- 1985 Aika Brown Gallery, Jerusalem
- 1986 Bezalel Academy Art Gallery, Jerusalem
- 1987 Israel Museum, Jerusalem (Cat.)
- 1988 Artifact Gallery, Tel Aviv
- 1990 Gimel Gallery, Jerusalem
- 1994 "The Death of Virgil", Artifact Gallery, Tel Aviv
- 1998 "Pin Cone", Noga Gallery, Tel Aviv
- 2001 "Voyage", Noga Gallery, Tel Aviv
- 2003 "Echo& Narcissus", paintings, Noga Gallery, Tel Aviv
- 2003 "Anamorphoses", photographs, Noga Gallery, Tel Aviv
- 2005 "In Between", Ein-Harod Museum of Art (Cat.)
- 2006 "Echo & Narcissus", paintings, Noga Gallery, Tel Aviv
- 2008 "Vera Icon" Noga Gallery, Tel Aviv
- 2009 "Vera Icon" Oranim college, Oranim

== Gallery ==
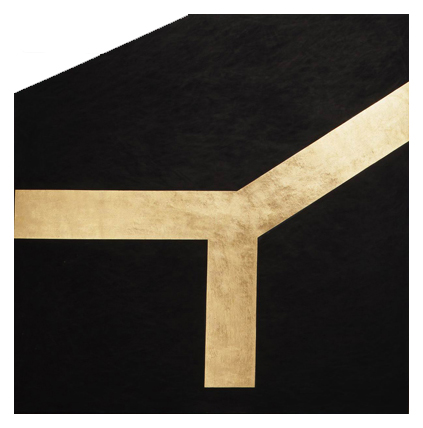
Pilgrimage, 1982
Israel Museum Collection
B86.0877

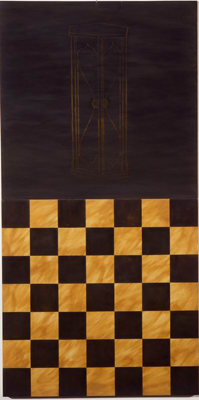
Untitled, 1989-1990
Israel Museum Collection
B94.0753

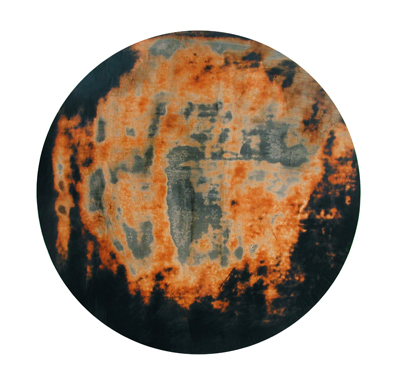
From Dream Stones series, 1990
Oil on Wood

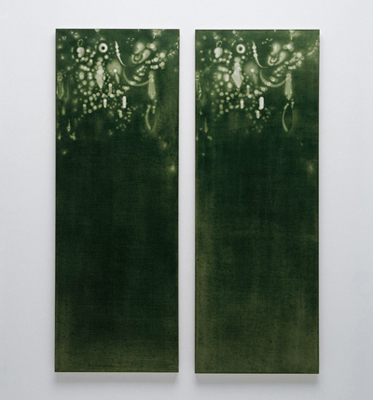
Untitled, from Pine Cone series, 1998
Oil on Canvas

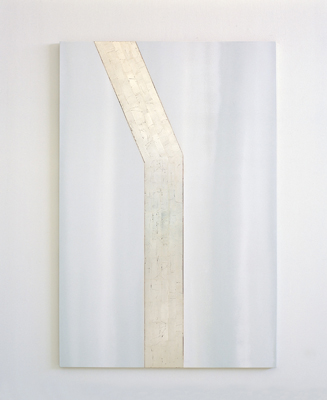
Untitled, from the Voyage series, 2001-2
Tempera and Gold Leaf on Wood Panel

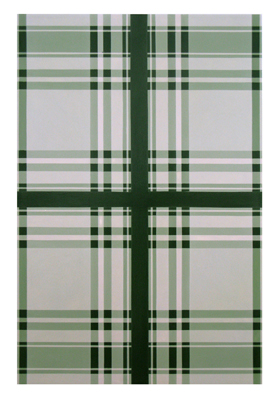
From the Vera Icon series, 2008
Tempera on Gesso on Wood

== Awards and recognition ==
- 2003 Finalist, 'Light and Matter' Competition, The Adi Prize for Jewish Expression in Art and Design
- 2013 Dizengoff Prize for painting

== See also ==
- Visual arts in Israel
