= CCA Tel Aviv-Yafo =

Art center in Tel Aviv-Yafo, Israel

- Former name: Center for Contemporary Art Tel Aviv
- Established: 1998
- Location: 2a Tsadok Hacohen St., Tel Aviv-Yafo
- Coordinates: 32.06713°N 34.76794°E
- Type: Contemporary art center (non-collecting) / Kunsthalle
- Founder: Sergio Edelsztein
- Director: Hila Cohen-Schneiderman
- Curator: Tamar Margalit
- Public transit access: Bus lines 18, 61, 82, 161, 238
- Parking: Carmel parking lot (Kalischer St & HaCarmel St)
- Website: www.cca.org.il

CCA Tel Aviv-Yafo (formerly the Center for Contemporary Art Tel Aviv) is a non-collecting contemporary-art institution in Tel Aviv-Yafo, Israel. It commissions and produces new projects by living artists, with a particular focus on artists from Israel, and presents a year-round program of exhibitions, performances, screenings and public events. Since 2005, it is housed at the Rachel & Israel Pollak Gallery on Tsadok Hacohen Street.

== History ==
The center was founded in 1998 by curator Sergio Edelsztein, who served as director and chief curator until 2017. In November 2005, the Tel Aviv-Yafo Municipality granted the center its current home, the Rachel & Israel Pollak Gallery, comprising two exhibition floors and a multipurpose space.

In September 2017 the board announced that curator and educator Nicola Trezzi had been appointed director and chief curator, beginning in 2018. In June 2025, the center announced that Hila Cohen-Schneiderman would succeed Trezzi as its new director and chief curator.

== Facilities ==
CCA Tel Aviv-Yafo operates at the Rachel & Israel Pollak Gallery (ground-floor gallery, first-floor gallery, and a multipurpose space), totaling roughly 300 square meters of exhibition space. The venue is located at 2a Tsadok Hacohen Street in central Tel Aviv-Yafo, close to the Carmel Market. It is open to the public six days a week.

== Directors ==
- Sergio Edelsztein, founding director and chief curator (1998–2017)
- Nicola Trezzi, director and chief curator (2017–2025)
- Hila Cohen-Schneiderman, director and chief curator (appointed 2025)
