= Nurit Buchweitz =

Israeli academic

- נורית בוכויץ
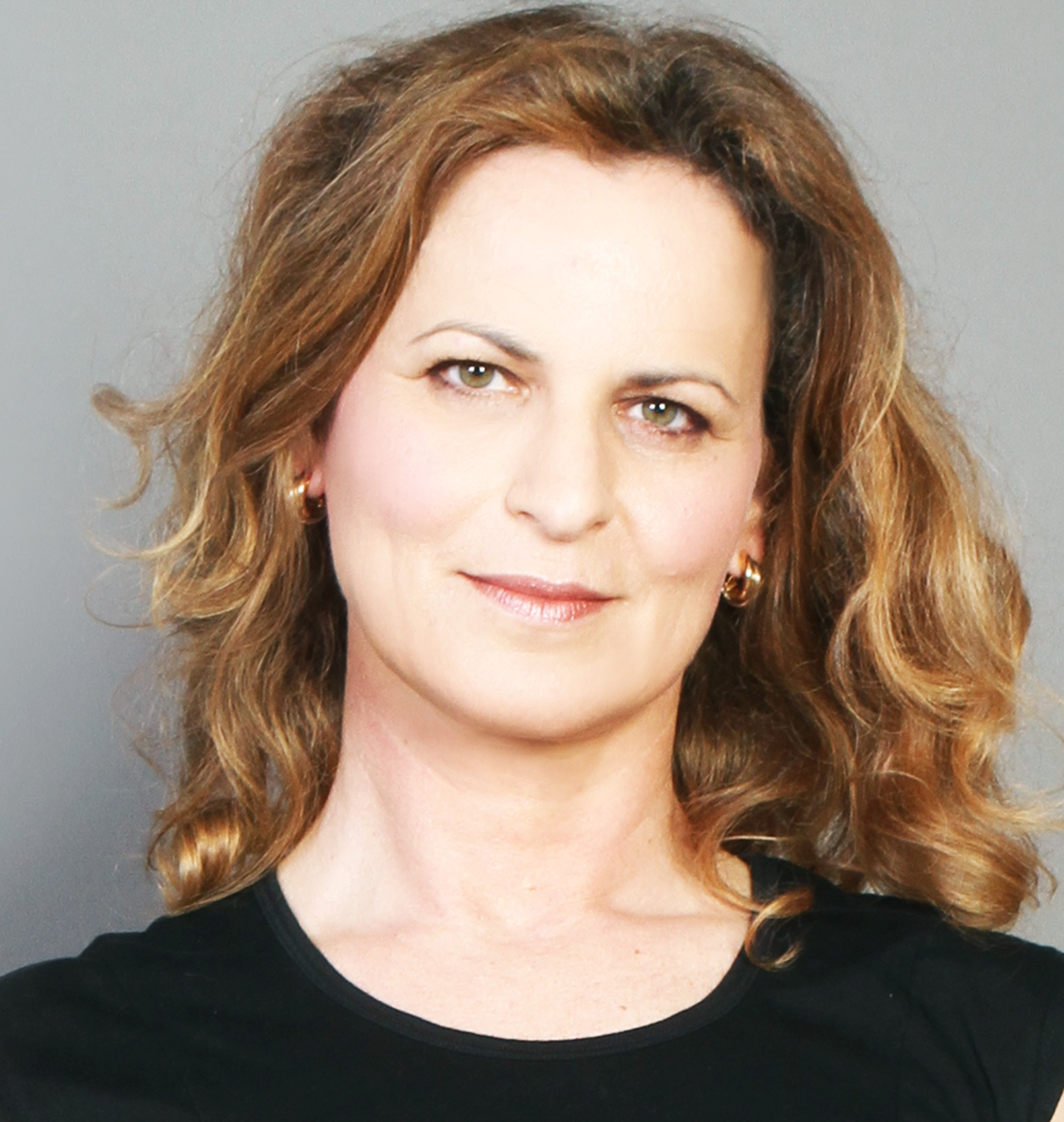
- Occupation: Academic
- Title: Dean of the Faculty of Society and Culture

Academic background
- Education: Tel Aviv University

Academic work
- Discipline: Comparative Literature
- Sub-discipline: Modern Hebrew Literature, Postmodernist literature

Nurit Buchweitz (Hebrew: נורית בוכויץ) is the Dean of the Faculty of Society and Culture at Beit Berl College in Israel, where she has lectured since 1994 in the Department of Hebrew and Comparative Literature, and the English department.

== Education ==
Buchweitz earned her BA and MA from Tel Aviv University in Poetics and General Literature. Buchweitz completed her Ph.D. in 2001 in Comparative Literature at School of Jewish Studies at Tel Aviv University. She was awarded the Dov Sadan Foundation Prize for Modern Hebrew Literature Excellence in Dissertation Research at Tel Aviv University. Additionally, she holds a teaching certificate from the School of Education at Tel Aviv University.

== Career ==
Buchweitz's main field of research is late-modernist and Postmodernist literature in English, French and Hebrew. She focuses on twenty-first century writing and Posthumanism, postmodern poetics and theory, and has published extensively on Michel Houellebecq’s prose, Meir Wieseltier’s poetry and prose, Etgar Keret’s oeuvre, as well as children and youth literature and postmodernist Israeli poetry.

Buchweitz has lectured internationally and was a visiting professor in Ludwigsburg University of Education in Germany and Pedagogical University of Cracow in Poland. She has participated in and organized numerous conferences domestically and internationally.

At Beit Berl College, Professor Buchweitz was chair of the Department of Hebrew and Comparative literature between 2008–2013 and since 2015, the Dean of the Faculty of Society and Culture. She also served as Chair of the Honors Program, Chair of the Humanities Cluster and Chair of the Academic Council in the Faculty of Society and Culture. Also at Beit Berl College, Buchweitz initiated a three-year program addressing contact between Hebrew literature and Arabic literature, including Mizrahi literature in Israel and minor literature (Arab authors who write in Hebrew), in collaboration with the Arab Academic Institute of Education. Buchweitz was co-editor of Mifgeshey Tarbut (Cultural Encounters), a Hebrew academic journal dedicated to multi- and inter-cultural research.

== Publications ==
Buchweitz is the author or editor of five books and more than 40 journal articles and book chapters. She is a member of the professional associations MLA and NAPH and is an active reviewer in international refereed journals.

=== Books ===
- Permit to Pass: Generation Shift, Meir Wiezeltier and the Poetry of the 1960s (In Hebrew). Hakibbutz Hameuchad 2008
- In Others[s] Words: Studies in Hebrew and Arabic Literature (In Hebrew), Resling Publishing 2010 (with Abed Alrachman Marii and Alon Fragman)
- Sensational Visual Pleasures: The Phallic Eye. Palgrave Macmillan 2014 (with Gilad Padva)
- An Officer of Civilization: The Poetics of Michel Houellebecq. Peter Lang (publisher) 2015
- Intimate Relationships in Literature, Cinema and the Arts. Palgrave Macmillan 2017 (with Gilad Padva)
