= Miki Kratsman =

Miki Kratsman מיקי קרצמן
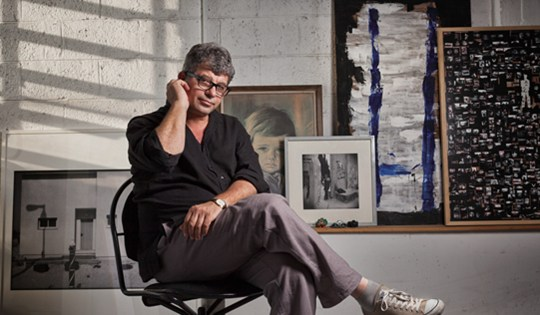
- Born: 1959 (age 66–67); Argentina
- Known for: photography, photojournalism
- Movement: Photography, Israeli art, Photojournalism
- Awards: The EMET Prize for Art, Science and Culture, The Mendel and Eva Pundik Prize for Israeli Art, Robert Gardner Fellowship in Photography, Minister of Education and Culture Prize, British Multi Exposure Grant

Miki Kratsman (Hebrew: מיקי קרצמן) is an Argentine-born Israeli photographer, photojournalist and activist.

== Biography ==
Miki Kratsman was born in Argentina in 1959. He immigrated to Israel with his family in 1971. He studied photography at Kiryat Ono College. His spouse is Israeli fashion designer Dorin Frankfurt.

== Photography career ==
He worked as photojournalist in Hadashot newspaper until 1993, when the newspaper was closed. Kratsman joined Haaretz newspaper, where he worked until 2012.

Kratsman taught at Camera Obscura College of Photography in Tel Aviv from 1997 to 1999; School for Geographic Photography of Tel Aviv from 1998 to 2006; Department of Art in Haifa University from 2002 to 2006. In 2006, Kratsman was appointed Head of the photography department in Bezalel Academy of Arts and Design and chaired the department until his retirement in 2014.

In addition to exhibiting his own works, Kratsman curates exhibitions for galleries and museums in Israel.

== Works ==
The main theme of Kratsman's work is the Israeli–Palestinian conflict. Other dominant topics are architecture, space and borders. Kratsman collaborated with many artists, among others David Reeb and Boaz Arad. For years, Kratsman documented the Palestinian territories. He follows personal stories and brings into harsh focus the violence that became daily life in the Palestinian territories.

== Exhibitions ==
=== Solo exhibitions ===
- 1994 Bugrashov Gallery, Tel Aviv
- 1996 Gallery of Bezalel Academy of Art and Design, Jerusalem
- 2001 Nelly Aman Gallery, Tel Aviv
- 2002 Nelly Aman Gallery, Tel Aviv
- 2003 The Israel Museum, Jerusalem
- 2007 Secured Area, Chelouche Gallery, Tel Aviv
- 2009 Works, Chelouche Gallery, Tel Aviv
- 2010 Deleitosa, Solo project at ARCOMadrid, Madrid
- 2010 Targeted Killing, Media City Seoul 201, Korea
- 2011 All About Us, Ursula Blickle Foundation, Germany
- 2012 AS IT IS. On Miki Kratsman's Photography, MUSAC Museum for Contemporary Art, Leon, Spain
- 2012 AS IT IS. On Miki Kratsman's Photography, La Virreina Centre de la Imatge, Barcelona, Spain
- 2013 People I met. Chelouche Gallery for Contemporary Art, Tel Aviv, Israel
- 2014 Solo project, Photobooth, ArteBA Art Fair, Buenos Aires
- 2021 Anti-Mapping, Tel Aviv Museum of Art (with Shabtai Pinchevsky)

=== Group exhibitions ===
- Jewish Museum, Berlin

== Awards and recognition ==
- 2011. Gardner Photography Fellow. Peabody Museum of Archaeology and Ethnology, Harward University.
- 2011. The EMET Prize for Art, Science and Culture in Photography.

== See also ==
- Israeli art
