= Ilana Paul-Binyamin =

Israeli academic and current Dean of the Faculty of Education

Dr. Ilana Paul-Binyamin (Hebrew: ד"ר אילנה פאול-בנימין) is an Israeli academic and current dean of the Faculty of Education at Beit Berl College in Israel. Paul-Binyamin is an expert on Multiculturalism in education.

== Education ==
Paul-Binyamin graduated from Beit Berl College with a Bachelors of Education in 1989. She received her master's degree from Bar-Ilan University Department of Informal Education in 1997, and received her PhD in 2006 from the University of Haifa’s Department of Sociology and Anthropology.

Paul-Binyamin's research focuses on Education in Israel. Her areas of expertise includes shared society in Israel, multicultural education, education policy, and qualitative research methods.

She has published numerous papers on these topics, ranging from religious students in public-sector colleges, to bilingual schools in divided societies.

== Beit Berl College ==
In 2019, Paul-Binyamin was appointed the dean of the Faculty of Education at Beit Berl College, where she was a senior lecturer since 2017. She has also served as a lecturer at Tel Aviv University.

Paul-Binyamin co-directed the Center for Education for Shared Society at Beit Berl College along with Mary Copti until she became Dean of the college in 2019. The goal of the center is to change the way Israeli teachers see the society and teach their students. Students learn about the socio-economic makeup of Jews and Arabs in Israel and the dynamics of minority-majority relations, and how to talk about and teach these topics.

Following the outbreak of the Israel–Hamas war on October 7, 2023, Paul-Binyamin wrote about the challenges it posed to Jewish–Arab relations at Beit Berl College. She described identifying with the suffering of Israelis while distinguishing Hamas from Palestinian civilians in Gaza, whose suffering she said she also recognized. Paul-Binyamin wrote that the war intensified existing tensions between Jewish and Arab students and faculty and prompted her to reassess her research and the college's pedagogical approaches to education for a shared society.
