= Orit Ishay =

Israeli artist and lecturer in photography (born 1961)

Orit Ishay אורית ישי
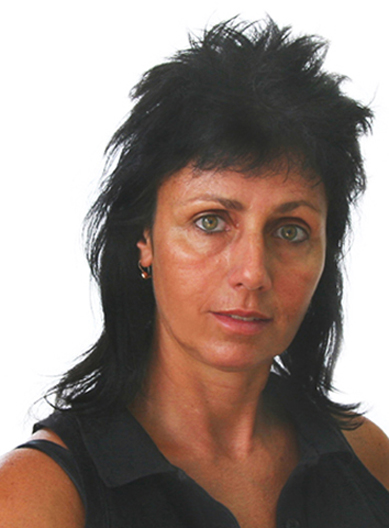
- Self portrait
- Born: 1961 (age 64–65); Tel Aviv, Israel
- Education: Ha'Midrasha School of Art, Beit Berl College; Musrara School of Photography, Media and New Music; The David Yellin Academic College
- Known for: Photography, video art

Orit Ishay (Hebrew: אורית ישי; born 1961) is an Israeli artist working in photography, video and installation. She is also a lecturer in photography. Ishay's art examines the interrelation between man and place and possible systems of representation, while addressing questions pertaining to social and mental issues through temporal and spatial motifs. Her work is usually accompanied by theoretical research.

In 2012, she led a tour that was open to the general public in the "Haifa Walks #2" project, held in the framework of the show Haifa-Jerusalem-Tel Aviv at the Haifa Museum of Art.

== Awards ==
- 2014: MuseumsQuartier Wien, quartier21 Artist-in-Residence Studio Program, Vienna

== Solo exhibitions ==
- 2014: Terribly Pretty, Awfully Beautiful. The Kibbutz Gallery Tel Aviv, IL

== Selected group exhibitions ==
- 2014: Rising Star, Herzliya Museum of Contemporary Art, IL
- 2012: Daily Reports, MNAC, National Museum for Contemporary Art, Bucharest, Romania
- 2010: Identity III: Positioning, WUK – FotogalerieWien, Vienna
