= Karam Natour =

Israeli visual artist

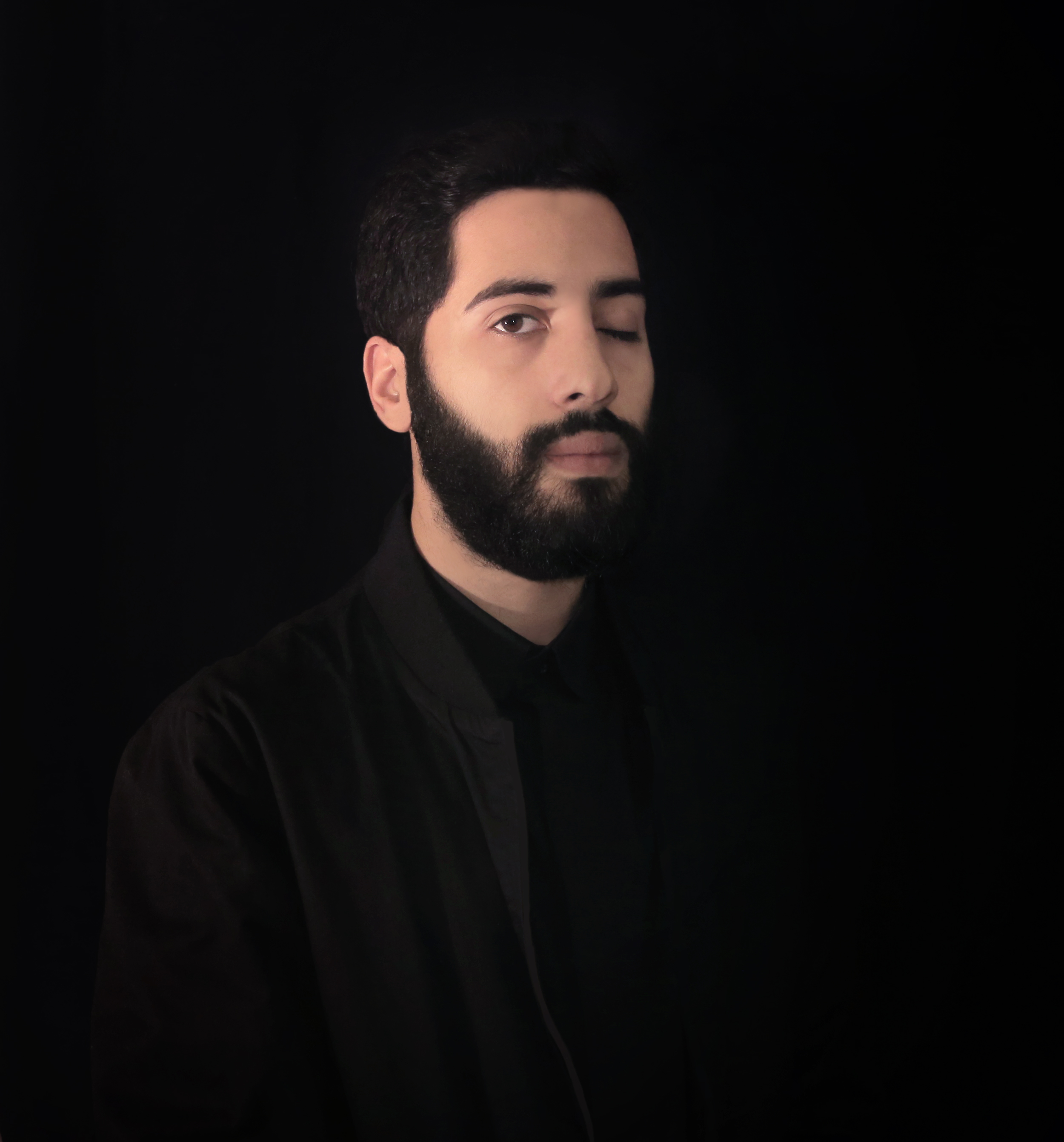
- Karam Natour
- Born: Nazareth, Israel
- Known for: Video Art
- Website: www.karamnatour.com

Karam Natour (born 1992 in Nazareth, Israel) is a visual artist. Natour’s practice employs a variety of mediums, including video, digital drawing, and installation, although he considers video his ‘mother tongue’

== Biography ==
Natour was born in Nazareth, Israel in 1992, and was raised in Shefa-'Amr, Israel. He studied in Bezalel Academy of Art and Design, receiving BFA in 2015 and MFA in 2017. Natour started to teach in Bezalel Academy of Art and Design from 2018.

His works have been exhibited in various museums and venues including Tel Aviv Museum of Art (Israel), Israel Museum (Israel), Kunstmuseum Bochum (Germany), Triumph Gallery (Moscow), Haifa Museum of Art (Israel), and solo shows at Sommer Contemporary Art (Zurich), CCA Tel Aviv-Yafo (Israel), Umm al-Fahm Art Gallery (Israel), Rosenfeld Gallery (Israel), and Hulu Split Gallery (Croatia).

Natour has received various awards including the 2020 Wolf Foundation’s Kiefer Prize for Young Artists and the 2019 Young Artist Award from the Ministry of Science, Culture and Sport. In 2020 Natour was chosen for Forbes 30 Under 30 list.

In 2022 he moved to live and work in Milan, Italy.

== Work ==
The main protagonist in Natour’s video works and drawings is his own figure, which he takes on historic, cultural, and social journeys. Natour’s drawings are digital illustrations that usually start from a still photo or video on which he traces the image with a digital pen. In his drawing practice, Natour is led by different “others” —or as the artist calls them “entities”— which function as spiritual muses. Natour sees these “entities” as co-creators. The body’s corporal presence is a recurring motif in Natour’s works, which highlights the allegorical associations involving the existence of the body. In his different drawings, Natour often touches on the figure of the artist with a tongue in cheek approach, humor, and cynicism. In his works, there is an internal conflict with and in relation to art, jokes that build on traditional artistic iconography, and a dialogue with other artworks which lies between ironic ridicule to homage that mediates the language, politics, and even art in a new manner. Natour exposes the distortion and powerlessness found in structured systems of information imposed by the hegemonic mechanisms.

=== Nothing Personal ===
Natour's Nothing Personal (2017) is a 20-minutes video art piece. It is considered one of Natour's most controversial artworks. In the video, Natour plays the role of an immobilised artist and is seen lying on a bed in his studio. He calls the emergency services and ask the paramedics to come and rescue him. “I cannot move, and I am so scared,” speaking to the operator in English, not Hebrew nor Arabic. Both the operator and himself speak broken English to each other, neither being completely comfortable, thus levelling the field and neutralising the power of the majoritarian which is also manifested through mastery of language. Recorded in real time, the video shows the paramedics arriving about a few minutes later, bringing two teams, not only one, and demonstrating extreme care for the mysterious case of the immobilised artist. “There is something in me that I can’t get out myself,” whines Natour. The video shows two channels that present two simultaneous views: one turning into the artist’s studio, and the other looking out from the studio to the corridor and entrance hall leading into it.

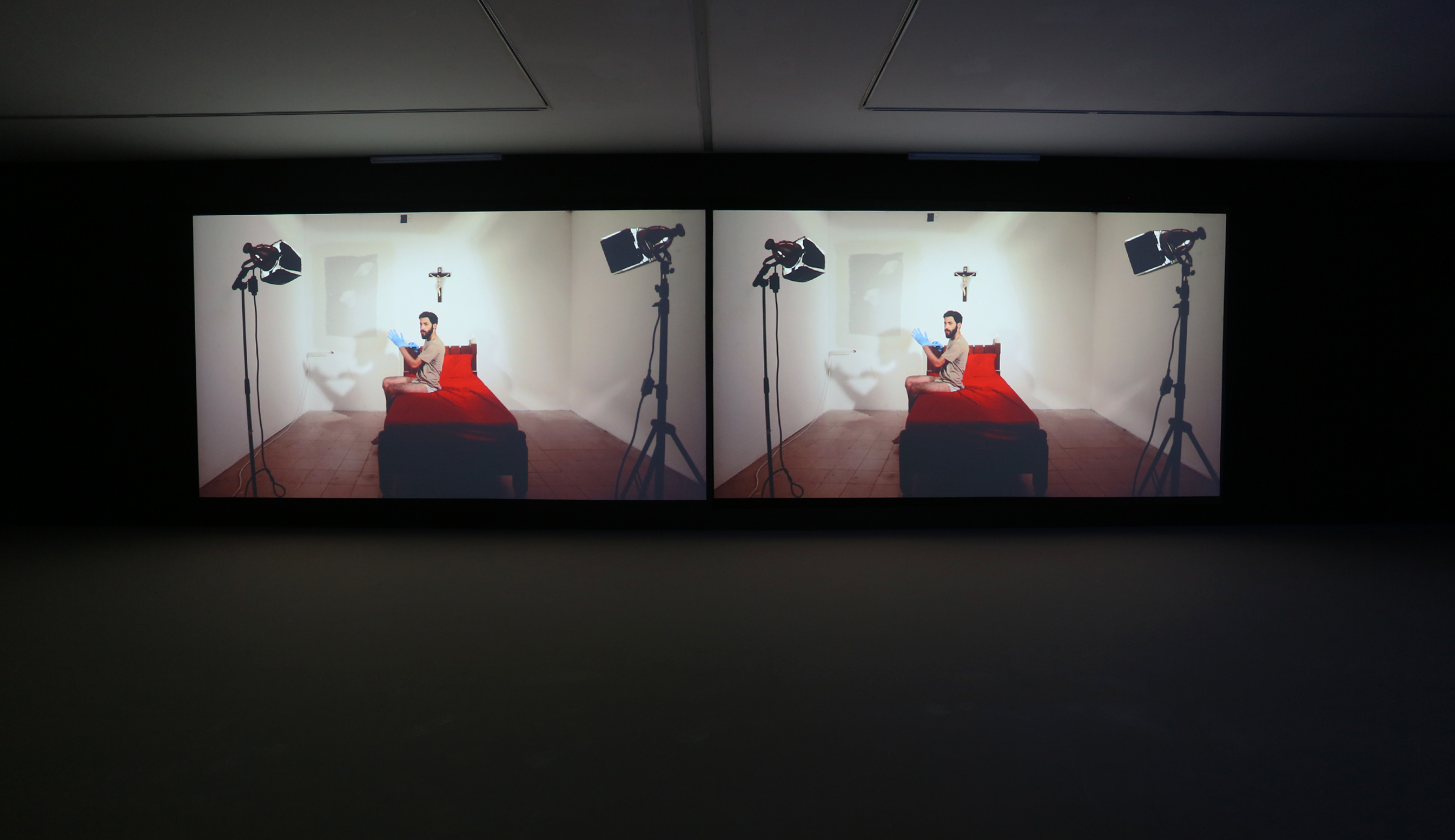
Installation view of Natour's Nothing Personal at Tel Aviv Museum of Art, 2017

Swerving between reality and fiction, metaphor and plain speech, Natour explores the condition of the artist who, in fact, needs the help of outside forces to complete his project. After a few minutes, one of the paramedics notices the camera filming the crew and mentions it in Hebrew, but the others don’t seem troubled by this fact. Soon after this, Natour starts to feel better, he is able to move and breathe normally. “It is typical of stress,” claims one of the paramedics. Before leaving, someone takes Natour’s ID number and health insurance information, then wishes him a quick recovery. Natour made the video a week before a solo exhibition when he was under extreme stress, not knowing exactly what to produce.

There are many layers of meaning to unravel in this work, starting with the limited freedom of movement of the artist who depends on various benevolent outside forces, from audience to participants, and from exhibiting institutions to funders. But of course there is also the topic of the tension between minority and majority tempered by the usage of English by both parties, and maybe even of ethics: what is OK to do in the name of art? Natour opened himself up to risk, assuming the potential consequences of his action, maybe even putting a sick person’s life in jeopardy if another ambulance could not reach them, but also of course of being discovered by the paramedics for staging the situation. For Natour, language is inherent in power relations, it is a tool of control but also a means of connection and often, misunderstanding. Therefore its function is always thematised in his work.

The video has caused controversy when it was presented at the Tel Aviv Museum of Art in 2017. In a newspaper review on the work wrote the art critic Dr. Shaul Setter:

"Natour is playing a dangerous game. The political coordinates of the work are clear: The Palestinian artist refuses to speak Hebrew, pretends not to understand the language, although it's clear he knows it perfectly. He is presented as weak, helpless, needy, on the brink of oblivion. He calls the country's medical authorities, asking the Jewish paramedics for help. This is ostensibly an ’immoral’ act: a spoiled and superfluous amusement, the theft of valuable social welfare resources. But that's exactly the point. To help him, actually to rescue him. They are all big and strong, as opposed to his gaunt condition. It's as though his life force is being sucked out of him: He's in pain, suffering, perhaps bearing the sins of others. A cross hangs above his bed. But all this is deception, a dangerous game or a total lie: Natour summons the MDA team in vain, wastes their time "for nothing". He plays tricks on the country's forces, sabotages their activities. These are not policing, controlling forces like the army, Border Police, Shin Bet security service (“We're not the police,” the paramedics tell him). Rather, they offer medical services, assistance and rescue. He isn't only a Christian martyr, he's a terrorist of representations, avenging his inferior civilian status and exploiting state institutions, exhausting their strength for no reason. This is ostensibly an “im- moral” act: a spoiled and superfluous amusement, the theft of valuable social welfare resources. He sets up a camera, gets into position, organizes a situation, invites actors. Although he exercises his “identity problems” in the work — as a Christian Palestinian in a Jewish Israeli society, a delicate man in a macho society — he does not refer to them directly, represent them or openly deal with them. His work comes out of his physical and intellectual paralysis — beginning when there is “nothing to say,” or when one doesn't succeed in saying anything, out of a refusal to speak a familiar social language, and from there embarks on a search. It demands using art as a site that creates its meaning in opposition to the world, with meanings that have long been known, a place where there is controversy and danger, that doesn't respond to good taste"

Natour is an artist who undertakes sometimes poetic, sometimes blatant analyses of identity, citizenship, intimacy, and power relations by playing with language, and performing actions that rely on repetition, humor, and mutual trust. He doesn’t make any absolute political statements, yet by using himself and his family in his videos, he becomes the incarnation of the political body through which we can grasp the existential conflicts that he, and other minorities, carry.

== Exhibitions ==
=== Solo ===
- 2021 “Karam Natour: Vidéos”, Montpellier Danse, Montpellier, France
- 2021 “Night Vision”, CCA Tel Aviv-Yafo, Tel Aviv, Israel
- 2021 “Blessing in Disguise”, Sommer Contemporary Art, Zurich, Switzerland
- 2021 “Family Pictures”, duo show with Guy Ben-Ner, Oranim College Gallery, Tivon, Israel
- 2020 “Blurred Lines”, HULU SPLIT, Split, Croatia
- 2018 “Body Following Spirit”, Rosenfeld Gallery, Tel Aviv, Israel
- 2018 “Repeat After Me”, Umm al-Fahm Art Gallery, Umm El Fahem, Israel
- 2016 “Following No Mythologies”, Rosenfeld Gallery, Tel Aviv, Israel

=== Selected group ===
- 2021 “Global Positioning”, Public Art Fund, New York, USA
- 2021 “Someone Else”, Museum für Neue Kunst Freiburg, Freiburg, Germany
- 2021 “Speech Act”, Fosdick-Nelson Gallery, Alfred University, New York, USA
- 2021 “That Those Beings Be Not Being”, W139 Gallery, Amsterdam, Netherlands
- 2021 “Glocal Emotions”, Motorenhalle Gallery, Dresden, Germany
- 2021 “The Way We Survive”, Petah Tikva Museum of Art, Petah Tikva, Israel
- 2021 “Love in the Time of Social Media”, Rote Fabrik, Zurich, Switzerland
- 2020 “Bodyscapes”, The Israel Museum, Jerusalem, Israel
- 2019 “Family Stories”, Kunstmuseum Bochum, Bochum, Germany
- 2019 “Drop Dead Funny”, The Brno House of Arts, Brno, Czech Republic
- 2018 “Illuminations“, Triumph Gallery, Moscow, Russia
- 2018 “Looper“, Tel Aviv Museum of Art, Tel Aviv, Israel
- 2018 “Seven Rituals to Change the Mood“, Hamidrasha Gallery, Tel Aviv, Israel
- 2018 “70/70/70“, the Santa Barbara Center for Art, California, USA
- 2018 “I to Eye, The Israel Museum, Jerusalem, Israel
- 2018 “Shop it!“, Haifa Museum of Art, Haifa, Israel
- 2018 “Mixed Chromosome“, MOM ART SPACE, Hamburg, Germany
- 2018 “ShowReal, the Photography Gallery of Bezalel Academy, Jerusalem, Israel
- 2018 “Hide and Seek, The Israel Museum, Jerusalem, Israel
- 2017 “Aiming for Touch“, P8 Gallery, Tel Aviv, Israel
- 2017 “VOID, Veinti4/Siete Galería, San José, USA
- 2017 “Current Affairs“, Tel Aviv Museum of Art, Tel Aviv, Israel
- 2017 “Yerucham“, ZUMU Museum, Yerucham, Israel
- 2017 “Masterpiss“, Janco Dada Museum, Ein Hod, Israel
- 2017 “The Kids are All Right, Oranim College, Kiryat Tivon, Israel
- 2015 “Memorial to the Goyim, Hanina Gallery, Tel Aviv, Israel
- 2015 “Desert-Things”, Barbur Gallery. Jerusalem, Israel
- 2015 “Correspondences“, Gershman Hall Gallery, Philadelphia, USA

== Awards ==
- 2020 Art Kiefer Prize Laureate
- 2020 Young Video Artist Award, Ministry of Science Culture and Sport, Jerusalem
- 2018 Special Mention of the Jury Award, Bucharest International Experimental Film Festival
- 2017 Academic Excellence Award, MFA program, Bezalel Academy of Art and Design
- 2015 10X10 Prize for Academic Excellence, Bezalel Academy of Art and Design
- 2012 Revital Serri Z.L. Award, Excellence Prize, Bezalel Academy of Art and Design
