= Laurent Montaron =

French visual artist

Laurent Montaron (born 1972 in Verneuil-sur-Avre), is a French visual artist.

== Work ==
Laurent Montaron is an interdisciplinary artist working across film, photography, installation, sound and objects. His work is suffused with the contemporary history of the media and questions the tools that shape our representations ^{,}. In his work he attempts to reveal the sometimes irrational element of belief involved with emerging techniques. His perception is that while technology has provided the public with new means of perceiving and representing reality it has not necessarily brought people closer from the truth, for it has also given rise to new ways for questioning paradoxes attendant on our awareness of modernity.

== Selected Solo Exhibitions ==
- 2025 — To Tell a Story, Galerie Meilun, Changsha (China)
- 2024 — To Tell a Story, ENSP – Rencontres d’Arles, Arles (France)
- 2024 — Wishbone, 303 Hiroshima, Hiroshima (Japan)
- 2023 — Film, Cinema Department, Centre Pompidou, Paris (France)
- 2020 — Solo Show, Monitor Gallery, Lisbon (Portugal)
- 2019 — ECCE, Biasa ArtSpace, Ubud, Bali (Indonesia)
- 2018 — Télé-vision, Galerie Anne-Sarah Bénichou, Paris (France)
- 2018 — REPLICA, Center for Contemporary Art, Tel Aviv-Yafo (Israel)
- 2016 — Dioramas, Fondation d’Entreprise Ricard, Paris (France)
- 2014 — Everything is Accidental, Monitor, Rome (Italy)
- 2014 — Everything is Accidental, Mercer Union, Toronto (Canada)
- 2013 — Pigna Project Space, Rome (Italy)
- 2013 — Prospectif Cinéma, Centre Pompidou, Paris (France)

== Selected Group Exhibitions ==
- 2022 — Science, Fiction, Centre d’art et de rencontres Curiox, Ugine (France)
- 2021 — Monts Analogues, FRAC Champagne-Ardenne, Reims (France)
- 2015 — Eppur si muove, MUDAM – Musée d’Art Moderne Grand-Duc Jean, Luxembourg
- 2014 — 19th Biennale of Sydney: You Imagine What You Desire, Sydney (Australia)
- 2014 — Le origini del film, Palazzo Grassi, Venice (Italy)
- 2013 — 55th Venice Biennale: The Encyclopedic Palace, Venice (Italy)
- 2012 — Open End – Goetz Collection, Haus der Kunst, Munich (Germany)

== Publications and catalogues ==
- Laurent Montaron (Mousse Publishing, 2021) – quadrilingual monograph (French/English/Arabic/Hebrew), texts by Philippe-Alain Michaud and Mike Sperlinger, ISBN 978-88-6749-448-4. Online • Archive
- Laurent Montaron (IAC / Les Presses du réel, 2012) – bilingual monograph (French/English), ISBN 978-2-84066-447-5. Online • Archive
- La Galerie: Laurent Montaron (Isthme éditions, 2006) – bilingual monographic catalogue (French/English). Online • Archive
- Ateliers 1997–2002, Centre national de la Photographie, Paris.
- Célébration! 20 ans du FRAC Champagne-Ardenne, FRAC Champagne-Ardenne, Reims.
