= Beit Berl College =

Academic college in Israel

- Type: Multidisciplinary academic college
- Established: 1971
- President: Yuli Tamir
- Location: Beit Berl, Israel; 32°12′4″N 34°55′35″E
- Website: beitberl.ac.il/english Building details
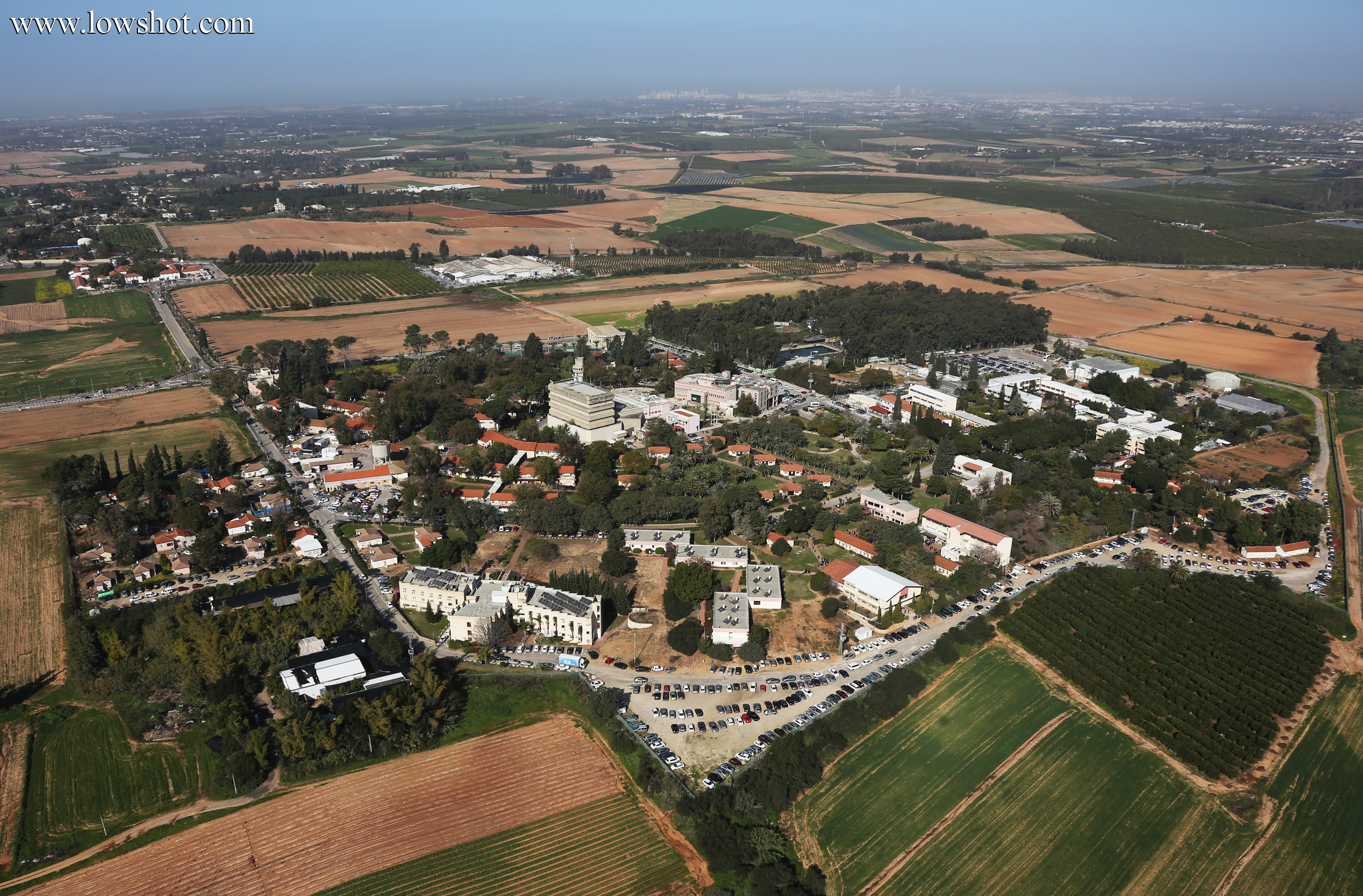
- View of the campus

Beit Berl College is a multi-disciplinary academic college for higher education located in Beit Berl in the Sharon region of Israel. It is one of the oldest colleges in Israel.

The college grants undergraduate degrees (B.Ed and B.Ed.F.A.) and graduate degrees (M.Ed and M.Teach) in a variety of disciplines in teaching and education (formal and informal), in the arts (fine arts, film, art education, art therapy), humanities and social sciences. The college also issues teaching certificates for academics and various types of diplomas.

== Overview ==
The college consists of about 600 lecturers active in all fields of teaching and research, and over 8,000 students studying in three faculties and the Keshet Center for Professional Development:

- Faculty of Education
- HaMidrasha – Faculty of the Arts
- Faculty of Society and Culture

From 2008 to 2020, Tamar Ariav was president of the College. Yuli Tamir, an Israeli academic and former politician, became president in October 2020.

== Faculty of Education ==
The Faculty of Education, headed by Dean Ilana Paul-Binyamin, combines many fields under one roof. It provides a framework for undergraduate studies in teaching, a master's degree in education counseling, education planning and evaluation, learning disabilities: assessment and educational intervention, management and organization of educational systems, support of at-risk and distressed youth, teaching and learning: languages and education and Arab heritage. Academics are offered various teacher training programs and a master's program in teaching secondary school. The facility offers educational studies and operates support programs and resources for the teacher training processes, as well as the processes of entering the profession.

The Arab Academic Institute for Education- The institute, which operates within the framework of the Faculty of Education, was established in 1971 and since 1981 has been operating within the Beit Berl College. The institute offers a variety of tracks and courses for an undergraduate degree in teaching (B.Ed.) in various teaching subjects taught in Israel's Arab schools in special education, early childhood, primary school, secondary school and informal education.

== Faculty of the Arts ==
HaMidrasha School of Art was established in 1946 and operated as a night school. The name was later changed to reflect its educational goals, i.e. training art teachers. Among the administrators were Arieh Elwell, Nahum Gutman, Moshe Avigal and Aharon Avni. In 1964, HaMidrasha was recognized by the Ministry of Education and Culture. In 1966, Ran Shechori was appointed to head the college, serving in this position until 1980.

Following the end of Shechori's term, in 1980, Shlomo Vitkin was appointed director of HaMidrasha and stayed in the role until 1997. During his tenure, in 1987, HaMidrasha merged with Beit Berl College. In 1989, the "Open Graduate School" art curriculum was established, which today is called the "Individual Curriculum in Art".

Later that year, Beit Berl College moved to an institutional building, and the official name of HaMidrasha became HaMidrasha – Faculty of the Arts. Doron Rabina was appointed Dean of the Faculty. In the same year, the Graduate School received a certificate to grant undergraduate degrees (B.Ed.) in a dual-discipline program that combines a BA degree in art theory with another degree. In 2013, artist Miri Segal replaced Roee Rosen as head of the Graduate Studies program at HaMidrasha, and curator Avi Lubin was appointed head of the theoretical studies program. In 2014, HaMidrasha Gallery opened at 19 Hayarkon Street in Tel Aviv. In 2015, artist Gabi Klezmer was appointed Dean of the Faculty.

HaMidrasha – Faculty of the Arts teaches Israel's artists and filmmakers who hold productive and lively dialogue with the world of contemporary art. The faculty's programs work to enable the student to develop independent thinking and to establish their own unique artistic path. The faculty is headed by Dean Guy Ben-Ner and includes the Art Department, the Film Department, and the Department of Art Therapy. The Art Department is the only institution in Israel that combines Fine Art studies with the training of artists-teachers towards a bachelor's degree, a graduate of Arts Teaching, as well as the dual-discipline program for teaching of art theory and another field of the student's choice from the Faculty of Society and Culture. The Department of Art also includes the master's degree program in Art Education, the Master of Art Therapy program-Visual Arts, the program of continuing education for young artists who have received their undergraduate degree, and certificate studies in art. The Film Department includes a program for undergraduate studies in cinema and film teaching, as well as documentary studies in cinema. The Film Department has partnered with The Robert Weil Family Foundation to create the Weil Foundation Film Fund, which promotes filmmaking by Palestinian students.

== Faculty of Society and Culture ==
The Faculty of Society and Culture offers courses and teaching programs in a variety of fields in social sciences and humanities. Headed by Dean Nurit Buchweitz, the faculty teaches courses in the fields of social sciences and citizenship, literature, bible studies, Jewish culture, Arabic, languages, history, and Israeli studies and geography for teacher training. In addition, the faculty conducts courses in criminology and law enforcement, social-organizational management, security and homeland security, and gender studies. The teaching staff includes lecturers and experts with extensive experience in their field.

== See also ==
- Education in Israel
