= Tamar Ariav =

Israeli academic

- תמר אריאב
- Born: 1949 (age 76–77)
- Occupation: Professor of Education
- Known for: Academic Director of the Jack, Joseph and Morton Mandel Foundation - Israel and President of Beit Berl College

Tamar Ariav (Hebrew: תמר אריאב; born 1949) is an Israeli associate professor of education. She is the Academic Director of the Jack, Joseph and Morton Mandel Foundation in Israel. Ariav served as president of Beit Berl College in 2008–2020.

== Biography ==
Tamar Ariav was born in Haifa. She attended Rotberg High School in Ramat HaSharon and served in the Israeli Air Force, where she trained pilots on a flight simulator.

Ariav holds a B.A. in Economics and Statistics from Tel Aviv University, an M.A. in Curriculum Planning from Tel Aviv University, and a Ph.D. in Curriculum and Instruction from the University of Pennsylvania. She also holds a teaching certificate from Tel Aviv University, and is a graduate of its Directors and Senior Executives course.

Ariav lives in Ra'anana with her husband Gadi Ariav, a professor emeritus in the Coller School of Management at Tel Aviv University. She is the mother of Yotam Ariav, a partner with Boston Consulting Group (BCG), and Inbar Ariav, an entrepreneur in the jewelry business.

== Pedagogic and academic career ==
Ariav's teaching career began in 1971, as a teacher of mathematics in the Israeli schools, and afterwards in Germany and the United States. After completing her doctorate, Ariav served as Director of Israeli Teaching Consortium in North America (managing curriculum development in teams from various U.S. and Canadian states) and acted as Director of Visual Resources Network in Jewish education under the Jewish Education Service of North America (JESNA). Ariav served as a guest lecturer in the Department of Teacher Education at the University of California, Irvine (UCI). She has served on national policy committees of the Ministry of Education, in committees that provide awards and research grants such as ISF, the Committee for Value in Research Initiative in Education, and as a member of Teacher Training Conferences Committees.

Between 2002 and 2008, Ariav was a member of the Council for Higher Education (MLAG), under which she served as chair of academic committees, such as the Academic Management Committee for Israeli Colleges and the New Guidelines in Teacher Training Committee, which set professional standards for teacher training at a national level.

From 2008 to 2013, Ariav served as Chair of RMA, the forum of 21 heads of colleges of education across Israel. Ariav has been on the faculty of Beit Berl College since 1985. During her tenure, in addition to teaching at the college, she filled a range of roles: Head of the Educational Sciences Unit, Head of the Center for Curriculum Planning, Chair of the Academic Council, and Head of the Master's Program in Curriculum Planning and Assessment. She has also served as chair of the college's Steering Committee of the Honors Program and Chair of the Planning and Development Committee.

In 2008, Ariav was appointed President of Beit Berl College, a role she held until 2020, after serving the maximum term in office. One of her key actions as President of the college was the transition from the auspices of the Ministry of Education to the supervision of the Planning and Budgeting Committee of the Council of Higher Education. Since 2015, once Beit Berl College transitioned to the Council of Higher Education, the college has been able to promote new academic programs, transfer some faculty members to the terms of employment as specified in the higher education system, and promote campus development according to the needs of teachers and educators in the current era.

Among her major initiatives as president of the college are the internationalization of the college, which now maintains over 25 global academic relationships in teaching, research, and projects in partnership with foreign academic institutions. She founded the research authority, the Center for Teaching and Learning, Center for the Advancement of Shared Society, the Center for Haredi Studies and Center for Entrepreneurship.

Ariav led the development of clinical training in teaching, and use of technology in teaching and learning. These moves reflect her ideology of developing academic quality while diversifying the college's student population. Under her presidency, the college expanded its academic portfolio and embarked on graduate tracks with thesis projects, and built innovative learning spaces.

In March 2021, Ariav was appointed Academic Director of the Jack, Joseph and Morton Mandel Foundation - Israel. She has helped to develop the Mandel School of Educational Leadership (MSEL) program and create academic synergy across various programs run by the Mandel Foundation.

== Research focus ==
Ariav's research encompasses curriculum and teaching policies, from the training phase to professional development. She lectures in various forums and writes in popular publishing about issues in education and higher education. Ariav has been a member of editorial boards for journals and serves as editor for journals.

Ariav sees higher education as a means of social mobility, promoting social justice, and reducing inequality in society and the job market. Within higher education, she sees teacher development as a vital investment in the improvement of the education system in Israel.
