= Doron Solomons =

Doron Solomons דורון סולומונס
- Born: 1969 (age 56–57); London, England
- Education: Art Teachers' Training College, Ramat Hasharon
- Known for: Video artist

Doron Solomons (Hebrew: דורון סולומונס; born 1969) is an Israeli video artist.

== Biography ==
Doron Solomons is a video artist born in London. In 1994-1991, he studied at the HaMidrasha – Faculty of the Arts, Ramat Hasharon. He lives and works in Ramat Gan.

== Art career ==
Since 2000, Solomon's artistic work has been influenced by his experience as a professional news editor, the materials to which he is exposed in this capacity, and the ethical problems posed.

== Teaching ==
- Kalisher School of Art, Tel Aviv
- Art Teachers' Training College, Ramat Hasharon

== Awards and recognition ==
- 1998 2004 The Minister of Education, Culture and Sport Prize, The Ministry of Education, Culture and Sport
- 2006 The Hadassah and Rafael Klatchkin Prize, Artic 9, The Sharett Foundation, America-Israel Cultural Foundation

== Video art ==
- The Long Arm of the Law (2002)
- Inventory (2001) - Doron Solomons reviews his life about the material inventory of all his belongings. Beginning with his wife to counting all the cassette tapes and things in his life, Solomons reflects on materialism as a whole and the proprietary relationship between a man and a woman.
- Group Picture with a War (2005) – commissioned by the In Flanders Fields Museum to create a work from their collection of films dating back to World War I, Solomons unsurprisingly chose all the “behind-the-scenes” depictions, gaps, and intervals between battles: the men in the trenches, sleeping, treating the wounded.
- Tonight’s Headlines (2006) – in this work we find the newest version of the “eloquent silence” series running through Solomons’ oeuvre. The work starts like an ordinary night edition of the news on Israeli Channel 2, but when the time comes for the anchors to announce the headlines, they stare at the camera, without uttering a word. They keep the gestures and body language characteristic of the media just as much as the spoken language itself.
- Shopping Day (2006), Solomons directly addresses the language of advertising and branding industries and their limited filmic lexicon. Using his editorial skill and editing language, he manages to subvert the message and create a drama of a daily and minor tragedy showing not only himself, but also this visual language, as pathetic.
- Good night (2008) - A father reads his son a bedtime story but falls asleep. The son covers, and in the end, smothers the father. The work refers to the reality of sons who bury their father and considers the local harsh reality of fathers burying their sons.

== Articles ==
- From Haifa to London and back, Haaretz - Guide, October 22, 2010
- The Old Objectivity, Haaretz - Gallery, August 13, 2010

== See also ==
- Israeli art
