= Gaston Zvi Ickowicz =

Israeli artist

Gastón Zvi Ickowicz
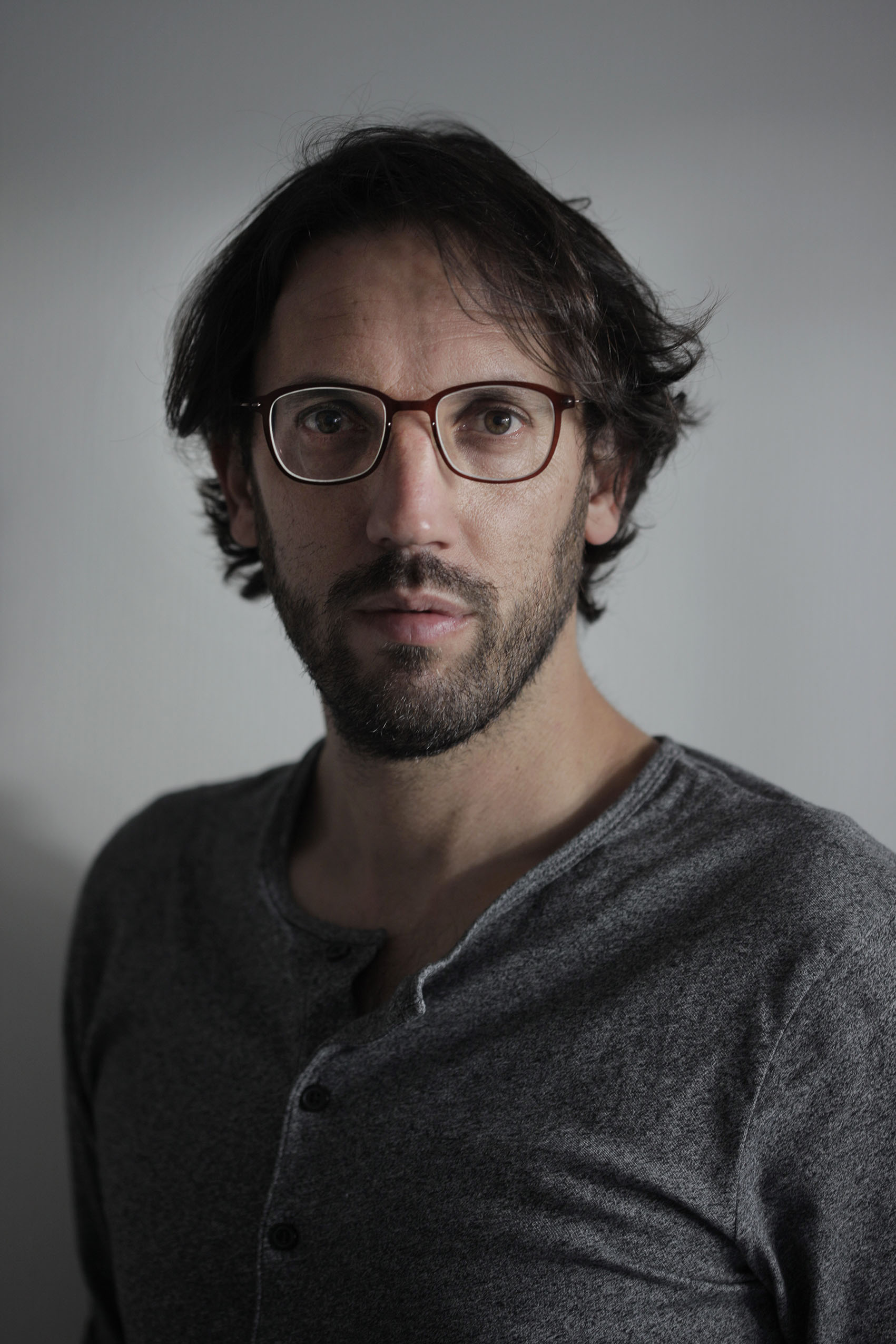
- Gastón Zvi Ickowicz
- Born: גסטון צבי איצקוביץ; 1974 (age 51–52); Buenos Aires, Argentina
- Known for: Photography
- Website: http://www.gastonickowicz.com

Gastón Zvi Ickowicz (Hebrew: גסטון צבי איצקוביץ; born 1974, Buenos Aires) is an Argentine-born Israeli visual artist living and working in Tel Aviv.

== Biography ==
Gaston Ickowicz immigrated to Israel from Argentina in 1980 at the age of 6. He studied photography at Naggar School of Photography, Media, New Music, Visual Communication and Phototherapy in Musrara, Jerusalem from 1997 till 2000. Ickowicz received MFA in art and photography from Bezalel School of Arts and Design in 2008. Ickowicz works are in permanent collections of Tel Aviv Museum of Art, Haifa Museum of Art, Museum on the Seam in Jerusalem, Ashdod Art Museum and private collections.

== Work ==
Ickowicz mainly works in video and photography and centers on the interaction between people and landscape in a socio-political context. His work entertains a dialogue with the Israeli sphere and touches some of the conflicts it contains.

I see the photographic act as enabling me to approach reality, with all of its complexity, with a greater degree of precision; in this context, the mediating presence of the camera acts as an index of sorts, which offers the possibility of a more direct observation of reality. − Ickowicz

The difference between "landscape" and "place" is one of Ickowics's main subjects. His work examines the relations between these two concepts, as well as their potential to change following their definition as such and the perspective from which they are viewed.

He is interested in how the photographic act can transform a landscape, which may only be examined as a static image, into a place with a dynamic quality, an act that enables him to study various components of the landscapes identity.

Ickowicz captures sights and traces that remain in the aftermath of various events; a spent bonfire, a scorched field burnt in the course of a military bombing, an avalanche in the desert, rocks used to create a roadblock, or the ruins of an ancient settlement. This strategy documents the traces of different processes and events that took place in the past, and is directed at exploring definitions of memory, history, and culture as they are revealed through the signs captured by the camera.

The journeys in which these images are taken are also related to a more general existential state, which involves a search for roots and for a sense of belonging. In this context, the concept of time is expanded: inevitably, the present, or "here-and-now" captured in these works, is viewed in relation to a chronological axis that constantly echoes the past.

== Exhibitions ==
=== Solo ===
- 2003 Buenos Aires – Good Air, Hagar Gallery, Jaffa
- 2005 Chapters from a Settlement, Haifa Museum of Art
- 2007 The Pale, Tavi Dresdner Gallery, Tel Aviv
- 2008 The Pale, Habres & Partner Gallery, Vienna
- 2010 Cubit, Span, Foot, Chelouche Gallery for Contemporary Art, Tel Aviv
- 2011 "B.C.", Tel Aviv Museum of Art
- 2012 Untitled (Explosion), Department of Photographic Communication Gallery, Hadassah Academic College, Jerusalem
- 2013 The Rock and the Stone, Bazel Gallery, Tel Aviv
- 2015 "Everyday Ceremonies", Hezi Cohen Gallery, Tel Aviv
- 2016 "Nesting", Center for Contemporary Art, Tel Aviv
- 2017 "The Earth is Heavy, and its Weight Pulls Downwards". "La Cite International des Arts", Paris.

=== Group ===
2017

- Since the Breath of Primeval Time. Inga Gallery for Contemporary Art. Tel Aviv

2016

- VideoVideo: Video Art Festival, Burgundy, France
- Deads Lands, NurtureArt Gallery, New York
- Visions of Places, Center for the Arts Gallery, Towson University, Towson, Maryland

2014

- Double Exposure, Project #2, The Shpilman Institute for Photography, Tel Aviv
- Secular Judaism, Nahum Gutman Museum of Art, Tel Aviv

2013

- Collecting Dust in Contemporary Israeli Art, The Israel Museum, Jerusalem
- Vacatio, Fotografia: International Photography Festival, MACRO Museum of Contemporary Art, Rome
- Beyond No-Man's Land: Journey Across a Landscape of Identities, Andrea Meislin Gallery, New York

2012

- Another Place: Artists Respond to Outdoor Works by Itzhak Danziger, Dana Gallery, Yad Mordechai
- Teen Spirit / Musrara: A Social Manifesto, GRID 2012: International Photography Biennale, Amsterdam

2011

- Making Room: Contemporary Israeli Photography, Tel Aviv Museum of Art, Tel Aviv
- Southern Spirit, The Negev Museum of Art, Beersheba

2010

- Work in Progress, The Israel Museum, Jerusalem
- Comes with the Territory, Sommer Contemporary Art, Tel Aviv; Charim Ungar Contemporary, Berlin
- Grandfather Paradox, Chelouche Gallery for Contemporary Art, Tel Aviv

2009

- Neighbors, Chelouche Gallery for Contemporary Art, Tel Aviv
- Neues Sehen: Young Israeli Art, Syker Vorwerk Center for Contemporary Art, Germany; Dollinger Art Project, Tel Aviv

2008

- Contemporary Israeli Art: The Current Generation, Municipal Museum, Bremen, Germany
- Silverstein Photography Annual: Curatorial Nominees, Bruce Silverstein Gallery, New York
- Art of the State: Contemporary Photography and Video from Israel, Joods Historisch Museum, Amsterdam
- Real Time: Art in Israel 1998-2008, The Israel Museum, Jerusalem

2007

- Displacements, MoBY – David Ben-Ari Museum for Contemporary Art, Bat Yam
- Bare Life, Museum on the Seam, Jerusalem
- Engagement: Israeli Photography Now, The Israel Museum, Jerusalem

2006

- The Making of a City, Ashdod Art Museum, Ashdod
- Disengagement, Tel Aviv Museum of Art, Tel Aviv
- A Road to Nowhere, Ashdod Art Museum, Ashdod

2005

- Other Voices, Other Rooms, Le Ciminiere Exhibition Center, Catania, Sicily Puntos Cardinales, PS122, New York

2004

- Nazar: Noorderlicht Foundation Photofestival, Groningen, the Netherlands;

in 2005 traveled as Houston Fotofest to Houston, Texas; and the Gallery of Photography, Dublin, Ireland Field of Depth, Latin Collector, New York

2003

- The Photography Biennale of Plovdiv, Bulgaria

== Awards and scholarships ==
2003

- Artist-Teacher Scholarship, Ministry of Culture and Sport

2008

- America-Israel Cultural Foundation Prize
- The Gérard Lévy Prize for a Young Photographer, The Israel Museum, Jerusalem

2010

- Young Artist Award, Ministry of Culture and Sport
