= Boaz Arad =

Israeli visual artist

Boaz Arad בועז ארד
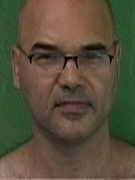
- Born: 16 March 1956; Tel Aviv, Israel
- Died: 2 February 2018 (aged 61); Tel Aviv, Israel
- Occupation: Visual artist
- Known for: Photography
- Movement: Israeli art
- Website: boazarad.net

Boaz Arad (Hebrew: בועז ארד; 16 March 1956 – 2 February 2018) was an Israeli visual artist. He worked in a variety of media including painting, sculpture, photography, and video.

== Biography ==
Arad was born in Tel Aviv in 1956. Arad studied art at the Avni Institute of Art and Design in Tel Aviv in 1978–1982.

His work is in collections of a number of museums, including the Israel Museum in Jerusalem.

In 2003, Arad was a recipient of a Prize for the "Encouragement of Creative Art", awarded by the Israeli Ministry of Education and Culture.

== Controversy ==
On 1 February 2018, the Israeli news portal Mako reported that Boaz Arad was under investigation for alleged sexual relationships with female students at the Thelma Yellin School of Art in Givatayim where he taught from 1983 until 2006. The article included an interview with one of the students, who related that the relationship started when she was 16 and lasted for four years, partly after she graduated from the school. She said that she knew about other female students who had had relationships with Arad. According to the report, Arad asked the student to keep the relationship secret and when she reached 18, she moved in with him. After the story was published, Arad was contacted by Mako and confirmed he had had relationships with the women indicated in the report, but denied the fact they started while the women were students in the school. He also complained that from the moment the story broke out, he had no reason to live, leading to Mako asking the police to check on him. The police briefly detained Arad, but later released him, stating his life was not in danger.

== Death ==
On Friday morning, 2 February 2018, Arad's body was found hanging in the garden of his home. Israeli police said his death was being treated as a suicide. He was 61.

On 26 July 2018 Mako issued an apology clarifying that at no point was it their intention to claim that Arad was involved at any time in a forced or non-consensual relations.

== Awards ==
- 2016 – Mendel and Eva Pundik Prize for Israeli Art, Tel Aviv Museum of Art
- 2006 – The Petach Tikva Museum of Art Prize
- 2004 – Prize to Encourage Creativity, The Israeli Ministry of Science, Culture and Sport

== Exhibitions ==
Arad exhibited in Israel and around the world. His work was included in the exhibition Staring Back At The Sun: Video Art From Israel, 1970–2012 at the Koffler Centre of the Arts in Toronto.

=== Solo exhibitions ===
- 2019 – Weeping Willow, Rosenfeld Gallery, Tel Aviv
- 2017 – "1+0+1=2″, Rosenfeld Gallery, Tel Aviv
- 2016 – Behind all this Hides a Great Happiness, Rosenfeld Gallery, Tel Aviv
- 2015 – The Collector – Dana Gallery, Yad Mordehay
- 2013 – The Life, Rosenfeld Gallery, Tel Aviv
- 2012 – Sussita, Rosenfeld Gallery, Tel Aviv
- 2013 – The Sky is Blue Because We Live Inside the Eye of a Blue-Eyed Giant
- 2011 – Folk Tune, Rosenfeld Gallery, Tel Aviv
- 2011 – Boaz Arad, Video and Photography, The Morel Derfler Gallery, Vizo Academy, Haifa
- 2009 – Kings of Israel, Rosenfeld Gallery, Tel Aviv
- 2009 – Hitler and I, virtual exhibition, Bezalel's History & Theory website (http://bezalel.secured.co.il/zope/home/he/1252746792/1253422292)
- 2009 – Screenings, Tegen 2 Gallery, Stockholm, Sweden
- 2008 – Oi Va'avoi, Rosenfeld Gallery, Tel Aviv
- 2007 – Boaz Arad: VoozVooz, The Center for Contemporary Art, Tel Aviv (cat.)
- 1986 – Mapu Gallery, Tel Aviv
- 1985 – Chelouche Gallery, Tel Aviv

== Videography ==
Arad created the following video works:

- 2015 – The collector
- 2006 – The Annunciation, 5 min
- 2005 – Gefiltefish, 11 min
- 2004 – Until When?, 4:30 min
- 2003 – Dual Movie, with Elyasaf Kowner, 12 min
- 2003 – 21:40, with Miki Kratsman, 6:30 min
- 2003 – Gordon and I, 4:30 min
- 2003 – Lattice, with Tsibi Geva and Miki Kratsman, 53 min
- 2003 – Kelev Andalusi, 15 min (after Salvador Dalם and Luis Buסuel's Un Chien Andalou)
- 2002 – Loop, unlimited duration
- 2002 – Canal Street, 2 min
- 2002 – Untitled, with Miki Kratsman, 40 min
- 2001 – Immense Inner Peace, 6:30 min
- 2000 – Hebrew Lesson, 12 sec
- 2000 – Marcel Marcel, 27 sec
- 1999 – The Man, 6 min
- 1999 – 100 Beats, 1 min
- 1999 – Safam (Mustache), 30 sec
- 1999 – Safam 2, 13 sec
