= Catharina Ziekenhuis =

Coordinates: 51.4658°N 5.4717°E

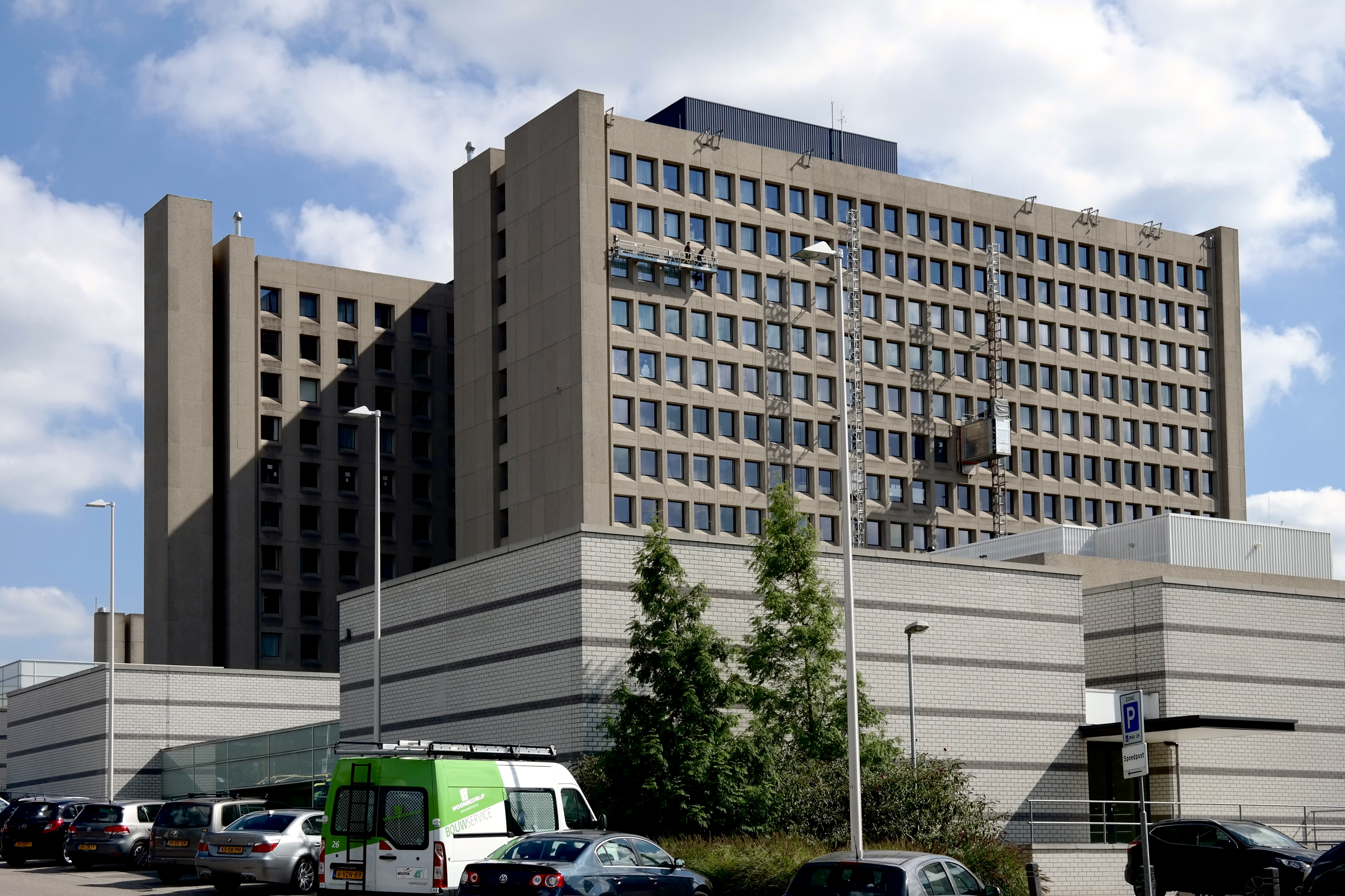
- Catharina Ziekenhuis Eindhoven

Geography
- Location: Eindhoven, North Brabant, Netherlands

Organisation
- Type: Teaching
- Affiliated university: Maastricht University; Radboud University Nijmegen

Services
- Standards: Qualicor Europe
- Emergency department: Yes
- Beds: 392 (september 2023)
- Speciality: Cardiology, heart surgery, oncology

History
- Founded: 1843

Links
- Website: www.catharinaziekenhuis.nl
- Lists: Hospitals in Netherlands

Former logo

Catharina Ziekenhuis (English: Catharina Hospital) is the largest general hospital in Eindhoven. It is located on Michelangelolaan in Woensel. The Catharina Hospital is a top clinical and top referral teaching hospital. Due to the lack of an academic hospital within a short distance, it provides highly specialized care at an academic level. Its supraregional focal points are oncology (with the Catharina Cancer Institute, including a radiotherapy department) and cardiovascular diseases (with the largest heart and vascular center in the Netherlands).

It is one of the eight non-university hospitals authorized for open-heart surgery. As a training center for doctors and nurses, it has close ties with Maastricht University Medical Center Plus (Maastricht UMC+) and Eindhoven University of Technology. As a result of this collaboration, 17 professors are employed at the hospital, including Lukas Dekker, Ignace de Hingh, Chairman of the Board Nardo van der Meer, Huib van Vliet, Misha Luyer and Pim Tonino.

The Catharina Hospital is also a member of Santeon, a collaborative group of seven major top clinical hospitals in the Netherlands, focused on quality improvement and innovation.

== History ==
In 1843, at the request of the parish council of the Sint Catharina parish in Eindhoven, seven religious sisters from the Sisters of Charity congregation in Tilburg came to Eindhoven to establish healthcare services. Over the years, this evolved into the Roman Catholic Inner Hospital. For many years, it was located on Vestdijk in the city center, where the Heuvel Galerie now stands.

By the early 1960s, this hospital was outdated and too small. In the summer of 1968, preparations began for new construction on Michelangelolaan in Woensel. The building was completed in the summer of 1973. During the same period, the hospital was negatively in the news due to disagreements within the thoracic surgery department about the performance of one of the heart surgeons. The move to the new building was used as an opportunity to change the name to Sint Catharina Hospital.

== Name ==
The hospital is named after Saint Catherine of Alexandria, the namesake of the Catharina Church from which the initiative to establish the hospital originated. In the Roman Catholic tradition, Catherine is considered the patron saint of hospitals.

== Further Notables ==
In 2004, gynecological oncologist Jurgen Piek was the first in the world to demonstrate that abnormalities indicating precursor stages of cancer in women with a hereditary increased risk of ovarian cancer are not found in the ovaries, but in the fallopian tubes. Later research from other groups worldwide has confirmed this and provides evidence that in at least 60% of non-hereditary cases of ovarian cancer, the fallopian tube is the origin of the cancer.

In 2009, Catharina Hospital was the driving force behind a small but significant adjustment to the angioplasty technique. This led to a worldwide decrease in the number of deaths following angioplasty procedures. The change stemmed from an international study led by two cardiologists from Catharina Hospital: Pim Tonino and Nico Pijls. The study involved one thousand heart patients from twenty hospitals in Europe and the United States. The results were promptly published by the world-renowned medical journal The New England Journal of Medicine.

In 2022, Ferdi Akca became the first heart surgeon in the Netherlands to perform a bypass operation without opening the breastbone with a reciprocating saw. During his training as a heart surgeon, he observed colleagues successfully using minimally invasive surgeries for heart valve replacements. He became convinced that this technique could also be applied to bypass surgeries. In 2024, he began sharing this knowledge with colleagues from both within the Netherlands and abroad.

In 2022, Catharina Hospital launched the Value-Based Healthcare program, also known as Value-Based Care. The program is based on Value-Based Health Care principles. The hospital is working to extract key data on outcomes of care, cost of care, and process quality for a number of conditions. Improvement cycles are implemented for each condition. In 2022, the first 13 conditions were selected, and by the following year, the program expanded to include 20 conditions, predominantly in cardiology and oncology, with other conditions such as maternity care and extreme obesity also selected.

In 2023, Catharina Hospital launched a home monitoring center. Home monitoring allows patients to measure values (e.g., blood sugar or blood pressure) at home via an app on their mobile or tablet and enter the data. Specialized monitoring nurses at the center keep track of recovery in real time via screens and headsets, offering advice when necessary. The benefit is that patients need to visit the hospital less often for routine check-ups. The monitoring center at Catharina Hospital supports various care paths, including COPD, COVID, influenza, gestational diabetes, heart failure, and strokes.

Catharina Hospital closely collaborates with other healthcare institutions, such as Bernhoven Hospital in Uden, Máxima MC in Eindhoven/Veldhoven, Anna Hospital in Geldrop, and Trauma Center Brabant in Tilburg. Since 2024, the heart surgeons at Catharina Hospital have been assisting the trauma surgeons at Elisabeth-TweeSteden Hospital (ETZ) when a patient suffers from a stab or gunshot wound to the heart.

Catharina Hospital also has a research fund, the Catharina Health Foundation, which is dedicated to funding scientific research at the hospital. This is necessary because the hospital does not receive government funding for scientific research; only academic hospitals do. As a top-clinical hospital, Catharina Hospital must seek alternative sources of funding for research.
