= David Reeb =

Israeli-born artist

David Reeb דוד ריב
- Born: 1952 (age 73–74)
- Known for: Painting
- Movement: Israeli art

David Reeb (Hebrew: דוד ריב; born 1952) is an Israeli-born artist.

== Biography ==
David Reeb was born in Rehovot, Israel, in 1952.

He has shown work in Documenta X at Kassel, the Ankara, Kwangju, Havana and Berlin Biennales, "In Focus: Living History," Tate Modern, London and in various museums and galleries in the U.S., Austria, Germany, Sweden and elsewhere. He has had one-person exhibitions at the Tel Aviv Museum, the Israel Museum (together with Miki Kratsman), Haifa Museum, Umm El Fahem Gallery, Stadtische Kunsthalle, Düsseldorf, Haus Am Lutzowplatz, Berlin, and various other galleries and museums.

Some of his work consists of figurative paintings after photographs and video stills. While previously he used news photographers’ images, especially those of Miki Kratsman, since 2006, he has been making these paintings primarily after his own source material. He also often exhibits video. Mainly during the 1980s and 90s, he helped organise cooperative activities, generally in the form of common exhibitions, with Palestinian and Israeli artists.

Reeb is an activist against the Israeli occupation of Palestinian land. He has been documenting protests by Palestinian villages together with Israeli and international activists acting in solidarity since 2005.

== See also ==
- Visual arts in Israel
