= Guy Ben-Ner =

Israeli video artist

Guy Ben-Ner גיא בן נר
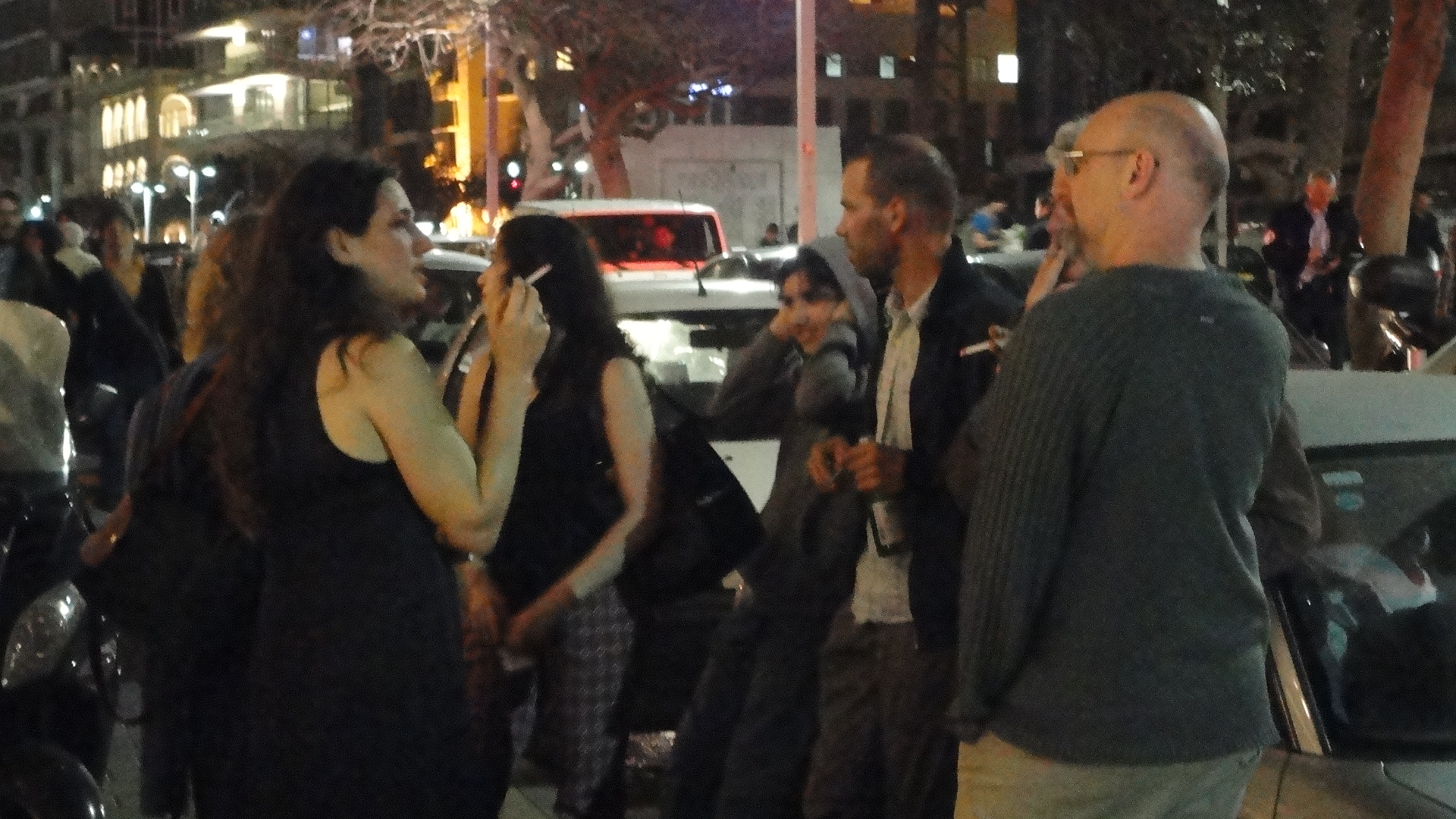
- Born: 1969 (age 56–57); Ramat Gan, Israel
- Education: HaMidrasha School of Art, Israel, Columbia University, New York
- Known for: Video artist

Guy Ben-Ner (Hebrew: גיא בן נר; born 1969) is an Israeli video artist. He lives and works in Tel Aviv, Berlin and New York City.

== Biography ==
Guy Ben-Ner received a Bachelor of Arts in Education in 1997 from Hamidrasha School of Art and a Master of Fine Arts from Columbia University in New York City in 2003. At Columbia, he studied under the critic Jerry Saltz. He is Dean of Hamidrasha School of Art at Beit Berl College.

== Art career ==
Since the early 1990s, Ben-Ner has filmed a series of short videos starring himself and his family, often using the intimate spaces of their home as an ad hoc set, studio, and fantastical playroom. His works are often exhibited with the simple sets and props created for the videos.

A recurring theme in Ben-Ner’s early videos is the tedium and isolation experienced by a stay-at-home parent. Ben-Ner’s first narrative video, Berkeley’s Island (1999), based on Daniel Defoe’s Robinson Crusoe (1719), depicts the solitary life of a castaway. Set in the family kitchen, it opens with a scene of the artist lying on his back in a bathing suit on a meter-wide pile of sand from which a lone palm tree grows, with a steering wheel across his bare, sunburned chest. The 15-minute video features several vignettes about life on the island, which Ben-Ner narrates in a voice-over. The plot does not follow Defoe’s exactly, though notable moments in the book are re-created, such as the castaway discovering a footprint and training a parrot (played by the family cat) to say his name. The castaway has delusions; he sees himself levitating and losing a limb—simplistic magic tricks that Ben-Ner stages using mirrors. To depict a raging gale, Ben-Ner rigs the palm tree with ropes that are pulled by someone offscreen.

Wild Boy (2004), an adaptation of François Truffaut's 1970 film L'enfant sauvage (The Wild Child), can be shown in two forms: alone, or incorporated into an installation that re-creates a woodland set that the artist built in his kitchen, complete with a tree and a carpeted hill on which visitors may sit to watch the video. In Stealing Beauty (2007), the artist's family staged guerrilla theater in IKEA showrooms: Moving among the displays, they conduct a reasonable facsimile of family life; dishes are done, discipline imposed, discussions held (private property is a topic), and everyone tucks in for the night — in numerous beds — as IKEA's other customers wander through. In 2009, Ben-Ner participated in the Performa Biennial (curated by RoseLee Goldberg) creating his work Drop the Monkey.

In Foreign Names (2012), Ben Ner visited nearly 100 Aroma Espresso Bar locations, left a fake name in English that would be called out at the counter when his beverage was ready, then edited all the videotaped segments to create an "ode" lamenting the disappearance of waiters. Soundtrack (2013) takes an eleven-minute scene from Steven Spielberg's 2005 movie War of the Worlds as a "ready-made" soundtrack and pairs it with footage shot in Ben Ner's kitchen in Tel Aviv, with smashing plates and combusting appliances.

Ben-Ner’s 2016 video, Escape artists, was acquired by The Israel Museum, Jerusalem, in March 2019. The work consists of two years of weekly video lessons that Ben-Ner gave to Sudanese and Eritrean asylum seekers at the Holot Detention Center in the Negev desert. He uses the medium of film to mirror the refugees' difficult reality, and uses that same reality to reveal cinematic tricks and illusions. Because of this style, the film viewer learns about the lives and circumstances of the refugees in addition to learning lessons about filmmaking.

== Exhibitions ==
Ben-Ner represented Israel in the 2005 Venice Biennale. He also had solo exhibitions at the Center for Contemporary Art, Tel Aviv (2006); Center for Contemporary Photography, Melbourne (2006); Musée d'art contemporain de Montréal, Montreal (2007); L'Espace Shawinigan of the National Gallery of Canada (2008); and the Massachusetts Museum of Contemporary Art (2009). His work is currently in a group show titled Uncommon Commonalities at Aspect/Ratio in Chicago, IL.

== Awards and recognition ==
- 1994 Ingeborg Bachman Scholarship, established by Anselm Kiefer, Wolf Foundation
- 2007 Preis des Internationalen Wettbewerbs: KunstFilmBiennale, Köln/Cologne, Germany
- 2008 The Sandberg Prize for Israeli Art, Israel Museum, Jerusalem, Israel

== See also ==
- Visual arts in Israel
