= Esther Shalev-Gerz =

Lithuanian-born French artist (born 1948)

Esther Shalev-Gerz (born Gilinsky) is a contemporary artist. She lives and works in Paris.

== Biography ==
Esther Shalev-Gerz was born in Vilnius, Lithuania in 1948. In 1957, she moved with her family to Jerusalem.

From 1975 to 1979 she studied Fine arts at the Bezalel Academy of Art and Design where she got her Bachelor of Fine Arts. She then lived in New York City for one year (1980/81).

From 1981 she participated in collective exhibitions in institutions such as the Israel Museum in Jerusalem and the Tel Aviv Museum of Art.

In 1983 she produced her first work in public space: Oil on Stone, a permanent installation in Tel Hai, Israel, for the Tel Hai Contemporary Art Meeting.

In 1984 the artist moved to Paris and started working through Europe and Canada.

In 1990 she got an artistic residency from the German Academic Exchange Service and moved to Berlin for one year.

In 2002 she stayed at the IASPIS residency in Stockholm.

From 2003 to 2014 she taught the Master of Fine Arts students in Valand Academy, University of Gothenburg, Sweden.

Her latest major exhibitions were Ton Image me Regarde?!, 2010, in the Galerie nationale du Jeu de Paume, Paris, in which ten of her installations were displayed and her retrospective entitled Between Telling and Listening, 2012, in the Cantonal Museum of Fine Arts in Lausanne, where she presented 15 of her installations. Besides, her work was the subject of an itinerary personal exhibition in Canada between 2012 and 2014, firstly in the Kamloops Art Gallery, then in the Belkin Art Gallery, UBC, Vancouver and finally in the Galerie de l'UQAM, Montreal.

In 2010 she received a three-year grant from the Swedish Research Council for her Artistic Research project Trust and the Unfolding Dialogue.

In 2012, she had the exhibition of her work, Describing Labor she created inspired by the collection of in The Wolfsonian-Florida International University, Miami Beach, USA

In 2013 was released the illustrated anthology Esther Shalev-Gerz, The Contemporary Art of Trusting Uncertainties and Unfolding Dialogues edited by Jason E. Bowman that gathers new texts around Shalev-Gerz's work and the notion of Trust as well as formerly published texts on her art. Among the authors are Jacques Rancière, Georges Didi-Huberman, Jacqueline Rose, James E. Young, Lisa Le Feuvre.

In 2014 her team is one of the six finalists of the competition for the design of the Canadian National Holocaust Monument in Ottawa, with the teams of Yael Bartana, Daniel Libeskind, Krzysztof Wodiczko, David Adjaye or Gilles Saucier.

In 2015 the Fonds municipal d'art contemporain of the city of Geneva acquired the artwork Les Inséparables, 2000-2010, a monumental double-clock installed as a permanent work in public space.

In 2016, her retrospective Space Between time was exhibited in Wasserman Projects in Detroit.

In 2017 through 2018, The Factory is Outside, her first retrospective in Finland in the Selachius Museum Gustaf in Mänttä, Finland.

In 2018, she exhibited 4 projects dealing with participation in the Koffler Gallery, Toronto, Canada: The Gold Room, 2016, The Place of Art, 2004, First Generation, 2004, and four chapters of The Portrait of Stories, 1998-2008.

In 2018, Esther Shalev-Gerz's commission of a permanent art work The Shadow is an embedded ghostly silhouette of a first-growth Douglas fir across the expanse of University Commons Plaza. The work measures 100x25m in total and is composed of 24000 three-shade concrete pavers.

== Work overview ==
Esther Shalev-Gerz questions the perpetual construction of the relationship between an experience and the telling one gives of it. She analyses portraiture, which she understands as the reflection of a person, place or event. Her work invites the spectator to an opening to the ambiguities and multiplicities acting in the collective memory. Her installations, photography, video and public sculpture are developed through dialogue, consultation and negotiation with people whose participation provides an emphasis to their individual and collective memories, accounts, opinions and experiences. Constantly inquiring into transitional qualities of time and space and the correlative transformation of identities, locales and (hi)stories Esther Shalev-Gerz has produced a body of work that simultaneously records, critiques, and contributes to the understandings of the societal roles and value of artistic practice.

In her text entitled The Perpetual Movement of Memory, Shalev-Gerz describes her practice: "In my works in the public realm, a space is constructed for memories activated by participation, that is to say, the moment when the supposed spectator becomes a participant by writing his name, using his voice or sending in his photo. Thanks to the traces left during this acts, these participants keep the memory of their own participation in the work's procedure, which also bears witness to their responsibility to their own times."

In an interview with Marta Gili, director of the Jeu de Paume, Shalev-Gerz adds: "I try to enter the space that opens between listening and telling in order to get away from the logic of discourse, that is to say, to accede to another kind of space and consider it artistically. It's a kind of "reveal" of the intelligibility of the sensible/sensitive or of a memory that differs from the one constructed by words, akin to concepts that traverse the body, able to be picked up by the gaze."

And also: "As an artist, it is very important for me to trust the participants – whom I approach (right away) as equals, and whose contributions are an element of the project. I think that this is what makes it possible to produce the work: trust in the other person's intelligence."

In his text entitled The Image of the Other, in the catalogue of the exhibition Does Your Image Reflect Me? Ulrich Krempel provides his understanding of Shalev-Gerz' work: "One thing is certain: only by talking and listening, passing on first-hand experience, images, emotional glances and moments, can we bring ourselves to the point where remembrance is converted into action".

Jacques Rancière in his text The Work of the Image, for the catalogue of MenschenDinge/The Human Aspect of Objects, republished in the catalogue of the Jeu de Paume show, described the artist's work in these words: "Esther Shalev-Gerz does not give voice to the witnesses of the past or of elsewhere, but to researchers that are at work in the here and now. She makes the ones who come from elsewhere speak of the present as they do of the past, of here as of there. She makes them speak about the way they have thought and arrange the relationship between one place and another, one time and another. But also the dispositifs that she constructs are themselves dispositifs that distend their words, and subject them to representation of the conditions governing their listening and uttering."

In his text Blancs-soucis of History written for the catalogue of the exhibition Esther Shalev-Gerz: Entre l'écoute et la parole in the Musée Cantonal des Beaux-Arts in Lausanne, Switzerland, 2012, Georges Didi-Huberman describes the artist's work: "In her installations Esther Shalev-Gerz has never ceased to instigate dialogues, to give shape to interlocutory situations: she asks this and that person questions, she confronts faces and points of view, she worries about stories –even simple opportunities to smile –from everyone, she questions objects (like those found in the earth of Buchenwald camp in the work MenschenDinge –The Human Aspect of Objects, 2004-2006), practices (like photography), in the prism of each unique story, as in collective history. In doing so, she unceasingly questions transmission right down to its effects of disarray or perdition".

== Some projects and exhibitions ==
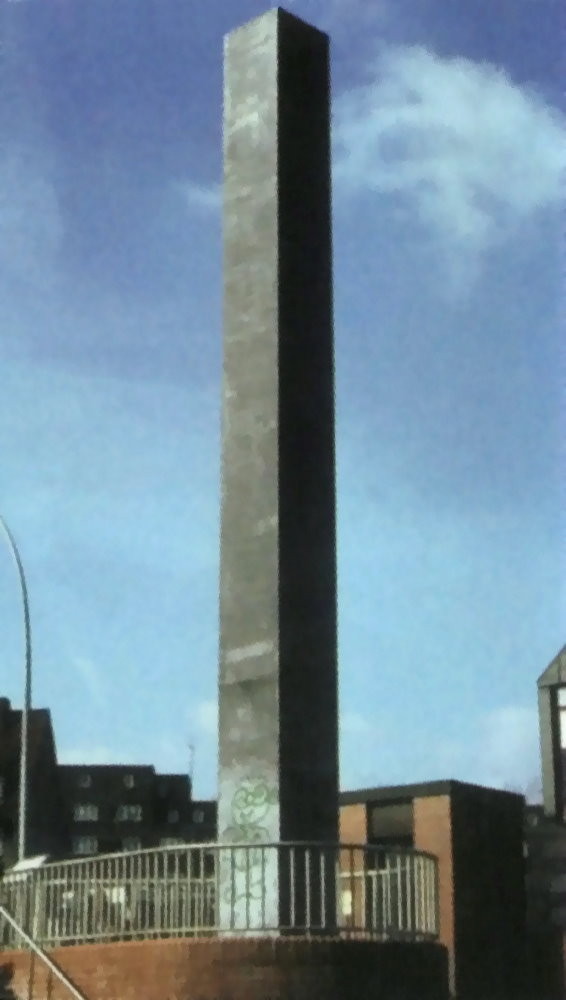
The "Monument Against Fascism" in 1986.

- Monument Against Fascism, Hamburg, Germany, 1986. Developed with Jochen Gerz via an international competition organized by the city of Hamburg-Harburg, the "Monument against Fascism" (1986–93) was a social experiment with an uncertain outcome. In a public square, the two artists erected column clad in lead beside which they provided a metal pencil and a panel with the following text translated in seven languages (English, French, German, Russian, Turk, Arabic and Hebrew): "We invite the citizens of Harburg, and visitors to the town, to add their names here to ours. In doing so we commit ourselves to remain vigilant. As more and more names cover this 12 metre-high lead column, it will gradually be lowered into the ground. One day it will have disappeared completely and the site of the Harburg monument against fascism will be empty. In the long run, it is only we ourselves who can stand up against injustice." Since 1993, when the last stage of the monument was sunk into the ground, only a one-square-metre lead plate, the cap of the column, has been visible, along with an information board. A photo sequence documents the process of its disappearance. The active participation and appropriation, which took a wide variety of forms, eventually led to the disappearance of the visible object over the years. It was covered with some 70,000 names, entries and graffiti (x loves y or "Foreigners Out!") and their strikeouts. Swastikas and even traces of gunshots were found in the lead coating.
- Erase the Past, Berlin, Germany, 1991. In 1990, during her residency in Berlin and just after the Fall of the Berlin Wall, Shalev-Gerz received as a present a portrait of Honecker sold off the street. She realized then this work as a slide series and a book both inspired by the flipbook. In the same room, one can see a portrait of Honecker or a portrait of Brecht. By flipping the images, one realizes that the portrait resists a zoom movement as it keeps the same size when the walls and furnitures shrink or enlarge.
- Irreparable, Musée de La Roche-sur-Yon, France, 1996. In her first solo show in France, Shalev-Gerz presented her photographic series Irreparable as well as 15 other slideshows such as Just One Sky, Homage to Lucy Schwob or Sea of Stones.
- The Berlin Inquiry, Berlin, Germany, 1998. She created with Jochen Gerz this interpretation of Peter Weiss' play Die Ermittlung, 1965. Weiss' play is composed with testimonies of victims, perpetrators, judges and witnesses in the Auschwitz trials. The artists' interpretation undermined the conventional distinctions between witnesses and actors by having the work performed by the audience. Over the five sold-out performances held in three theatres, Hebbel Theatre Berlin, Berliner Ensemble, Volksbühne am Rosa Luxemburg Platz, the course of each evening was determined by co-participation. Serving only as moderators, each theatre's company of actors would invite attendees (individually, as a group, a musical choir or as a crowd) to recite passages from the text, so that every spectator became an actor. Not simply a recalling, the collective participatory qualities of The Berlin Inquiry rendered passive witnessing impossible and in permanently lit auditoria new forms of memory and remembrance were authored.
- The Portraits of Stories, 1998 to 2008. Esther Shalev-Gerz developed for this project a video and photo series. In Aubervilliers, north of Paris, in Belzunce, a neighbourhood of Marseille, in Skoghall, Sweden and in Sandwell, United Kingdom, she asked the participants in her project "What story must be told today?" Then they would decide where and how they wanted to be filmed and they would tell the story of their choice. More than 200 people answered this question. Each installation was shown in the city where it was conceived. In 2008 an exhibition displaying all the interviews was held in England.
- Inseparable Angels: The Imaginary House of Walter Benjamin, 2000. This installation comprises a video of the artist's taxi ride between Weimar and Buchenwald, a series of photographs and two objects: a double-chair and a clock that has two faces – one showing time going forwards, the other backwards.
- White Out: Between Telling and Listening, Stockholm, 2002. During her researches Shalev-Gerz found out that there was no word war in the Sami language and that in parallel to that fact, Sweden had not participated in any war for over 200 years. Two screens facing each other show the same person. On one screen Asa Simma, a woman of dual culture, Sami and Swedish, speaks in her Stockholm apartment. On another video facing this one, she is in the landscape where she was born, in the North of Sweden, listening to her own words recorded in Stockholm.
- Does Your Image Reflect Me? 2002, Sprengel Museum, Hanover. In this work the artist created an encounter between two women who were not far away from each other during World War II. One is German and was living in Hanover, 40 km away from the Bergen-Belsen camp. The other is born in Poland and survived her internment in this very camp. On a photographic series and four screens, one can see each woman twice. As she is telling her story and as she is listening to the story of the other. It is only during the opening of the exhibition that they did really meet.
- First Generation, 2004, Sweden. For this permanent installation, Shalev-Gerz filmed in extreme close-ups the face of each of the 34 people from the first generation of immigrants as she/he listens to her/his answers to the questions: when arriving here, what did you lose? What did you find? What did you get? What did you give? This silent film is visible on the glass façade of the Multicultural Center Botkyrka. One can here their voice by entering the building.
- Between Listening and Telling: Last Witnesses, Auschwitz 1945-2005. In 2005 in commemoration of the liberation of the Auschwitz-Birkenau camp, Shalev-Gerz designed this project for the Hôtel de Ville, Paris. In the great Hall of the Hotel de Ville 60 little DVD players arranged on big tables would allow the visitors to watch the testimonies of 60 survivors collected on this occasion. In parallel to these a large silent video triptych was installed on the wall at the end of the hall. On each screen the same video with a 7 seconds lap: a slow motion edition of the moments of silence in the testimonies of the survivors, between the question and the answer, between a memory and a telling.
- A Thread, permanent installation, Castlemilk, south of Glasgow. From 2003 to 2006 Esther Shalev-Gerz developed a project in which ten groups of participants were invited to choose their favourite view in the former park of a castle near their new housing. At each point of view a circular bench was installed thus creating a path through the park.
- Menschendinge/The Human Aspect of Objects, 2006, The Buchenwald Memorial, Germany. For this project the artist invited 5 persons working in the Memorial to talk about different objects created or adapted by the prisoners. The archaeologist, the historian, the conservator, the director and the photograph tell the reconstructed or imagined stories of these objects in 5 videos and 25 photographs.
- Daedal(us), 2006, Dublin, Ireland. 24 photographs of façades were projected on other buildings of the same neighbourhood after the owners of these buildings agreed for this as well as those who accepted to host a projector during the month the project lasted. Photos of these projections were printed and exhibited.
- The Place of Art, 2006, Sweden. "How would you define art?" and "Where does it take place?" Shalev-Gerz collected the answers to these two questions from 38 artists living in the suburb of Gothenburg. A video was displayed in a shopping centre and four other in the Konsthalle, 7 km away from the mall.
- Echoes in Memory, 2007, The Maritime Museum, Greenwich, London. A project inspired by the rumours collected from the employees in the museum, especially about a now missing painting by Gentileschi. 2 HD videos, 24 3D digital images on aluminium, diasec-mounted, 1 soundtrack.
- Sound Machine, 2008, Sweden. An acoustic experimentation with 5 women who were pregnant while working in a factory and their now grown daughters. 2 synchronised HD projections. 6 texts on canvas.
- Still Film, Vilnius, 2009. A research by the artist of her mother's house in Lithuania. 11 photographs, a text, a video.
- Open Page, Canada, 2009. A photo series that captures the moment when employees from the Vancouver Public Library present the book they chose in the collection of rare publications, consultable only with authorization.
- On Two, Paris, 2010. The video encounter of two philosophers living in Paris. Rola Younes, the Lebanese who learns the languages of her neighbours in order to read their histories through them and the telling of a founding moment in the thinking and researches of Jacques Rancière. 2 HD projections, 12 photographs, a soundtrack.
- Last Click, 2010, Müseum für Photographie, Brunswick. A photo series following the wanderings of a camera in the emptying Rollei factory before its closure. In a video people who want to get rid of their analogic camera are telling the stories they lived together.
- Describing Labor, 2012, The Wolfsonian-FIU, Miami, USA. 24 participants from the art world describe in a video an artwork they chose among a selection of 41 artworks from the Wolfsonian collection, all depicting workers. Each of them is invited to displace this artwork among the objects of the collections in the storage where it is then photographed. The installation comprises a double HD projection, 24 photographs, a sound work gathering elements of the history of each artwork and his author, 20 glass hammers and 12 original musical composition. In 2020, the CNAP makes the acquisition of the installation to be part of its collection.
- In 2013, the artist had a one-woman show consisting of five installations at the Helen and Morris Belkin Art Gallery, University of British Columbia, Vancouver, Canada
- In 2014, La Mémoire en mouvement, a one-woman show of four installations at the Galerie de l'UQAM, Montreal, Canada.
- Asia Time: 1st Asia Biennial/5th Guangzhou Triennial, 2015, Guangzhou, China.
- The Gold Room, 2016, An Answer to Jorge Luis Borges' Text The Scandinavian Destiny. In this project, Esther Shalev-Gerz invited five historians to unfold the potential stories of five objects they selected from the collection of the Swedish History Museum, Stockholm. The History, provenance, belonging and destiny of most of these objects have been forgotten and are hardly traceable.The other five participants recently found refuge in Sweden. They had to decide very carefully what to take on the long journey of their flight. Through the stories about their one chosen object, they unfold their personal and worldly story of our time. Displayed in the Gold Room, these cultural objects from the past, with the five cultural objects lent by the refugees for the one-year exhibition contain in their folds the stories of those personal encounters and adventures. The Gold Room was exhibited in the Swedish History Museum, Stockholm, Sweden, 2016-2017, in the Koffler, Toronto, Canada, 2017, in Wasserman Projects, Detroit, USA, 2019.
- Esther Shalev-Gerz, One-woman exhibition, 2016, Galleri Susanne Ottesen, Copenhagen, Denmark in collaboration with JSVCprojects. This exhibition, which is Esther Shalev-Gerz's first solo gallery exhibition in Scandinavia, is presenting five of her recent series of works spanning a decade between 2000 and 2010.
- Space Between Time, 2016, Wasserman Projects, Detroit, USA.
- The Last Click, 2016, one-woman exhibition, at Sprovieri Gallery in collaboration with JSVCprojects, London, UK.
- Inseparable Angels: An Imaginary House for Walter Benjamin, MAMCO, Geneva, Switzerland, 2016
- Dead Wood, exhibited in La Halle-Centre d'art, Pont-en-Royans, France, 2016
- Commissioned by the Helen and Morris Belkin Art Gallery, Vancouver, Canada, The Shadow, 2018, a 24,000 concrete pavers, 100x25m artwork embeds a ghostly silhouette of a first-growth Douglas fir across the expanse of University Commons Plaza, which is situated on the traditional, ancestral and unceded territory of the Musqueam people. Pixelated through the use of three differing shades of paving stones,The Shadow engages pedestrians through its varied texture and tone underfoot, yet does not reveal the entire form. As in the landscape, the totality of the tree can only be grasped from a distance: The Shadow requires a view from higher ground to be complete. Rather than extend forms into vertical space, The Shadow, like these earlier works, presents an absence as a hovering memory beneath our feet.
- In 2018, one-woman exhibition, The Koffler Gallery, Toronto, Canada. The Koffler Gallery presents Shalev-Gerz' first exhibition in Toronto, bringing together four video and photography installations that explore memory and migration. Developed through active dialogue with diverse communities, these projects foreground participants' individual and collective experiences.
- Esther Shalev-Gerz – The Factory is Outside, 2017-2018, Serlachius Museum, Mänttä, Finlande
- Between Listening and Telling, 2018, projection during the 11th Ceremony to the Memory of the Victims of the Holocaust, UNESCO, Paris, France, January 25th
- ON I OFF Muestra de Video, 2018, group exhibition, La Havana, Cuba.
- The Shadow, 2018, permanent installation in public space, University Plaza, UBC, Vancouver Canada
- Persona Grata, 2019, group-exhibition, Mac Val, Vitry-sur-Seine.
- love in the time of social media, 2019, group exhibition, Kunstraum Walcheturm, Zurich, Switzerland.
- Esther Shalev-Gerz: Selections from the Gold Room, 2019, one-woman exhibition, Wasserman Projects, Detroit, USA.
- Sortir, 2019, group exhibition, Cité scolaire Beaumont, Works from the FRAC Bretagne collection, Redon, France.
- Nicht Museum, 2020, group exhibition, Neumarkt, Dresden, Germany.
- Selection of works from Ritrovare Volterra, 1998 & Dead Wood, 2016, solo exhibition, 2020, POLPIS Capital, LLC, New York, USA, from July
- The Crown Letter, 2020, weekly from April 21st.
- Since 2020, Esther Shalev-Gerz has been part of a group that works on the creation of the future Memorial-Museum of Societies facing Terrorism, France, where she is the only artist among historians and colleagues. To this day, they have produced the report in English and French. Read the report here
- Reflecting Pool, 2020, winter group exhibition, Wasserman Projects, Detroit, USA.
- WEFRAC 2021, Road Trip: Quand les projets rhabillent le FRAC, 2021, group exhibition in the public space, FRAC Bretagne, France.
- La cité sous le ciel – 93 artistes, 2021, CNEAI, Cité internationale universitaire de Paris, France.
- The Crown Letter, 2021, Photo Days, Square de la Tour Saint-Jacques, Paris, and Jardin Villemin, Paris, France.
- IN VISIBLE, Philosophie et Art à l’UNESCO, 2021, celebrating the tenth anniversary of Les Nuits de la Philosophie organized by Mériam Korichi, UNESCO, Paris, France, September 17th – September 18th.
- The Crown Letter, Environmental Awareness – Chapter 4: The Crown Letter, 2021, Bienalsur, Centro Cultural Córdoba, Argentina.
- The Crown Letter, Bienalsur, 2021, MAPI Museo, Montevideo, Uruguay.
- Between Listening and Telling, 2021, Nuit Blanche, one-woman exhibition, Mémorial de la Shoah, Paris, France, October 2nd – October 3rd.
- The Last Click, 2021, one-woman exhibition, Out of Sight, curated by Dušica Dražic, Antwerp, Belgium.
- The Crown Letter, 2021, Photo Days, group exhibition, Fondation Fiminco, Romainville, France.
- Iconoclash, group exhibition, 2022, in connection with the collaborative project BEYOND MATTER: Cultural Heritage on the Verge of the Virtual Reality, Zentrum für Kunst und Medien Karlsruhe, Karlsruhe, Germany.
- The Crown Letter, 2022, group exhibition, as part of KG+, in connection with Kyotography, French Institute, Kyoto, Japan.
- Inseparable Angels. An Imaginary House for Walther Benjamin, 2022, one-woman exhibition, Bauhaus-Museum Weimar, Weimar, Germany.
- Metro Art Track, 2022, group exhibition, for the ‘Metro Art Programme’ in 2023, Shopping center, Dudley, England.
- IN VISIBLE, 2022, one-woman exhibition, Art Sorbonne Gallery, curated by Yann Toma and as part of Photo Days, Paris.

== Permanent installations in public space ==
- Oil on Stone, Tel Hai, Israel, 1983. A sculpture realized from a white Jerusalem stone slab cut into bricks and brought to the Tel Hai hill where it reassembled by the artist as two walls forming a 45° angle without touching each other, so that depending on the point of view one sees a silhouette pointing north or walls fallen into ruins.
- Monument Against Fascism, Hamburg, Germany, 1986. Developed with Jochen Gerz via an international competition organized by the city of Hamburg-Harburg, the "Monument against Fascism" (1986–93) was a social experiment with an uncertain outcome. In a public square, the two artists erected column clad in lead beside which they provided a metal pencil and a panel with the following text translated in seven languages (English, French, German, Russian, Turk, Arabic and Hebrew): "We invite the citizens of Harburg, and visitors to the town, to add their names here to ours. In doing so we commit ourselves to remain vigilant. As more and more names cover this 12 metre-high lead column, it will gradually be lowered into the ground. One day it will have disappeared completely and the site of the Harburg monument against fascism will be empty. In the long run, it is only we ourselves who can stand up against injustice." According to Jochen Gertz, "Either the monument 'works', that is, it is made superfluous by the public's own initiative, or it remains as a monument to its own failure, (as) the writing on the wall." Since 1993, when the last stage of the monument was sunk into the ground, only a one-square-metre lead plate, the cap of the column, has been visible, along with an information board. A photo sequence documents the process of its disappearance. The active participation and appropriation, which took a wide variety of forms, eventually led to the disappearance of the visible object over the years. It was covered with some 70,000 names, entries and graffiti (x loves y or "Foreigners Out!") and their strikeouts. Swastikas and even traces of gunshots were found in the lead coating. Jochen Gerz commented: "As a reflection of society, this monument is doubly challenging, in that it not only reminds society of things past, but also – and this is the most unsettling – of its own reaction to this past."
- The Dispersal of Seeds, The Collection of Ashes, UN Park, Geneva, Switzerland, 1995 and Marl, Germany, 1996. A commission by the German government to commemorate the 50 anniversary of the creation of the United nations in 1995. The two masts, reminiscent of the poles from which emblematic flags are flown, represent on the one hand the role of distribution to new beginnings and on the other hand the necessity to assemble histories.
- First Generation, 2004, Sweden. For this permanent installation, Shalev-Gerz filmed in extreme close-ups the face of each of the 34 people from the first generation of immigrants as she/he listens to her/his answers to the questions: when arriving here, what did you lose? What did you find? What did you get? What did you give? This silent film is visible on the glass façade of the Multicultural Center Botkyrka. One can here their voice by entering the building.
- A Thread, permanent installation, Castlemilk, south of Glasgow. From 2003 to 2006 Esther Shalev-Gerz developed a project in which ten groups of participants were invited to choose their favourite view in the former park of a castle near their new housing. At each point of view a circular bench was installed thus creating a path through the park.
- Les Inséparables, Wanas, Sweden. In 2008 Wanas Foundation commissioned a new version of the double-clock Angel 10, that is originally part of the installation Inseparable Angels: The Imaginary House for Walter Benjamin, 2000. This new 3-meter-wide (9.8 ft) double-clock is permanently installed in the park of the Foundation.
- Les Inséparables permanent installation, Lissignol street, Geneva, Switzerland. Double clock 2/3 with red second hands for the city of Geneva. In 2016, commission of a new version of the Inseparable Angels.
- The Shadow, 2018, 24000 three-shade concrete pavers, 100x25m in total commissioned by the Belkin art gallery, University of British Columbia

== Books, catalogues and monographs ==
- Esther Shalev-Gerz at The Koffler Gallery, The Koffler Centre of the Arts, Toronto, Canada, 2018
- Esther shalev-Gerz, The Shadow, Morris and Helen Belkin Gallery, UBC, Canada, 2018
- Esther Shalev-Gerz, The Factory is Outside, Serlachius Museum and Parvs, Finland, 2017
- Esther Shalev-Gerz, The Contemporary Art of Trusting Uncertainties and Unfolding Dialogues, Valand Academy, University of Gothenburg and Art and Theory Publishing, Sweden, 2013
- Esther Shalev-Gerz, The Belkin Art Gallery, UBC, Vancouver, Canada, 2013
- Esther Shalev-Gerz – Describing Labor, The Wolfsonian-FIU, Miami Beach, USA, 2012
- Esther Shalev-Gerz, MCBA/Lausanne and JRP|Ringier, Zurich, Switzerland, 2012
- Esther Shalev-Gerz, Kamloops Art Gallery, Kamloops, Canada, 2012
- Esther Shalev-Gerz, Der letzte Klick, Bulletin n°17, Museum für Photographie, Brunswick, Germany, 2010
- Esther Shalev-Gerz, Jeu de Paume and Fage Editions, France, 2010
- Still/Film, Vilnius Academy of Art, Lithuania, 2009
- The Place of Art, Art monitor, Göteborg University, Sweden, 2008
- A Thread, Aje Aje, in collaboration with CCA, Glasgow, U.K., 2008
- MenschenDinge, (The Human Aspect of Objects), Gedenkstätte Buchenwald, Germany, 2006
- First Generation, Multiculturel Center, Fitja, Sweden, 2006
- Die Berliner Ermittlung von Jochen Gerz und Esther Shalev-Gerz in Theater als Öffentlicher "Raum", Christel Weiler, "Spielen in Auschwitz", in Theater der Zeit, Germany, 2005
- Daedal(us), Fire Station Artists' Studios, Dublin, Ireland, 2005
- Två installationer/Two Installations, History Museum, Stockholm, Sweden, 2002
- Geht dein Bild mich an? / Does Your Image Reflect Me?, Sprengel-Museum, Hannover, Germany, 2002
- Les Portraits des Histoires – Aubervilliers, Editions ENSBA, France, 2000
- Les Portraits des Histoires – Belsunce, Editions Images en Manoeuvres, Marseille, France, 2000
- Die Berliner Ermittlung, Hebbel-Theater, Berlin, Germany, 1998 (with Jochen Gerz)
- Raisons de sourire, Actes Sud, Arles, France, 1997 (with J.G.)
- Irréparable, Musée de la Roche-sur-Yon, France, 1996
- Das 20. Jahrhundert, Klartext Verlag, Essen, Germany, 1996 (with J.G.)
- Mahnmal gegen Faschismus, Cantz/Hatje Verlag Stuttgart, Germany, 1993 (with J.G.)
- Erase the Past, DAAD, Berlin, Germany, 1991
- COPAN, Gallery Giovanna Minelli, Paris, France, 1990

== Works in public collections ==
- Fond Regional d'Art Contemporain de Bretagne (France)
- Skissernas Museum Lund (Sweden)
- Sprengel Museum Hannover (Germany)
- Mac/Val Vitry-sur-Seine (France)
- Kulturbehörde Hamburg (Germany)
- The National Public Art Council (Sweden)
- UNO Park Geneva (Switzerland)
- City of Marl (Germany)
- Wanas Foundation (Sweden)
- Collection d'art contemporain de la Ville de Marseille (France)
- Musée Henry Martin, Cahors (France)
- Musée Municipale de La Roche-sur-Yon (France)
- Manufacture des Gobelins, Paris (France)
- Buchenwald Memorial (Germany)
- Fondation Cartier (France)
- Environment Trust Glasgow (UK)
- Maison Européenne de la Photographie, Paris (France)
- Collection de la Fondation Hippocrene, Paris (France)
- Musée Cantonal des Beaux Arts/Lausanne (Switzerland)
- The Wolfsonian-FIU Miami Beach (USA)
- The Israel Museum Jerusalem (Israel)
- Fonds d'art contemporain de la Ville de Genève (Switzerland)
- The Hasselblad Foundation (Sweden)
- The Serlachius Museums (Finland)
- The Belkin Art Gallery (Canada)
- Centre national des arts plastiques, CNAP (France)
