= Revenge of the Musketeers (1994 film) =

- French theatrical release poster
- Directed by: Bertrand Tavernier
- Screenplay by: Michel Léviant; Bertrand Tavernier; Jean Cosmos
- Story by: Riccardo Freda; Eric Poindron
- Produced by: Frederic Bourboulon
- Starring: Sophie Marceau; Philippe Noiret; Claude Rich; Sami Frey
- Cinematography: Patrick Blossier
- Edited by: Ariane Boeglin
- Music by: Philippe Sarde
- Production companies: CiBy 2000; Little Bear; TF1 Films Production; Canal+
- Distributed by: BAC Films
- Release date: 24 August 1994 (France)
- Running time: 125 minutes
- Country: France
- Language: French
- Budget: $9.1 million
- Box office: $11.6 million

Revenge of the Musketeers (French: La fille de d'Artagnan) is a 1994 French swashbuckler adventure film directed by Bertrand Tavernier and starring Sophie Marceau, Philippe Noiret, Claude Rich, and Sami Frey. Set in the seventeenth century, the film is about the daughter of the renowned swordsman D'Artagnan who keeps the spirit of the Musketeers alive by bringing together the aging members of the legendary band to oppose a plot to overthrow the King and seize power. Revenge of the Musketeers was filmed on location at the Château de Biron in Biron, Dordogne and the Château de Maisons in Maisons-Laffitte in France and in Portugal with a budget of $9.1 million.

Revenge of the Musketeers was released in France on 24 August 1994, and received mixed reviews, with some reviewers applauding the film's production values, cinematography, and playful swashbuckler style and other reviewers complaining about the film's pacing. Sophie Marceau was singled out by one reviewer who felt she was "delightful in the lead, demonstrating a playful coquettishness and a mastery of the blade." Marceau did her own fencing on screen. The film went on to earn $11.6 million. In 1995, the film received César Award nominations for Best Music Written for a Film (Philippe Sarde) and Best Supporting Actor (Claude Rich).

== Plot ==
In the autumn of 1654, an escaped slave is given refuge at a convent in Southern France. His pursuers break into the convent, and after wounding the mother superior, they close in on their prey. One feisty novice, Eloise (Sophie Marceau)—the daughter of the renowned swordsman D'Artagnan (Philippe Noiret) of the famed Three Musketeers—stands up to the intruders, but is shoved aside as they ride off after the frightened slave who escaped from the evil Duke Crassac de Merindol. Eloise finds a blood-stained piece of paper (a simple laundry list) that the slave used to stop a bleeding wound, and believes it holds some secret code. When the mother superior dies, Eloise swears a sacred oath to avenge her. Dressed in men's clothes, Eloise sets out for Paris to elicit the help of her father in tracking down the murderers.

At a roadside tavern, Eloise gets into a sword fight and is helped by a young poet, Quentin la Misère (Nils Tavernier), who writes her a brief love poem, "Dance, butterfly, dance". Attracted to Eloise, he accompanies her to Paris where she is reunited with her famous father, whom she hasn't seen since childhood. When she shows him the blood-stained paper she believes holds the key to a secret plot, he tells her it looks like a laundry list with blood on it. Later, D'Artagnan visits the grave of his former Musketeer, Athos, and longs for the days when the Musketeers were together, defending their King. Meanwhile, Eloise heads to the royal court, where she meets Cardinal Mazarin (Gigi Proietti) who is teaching the youthful King Louis XIV (Stéphane Legros) the subtleties of deceitful diplomacy. When Eloise learns that Mazarin plans to arrest Quentin, she rushes off. Mazarin, who believes she has evidence of his conspiracies, orders the one-eyed man to follow her. The King's men track her down through the narrow streets of Paris, where her father comes to her rescue, and the two defeat several men in a daring sword fight.

With Eloise and Quentin in tow, D'Artagnan reunites with two of his former musketeers—Porthos and Aramis—whom he enlists to help thwart an as yet unidentified conspiracy against the King. Convinced the list contains a secret code, the pedantic Aramis helps decipher the list, using advanced linguistic and Biblical knowledge. Meanwhile, the Duke of Crassac (Claude Rich)—a slave trader and smuggler—is indeed plotting against the King, planning to poison him at the upcoming coronation, blame Mazarin, and when the King's younger brother is installed, step in as the powerful King's protector. Crassac's mistress, Eglantine de Rochefort—the "woman in red" who witnessed the convent murder—tasks him to kill all involved in the convent incident and leave no witnesses.

D'Artagnan, Porthos, Aramis, Eloise, and Quentin ride to the convent, where they hope to learn more about the conspiracy. Eloise finds the body of a dead nun before encountering Eglantine in the process of destroying all evidence of her existence from the convent's records. Eloise is captured by Eglantine's accomplice and taken to Crassac's castle dock where she joins the nuns who are being sold and shipped to the Americas as slaves. When Crassac arrives and spots Eloise, he decides to take her for himself back to his castle. When D'Artagnan and his companions arrive, the aging musketeers slowly scale the castle walls, helped by the one-eyed man, who turns out to be the fourth Musketeer, Athos, thought to have died years before. The Musketeers ride to the nuns' rescue, killing scores of smugglers and freeing the sisters. After the fight, the musketeers ride off to Paris, where the King is preparing for his coronation.

In Paris, D'Artagnan enters the palace and warns the young King about the plot against his life. Meanwhile, Crassac and his followers gather and plan the next day's coronation murder. While Crassac shares his delusional plans to marry Eloise, she suddenly appears—freed by the jealous Eglantine—and in the ensuing sword fight, just as Eloise is about to be killed by three of Crassac's men, D'Artagnan and his men come to her rescue. During the ensuing battle, Eloise chases after the fleeing Crassac and engages him in an extended sword fight that leads them to the roof of the palace. Just as Crassac is about to kill Eloise, D'Artagnan arrives and runs the evil Duke through with a sword, ending the threat to his daughter and to his King. Afterwards, D'Artagnan tells his daughter how proud he is of her and the two embrace.

== Cast ==
- Sophie Marceau as Eloïse d'Artagnan
- Philippe Noiret as D'Artagnan
- Claude Rich as Duke of Crassac
- Sami Frey as Aramis
- Jean-Luc Bideau as Athos
- Raoul Billerey as Porthos
- Charlotte Kady as Eglantine de Rochefort
- Nils Tavernier as Quentin la Misère
- Gigi Proietti as Cardinal Mazarin
- Jean-Paul Roussillon as Planchet
- Pascale Roberts as Mother Superior
- Fabienne Chaudat as Sister Frédégonde
- Emmanuelle Bataille as Sister Félicité
- Christine Pignet as Sister Céline
- Josselin Siassia as Slave
- Jean-Claude Calon as Slave Trader
- Stéphane Legros as Louis XIV
- Maria Pitarresi as Olympe
- Jean Martinez as Duke of Longueville
- Patrick Rocca as Bargas
- Michel Alexandre as The Halberdier
- Fanny Aubert as Sister Huguette
- François Levantal as Courtier
- Grégoire Barachin as Fencing Pupil #1
- Jean-Pierre Bouchard as Conspirator
- Daniel Breton as Recruiting Sergeant
- Canto e Castro as Principal Singing Monk
- Carlos César as Innkeeper
- Vanina Delannoy as Courtesan #1
- Raymond Faucher as Painter
- Filipe Ferrer as Conti

== Production ==
The original director of the film was Riccardo Freda, but he was replaced by Bertrand Tavernier a few days after shooting started. Freda directed Il Figlio de D'Artagnan (The Gay Swordsman) in 1949, and was not pleased with the result. Freda had given Bertrand Tavernier his first production assignments. Following the success of Cyrano de Bergerac in 1990, the Paris production house Ciby 2000 agreed to have Freda direct a film about D'Artagnan's daughter—a project that Freda and Eric Poindron conceived—with Tavernier serving as producer. Principal photography started in October 1993, and from the first days of shooting, the film ran into serious difficulty. Freda had little regard for actors, and Sophie Marceau soon became frustrated with the eighty-four year old director, threatening to leave the project if Freda was not replaced. Tavernier took over as director, causing some tension between himself and his former mentor. While Tavernier's films always utilized comedic elements, La Fille de D'Artagnan was his first and only straight comedy.

Tavernier kept the film true to its genre, adding many of the expected components, including the innocent and rebellious heroine, scheming nobles, lengthy sword-fights, spectacular horseback escapes, and subplots involving romance and conspiracies. At several points throughout the film, the director adds good-natured parody to the mix, as when Aramis witnesses the cavaliers heroically leaping on horseback from the quay to the ship, wryly notes, "Heroic, but absurd ..."

Revenge of the Musketeers was filmed on location at the Château de Biron in Biron, Dordogne in southwestern France, the Château de Maisons in Maisons-Laffitte in the northwestern suburbs of Paris, and in Portugal. Sophie Marceau did her own fencing on screen.

== Release ==
Revenge of the Musketeers was released in France on 24 August 1994.

== Reception ==
=== Critical response ===
Revenge of the Musketeers received mixed reviews. The AllMovie website gave the film two out of five stars. In his review on AV Club website, Keith Phipps wrote, "Tavernier's assured direction and a game performance from Marceau make it worth a look." Le Film Guide's James Travers felt that despite the admirable production values and excellent cinematography, "the film never really seems to get going". Travers concluded that "the best thing about the film is its wry, self-deprecating humour". The Flickering Myth website praised the film's solid entertaining qualities:

D'Artagnan's Daughter is precisely the kind of fun and feisty swashbuckler French cinema excels at. Tavernier throws conspiracy, duels to the death and father-daughter tensions into an adventure film and still keeps the tone indomitably light-hearted. This is quintessential Saturday night entertainment; it just happens to be in French."

Total Film magazine gave the film a rating of one star, noting that the 1997 French film Le Bossu was a "more confident affair that bolsters playfulness with purpose". The Stumped website focused on Marceau's performance, writing, "Marceau is delightful in the lead, demonstrating a playful coquettishness and a mastery of the blade."

=== Accolades ===
Award	Category	Nominee	Result	Ref
César Award	Best Supporting Actor	Claude Rich	Nominated	
César Award	Best Music Written for a Film	Philippe Sarde	Nominated	
