= Venus of Monpazier =

Prehistoric artifact

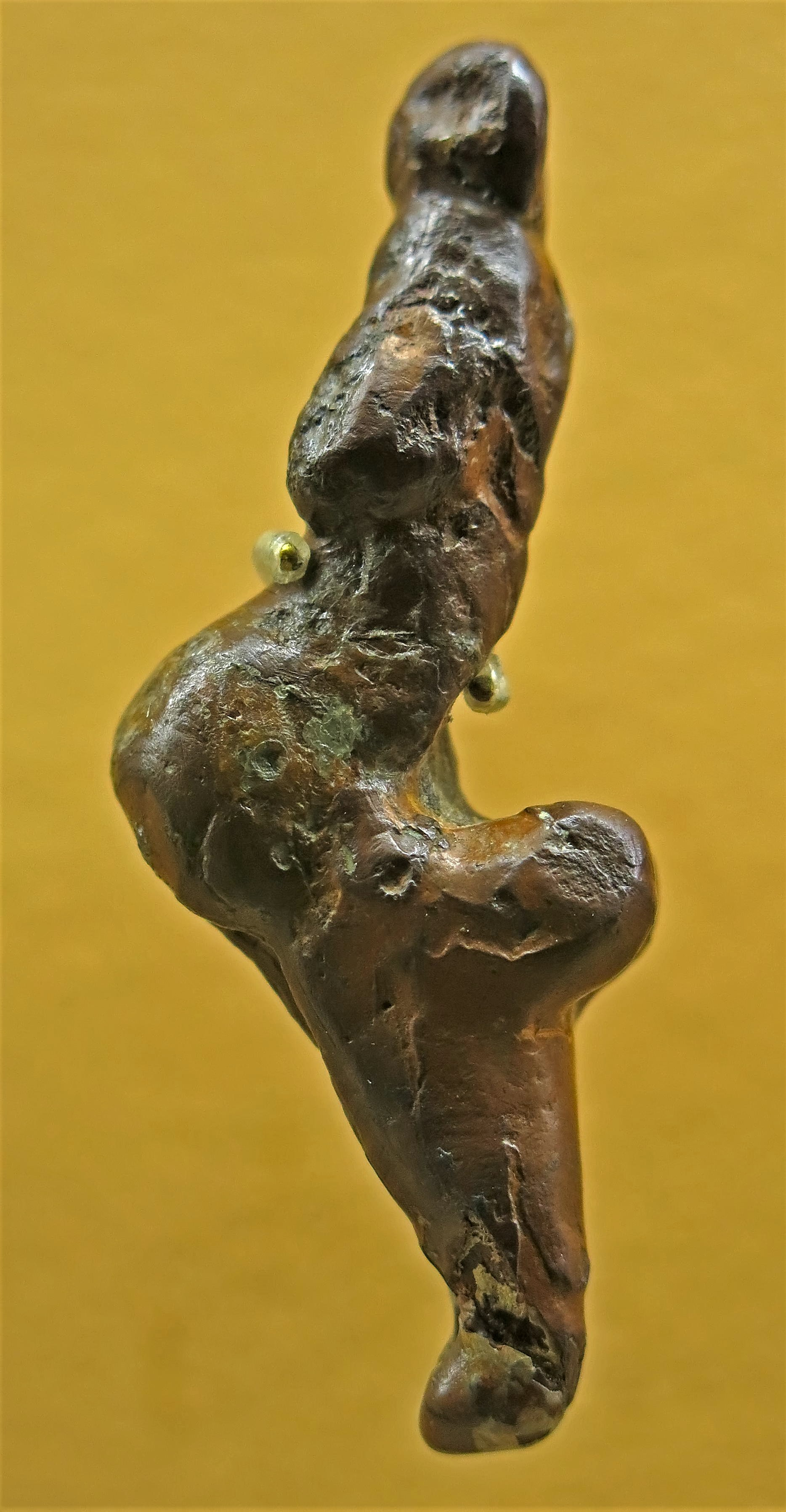
- Figurine on display in the French National Museum of Prehistory
- Material: Limonite
- Size: Height: 4.7 cm
- Created: 25,000 years
- Discovered: April 1970; Monpazier, Dordogne, France
- Discovered by: Monsieur Cerou
- Present location: Les Eyzies-de-Tayac-Sireuil, Dordogne, France

The Monpazier Venus, also known as the "Vénus de Monpazier," is a small, prehistoric figurine of a female form that was discovered in Monpazier, a medieval town in the Dordogne region of southwestern France. It was found accidentally in 1970 outside of its archaeological context. However, it has been dated by comparison with other female figures found in Europe. This figurine is an example of Paleolithic art, specifically from the Gravettian period, which is estimated to have occurred around 22,000 to 28,000 years ago.

== Description ==
The Monpazier Venus is carved out of limonite, a local rock, and is about 4.7 centimeters (1.85 inches) in height. It is carved in the shape of a woman with pronounced hips, vulva and breasts. The figurine is notable for its fine craftsmanship and the attention to detail in representing the female form. Many Paleolithic figurines like this one are believed to be representations of fertility or perhaps served as religious or shamanic objects, though their exact purpose is still the subject of debate among archaeologists and anthropologists.

The figure was discovered in a ploughed field by Monsieur Elisée Cerou, a jeweler from Monpazier, in April 1970. Later that same year, a group of visitors who visited his shop spotted the piece of rock art and recognized its importance.

This small figurine is significant because it provides insights into the artistic and symbolic expressions of prehistoric people, helping us understand more about the culture and beliefs of humans in Europe during the Gravettian period.

The Monpazier Venus is now part of the prehistoric art collection at the Musée National de Préhistoire (National Museum of Prehistory) in Les Eyzies-de-Tayac-Sireuil, France.
