= Jochen Gerz =

German textual, conceptual and public artist

- Born: April 4, 1940 (age 86); Germany
- Known for: Conceptual art, counter-monuments, public authorship
- Movement: Conceptual art, Visual poetry
- Awards: Ordre National du Mérite (1996); Grand Prix National des Arts Plastiques (1998); Prix Evens (2002)

Jochen Gerz (born 4 April 1940) is a German conceptual artist who lived in France from 1966 to 2007. His work involves the relationship between art and life, history and memory, and deals with concepts such as culture, society, public space, participation and public authorship. After beginning his career in the literary field, Gerz has in the meantime explored various artistic disciplines and diverse media. Whether he works with text, photography, video, artist books, installation, performance, or on public authorship pieces and processes, at the heart of Gerz's practice is the search for an art form that can contribute to the res publica and to democracy. Gerz lives in Sneem, County Kerry, Ireland, since 2007.

== Career ==
An autodidact, Jochen Gerz began his career in literature and later transitioned to art. He began writing and translating in the early 1960s (Ezra Pound, Richard Aldington), while occasionally working as a foreign correspondent for a German news agency in London (1961–62). He studied German language and literature, English language and literature and Sinology in Cologne, and then later archaeology and prehistory in Basel (1962–66). After moving to Paris, he became part of the Visual Poetry movement.

As an activist and witness to the May 1968 demonstrations in Paris, Gerz took full advantage of the newfound freedom from literary and artistic conventions. He thus began in the late 1960s to engage critically with the media, both commercial and artistic, and increasingly came to see the viewer, the public and society at large as all part of the creative process. His photo/texts, performances, installations and works in the public space call into question the social function of art and the Western cultural legacy after Auschwitz. Doubts about art continually resurface and still pervade his work today.

Jochen Gerz gained international recognition with his contribution to the 37th Venice Biennale in 1976, where his works were featured in the German Pavilion alongside those of Joseph Beuys and Reiner Ruthenbeck, as well as with his participation in documenta 6 and 8 in Kassel (1977/1987). There followed numerous retrospectives of his work in Europe and North America (including at the Hamburger Kunsthalle, Centre Pompidou Paris, Corner House Manchester, Vancouver Art Gallery, Newport Harbor Art Museum and Neuberger Art Museum N.Y.). In 1979, Gerz participated in the Biennale of Sydney, and in 1980 in the ROSC exhibition in Dublin. From the mid-1980s onward, he once again turned his attention more toward the public realm and in the 1990s increasingly withdrew from the world of the art market and museums.

Gerz has realised several (counter-)monuments since 1986 which at once engage with and subvert the tradition of remembrance, the public becoming the creative vortex of his work. His public authorship projects and participatory processes in the public sphere since 2000 manage to radically transform the relationship between art and viewer.

From 1970 onwards, Jochen Gerz lectured at art schools and universities in Australia, Austria, Canada, Croatia, Denmark, France, Germany, Great Britain, Hungary, Israel, Ireland, Japan, The Netherlands, Portugal, Serbia, Switzerland and the United States.

== Writing ==
The practice of writing and the question: "What does it mean to write?" form a leitmotif that can be traced throughout Gerz's oeuvre. He casts doubt on the capabilities of language, experiments with its representative function, and breaks with conventional discursive linearity.

In 1968, Gerz and Jean-François Bory founded the alternative publishing house "Agentzia", which published early works by artists (Maurizio Nannucci, A.R. Penck, Franco Vaccari, Manfred Mohr and others) and by authors of "Visual Poetry". He described his own work at the time as "away-from-paper texts, toward-squares-streets-houses-people texts, and back-to-paper-again texts. They nest in the book like parasites. They take place anywhere, anytime." These words anticipate Gerz's path to text as part of visual art and to art as a critical, participatory contribution to the public space and to society.

Although Gerz's texts are conceived as part of his artworks, they are also highly acclaimed on their own merits. "The most extensive and richest of these books", writes Petra Kipphoff of "The Centaur's Difficulty When Dismounting the Horse", created in parallel with the installation at the 1976 Venice Biennale, "is on the one hand a reflection and a reckoning and on the other a collection of aphorisms that with its intricately ramified phrases is unrivalled in contemporary literature."

== Early works in public space ==
Jochen Gerz began to discover the public space for his work around 1968, using artworks to confront the realities of daily life. In a 1972 interview he refers to himself not as a writer or an artist but as "one who publishes himself".

=== Caution Art Corrupts (1968) ===
In 1968, Gerz pasted a small sticker with the words "Caution Art Corrupts" on Michelangelo's "David" in Florence (Attenzione l’Arte Corrompe). He thus "laid the cornerstone for creative activities which consciously attempt to stand apart from categories, and which dare to formulate interventions that respect no strict separation of genres. Caution Art Corrupts is a work that addresses art while also extending beyond it: a single sentence, a single gesture, which makes it clear that the conditions for art after 1968 can no longer be retrieved from art alone."

=== Exhibition of 8 persons residing on Rue Mouffetard... ===
Many of Gerz's works in the late 1960s and during the 1970s deal with the nature of "public" versus "private" as the supposed locus of authenticity, such as 1972's Exhibition of 8 persons residing on Rue Mouffetard in Paris through their names written on the walls of their own street (Exposition de 8 personnes habitant la rue Mouffetard, à travers leurs noms, sur le murs de leur rue même). In collaboration with students from the École Nationale Supérieure des Arts Décoratifs, Gerz hung posters with the names of eight randomly chosen residents of Rue Mouffetard in Paris on their street in 1972. The diverse reactions, ranging from appreciation to people removing the poster with their name on it, can likely be attributed to how exhibiting a personal name in this way was tantamount to putting on display the "temple of the non-public realm".

=== Exhibition of Jochen Gerz next to his photographic reproduction (1972) ===
In 1972, Gerz stood on a street in the centre of Basel for two hours next to a photograph of himself. According to Andreas Vowinckel, this performance "was particularly effective in revealing the process of observation as demonstrated by chance passers-by in the street. They gave the photograph more of their attention and seemed to believe it more than they did Gerz's physical presence. This behaviour suggests that we are always looking for the secret behind reality", while also showing how distraction is the essential function of the waves of media that inundate us every day. The reproduction crowds out the original.

== Image and text ==
In the mid-1960s, Jochen Gerz began to delve into the dialectic between image and text. While in visual poetry the two "unequal siblings" still enjoyed a "playful interaction", in Gerz's "photo/texts" since 1969 they are subjected to an almost systematic questioning. Gerz works in the intermediate space between media, creating a poetic no man's land between fiction and reality that the viewer or reader must himself fill with (his own) life. Gerz's "mixed-media photography" works of the 1980s and 90s reveal by contrast continually new appropriations and connections between text and image, anticipating later technological developments and the possibilities of digital media – for converging and even fusing image and text – that are second nature for us today.

=== Photo/text ===
Gerz doesn't set out with his camera on a quest for exclusive or rare motifs; his photos seem instead to be rather random and commonplace. "From the way he makes use of the medium," says Herbert Molderings, "it is already clear that this work is not about adding new and aesthetically different, balanced and symbolically dense photos to the world's existing reservoir of reproductions, but rather that we are being asked here to consider the activity of photography itself and its place in our everyday cultural behaviour." The ordinary-looking, seemingly randomly shot photographs are placed next to texts that "relate" to one another in an indeterminate manner that is oddly bereft of context, not even revealing the nature of this relation upon closer inspection. The texts do not function as captions describing, augmenting or explaining the pictures, and nor do the photos illustrate the text. The photo/texts illustrate how the themes of memory, time, the past and history are not only the subject of "commemorative works" such as Gerz's later memorial projects (anti-monuments), but are present on many levels in his work.

=== Mixed-media photography ===
Gerz realised numerous mixed-media photographic works using montage and cross-fading, with image and text overlapping, interpenetrating and entering into complex pictorial relationships. The media engage with each other (and converge) here as image and information elements to such an extent that they seem to forfeit any signification of their own and can be identified only as part of the viewer's own memory. Like many of Gerz's other works, these too explore how experiences and memories are culturally conditioned. How extreme this alienation can be in some cases is demonstrated by "It Was Easy #3" (1988), one of ten wall-based works, which shows two bands of clouds, one mirrored as the negative of the other. Placed vertically, these cloud bands become ascending columns of smoke. Two text banners read: "It was easy to make laws for people" und "It was easy to make soap out of bones."

== Performance ==
Performative aspects can be found everywhere in Jochen Gerz's works – from his early writing and first participatory works in public space in the 1960s, to his photo/texts, mixed-media photography and installations, and onward to the public authorship pieces he has undertaken since the 1990s. This applies especially of course to his performances with or without an audience, whether in the exhibition space at galleries or museums, or outdoors in public space.

=== To Call until Exhaustion (1972) ===
In 1972, on the construction site of the future Charles de Gaulle Airport, Gerz shouted towards the camera and microphone from a distance of 60 metres until his voice failed, with Rufen bis zur Erschöpfung. This performance without an audience is documented in an 18-minute video that shows the process in real time. It shows a duel between the artist (the "original") and the mechanism of media reproduction, the machine ultimately gaining the upper hand.

=== Prometheus (1975) ===
The media-critical aspect is also present in "Prometheus" (1975), one of Gerz's "Greek Pieces", which confront with a dose of (self-)irony the European culture of representation. Using a mirror, the artist directs the sun's rays toward the lens of a video camera that is filming him. The overexposure gradually deletes the recorded image. "Blinding the medium with light," writes Gerz of this performance, and also: "P. ... is the man who resists being reproduced (...). "

=== Purple Cross for Absent Now (1979) ===
At the Centre d’Art Contemporain in Geneva in 1979, two video cameras with monitors were installed, along with an elastic rope that divided the room into two halves. The sight lines of two monitors, together with that of the cord, formed a cross shape. One end of the stretched rope was attached to the wall and the other penetrated the opposite wall into the next room, where it was, invisible to the audience, slung around the artist's neck. If anyone touched the rope, this resulted in a (painful) tug on the artist's neck, an effect that could be seen on the monitors. The performance played out as an "act of growing awareness in which the audience can comprehend what it means to watch, to participate in the action and to bear responsibility for what happens". On several occasions, the performance was aborted when those present or the organisers cut the rope. The work takes aim at the "anaesthetising effect of the media and the resulting over-emphasis on the world of representation, which takes on an autonomy that swallows up reality".

== Installations ==
In the 1970s and 80s, Gerz created many installations for European as well as North American and Australian museums and public galleries that deal with the museum context itself. Among them was the series of ten "Greek Pieces" (1975–78), which allude to the over-exposure of humanism to Greek mythology, whereas the series of nine "Kulchur Pieces" that followed (after Ezra Pound's "On Kulchur") from 1978 to 1984 satirise the "multinational" nature of Western culture (colonialism).

=== EXIT – Materials for the Dachau Project (1972/74) ===
The 1972/4 installation "EXIT – Materials for the Dachau Project" (Materialien zum Dachau-Projekt), consists of two rows of tables and chairs illuminated by weak light bulbs. We hear a runner breathing, the rattling of electric typewriters, and at intervals the sound of a camera shutter. On each table lies a copy of the same ring binder holding 50 photographs taken during a visit to the former Dachau concentration camp and documenting the language used in the museum. The compendium of instruction panels, guideposts and warning signs traces the emotional and mental circuit the visitor to the memorial must traverse, exposing the unavoidable continuity in language between concentration camp and museum.

"If today for convenience's sake the museum keyword ‘Exit’ hangs over doors that once led directly to a certain death," says Gottfried Knapp, "then the thoughtless analogy with reference systems, distorted through this discrepancy, takes on a macabre dimension." Controversial entries in the guestbooks of the Badischer Kunstverein in Karlsruhe and the Lenbachhaus in Munich attest to viewers’ intense and uneasy reactions to "EXIT" in the 1970s.

=== Live/Life (Leben, 1974) ===
In 1974 Jochen Gerz wrote the word "leben" (to live) with chalk for seven hours, filling the floor of the exhibition space (Art Museum Bochum). Anyone wanting to decipher the text installed on the front wall, had to cross the space and thereby tread on the writing on the floor, which was gradually blurred and deleted by the visitors’ steps. In order to view the work as a whole, the audience had to destroy it. When the work was realised again at the New York Guggenheim Museum SoHo in 1998, Marc Bormand explained in the exhibition catalogue: "The medium of chalk means that the erasure of the writing is already inherent and everlastingness is entirely absent."

=== The Centaur's Difficulty when dismounting the Horse (1976) ===
One of Jochen Gerz's most important installations, Die Schwierigkeit des Zentaurs beim vom Pferd steigen, was featured at the 37th Venice Biennale alongside Joseph Beuys and Reiner Ruthenbeck in the German Pavillon. The nine-metre-high and seven-metre-long Centaur, a wood structure covered in opaque photographic paint, was divided by a wall between two spaces. The larger section had a flap near the floor through which the artist could enter the sculpture, where he spent several days. The eponymous original manuscript on the work, in mirror writing, was displayed on six desks.

=== The Trans-Sib. Prospect (1977) ===
Gerz's work for documenta 6, Der Transsib.-Prospekt, likewise consisted of a performance without an audience. During the 16-day journey from Moscow to Kabarovsk and back on the Trans-Siberian Railway, the train window remained shuttered, so that nothing outside could be seen from the compartment. Gerz took along a slate (60 x 60 cm) for every day of the trip, on which he rested his feet. All other evidence of the journey was destroyed. At the 1977 documenta in Kassel, a room was set up with 16 chairs, before each of them a slate with his footprints. "Lived time cannot be exhibited". Whether the trip actually took place or the concept led directly to the installation remains an open question for the viewer. This work aims at reaching the limits of conceptual art.

=== News to News (Ashes to Ashes) (1995) ===
Upon entering the darkened room, the gaze falls on a black "picture", which, surrounded by a vibrating light, appears to float in front of the wall. The image is made up of 16 monitors arranged as a compact rectangular block at a distance of 30 centimetres from the wall – the screens facing the wall. A crackling sound is audible, automatically suggesting fire and a threat. Those who venture a peek behind the tableau will note that the monitors show 16 lighted fireplaces. The banality of this domestic idyll comes as a disappointment, contrasting sharply with the spectacle of fascination and horror generated by the concealment of the reality.

== (Counter-)monuments, collaborations and public authorship pieces ==
Jochen Gerz became known to audiences beyond the art world by way of his public pieces, created with the help of participants and, indeed, made possible by their contribution. Since 1986 he has realised numerous public authorship pieces, including several unusual (disappearing and invisible) memorials in urban contexts, also referred to as "counter-monuments" or anti-monuments. These memorial works reject their surrogate function. They hand the duty of memorialising back to the public, consuming themselves through their own temporality and then disappearing, only to reappear within the apparent paradox of an "invisible monument".

=== Monument against Fascism, Hamburg-Harburg (1986–93) ===
Developed with Esther Shalev-Gerz via an international competition organized by the city of Hamburg-Harburg, the "Monument against Fascism" (a Jochen Gerz and Esther Shalev-Gerz collaboration) was a social experiment with an uncertain outcome. In a public square, the two artists erected column clad in lead beside which they provided a metal pencil and a panel with the following text translated in seven languages (English, French, German, Russian, Turk, Arabic and Hebrew): "We invite the citizens of Harburg, and visitors to the town, to add their names here to ours. In doing so we commit ourselves to remain vigilant. As more and more names cover this 12 metre-high lead column, it will gradually be lowered into the ground. One day it will have disappeared completely and the site of the Harburg monument against fascism will be empty. In the long run, it is only we ourselves who can stand up against injustice."

According to Jochen Gerz, "Either the monument ‘works’, that is, it is made superfluous by the public's own initiative, or it remains as a monument to its own failure, (as) the writing on the wall."

Since 1993, when the last stage of the monument was sunk into the ground, only a one-square-metre lead plate, the cap of the column, has been visible, along with an information board. A photo sequence documents the process of its disappearance. The active participation and appropriation, which took a wide variety of forms, eventually led to the disappearance of the visible object over the years. It was covered with some 70,000 names, entries and graffiti (x loves y or "Foreigners Out!") and their strikeouts. Swastikas and even traces of gunshots were found in the lead coating. Jochen Gerz commented: "People, not monuments, are the places of memory." Elsewhere, he noted: "As a reflection of society, this monument is doubly challenging, in that it not only reminds society of things past, but also – and this is the most unsettling – of its own reaction to this past."

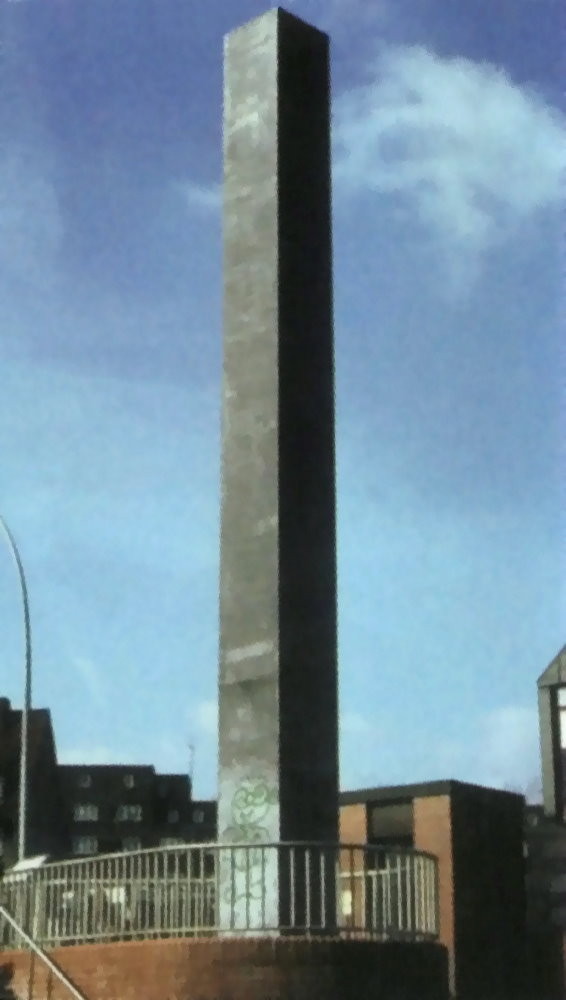
Mahnmal gegen Faschismus, Krieg, Gewalt, für Frieden und Menschenrechte - Harburg 1986

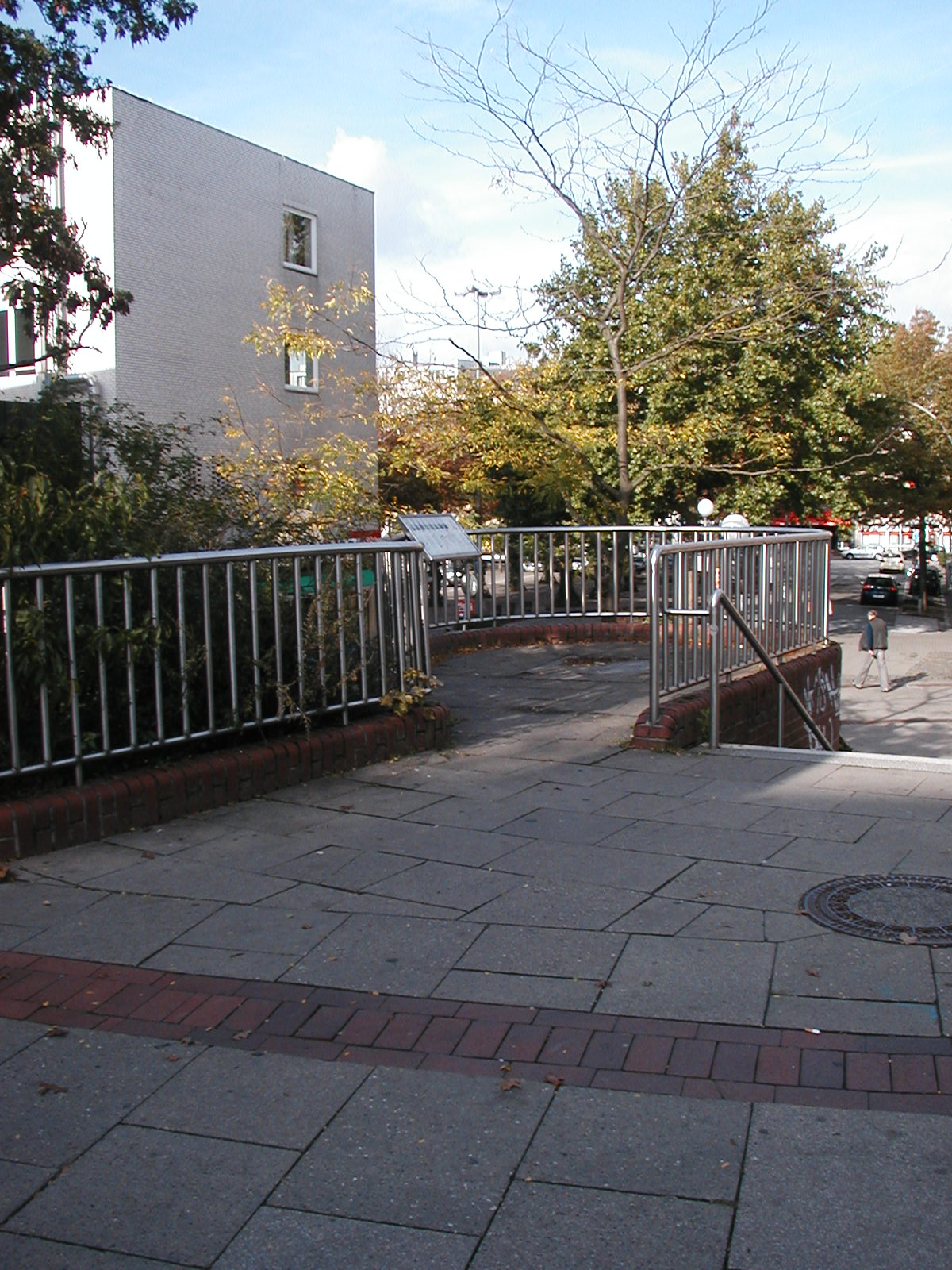

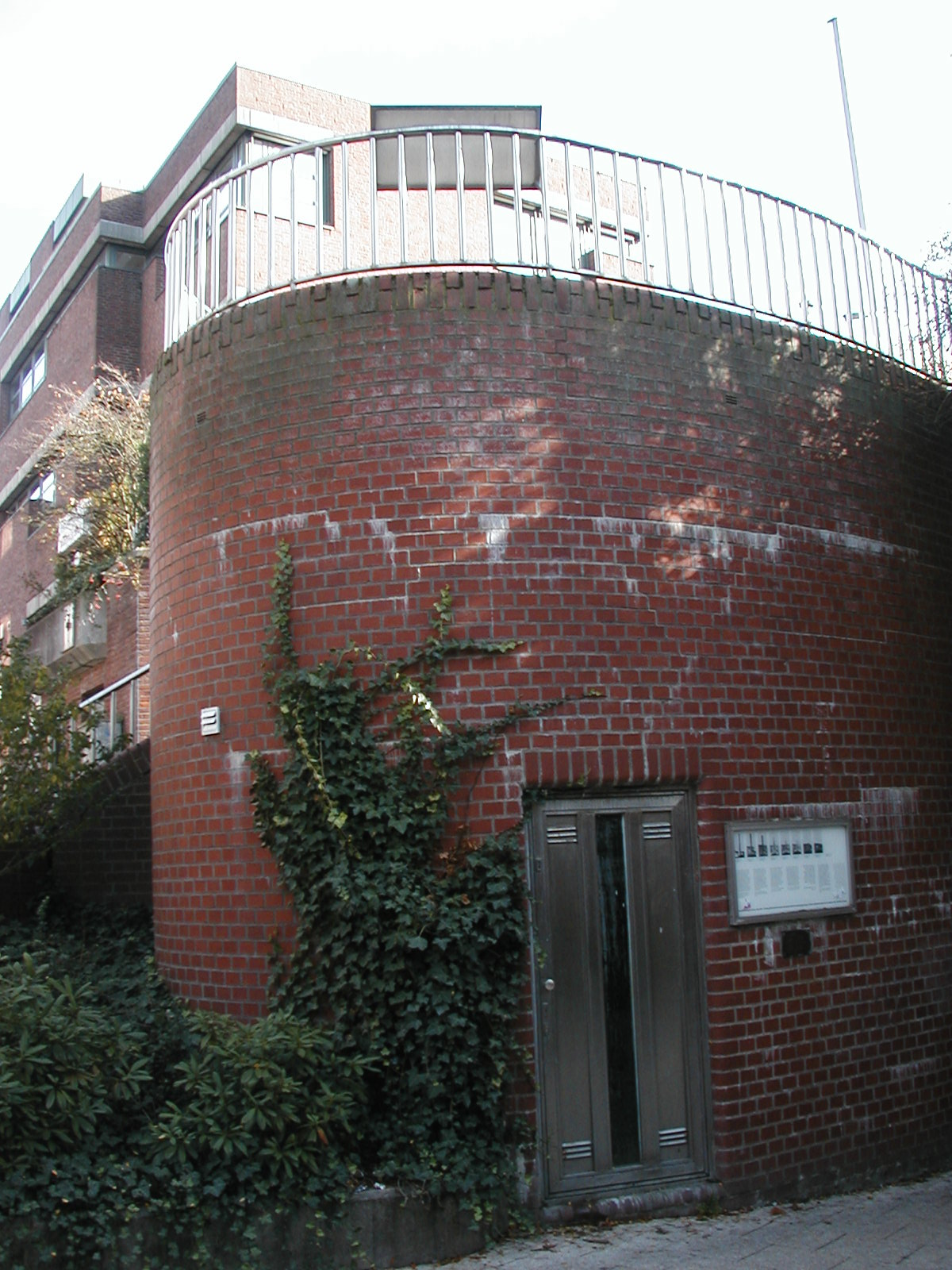

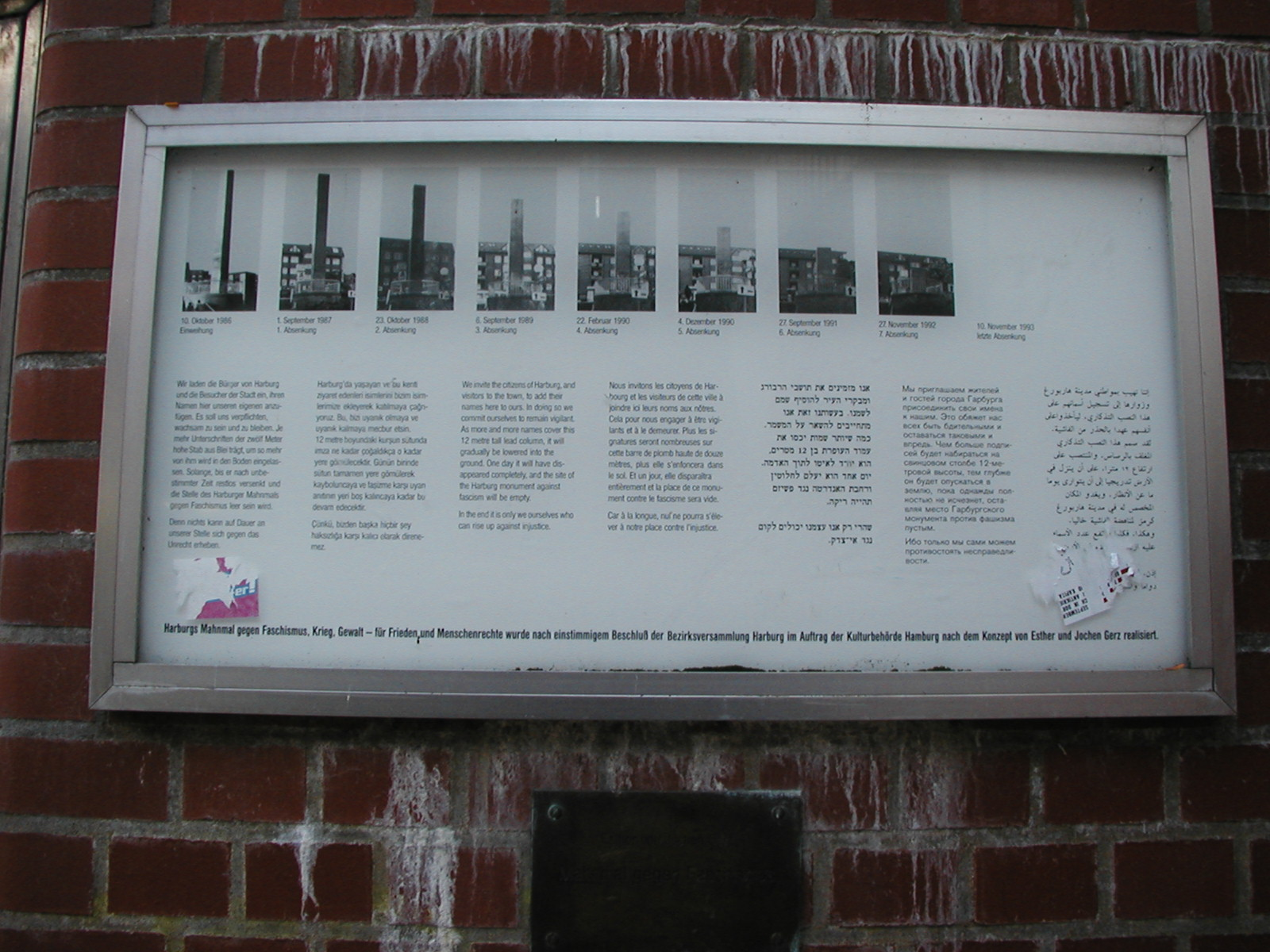

=== 2146 Stones – Monument against Racism, Saarbrücken (1993) ===
Starting in April 1990, all 66 Jewish communities in both German States were invited to contribute to a monument by providing the names of the Jewish cemeteries where burials had been performed until 1933. Together with a group of students from the Art Academy of Saarbrücken, Gerz removed during the night cobblestones from the promenade leading to the Saarbrücken castle, seat of the regional parliament and former regional Nazi administration. They replaced the stones in the alley while engraving the names of the Jewish cemeteries into the removed stones before returning them to where they had been taken from. However, the stones were placed with the inscription facing down, so that the square remained unchanged and the monument invisible. The complete number of cemeteries contributed by the Jewish communities had grown two years later to 2146. Like the monument in Hamburg-Harburg, the Saarbrücken monument is not visible, but must be realised by each person's own imagination. Unlike the Harburg monument, however, this one was not created as a commissioned work but rather as an originally secret and illegal initiative that was only retroactively legalised by the regional parliament. The Saarbrücken Castle Square is now called the "Square of the Invisible Monument".

=== The Living Monument of Biron ===
The Living Monument of Biron (1996) was based on a commission from the French Ministry of Culture. The commission was unusual: a German artist was chosen to "replace" the memorial for those who had been killed in the First and Second World Wars in the Dordogne village of Biron, where the 1944 massacre by the SS was still far from forgotten. Jochen Gerz renewed the Obelisk and the plaques with the names of the fallen, and asked every villager the same question, which they were asked not to reveal. The 127 anonymous replies were enamelled onto brass plaques and affixed to the new obelisk. Two examples:

"Life makes sense. To kill or give one's life is the same; it doesn't make sense today or yesterday. Life is everything: pleasure, joy, duty. We mustn't put it in danger. But I understand that people who knew the war don't see it the same way. However, I think that I wouldn't change my mind. It doesn't bother me at all to know that others here know what I think."

"War is not beautiful. It destroys the poor people. Peace doesn't last long; wars have always existed, they can start again at any time: the front, death, the restrictions. I don't know what we can do for peace. You need the whole world to agree to it. When you are twenty you want to live, and when you go to the front, you go to the slaughter. The worst part is that it pays. Making money with the lives of others, it's really sad!"

Even after the inauguration, the number of plaques on the "living monument" continue to grow. New and young villagers answer the "secret question" and carry on the village's dialogue with its present and its past.

=== The Berkeley Oracle – Questions Unanswered (1997) ===
"The Berkeley Oracle" is a tribute to the 1968 student movement that spread from the University of Berkeley campus to many European cities. Many of the values held during that time have long since become today's status quo. The spirit of awakening, however, has dissipated. In 1997 the following invitation was published online on a website shared by the Berkeley Art Museum and the ZKM Center for Art and Media in Karlsruhe: "In a homage to times of questioning and change, you are invited to contribute to The Berkeley Oracle your urgent, unforgotten, new or never-asked questions." As early as the beginning of the 1970s, Jochen Gerz had begun to grapple with the cultural technique of the computer ("These Words are My Flesh & My Blood", 1971), and in the 1990s he increasingly made use of the possibilities offered by digital communication (e.g. "The Plural Sculpture", 1995; "The Anthology of Art", 2001). "The Berkeley Oracle" is an allusion to the Oracle at Delphi. Is the World Wide Web the new oracle?

"By neither promising nor delivering answers, The Berkeley Oracle steps out of politics and into philosophy, into art. Gerz invites the participants into a space of questioning and simply leaves them there. It is a space that Pyrrho of Ellis called ‘epoché’, a state of mental suspension in which final knowledge of things is understood to be impossible."

=== The Words of Paris (Les Mots de Paris, 2000) ===
"Les Mots de Paris", a piece dealing with the by turns romanticised and stigmatised existence of homeless people, was realised to mark the new millennium. While they were in France once the subject of films, poems and songs, known as "clochards", nowadays the "SDF" (sans domicile fixe) are banned not only from popular culture, but also from the French capital's tourist hotspots. Gerz hired 12 homeless people for a period of six months as part of the artwork and rehearsed the exhibition with them on the most visited square in Paris – the forecourt of Notre-Dame Cathedral. In the unusual exhibition local passers-by and tourists from all over the world came face-to-face with those who had become invisible. The homeless people spoke openly about their lives "behind the mirror" to an audience that was often surprised and hesitantly entered into a dialogue with them on poverty, social exclusion and the role of art.

=== amaptocare, Ballymun, Dublin (2003 to present) ===
The amaptocare ("A Map to Care") project asked members of the public, especially from the Ballymun area, to sponsor a tree, select an area for its planting, and develop, in discussion with Gerz, generally face-to-face, a personal reflection to accompany it. It led to the planting of more than 630 trees from a choice of 15 varieties, which will grow for decades, each with its own metal plaque with the donor's words inscribed. A second phase of the project, with donor names blasted into the civic plaza of the area, and an illuminated map, was deferred but is expected to eventually be completed.

=== Future Monument, Coventry (2004) ===
The "Future Monument" is the people of Coventry's comment on their often quite traumatic past. Its story is one of enemies who became friends. 6,000 citizens contributed to the project, offering statements at once public and personal in response to the question: "Who are yesterday's enemies?" The city commemorated its destruction in the Coventry Blitz during the Second World War while at the same time discovering how many immigrants there are in its current population, and what it means to have been a colony (England itself is named third). The most often named former enemies are listed on eight glass plaques on the ground in front of a glass obelisk:

To our German friends To our Russian friends To our British friends To our French friends To our Japanese friends To our Spanish friends To our Turkish friends To our Irish friends

=== 2-3 Streets. An Exhibition in Cities of the Ruhr District (2008–11) ===
As a part of the European Capital of Culture Ruhr.2010 Jochen Gerz invited people to live in the Ruhr region rent-free for one year, in the project 2-3 Streets. An Exhibition in Cities of the Ruhr (German: 2-3 Straßen. Eine Ausstellung in Städten des Ruhrgebiets). This produced both a literary work of collective authorship and a unique social process in the cultural landscape, summarised as: '"2-3 Streets" not only aims to change the streets, but also art.'

Three cities (Duisburg, Dortmund and Mülheim an der Ruhr) decided to take part in "2-3 Streets"; each one selected a street in a "socially difficult neighbourhood" and renovated vacant living spaces. A total of 58 apartments were made available. By the end of 2008, 1,457 candidates from 30 countries had responded to the invitation to participate ("basic income: living rent-free for a year"). Over the next year there followed intensive e-mail communication with the candidates. The criterion for participation was motivation to shape a foreign environment for a year and to write regularly. Eventually, 78 participants were selected.

The public artwork began on 1 January 2010 and ended 31 December of the same year. During this time, over 1,300 visitors, in the tradition of Bazon Brock's visitors’ school at documenta 4 (1968), spent time in the streets as art. The "visitors’ school in 2-3 streets", turned the reality of everyday life on the streets into an aesthetic experience. Sociologists, cultural scientists and town planners undertook scientific studies, and the media threw an additional light on what were otherwise marginal and often problematic districts with a high percentage of migrant unemployment. New public spheres were created, allowing each street to develop a new image of itself.

Sustainability was discussed critically by sociologists, cultural scientists and city planners, but "social creativity" in this context proved to be a sustainable practice. While year after year, the cities of the Ruhr continued to shrink, over half of the participants of "2-3 Streets" decided at the end of the artwork to stay in their streets as new residents of the region. In Dortmund they continue the work on their own initiative since then under the name "Borsig11".

==== The artistic concept ====
In his artistic concept (2006) Gerz refers to three books which open up a multiperspective context for "2-3 Streets": "The Rise of the Creative Class" by Richard Florida, "The Cultural Creatives" by Paul H. Ray and Sherry R. Anderson and "The Fall of Public Man" by Richard Sennett. The "2-3 Streets"-concept was for three perfectly normal streets with vacant flats in the Ruhr area to be turned into an art exhibition for one year. 78 creatives were invited to live rent-free in this exhibition and, as part of it, become authors of a joint text to be published at the end of the year. As everyone in the three streets was able to take part – old and new tenants, passers-by and visitors of the exhibition – neither the text created in this fashion nor the development of social relationships and changes on the streets could be anticipated: "We write… and in the end my street won't be the same."

==== Text ====
The purpose of the one-year exhibition "2-3 Streets" was to bring change to the streets by creating a collaborative text. The result was a book written in 16 languages on 3,000 pages by 887 authors, including both old and new inhabitants as well as visitors to the three streets. At the end of 2-3 Streets, half of the participants chose to remain and continue their life together.

The contributions were generated online and were saved chronologically in a central digital archive, which could not be viewed in 2010 while the text was being created. Even the authors themselves did not have access to the work-in-progress; they could not call up their texts, or correct them, or react to preceding contributions. This constant creative process presented itself in the text as the present. The contributions flowed seamlessly and swelled into a "river without banks". A total of 887 people created 10,000 contributions in 16 different languages. Their work impacted the streets in many ways. The "2-3 Streets TEXT" amounted to some 3,000 pages in the publication. "Writing is overcoming emptiness and thus is the epitome of change." "Creativity, as understood here, is not the privilege of artists, but rather a renewable social energy".

=== Square of the European Promise (2004–15) ===
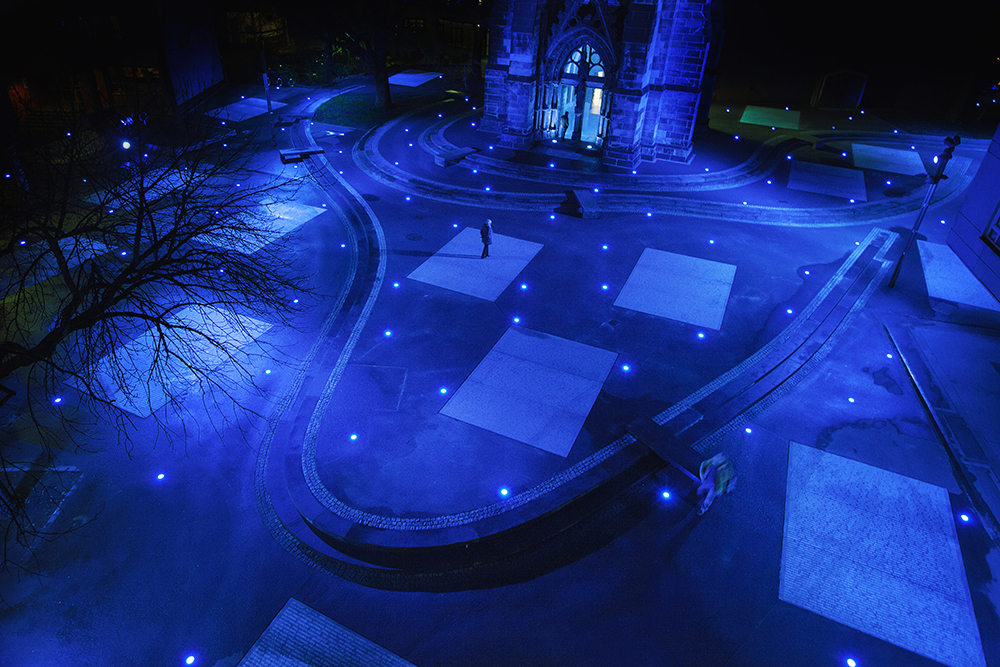
Platz des europäischen Versprechens, Bochum 2015

The "Square of the European Promise" (Platz des europäischen Versprechens, Bochum ) was likewise part of the European Capital of Culture Ruhr.2010 and was commissioned already in 2004 by the City of Bochum. It is located in the city centre, right next to the town hall. Participants were asked to make a promise to Europe, which remains unpublished. Instead of the promises, the names of their authors from all over Europe fill the square in front of Christ Church, of which only the tower, featuring a surprising mosaic from 1931 of Germany's 28 "enemy states" (England, France, USA, Poland, Russia, China ...) survived the war. The "Square of the European Promise" holds a total of 14,726 names. It was handed over to the public 11 years after its inception, on 11 December 2015.

== Public Authorship ==
The term “public authorship” originates from the artistic work of Jochen Gerz. It emerged around 2003/04 with his work in Coventry and initially denotes, in the narrower sense, the artistic conception and practice of anti-monuments, collaborations, and author projects in public space. Individual elements of this artistic strategy can be traced back to his early work, such as the reflection on the concept of authorship, participation, dialogical production, or the relationship between art and life.

“Public Authorship” is also the title of the final chapter of “Contemporaneities” (2017). The concept extends beyond the institutional framework of the art world. In 2023, the artist founded the Jochen Gerz Public Authorship Foundation at GLS Treuhand in order to continue his work beyond art. “Every utterance by every person in every context is to be regarded as an individual contribution to a public sphere. All contributions by everyone are thereby to be understood as contributions by authors,” writes Guido Meincke in his essay “Public Authorship” (2025). “Public authorship—whether as art or something else—is work on the realization of a vision: the future of democracy.”

== Reception ==
As Georg Jappe said back in 1977, "Artists like to consider Jochen Gerz a man of letters, failing to find materiality and form in his work; literati in turn like to call Jochen Gerz an artist, as they see a lack of content, categorical order and style." It is striking how Gerz occasionally causes confusion and irritation even among connoisseurs of his work. Thus Jappe ended his talk with the words: "Upon reading this I notice that I have probably not succeeded in giving you any real understanding of Jochen Gerz, which would anyway not be in keeping with his persona." His works are elusive, creating a space that only the recipients themselves can fill. "Epistemological doubt in the power of image and text alone to convey meaning can be observed in the works of Jochen Gerz more clearly than in any other contemporary artistic oeuvre. His installations highlight the extent to which images derive their frames of reference from texts, and phrases their wealth of associations first and foremost from images, while continually qualifying and shifting them."

Gerz's works in public space are frequently subject to controversy. His participatory projects in particular often consist of unpredictable social "negotiations" mirroring not only the art world but society as a whole, as in the case of the Harburg "Monument against Fascism". The public is part of the artwork. Its reception therefore occurs inside as well as outside of an artistic context, giving the work civic or political relevance. Public authorship pieces pose a particular challenge to the passive role of the viewer. The emancipation of the observer, transcending reception to include participation, becomes a requirement, because the development processes for these works, often spanning several years, depend on public authorship. "In a democratic society there can be no place for mere spectators", says Jochen Gerz. He also notes: "The division of the world into artists and audiences endangers democracy."

== Personal life ==
Gerz has lived in Sneem, County Kerry, Ireland, since 2007, with his wife, Laurence Vanpoulle. He has organised both a community arts project and, with his wife and others, a campaign to secure a local doctor.

== Awards and honours ==
- 1978: Glockengießergasse Award, Cologne
- 1980: Videonale Award, Bonn
- 1990: Roland Award for Public Art (for the Harburg Monument against Fascism)
- 1995: German Critics Award (Visual Art)
- 1996: Ordre National du Mérite, Paris
- 1996: Peter Weiss Award of the City of Bochum
- 1998: Grand Prix National des Arts Plastiques, Paris
- 1999: Award of the Helmut Kraft Foundation, Stuttgart
- 1999: Artistic Contribution Award, Montréal
- 2002: Prix Evens, Paris
- 2005: "Aus gegebenem Anlass" artist award, Hanover
- 2011: Special Award of the Montag Stiftung Kunst und Gesellschaft, Faktor Kunst, Bonn

== Selected texts by Jochen Gerz ==
- Jochen Gerz: Footing. Paris/Gießen 1968.
- Jochen Gerz: Annoncenteil. Arbeiten auf/mit Papier, Luchterhand Verlag, Neuwied 1971.
- Jochen Gerz: Die Beschreibung des Papiers. Darmstadt/Neuwied 1973.
- Jochen Gerz: Die Zeit der Beschreibung, Lichtenberg 1974.
- Jochen Gerz and Francis Levy (eds.), EXIT/Das Dachau-Projekt, Roter Stern Verlag, Frankfurt 1978.
- Jochen Gerz: Von der Kunst / De l’art, AQ-Verlag, Dudweiler 1985.
- Jochen Gerz: Texte, edited by Erich Franz, Bielefeld 1985.
- Jochen Gerz: Daran denken, Texte in Arbeiten 1980–1996, Düsseldorf 1997.
- Jochen Gerz: Drinnen vor der Tür. Reden an Studenten, edited by Hans Belting, Ostfildern 1999.

== Selected exhibition catalogues /documentation ==
- Jochen Gerz: Foto, Texte, The French Wall & Stücke, Badischer Kunstverein, Karlsruhe 1975.
- Jochen Gerz: Die Schwierigkeiten des Zentaurs beim vom Pferd steigen, Kunstraum München 1976.
- Jochen Gerz: Exit / Das Dachau Projekt, Frankfurt 1978.
- Jochen Gerz: The Fuji-Yama-Series, Dudweiler 1981.
- Jochen Gerz: Le grand amour, Dudweiler 1982.
- Jochen Gerz: Griechische Stücke / Kulchur Pieces, Ludwigshafen 1984.
- Jochen Gerz: La Chasse / The Strip, Kunstraum München 1986.
- Jochen Gerz: Œuvres sur papier photographique 1983–86, Musée des Beaux-Arts de Calais 1986.
- Jochen Gerz: Exhibition catalogue Kunstsammlung Nordrhein-Westfalen, Düsseldorf 1988.
- Jochen Gerz: Life after humanism, Stuttgart 1992.
- Jochen Gerz: 2146 Steine – Mahnmal gegen Rassismus, Ostfildern 1993.
- Jochen Gerz and Esther Shalev-Gerz: Das Harburger Mahnmal gegen Faschismus, Ostfildern 1994.
- Jochen Gerz: Die Bremer Befragung: sine somno nihil, 1990–95, Ostfildern 1995.
- Jochen Gerz: Gegenwart der Kunst, Regensburg 1996.
- Jochen Gerz: Get out of my lies, Wiesbaden 1997.
- Jochen Gerz: Res Publica. Das öffentliche Werk 1968–1999, Ostfildern 1999.
- Jochen Gerz: Werkverzeichnis vols. I-IV, Nuremberg 1999/2011.
- Jochen Gerz: Das Geld, die Liebe, der Tod, die Freiheit, Jena 2001.
- Jochen Gerz: Der Wettbewerb, Cologne 2004.
- Jochen Gerz: Die Anthologie der Kunst, edited by Marion Hohlfeldt, Cologne 2004.
- Jochen Gerz: Platz der Grundrechte. Ein Autorenprojekt, Nuremberg 2006.
- Jochen Gerz: Salviamo la luna, edited by Matteo Balduzzi, Milan 2008.
- Jochen Gerz: 2-3 Straßen TEXT / 2-3 Straßen MAKING OF, Cologne 2011.
- Jochen Gerz: 63 years after – work with the public, edited by Werner Fenz, Vienna 2016.
- Jochen Gerz: The Art of Multitude – Jochen Gerz and the European Experience, edited by Jonathan Vickery and Mechtild Manus, Frankfurt / New York 2016.
- Jochen Gerz: Resemblance in the work of Jochen Gerz, by Octave Debary, Paris 2017.
