= Lisa Le Feuvre =

Lisa Le Feuvre is a curator, writer, editor and public speaker. In 2017 she was appointed the inaugural executive director of Holt/Smithson Foundation, an artist endowed foundation that aims to continue the creative and investigative legacies of the artists Nancy Holt and Robert Smithson.

Focusing on art as a powerful force to retune perceptions, Le Feuvre's research takes the form of exhibitions, publications, collections and public lectures. She has curated exhibitions in museums and galleries across Europe, published her writings in international publications and journals, spoken in museums and universities across the world, and has played a pivotal role in shaping academic and arts organizations.

Between 2010 and 2017 Le Feuvre was Head of Sculpture Studies at the Henry Moore Institute, a part of the Henry Moore Foundation. She led a program of education, research, publications and exhibitions, and the development of the Leeds sculpture and collection archive. Previously Le Feuvre taught on the post-graduate curatorial program at Goldsmiths College, led the contemporary art program at the National Maritime Museum and was course director of the post-graduate program in Arts Policy and Management at Birkbeck College, University of London. She has sat on various juries including Sculpture Dublin (2021), Arnaldo Pomodoro Foundation Prize (2019), the Turner Prize (2018), Hepworth Prize for Sculpture (2016), British representation at the Venice Biennale (2015), the Max Mara Prize for Women (2013), and co-curated the quinquennial exhibition British Art Show 7: In the Days of the Comet (2009–10).

== Life and early career ==
Le Feuvre was born in Guernsey, Channel Islands, emigrating to the UK in her mid-teens, first to the south of England. Three years later she moved to London to study Social Sciences, followed by Architecture, Arts Management, and Visual Cultures.

She started her work as a curator at The Photographers’ Gallery, initiating an innovative program of talks, events, and film screenings as well as curating exhibitions including 'Mediterranean: Between Reality and Utopia', 'Donovan Wylie: The Maze' (with Magnum Photographs), 'Pierre Bourdieu: In Algeria: Testimonies of Uprooting' (with Camera Austria), and 'Hashem El Madani: Studio Practices' (with Akram Zataari), which won the 2005 the John Kobal Photography Book Prize. In the early 2000s she co-initiated the experimental exhibition and performance space Hoxton Distillery in east London, between 2002 and 2003 was Curator of Public Programs at Tate Britain, and from 2003 to 2005 co-ordinated the Parknights series of talks, discussions, and films at the Serpentine Gallery.

Through the 2000s Le Feuvre was based in academia. Until 2004 she was Course Director of the postgraduate program in Arts Policy and Management at Birkbeck College, London and then taught on the postgraduate Curatorial Program at Goldsmiths, University of London. In addition she contributed to the MA in Contemporary Art at Sotheby’s Institute, BA Arts Management at London Southbank University, and the Foundation in Art and Design at Chelsea School of Art, London. She continues to examine doctoral research and deliver guest lectures to international art schools and universities.

Le Feuvre lives in London, UK and New Mexico, USA.

== Curatorial projects and institutional leadership ==
Le Feuvre has curated more than seventy exhibitions as an institutional and independent curator, played a pivotal role in shaping academic and arts organizations, edited over thirty books and journals, spoken at 150 museums and universities across the world, and has published more than 125 essays and interviews with artists. Her curatorial practice started in artist-run spaces, with her first published writing on dance music and the London night club scene.

Her independent exhibition projects include (curated with Thomas Feulmer) 'For What It’s Worth: Value Systems in Art since 1960' at The Warehouse, Dallas' in 2024; Gordon Matta-Clark: The Space Between' (2003; CCA, Glasgow; Architectural Association, London); 'Avalanche 1970-1976' (2005; Chelsea Space, London); 'Economies of Attention: Leisure, Resistance, Desire and Labour' at Arts Council England; and a series of exhibitions at Stills, Edinburgh: 'Simon Faithfull: Iceblink' (2006), 'Joachim Koester: Poison Protocols and Other Histories' (2009), 'Alexander and Susan Maris: The Pursuit of Fidelity (a ‘retrospective’)' (2010) and (2011). In 2010-11 she curated (with Tom Morton) the seventh edition of the British Art Show, the quinquennial survey exhibition; titled In the Days of the Comet it was presented in Nottingham (Nottingham Contemporary, Nottingham Castle Museum and New Art Exchange), London (Hayward Gallery), Glasgow (CCA, Tramway, Gallery of Modern Art, Glasgow) and across four venues in Plymouth.

At the National Maritime Museum, Greenwich she directed the New Visions contemporary art program between 2005 and 09. Her program invited artists to develop new work in response to the social-political histories of the sea, ships, stars, and time. She worked with Renée Green, Dan Holdsworth, Jeremy Millar, Simon Patterson, Esther Shalev-Gerz, and Lawrence Weiner. to develop expansive exhibition projects.

Between 2010 and 2017 Le Feuvre was a member of the Strategic Management Team at the Henry Moore Foundation, leading the Henry Moore Institute. Running the research component of the largest artist foundation in Europe, she directed a programme of education, publications and exhibitions of the highest standard; led the Leeds Museums & Galleries Sculpture Collection and Archive, one of the strongest public collections of British sculpture; and sat on the Foundation's Grants Committee; oversaw a world-leading sculpture library and Research Fellowship program; edited the Institute’s publishing; and with local partners initiated the Yorkshire Sculpture Triangle, which became Yorkshire Sculpture International. As well as supporting a team to develop a robust exhibition program, she led on exhibitions including Jiro Takamatsu: The Temperature of Sculpture (2017), Aleksandra Domanović: Votives (2017) The Body Extended: Sculpture and Prosthetics (2016), Paul Neagu: Palpable Sculpture (2015), Katrina Palmer: The Necropolitan Line (2015), The Event Sculpture (2014), Ian Kiaer: Tooth House (2014) Gego: Line as Object (2013), Robert Filliou: The Institute of Endless Possibilities (2013) Sarah Lucas: Ordinary Things (2012), and Mario Merz: What Is To Be Done? (2011).

In 2017 she was invited to be the first Executive Director of Holt/Smithson Foundation, an artist-endowed foundation dedicated to the creative legacies of the artists Nancy Holt (1938-2014) and Robert Smithson (1938–73). While leading the Foundation she has curated significant exhibition of Nancy Holt and Robert Smithson, including 'Casting A Glance: Dancing with Smithson' at Marian Goodman Gallery in Los Angeles (2025); ‘Nancy Holt: Circles of Light’ at the Gropius Bau, Berlin (2024, curated with Clara Meister), ‘Robert Smithson / Teresita Fernández’ at SITE SANTA FE (2024, curated with Fernández), ‘Nancy Holt: Power Systems’ and ‘Maria Hupfield: The Endless Return of Fabulous Panther (Biimskojiwan)’ at the Wexner Center for the Arts, Ohio (2024); ‘Robert Smithson: Mundus Subterraneous’ at Galerie Marian Goodman, Paris (2024, with Adrian Rifkin); ‘Nancy Holt / Inside Outside’ at Bildmuseet, Sweden (2022–23, with Katarina Pierre; touring to MACBA, Barcelona), ‘Light and Language' at Lismore Castle Arts (2021), and in 2020/21 the solo exhibitions exploring the work of Robert Smithson at Marian Goodman Gallery ‘Hypothetical Islands’ (London), ‘Primordial Beginnings’ (Paris), and ‘Abstract Cartography’ (London).

== Writing, editing, public speaking ==
Le Feuvre’s editorial work includes the Henry Moore Institute’s journal ‘Essays on Sculpture', and the Institute’s publication program between 2010 and 2017; the MIT Press compilation 'Failure' in the MIT / Whitechapel Art Gallery’s 'Documents on Contemporary Art' series; the second issue of 'NOIT,' the journal of John Latham's Flat Time House, on the topic of burning; and Holt/Smithson Foundation's on-going digital Scholarly Texts.

Since 2000 Le Feuvre has contributed to art journals and written extensively in publications on topics that include prosthetics, sculpture and failure. Since 2017 she has written on artists including Auguste Rodin (2021, Tate Modern, London), Kiki Smith (2021; Musée cantonal des Beaux-Arts de Lausanne), Mario Merz (2021 Hangar Bicocca, Milan), Eva Rothschild (2019, Ireland at Venice), Günther Förg (2018, Yale University Press), Michael Kienzer (2017, Gerhard-Marcks-Haus), and has published interviews with Thomas J. Price (2021, The Powerplant, Toronto), Christine Corday (2019, Contemporary Art Museum St Louis) and Emilia Kabakov (2017, Art Monthly, London).

Le Feuvre has delivered lectures at international museums, universities, and art schools including Centre for the Humanities, Graduate Center, City of New York University; Dia Art Foundation; Galleria Nazionale d'Arte Moderna, Rome; ICA, London; Muzeum Sztuki, Łódź, Poland; Periferico Centro Arte Contemporanea, Caracas, Venezuela; Sabanci University, Istanbul, Turkey; Tate, London; and University of Queensland Art Gallery, Brisbane.
