= Le Monument vivant de Biron =

1996 work by German artist Jochen Gerz

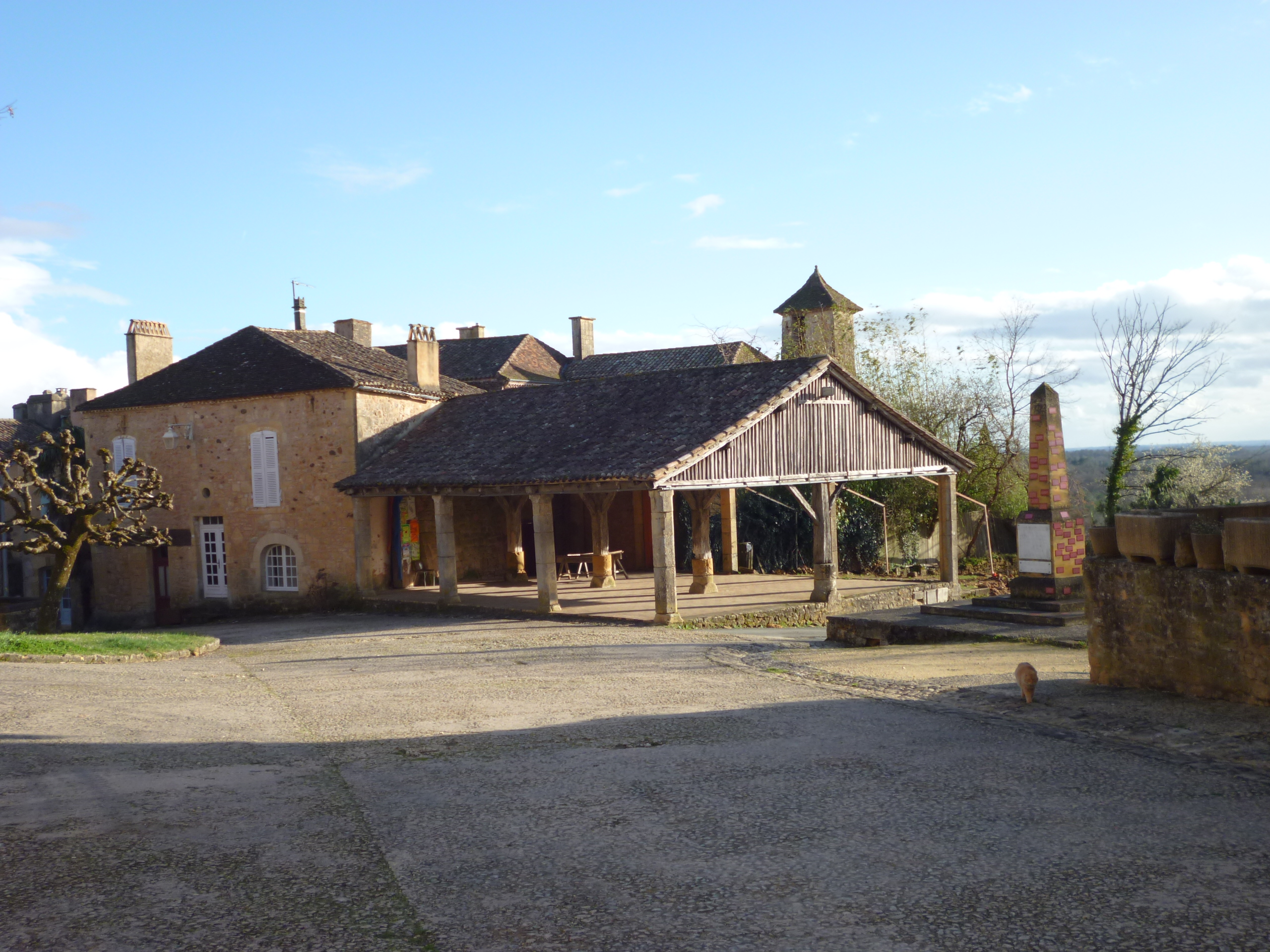
- The monument is located on Place Jean-Poussou, in Biron, near the wooden market hall.

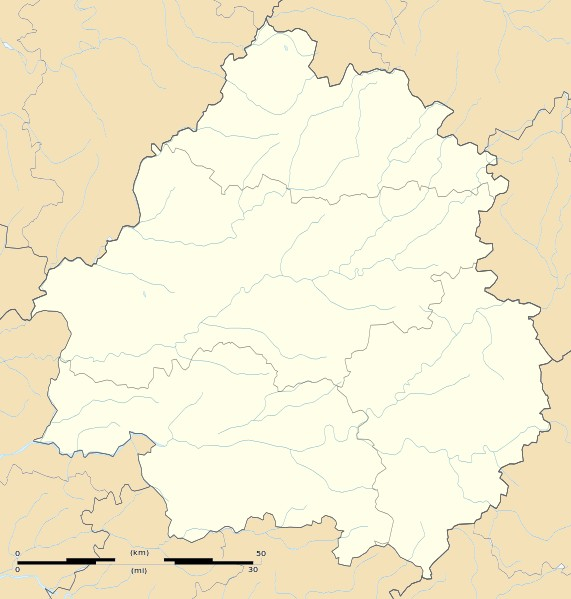
- Artist: Jochen Gerz
- Year: 1996
- Medium: Work in progress
- Movement: Contemporary Art
- Subject: War memorial
- Dimensions: 360 cm × 316 cm × 316 cm (140 in × 124 in × 124 in)
- Location: France Biron; 44°37′53″N 0°52′18″E

The Monument vivant de Biron is a work by German artist Jochen Gerz, inaugurated in 1996. On the former war memorial in front of a wooden hall in the French commune of Biron, in the Dordogne department, the artist randomly and anonymously placed plaques engraved with the answers of local residents to the question: "What do you think would be important enough to risk your life for?" Originally consisting of 127 plaques, this "living anti-monument" is a typical example of the work-in-progress technique, enriching itself over time with the confessions of new residents.

The monument is seen as both an art object and the result of a local social and democratic process. Critically acclaimed, Le Monument vivant de Biron is a benchmark among atypical war memorials and contemporary works of art. Since the 2000s, it has been studied in France at elementary and secondary school level.

== Context ==
The Dordogne is one of the richest départements in terms of heritage. Tourists visiting the Périgord are particularly interested in its historic monuments and numerous castles, including Château de Biron. As tourism is above all an important economic factor for local communities (over a third of their annual income), all development projects in rural and agricultural areas are strongly encouraged. Numerous pro-active policies were part of the "heritage vogue" in France in the 1990s. A vast heritage investment project was launched in the south of the department by the elected representatives of the Beaumont canton, in conjunction with the architect of the Bâtiments de France, the Direction régionale des affaires culturelles (DRAC) and the Ministry of Culture, to develop new works that would involve "all sectors of local life".

In 1992, when Biron mayor Marc Mattera began road renovation work, he asked the French Ministry of Culture to launch a national public order to replace the town's war memorial, which had fallen into disrepair and oblivion. Located at the entrance to the village on the Place Jean-Poussou, (Note: The monument is precisely located between the wooden market hall, the line of the old ramparts and the path leading to Château de Biron.) the white cement obelisk had been erected in 1921-1922 in memory of the dead of the Great War, then World War II. German artist Jochen Gerz was chosen to restore the monument, even though the commune's inspector of historical monuments was initially opposed to the artist's selection. He is known as the precursor of "anti-monumental" practices, which aim to redesign monuments whose sole function is to remember tragic events. The Monument vivant de Biron followed two other similar and singular works by the artist: Le contre-monument au fascisme de Hambourg (1986) and Le contre-monument au racisme de Sarrebruck (1993), which were already famous for overturning the concept of the war memorial and the symbolism of remembrance.

== Description and design ==
The monument (Note: The dimensions of the monument are as follows: 360cm*316cm*316cm) was rebuilt identically in yellow Dordogne and Burgundy stone, then raised on a plinth, the whole placed on a three-degree sloping base. Jochen Gerz began by refixing the two old plaques on the monument: "Aux morts de la Grande Guerre, perpétuel souvenir" (To those deceased during the Great War, perpetual remembrance) (nine names) and "Déportés 1944" (Deported 1944) (two names).

With the idea of passing on the memory of the past from generation to generation, the artist collaborated with students from the Bordeaux School of Fine Arts. In March 1996, Jochen Gerz conducted two weeks of individual interviews with the village's 127 oldest inhabitants. At first, the inhabitants were impressed by the artist's image and, what's more, his German nationality, which seemed to be at odds with the task of renovating the monument. However, he systematically began by introducing himself and explaining the reasons for his presence, in order to establish a climate of trust. In each interview, he slipped in a question: "What do you think would be important enough to risk your life for?" With the support of the students, he recorded their answers by hand. Isolated in the rhythm of the exchanges, it is these confessions, each around seven lines long, which were then engraved on red enamelled iron plaques (Note: The dimensions of each plate are as follows: 10*17,5*1 cm) and placed randomly and anonymously on the monument and even on the ground. It is the plurality, eclecticism and spontaneity of the responses that make up the work.

Jochen Gerz encourages the continuation of this interactive and democratic process, which gives a voice to local residents: spectators are also co-authors of the work which thus takes the form of a work in progress. The artist has entrusted a couple living in the village with the responsibility of asking the question ad libitum, to new residents and to those who will come of age in the commune in the years to come. If the space on the monument runs out, additional blank plaques by the artist are kept by the couple. According to the artist, "the ideal would be for this work never to be finished and for no one to be able to see it in its entirety. And that others after the first two people to succeed me would continue to ask the question. It will be a work of mine that I will never know and that will never stop changing".

The Monument vivant de Biron was inaugurated on July 13, 1996, the day of the village festival. The monument remains the property of the commune of Biron.

It's the people from Biron that make up the monument.

— Jochen Gerz, in July, 1996.

== Interpretation ==
The work differs from conventional war memorials, which simply consist of a ritual formula generally appended to a vertical list of the names of the deceased. The stele alone is not the monument, but the set of plaques that spill out onto the ground. Unlike Mario Merz's La suite de Fibonacci (Strasbourg, 1994) (Note: La suite de Fibonacci by Mario Merz is made up of light boxes placed on the ground along a tramway line) and Jan Dibbets's Hommage à Arago (Paris, 1994), Le Monument vivant de Biron "aims for horizontality" through the arrangement of its plaques, and "offers itself on a human scale", according to Sébastien Thiery. The work thus breaks with "commemorative, monumental and perennial art, the home of artistic conformism". The artist's work is not aimed exclusively at an informed public, but also and above all feeds on social ties and dialogue with citizens.

To keep his message alive and open to interpretation, the work was conceived as both an art object and a social process of territorial and national unity. According to the artist himself, the monument "awaits a time that is not yet here", in addition to its function as an object of remembrance. It seeks to create a community in the present, to involve the public in the long term and to open up to the future. The aim is to share this place and lift the taboo of "loneliness", "absence", "emptiness" and "disappearance" resulting from the horrors of war and the Holocaust. The de-theatricalization and eviction of violence is one of the main features of Le Monument vivant de Biron. Sébastien Thiery also raised the question of the work's conviviality, presented as "a seductive communication operation aimed at citizen voters". He also saw it as a symbolic way of overexposing conflicts and masking nameless violence to legitimize the political and security order.

Jochen Gerz managed to turn this war memorial into a "living" work, hence the name of the work chosen by the artist. Audrey Rousseau adds that the meaning of this "living memory appropriate to the living" lies in the public's ability to understand and individually arrange the hidden meaning of symbolic elements; this is "an original way of linking the legacy of the two world wars based on the testimony of the living". In posing his question, Jochen Gerz is attentive to the commemorative needs of the people who will come into contact with the work. He discreetly invites them to express their pain, to reflect on what is important in their lives, and to take a stand on the value of their own lives. The choice of first-person narrative ("I" and "we") invites the public reading the plaques to feel the emotion of these stories. The local, national and specialized press agree that Le Monument vivant de Biron offers a moving and human experience of proximity.

By transgressing the boundaries of art as they are classically conceived, the work is considered by Sébastien Thiery to be an "ideal-typical of contemporary public monuments".

== Pedagogical use ==
In France, Le Monument vivant de Biron is the subject of study and analysis in art and art history classes at elementary and middle school levels. It is presented as a representative example of contemporary public art, war memorials, the interaction of art with the public, work in progress, commemorative sculpture, the "symbolic body" and "dynamic, embodied memory".

== Bibliography ==
- Gerz, Jochen (1996). Le Monument vivant de Biron: la question secrète (in French). Arles: Actes sud. ISBN 2-7427-0975-4. BNF: 35861506c.
- Académie de Nantes (October 2006). Arts plastiques – Document de travail (PDF). Nantes: Académie de Nantes.
- Ansel, Sandrine (February 9, 1996). "Jochen Gerz: la mémoire prend de l'élan". Courrier Français de Dordogne (in French).
- Arnaudet, Didier (1996). "Jochen Gerz Le monument vivant de Biron". Gironde Magazine (in French) (46): 24–25.
- Baumann, Roland (November 17, 1998). "Jochen Gerz – Un artiste de la mémoire". Regards: Tribune Juive de Belgique (in French): 38. OCLC 638823689.
- Becker, Annette; Andrieu, Claire; Lavabre, Marie-Claire; Tartakowsky, Danielle (2006). "Politique culturelle, commémorations, et leurs usages politiques: l'exemple de la Grande Guerre dans les années 1990". In Presses universitaires de Provence (ed.). Politiques du passé (in French). Aix-en-Provence. pp. 27–37. ISBN 9782853996303.
- Benoît, Zoé; Philippot, Bruno (October 2017). Dossier pédagogique – 14th Biennale de Lyon (PDF) (in French). Lyon: |Académie de Lyon and Académie de Grenoble. p. 56. Archived from the original (PDF) on 2022-01-03.
- Bergues, Martine; Amiel, Christiane (2016). "Vous n'avez pas Biron". In Éditions de la Maison des sciences de l'homme (ed.). Domestiquer l'histoire: Ethnologie des monuments historiques (in French). Paris. pp. 103–117. ISBN 9782735118762.
- Breerette, Geneviève (July 20, 1996). "Un artiste allemand redonne vie au monument aux morts d'un village de Dordogne". Le Monde (in French). ISSN 0395-2037.
- Brincken, Wolf von (1996). "Antworten aus Biron". Kunstzeitung (in German) (9): 18. ISSN 1431-2840.
- Centre national des arts plastiques (2020). "Le Monument vivant de Biron (Jochen Gerz)". Atlasmuseum (in French).
- Champenois, Michèle (July 8, 1996). "De mémoire de monument". Le Monde (in French). ISSN 0395-2037.
- Collège Jean-Rostand (May 15, 2012). Gerz Jochen, le monument vivant de Biron (PDF) (in French). Caen: Académie de Caen.
- Cuin, Maïa; Lavigne, Pascale (2018). Dossier d'accompagnement pédagogique – Mémoire de pierre de la Grande Guerre (PDF) (in French). Bordeaux: Académie de Bordeaux. p. 37. Archived from the original (PDF) on 2023-04-09.
- Czöppan, Gabi (July 8, 1996). "Beredsame Kunst". Focus (in French). ISSN 0943-7576.
- Dolf-Bonekämper, Gabi (August 9, 1996). "Die Verantwortung der Lebenden". Neue Zürcher Zeitung (in German). ISSN 0376-6829.
- Dussol, Dominique (1996). "Biron: les dialogues de pierres de Jochen Gerz". Le Festin (in French) (20): 72–75. ISSN 1143-676X.
- Fleck, Robert (December 1995). "In einer Welt voll Bilder ist die Kunst unsichtbar". Art - das Kunstmagazin (in German): 73–80. ISSN 0173-2781.
- Fricke, Harald (July 17, 1996). "Die Zeit der Schlachtordnungen ist vorbei". Die Tageszeitung (in German): 15. ISSN 0931-9085.
- Frisch, Alfred (June 29, 1996). Steinernes Gedächtnis (in German).
- Galy, A. (October 1996). "Pour que vive le monument aux morts de Biron". Le Journal du Périgord (in French): 6. ISSN 0999-6427.
- Gibert, Chantal (February 5, 1996). "Le monument de la mémoire". Sud Oues (in French). ISSN 1760-6454.
- Gibert, Chantal (April 1, 1996). "Le monument de la mémoire". Sud Oues (in French). ISSN 1760-6454.
- Godfrey, Dominique (May 26, 1996). "Donner sa vie, pour quoi ?". Sud Oues (in French): 33. ISSN 1760-6454.
- Guigues, Gilles (March 2015). "Témoigner pour faire mémoire du réel: Réflexions sur l'œuvre de Jochen Gerz" (PDF). Plastir (in French) (38): 16–18.
- Guinchard, C. (25 September 2018). "Commémoration 1914-1918". Académie de Besançon (in French).
- Haase, Amine (July 26, 1996). "Das immer wache Gedächtnis". Kölner Stadt-Anzeiger (in German). ISSN 1618-3061.
- Hanimann, Joseph (July 25, 1996). "Frag die Lebenden beizeiten nach dem Tod". Frankfurter Allgemeine Zeitung (in German). ISSN 0174-4909.
- Hillaire, Guillaume; Kopp, Jan; Look, Véronique (1996). "Jochen Gerz. Le Monument Vivant de Biron". Art Presence (in French) (19): 32–37. ISSN 1156-7627.
- Hohmeyer, Jürgen (June 30, 1996). "Fragen vom Erbfeind: Wofür sterben?". Der Spiegel (in German). ISSN 0038-7452.
- Lagnier, Sylvie (1999). "Sculpture et espace urbain en France: Histoire de l'instauration d'un dialogue, 1967-1992" (PDF). Espace Sculpture (in French) (49): 5–14.
- Leske, Marion (July 8, 1996). "Lebendes Denkmal von Gerz für ein französisches Dorf". Die Welt (in German). ISSN 0173-8437.
- Lorcin, Patricia M.E.; Brewer, Daniel (2009). France and Its Spaces of War: Experience, Memory, Image. New York City: Palgrave Macmillan. pp. 234–235. ISBN 978-0-230-61561-8.
- Mesnard, Philippe (1997). "Les questions de Jochen Gerz". Vacarme (in French). 4–5 (4): 72–75. doi:10.3917/vaca.004.0072.
- Mesnard, Philippe (October 2015). "L'entretien: Jochen Gerz" (PDF). Témoigner entre histoire et mémoire (in French) (121): 38–45.
- Metken, Günter (July 19, 1996). "Das Gedächtnis von Biron". Die Zeit (in German): 39. ISSN 0044-2070.
- Minghelli, Giuliana (2013). Landscape and Memory in PostFascist Italian Cinema: Cinema Year Zero. Oxford: Routledge. p. 132. ISBN 978-0-415-66108-9.
- Mohal, Anna (1996). "Lebendes Monument". Neue Bildende Kunst (in German): 98.
- Raguz, Petra (June 6, 1998). "Das lebende Monument im französischen Biron: Ein kühnes Projekt des Künstlers Jochen Gerz". Rhein Main Presse (in German): 5.
- Robert, Jean-Pierre (October 1996). "Mortel monument". L'Architecture d'Aujourd'hui (in French) (307): 22. ISSN 0003-8695.
- Rousseau, Audrey (2017). "La volonté politique de commémoration des morts appartient aux vivants". Conserveries mémorielles (in French) (21).
- Ruby, Christian (March 2007). La réécriture du monde politique par l'art public contemporain (pdf) (in French). Lille: Académie de Lille.
- Sabourdin, P.; Bouvier, M. (2005). Jalons pour une exploitation pédagogique consacrée à la sculpture commémorative (PDF) (in French). Limoges: Académie de Limoges.
- Saint Do, Valérie de (June 5, 1996). "L'artiste et la mémoire". Sud Ouest (in French). ISSN 1760-6454.
- Salgas, Jean-Pierre (1996). "Quoi de neuf sur la guerre ?". Art Press (in French): 27–30. ISSN 0245-5676.
- Schlocker, Georges (July 12, 1996). "Es gilt das Leben". Frankfurter Rundschau (in German). ISSN 0940-6980.
- Schmid, Karlheinz (April 13, 1996). "Der Frager". Informationsdienst Kunst (in German): 14–15.
- Schossig, Rainer B. (July 13, 1996). "Das Lebende Monument von Biron". Süddeutsche Zeitung (in German). ISSN 0174-4917.
- Sinz, Dagmar (August–September 1996). "Jochen Gerz zum lebenden Monument". Artis (in German). ISSN 2182-8571.
- Thiery, Sébastien (2003). "Quand l'ordre monumental devient convivial: la dénégation de la violence comme promesse d'une violence sans nom ?". Quaderni (in French). 53 (53): 125. doi:10.3406/quad.2003.1602.
- Tratnjek, Bénédicte (2009). "Questionnements géographiques sur les monuments aux morts: Symboliques et territoires de la commémoration" (PDF). Vox Geographi (in French) (1741).
- Vergeade, Franck (November 7, 1997). "A Biron, le monument aux morts a de la mémoire". Pèlerin Magazine: 28. ISSN 0764-4663.
- Wajcman, Gérard (1998). L'objet du siècle (in French). Lagrasse: Éditions Verdier. p. 192. ISBN 978-2-86432-681-6.
