= Gentileschi =

Gentileschi (pronounced [dʒentiˈleski]) is an Italian surname, notably borne by a family of Italian artists. These include:

- Artemisia Gentileschi (1593 – c. 1656), Italian painter, daughter of Orazio
- Francesco Gentileschi (1597 – c. 1665), Italian painter, son of Orazio and brother of Artemisia
- Orazio Gentileschi (1563–1639), Italian painter, father of Artemisia and Francesco

== See also ==
- 14831 Gentileschi, a minor planet named after Artemisia Gentileschi
