= Château de Biron =

Castle in Nouvelle-Aquitaine, France

Coordinates: 44°37′56″N 0°52′21″E

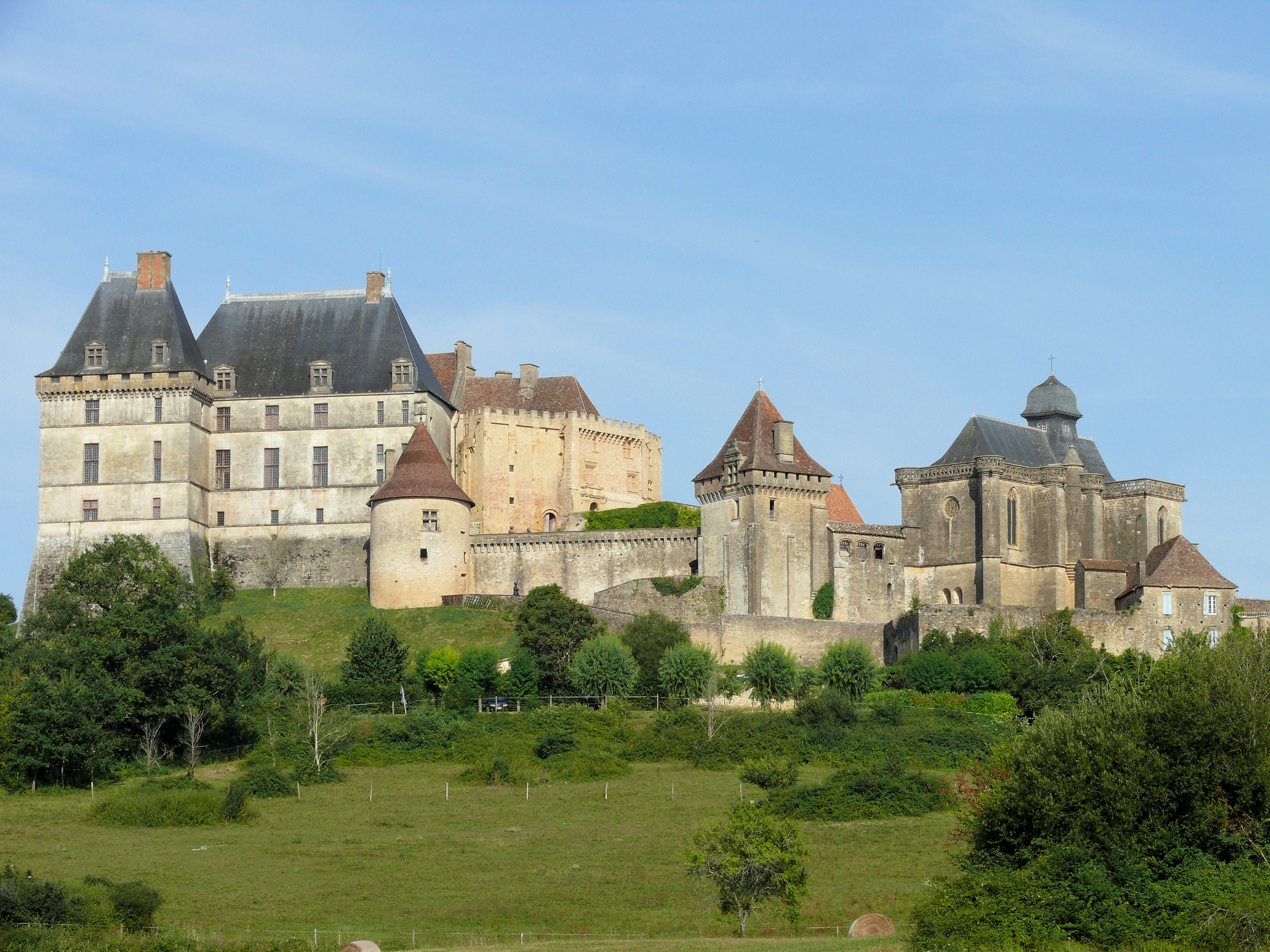
Château de Biron

The Château de Biron is a castle in the valley of the Lède in the commune of Biron in the Dordogne département of France.

== History ==
It was the castle from which the Gontaut-Biron took their name, their seat from the twelfth century. Biron was seized by the Cathars in 1211 and retaken by Simon de Montfort, 5th Earl of Leicester the following year. The Plantagenets held it at times during the 14th and 15th centuries. Biron was erected as a duché-pairie in 1598, for Charles de Gontaut, created duc de Biron.

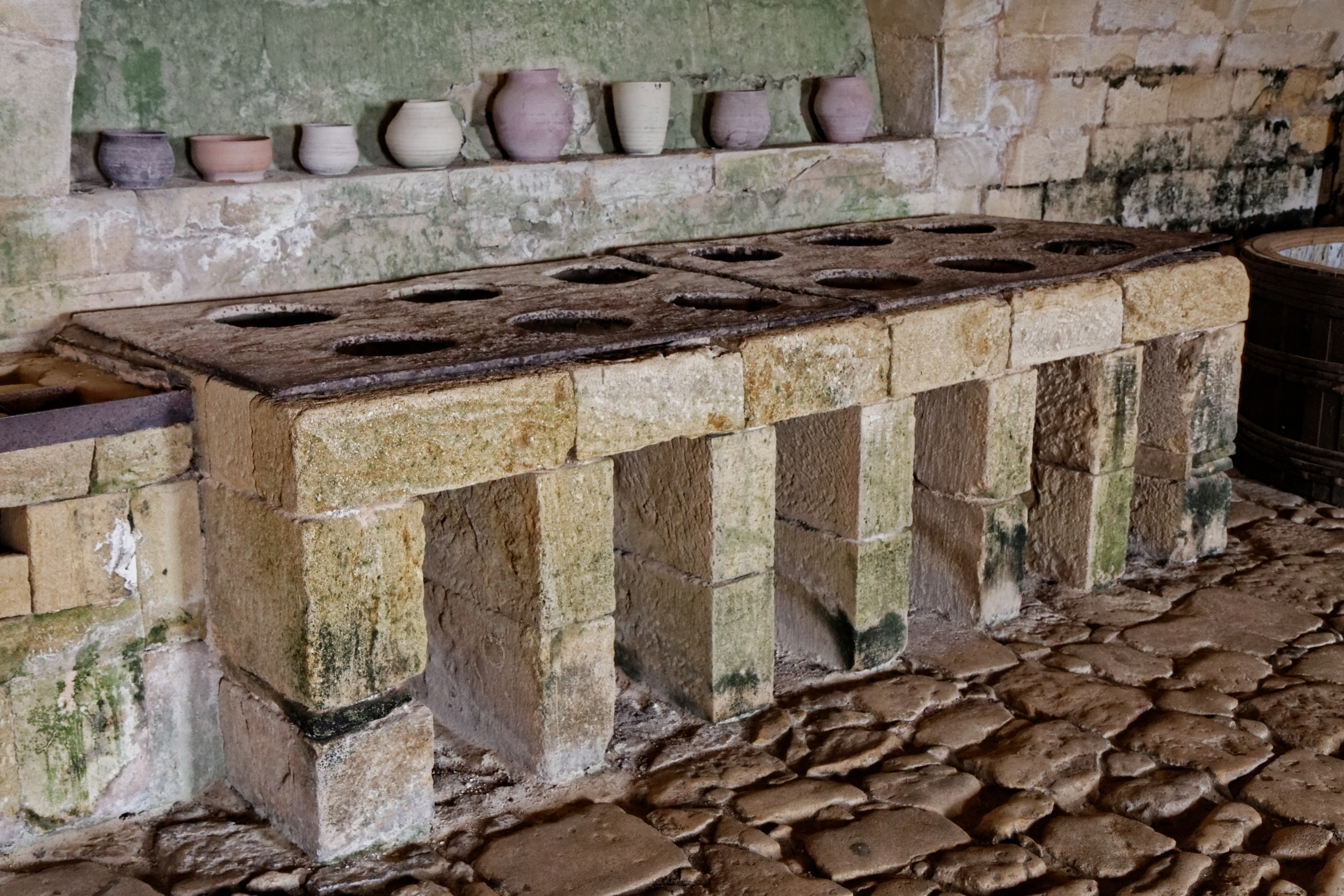
The castle kitchens

The present château bears additions over the centuries that make a picturesque ensemble: a twelfth-century keep, sixteenth-century living quarters, a chapel and vaulted kitchens. The commune purchased the Château de Biron in 1978, with a view to restoring the structure as a tourist draw.

Since 1928, the Château de Biron has been listed as a monument historique by the French Ministry of Culture.

== See also ==
- List of castles in France
- Le Monument vivant de Biron
