= Monpazier =

- Commune
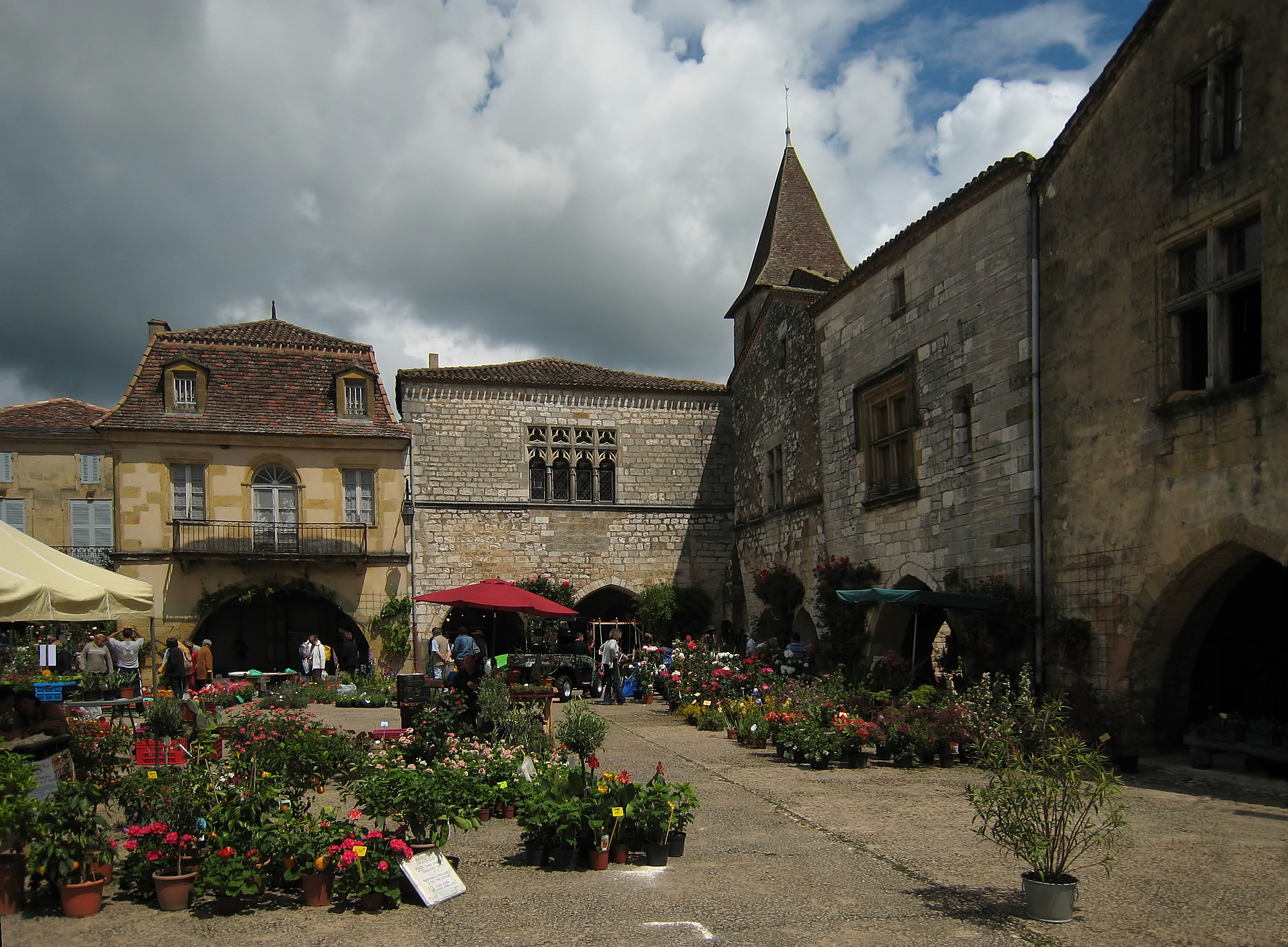
- The main square in Monpazier

- Coat of arms
- Location of Monpazier
- Location within France Location within Nouvelle-Aquitaine
- Coordinates: 44°40′54″N 0°53′42″E
- Country: France
- Region: Nouvelle-Aquitaine
- Department: Dordogne
- Arrondissement: Bergerac
- Canton: Lalinde

Government
  - Mayor (2020–2026): Fabrice Duppi
- Area^{1}: 0.5 km^{2} (0.19 sq mi)
- Elevation: 200 m (660 ft)
- Highest elevation: 222 m (728 ft)
- Lowest elevation: 144 m (472 ft)
- Population (2023): 441
  - Density: 880/km^{2} (2,300/sq mi)
- Time zone: UTC+01:00 (CET)
  - Summer (DST): UTC+02:00 (CEST)
- INSEE/Postal code: 24280 /24540
- ^{1} French Land Register data, which excludes lakes, ponds, glaciers > 1 km^{2} (0.386 sq mi or 247 acres) and river estuaries.

Monpazier (French pronunciation: [mɔ̃pazje]; Occitan: Montpasièr) is a commune in the Dordogne department in Nouvelle-Aquitaine, southwest France, located 40 kilometres from Bergerac Airport. It is a member of the Les Plus Beaux Villages de France ("The most beautiful villages of France") association, and in 2019 obtained the designation Ville et Metiers d'Art, thanks to the many artisans working in the village.

From 1790 to 2015, Monpazier was the capital of the canton of Monpazier.

== History ==
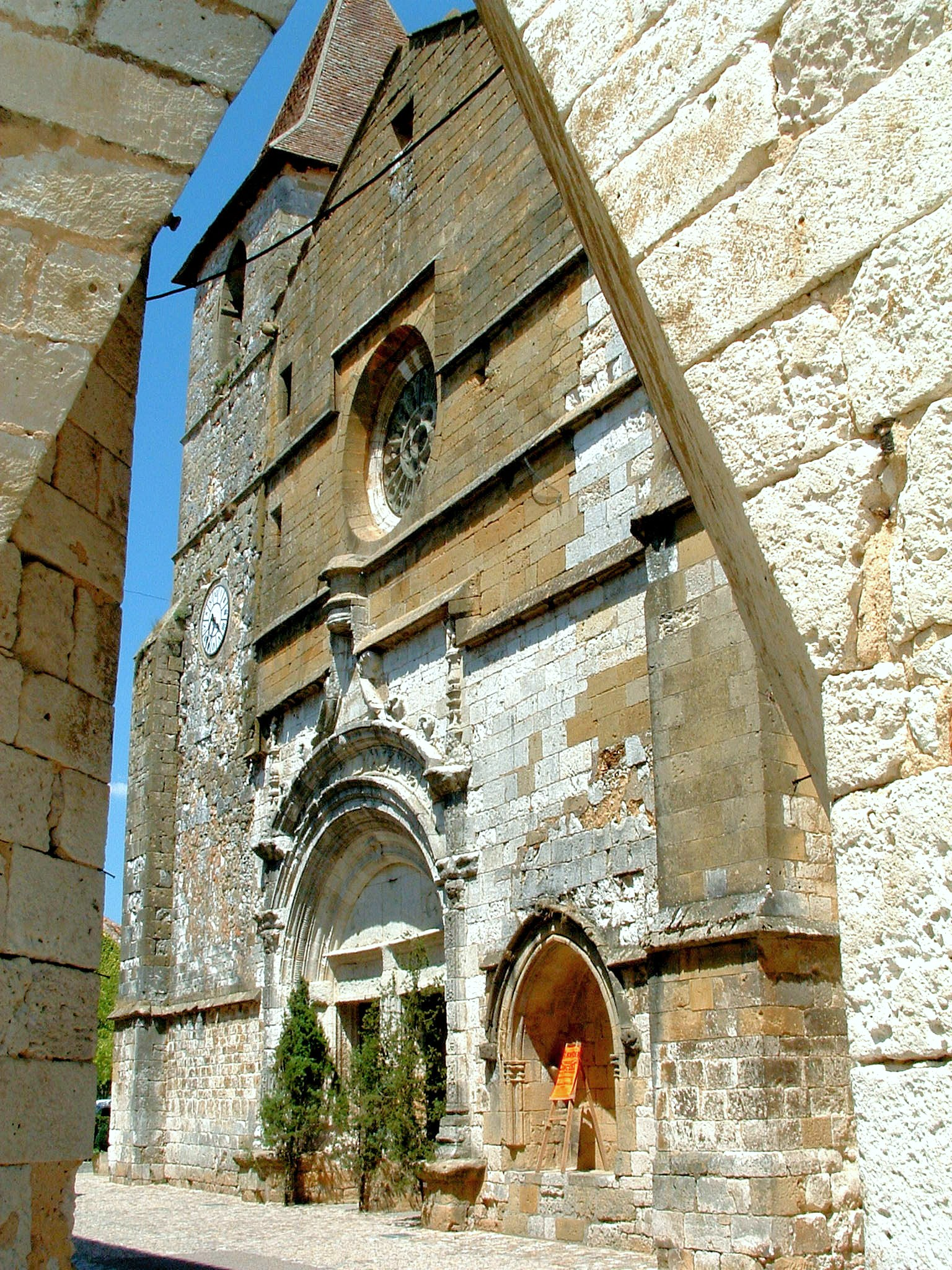
Church of St Dominique - The west façade seen through one of the cornières (angle openings) of the main square of Monpazier

Monpazier is a 13th-century bastide town founded in 1285 by King Edward I of England, who was also Duke of Gascony. It was created by an act of paréage, whereby the lord of Biron supplied the land, Edward the authority and permission, with any profits from taxes or commercial activity split between the two. Like other bastides, it was constructed using a grid pattern, with a square at its centre, one end of which contains an open market hall. One of the best preserved, it contains many original features.

== Attractions and events ==
The parish church of Monpazier is St. Dominique, built from the 13th through the 16th centuries. The church was built in a rectangular parcel and adjoins with a corner of the marketplace. The apse was added in the fifteenth century and the choir was believed to have been completed in 1506.

The town includes a four-star hotel named after its founder, the Hôtel Edward Premier.

During the summer months, Monpazier hosts a number of events of interest to tourists, including a cycle race around the bastide (usually at the start of August), a medieval day ('fete medieval'), a Kermesse and several specialist markets. Each July the Chorale of Monpazier gives a concert in the church.

== Population ==
Historical population
Year	Pop.	±% p.a.
1968	656	—
1975	558	−2.28%
1982	533	−0.65%
1990	531	−0.05%
1999	516	−0.32%
2007	530	+0.34%
2012	506	−0.92%
2017	473	−1.34%
2023	441	−1.16%
Source: INSEE

Its inhabitants are called Monpaziérois in French. The actor Julien Guiomar (1928-2010) spent his last years in Monpazier.

== See also ==
- Communes of the Dordogne department

== Sources ==
- * Morris, Marc (2009). A Great and Terrible King: Edward I and the Forging of Britain. Windmill Books. ISBN 978-0099481751.
