= Katrina Palmer =

British artist and writer

- Born: 1967 (age 58–59); London
- Education: University of Sussex, Central Saint Martins, Royal College of Art
- Awards: Award for Artists – Paul Hamlyn Foundation; 2014
- Website: katrinapalmerartist.com

Katrina Palmer (born 1967) is a British artist and writer, living in London. She is "best known for her investigations of sculptural materiality, which often involve written compositions and site-specific recordings". Palmer has had solo exhibitions at the Henry Moore Institute, the National Gallery, and Warwick Arts Centre. In 2014, she was co-winner of the Paul Hamlyn Foundation's Award for Artists.

== Early life and education ==
Palmer was born in London. She studied Philosophy and English literature at the University of Sussex (1986–89). She then worked in the publishing industry for a decade. She gained an undergraduate sculpture degree at Central Saint Martins (2001–04); and received an MA (2004–06) and a PhD (2012) from the Royal College of Art. In 2024 she received an honorary doctorate from the University of Sussex.

== Life and work ==
End Matter was a multi-platform project consisting of The Loss Adjusters, a site-specific installation and audio walk around some of the Isle of Portland (April–June 2015); "The Quarryman's Daughters", a broadcast on BBC Radio 4; and End Matter, a book. The project "attempted to account for the systematic removal of huge quantities of stone from Portland, an island off the Dorset coast". The book End Matter is "a non-book, consisting of appendices, acknowledgements, an epilogue, an index, a map, some postscripts… all the written notes and paraphernalia that surrounds a written work, but not the actual main body text".

Palmer was the National Gallery in London's 2024 Artist in Residence.

== Personal life ==
As of 2015, she lived in London, with her husband and son.

== Solo exhibitions ==
- The Loss Adjusters, a site-specific installation and audio walk, Isle of Portland, April–June 2015
- The Necropolitan Line, Henry Moore Institute, Leeds, December 2015 – February 2016.
- What's Already Going On, Mead Gallery, Warwick Arts Centre, January–March 2023
- The Touch Report, National Gallery, London, December 2024 – March 2025
- Four-Story, Flat-Roofed Complex in a Somewhat Expressionist Style, A Tale of A Tub, Rotterdam. February – May 2026

== Publications ==
- The Dark Object. Semina No. 5. London: Book Works, 2010. ISBN 978-1906012229. Second edition of 1000 copies. Third edition, 2023; edition of 1000 copies.
- The Fabricator's Tale. London: Book Works, 2014. ISBN 9781906012519. Edition of 1500 copies.
- End Matter. London: Book Works; Artangel, 2015. ISBN 9781906012731. Edition of 1500 copies.
- Black Slit. London: Book Works, 2023. ISBN 978-1-912570-29-4. Edition of 1000 copies.
- The Touch Report. London: Book Works, 2024. ISBN 9781912570355. Edition of 1000 copies.
- Want to see something real. London: National Gallery, 2024 ISBN 978-1-857097-30-6. Fully illustrated career survey including an essay on Palmer's work by Oreet Ashery.

== Awards ==
- 2014: Co-winner, Award for Artists, Paul Hamlyn Foundation. A £50,000 award.
