= Biron, Dordogne =

Biron
- Commune
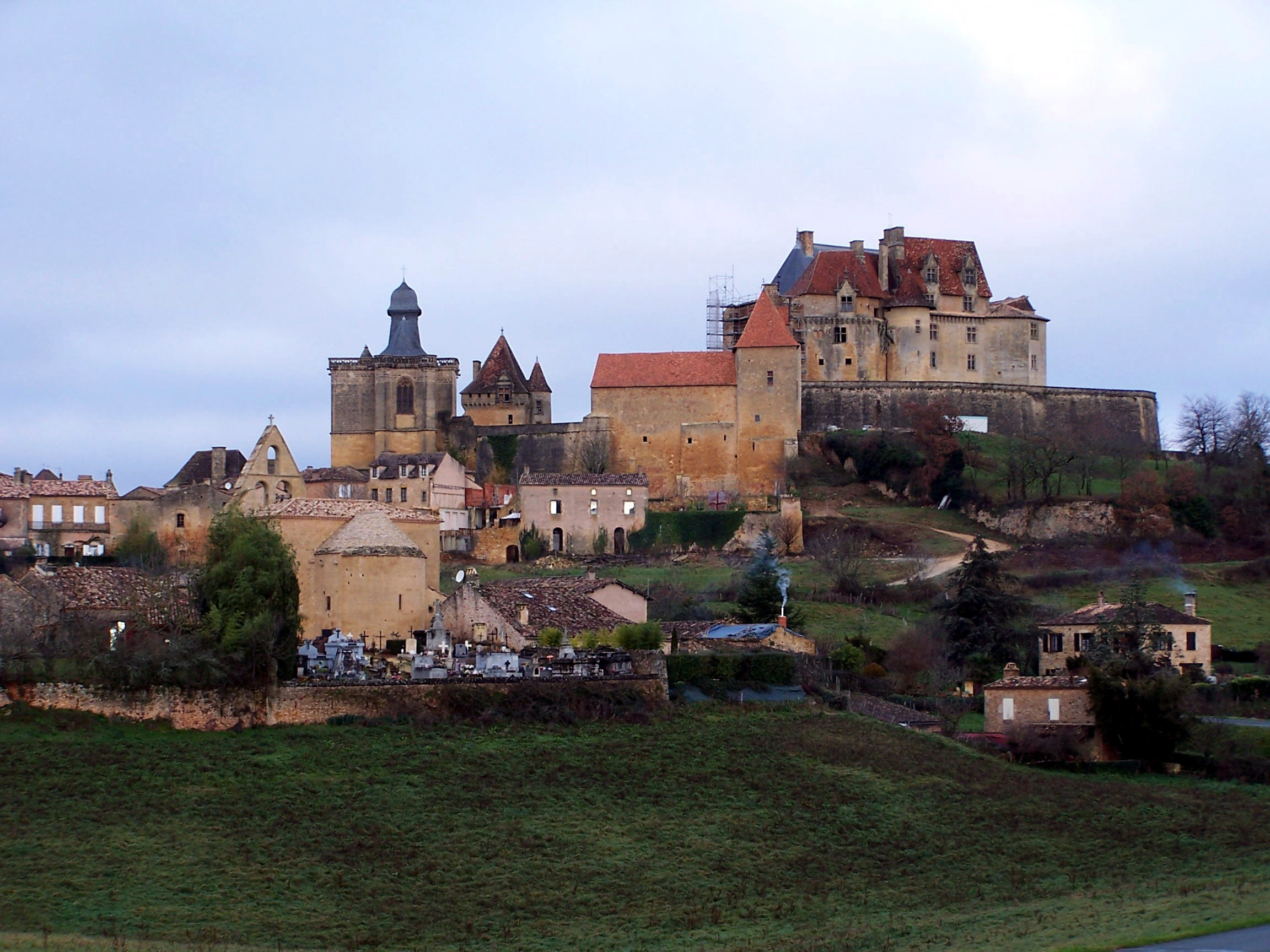
- A general view of Biron

- Coat of arms
- Location of Biron
- Location within France Location within Nouvelle-Aquitaine
- Coordinates: 44°37′54″N 0°52′23″E
- Country: France
- Region: Nouvelle-Aquitaine
- Department: Dordogne
- Arrondissement: Bergerac
- Canton: Lalinde

Government
  - Mayor (2020–2026): Bruno Desmaison
- Area^{1}: 12.98 km^{2} (5.01 sq mi)
- Elevation: 200 m (660 ft)
- Highest elevation: 240 m (790 ft)
- Lowest elevation: 128 m (420 ft)
- Population (2023): 151
  - Density: 11.6/km^{2} (30.1/sq mi)
- Time zone: UTC+01:00 (CET)
  - Summer (DST): UTC+02:00 (CEST)
- INSEE/Postal code: 24043 /24540
- ^{1} French Land Register data, which excludes lakes, ponds, glaciers > 1 km^{2} (0.386 sq mi or 247 acres) and river estuaries.

Biron (French pronunciation: [biʁɔ̃]; Occitan: Biront) is a commune in the Dordogne department in southwestern France.

== Geography ==
Biron lies between the Dropt and Lède rivers between the towns of Monpazier, Villeréal and Villefranche-du-Périgord.

== Population ==
Historical population
Year	Pop.	±% p.a.
1968	123	—
1975	121	−0.23%
1982	120	−0.12%
1990	132	+1.20%
1999	140	+0.66%
2007	178	+3.05%
2012	187	+0.99%
2017	162	−2.83%
2023	151	−1.17%
Source: INSEE

== Sights ==
Biron is dominated by the Château de Biron, which overlooks the village and was a bastion in medieval times. Today the château is a tourist hotspot in the summer months.

== See also ==
- Communes of the Dordogne département
- Le Monument vivant de Biron
