= Vision Forum (art organisation) =

Vision Forum is an organisation that carries out research in contemporary art and organises events that transgresses the boundaries between performance, exhibition, workshops and education. It grew from a series of events organised by Curatorial Mutiny in collaboration with KSM at Campus Norrköping, Linköping University in Sweden 2005–2007. Vision Forum took its present form in 2008. It does not have a physical location or a program, but responds to the needs of the group of artists, curators and researchers that are part of the network at any given moment. Its members are mostly based in Europe and have carried out projects all over the continent, in North America, Australia and Asia. In 2009, neuroscientist Stephen Whitmarsh joined the group, showing that the organisation can host members outside of the artistic community. A strategy that has been developed further in subsequent years.

== Workshops and public presentations ==
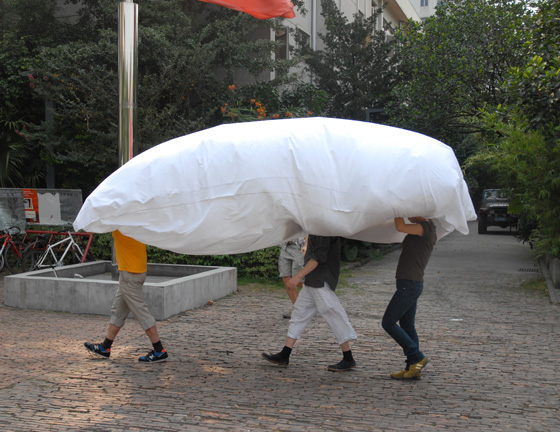
Yang Zhifei's performance in Beijing that was part of The Invisible Generation, 2009

In 2008–09, Vision Forum organised two major projects. (Anti)Realism brought together young contemporary visual artists based in Sweden, China, Great Britain, the Netherlands and France. The first part of the project was a practical workshop that took place in Guangzhou, China, in September 2008. The European participants developed collaborative projects with their Chinese peers that focused on time-based art.

”The title and the conceptual framework of the workshop (Anti)Realism was created to look into the differences and similarities of how we look at reality (both as individuals and as members of different cultures) and how that can be used to further our understanding and appreciation of life. The project allowed the participants to both understand differences between European cultures, as well as how these differ from Chinese contemporary art and life.”

The results of the workshop were presented to the public at Guangzhou Academy of Fine Art and a second were later developed into an exhibition which was shown at Verkstad in Sweden, Ècole Régional de Beaux Arts de Besaçon in France and at Adele C in Italy. Parallel to (Anti)Realism Vision Forum created four workshops in Rome, Zürich, Amsterdam, and Stockholm. These involved a completely different group of artists and curators from (Anti)Realism and focused on architecture, artistic production, curation and presentation respectively.

== Development of Nodes ==
Video stills of Dinu Li's performance on the Shenzhen Metro that was part of The Invisible Generation, November 2009.

In 2009–10, Vision Forum focused on four major projects or "nodes". They were each made up of a number of artists and curators who, like the Vision Forum workshops in 2008-09 met regularly. The nodes were held together by all doing research on time and temporality in different ways. "If you don’t want God, you’d better have a multiverse" was curated and developed by 1:1 Projects in Rome. The project was focused on workshops in Rome, Skopje and Paris. At the last meeting, the participants reformulated themselves into "OuUnPo" (Workshop for Alternative Universes), inspired by French literary group Oulipo. The participants organised a public event at MACRO in Rome and at Tate Britain in London in spring 2010 under the new name. Ouunpo has since then carried out events in Porto, Athens, Belgrade, Amsterdam-Nijmegen, Stockholm-Norrköping in collaboration with art and science institutions like Deste Foundation and Max Planck Institute. Australian artist duo A Constructed World started "Speech and What Archive?" which continued its activities in 2010–13. The node focused on alternative forms of communication and organised events in Paris, Nice, San Francisco and Melbourne working with art institutions like Villa Arson and CCA. Curator Claire Louise Staunton carried out research which later lead to the creation of the temporary gallery "Inheritance Shenzhen" in the Chinese region of Guangdong. This project was developed in Milton Keynes in 2011 with a large exhibition, seminar and publication. They then travelled to Chandigar and as an outcome of this research the node presented an exhibition about British architect Jane Drew and the artistic work that flourished around her at the Institute of Contemporary Art in London in 2014.

== The Invisible Generation ==
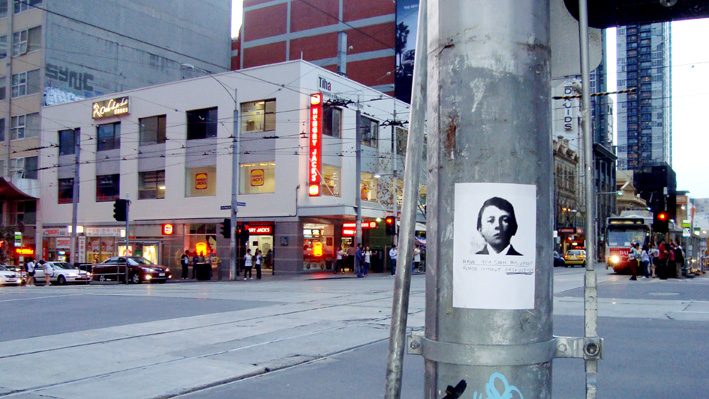
Installation view of poster project "Young Dictators" (Hitler as child), by Per Hüttner at public location in Melbourne, September 2009

The fourth major project realized in 2009–2010 was The Invisible Generation. It was conceived by artist Per Hüttner and Curator Daniele Balit and created new meeting places between art and its audiences. A great number of projects were realized in Melbourne, Shenzhen, Beijing and Kyiv in 2009–2010. For each city the program and artist list was totally new. No, project was ever repeated twice. The project always allowed the audience to meet art in new and unexpected situations and played with or confused the audiences’ expectations about what art is, where it normally appears and what shape it should take. In the introduction to the project in the catalogue Gerrie van Noord writes:

"The Invisible Generation is a collection of artistic interventions that spread virally across the continents of our globe. It used the artistic and curatorial network of Vision Forum as a platform to multiply and make its way into the perception of people in unexpected spaces of selected cities around the world. The project takes its starting point in performative traditions, but focuses on practices and events that cross over into other time-based activities such as sound, film, video, literature, theatre and workshops and draws inspiration from other related fields such as journalism, fashion and design, but also from those further removed like mathematics and physics"

== Redefining communication ==
Since September 2011 Vision Forum organizes two international workshops a year in Östergötland in Sweden. These bring together members of the different international nodes (in 2012 Vision Forum ran 10 nodes) and interact with local institutions and art organizations. This means that the research carried out in the individual nodes have started cross referencing and exchanging methodology between each other. Vision Forum, through its structure, develops modes of communication and knowledge production that make use of current technology. The nodes of the network also allow a deeper dialogue with their audiences that, in their turn, are inscribed into in numerous interconnected networks. It has become increasingly clear that the network focuses on research about how art uses, retains, distributes and develops knowledge along with how this can be fed back into the everyday lives of art's audience. This ties in with Vision Forum's founder Per Hüttner's work that can be exemplified by projects like I am a Curator, Democracy and Desire and (In)Visible Dialogues and have allowed them to participate in collective work in the Caribbean and in biennials in Brazil. The methodology builds on Deleuzian ideas about knowledge and creativity and has been developed in Vision Forum's nodes and networks, particularly in OuUnPo. This idea of exchange is based on co-producing knowledge with the collaborating institutions and audiences, rather than a top down knowledge distribution. The strategy that they call "collapsing the global with the local" is currently being developed by the network in collaboration with Global Art and the Museum at ZKM in Karlsruhe.

== Residency and Interdisciplinary Activities ==
In 2011 Vision Forum started publishing books and catalogues regularly to document its activities. The organisation also started to produce experimental films in a separate node called Vision Forum Film. Two films were in Production in 2012: "Effektivia" directed by Jesper Frilund and Marcus Fernstad and "The River" by Sino-Swedish director Ting Ting Yang (杨婷婷). In June 2013 Vision Forum opened an international residency program called "Norrköping Air." The program was initiated in collaboration with KSM at Linköping University, IASPIS and offers three artists the opportunity to work in parallel Sweden for 3 months during the Swedish summer months. The project focuses on experimental art in public spaces, drawing inspiration from the Invisible Generation and similar projects and was developed in close dialogue with the centenary of Norrköping Art Museum.

== Selected workshops ==
2017

- Native Foreigners, Museo Jumex, Mexico City in collaboration with Documenta 14 and De Appel
- EEGsynth and Brain Control Club at ICM in Paris
- What is Habit? Fullersta Gård, Huddinge.
- Riding the Donkey Backwards, Global Media Café: A Second Home: Mediating Borders and Hospitality, Stockholms universitet Stockholm.

2016

- Voices of Culture, Goethe Institut and the European Union, Brussels
- Brain Control Club, CRI, Paris
- Riding the Donkey Backwards, Fullersta Gård, Huddinge.
- The EEGSynth, EMS, Stockholm
- Riding the Donkey Backwards, Stockholm and Antwerp.
- BrainHack, Ecole Normale Superieur, Paris

2015

- OuUnPo Sweden, The Fugue, Bonniers konsthall, Hallwylska Museet, IASPIS etc., Stockholm
- Unfold at the Stedelijk Museum, Amsterdam, the Netherlands
- Performing Objects, Enough Room for Space, Brussels, Belgium
- The EEGSynth, Frankfurt University Hospital, Frankfurt Germany and Champagne, France
- The Disembodied Voice, workshop in private and public spaces in London

2014

- We Are what We Have Lost, OuUnPo São Paulo, MAM, Pinacoteca, Videobrasil etc.
- OuUnPoeïses, Fondazione Orestiadi and CRESM, Nuova Gibellina, Sicilien, Italien
- All the Worlds that you Word, GAM at ZKM i Karlsruhe, Tyskland

2013

- Volume, 98weeks, Assabil Libraries, The National Library Archive etc., Beirut, Lebanon
- Is Misunderstanding Misunderstood, 3rd Ghetto Bienniale, Port-au-Prince, Haiti
- OuUnPo Japan, Godzilla and the Phoenix, Mori Art Museum, Spiral, Bankart 1929 and many more venues in Tokyo and Yokohama.
- Temporality and Dis-Location of Self, four workshops in around Stockholm, Botkyrka konsthall, Hallwylska palatset and various public locations.

2012

- OuUnPo Lebanon "QUANTUM FLUCTUATIONS OF A SYNECDOCHIC UNIVERSE", Ashkal Alwan, Beirut Art Center, 98Weeks, Musée National de Beyrouth, UMAM Research and Documentation Centre and Batroun Projects.
- Ouunpo-rto, Culturgest, Casa de Musica, Fundação Serralves and other institutions in Porto, Portugal.
- Think Again, Mingshen Museum, Rockbund Art Museum, FCAC, 2666 Library, Shanghai, China.
- Time Capsules and Conditions of Now, David Roberts Art Foundation, London, UK

2011

- Ouunpo Greece "Orality", Deste Foundation, Six Dogs and public venues, Athens Greece
- Community without Propinquity (curated by Claire Louise Staunton), MK Gallery, Milton Keynes, UK.
- Vision Forum Autumn Meeting 2011 Arbetets Museum, Norrköpings konstmuseum etc., Sweden
- (In)Visible Dialogues, curated by Lena Boëthius, Konstakademien, Stockholm, Sweden.
- Ouunpo Serbia "Urgency and Leisure", Tesla Museum, Museum of Serbian History etc. Belgrade, Serbia.

2010

- Ouunpo UK "Ponder Pause Process (a Situation)", Tate Britain, London, UK
- Ouunpo Italy, MACRO, Rome, Italy
- In the Limbo of the Signifier: Workshop on Linear Logic, Ars Longa, Paris, France

2009

- New Creation Musée du temps, Besançon, France
- The Stockholm Syndrome, Kungliga Konsthögskolan, Stockholm, Sweden.

2008

- If you don't want God, you'd better have a multiverse, Press to Exit, Skopje, Macedonia
- If you don't want God, you'd better have a multiverse, 1:1 Projects, Rome, Italy
- Vision Forum, White Space, Zürich, Switzerland
- Vision Forum, Amsterdam, the Netherlands
- (Anti)Realism, The Academy of Fine Arts, Guangzhou, China

== Selected exhibitions, performances and projects ==
2017

- Native Foreigners, Museo Jumex, Mexico City in collaboration with med Documenta 14 and De Appel
- Local Minima, Fullersta Gård, Huddinge.
- Start in the Middle, Performance at AlbumArte, Rome and Galleri Fagerstedt, Stockholm
- 1 +1=3, Rönnells antikvariart, Stockholm

2016

- Untitled Performance, with 1 +1=3 with Marcos Lutyens, 5 Car Garage, Los Angeles, USA
- Ohio Impromptu Revamped, with 1 +1=3, A Ship in the Woods, San Diego, USA
- Untitled Performance, 1 +1=3, with The Science of Consciousness, The University of Arizona, Tucson, USA

2015

- OuUnPo Sweden, The Fugue, Bonniers konsthall, Hallwylska Museet, IASPIS etc., Stockholm
- What is Potential? Wellcome Collection Reading Room, London, UK
- V8skan, The Nobel museum, Stockholm
- Assured Stability, V Art Center, Shanghai, China

2014

- We Are what We Have Lost, OuUnPo São Paulo, MAM, Pinacoteca, Videobrasil etc.
- OuUnPoeïses, Fondazione Orestiadi and CRESM, Nuova Gibellina, Sicily, Italy
- Poseidon will Recreate Lake Texcoco, Alam + Petrov och Villa Punk, Mexico City in collaboration with the City of Mexico City and the Embassy of Sweden.

2013

- Is Misunderstanding Misunderstood, 3rd Ghetto Bienniale, Port-au-Prince, Haiti
- OuUnPo Japan, Godzilla and the Phoenix, Mori Art Museum, Spiral, Bankart 1929 and other venues in Tokyo and Yokohama.

2012

- Think Again, Mingshen Museum and FCAC, Shanghai, China.
- The Entremet, The Museum of Contemporary Art Les Abattoirs, Toulouse, France
- Speech and What Archive, Convivio, Micro Onde, Centre for Contemporary Art, l'Onde, Vélizy-Villacoublay, France
- Time Capsules and Conditions of Now, Curated by Fatos Ustek, David Roberts Art Foundation, London, UK* Time Capsules and Conditions of Now, Curated by Fatos Ustek, David Roberts Art Foundation, London, UK
- Speech and What Archive, A Floating Conversation, performance, CNEAI, Paris, France

2011

- Community without Propinquity (curated by Claire Louise Staunton), MK Gallery, Milton Keynes, UK
- Speech and What archive, Medicine Show Rotterdam, Paola Pivi's GRRR JAMMING SQUEEK, Rotterdam, the Netherlands
- (In)Visible Dialogues, curated by Lena Boëthius, Konstakademien, Stockholm, Sweden
- Quantum Police, curated by Anne Klontz, Valerie Lambert Gallery, Brussels; DKTUS Stockholm and Putting Out the Fire with Gasoline, Manufactura's Studio, Wuhan

2010

- This Image Is No More, GOOD TV, Wu Dao Ying Hu Tong, Beijing, China.
- Dynasty, Pauline Curnier Jardin, Musée d'Art Moderne de la Ville de Paris and Palais de Tokyo, Paris.
- The Invisible Generation, Les Kurbas Center, Kyiv, Ukraine.
- Simultaneity, Curated by Anne Klontz, Rumänska kulturinstitutet, Stockholm and Platform China, Beijing.
- The Invisible Generation, Ullens Center for Contemporary Art (with Yan Jun)
- Imminent

2009

- The Invisible Generation, OCAT, Shenzhen, China
- News for Tomorrow, Yan Jun, Beijing, China (With Birdcage, Paris)
- The Invisible Generation, VCA Margaret Lawrence Gallery, Melbourne
- Do not Go Gentle ERBA and Musée du temps, Besançon, France"
- Calabi-Yau Presents, Gerlesborgsskolan, Sweden; FACT, Liverpool and VCA Margaret Lawrence Gallery, Melbourne (3 parallel exhibitions in 3 countries).
- INH-SZ Temporary Project Space, Shenzhen. Exhibitions, film programme, lecture series including Chu Yun, Guy Delisle, Christian Jankowski, Daniel Knorr, Liu Chuang, Map Office, Yang Yong. Directed by Claire Louise Staunton, Inheritance Projects Sign in to your account

2008

- (Anti)Realism, Norrköpings konsthall, Norrköping, Sweden, ERBA Besançon, France and Adele C, Rome, Italy
- Vision Forum, 1:1 Projects and Lift gallery, Rom, Italy.

2007

- Privé och Publico, Galleri 54, Göteborg, Sweden (as Curatorial Mutiny)
- Private Parts, Museet för glömska, Norrköping, Sweden (as Curatorial Mutiny)

2005

- Participate? Basekamp, Philadelphia, USA (as Curatorial Mutiny)
- Participate? Chinese European Art Center, Xiamen, China (as Curatorial Mutiny)

== Publications ==
- Cartels, Laurent Deveze, design by Jerome Vaspard, Language: French. ISBN 978-91-984270-4-2
- Friends and Strangers, Per Huttner and Åbäke, Language: English ISBN 978-91-984270-3-5
- Governing Bodies – A Reader on Microbes, Art & Identity. Edited by Freddie Ross. Language: English.ISBN 978-91-984270-2-8
- Grymhetens konst (Cruelty’s Art), Freddie Ross, Language: Swedish. ISBN 978-91-984270-1-1
- Whispering Catastrophe On the Language of Men Loving Men in Japan, Jacopo Miliani and Sara Giannini. ISBN 978-91-984270-0-4
- Mörkrets Geografi (Geography of Darkness), Anna Berglind, Language: Swedish. ISBN 978-91-980725-9-4
- Barnstugan (The Kindergarten), Mattias Åkesson, Language: Swedish. ISBN 978-91-9807258-7
- Ö- A Möbius Trip, Edited by Isabel Löfgren and Per Hüttner, design by Erik Månsson. Language: English. ISBN 978-91-980725-4-9
- Verkstad: Rum För Konst, Edited by Susanne Ewerlöf and Erik Månsson, design by Erik Månsson. Language: Swedish. ISBN 978-91-980725-7-0
- March 8 - August 30, Temporality and Dislocation, Edited by Anders Paulin. Language: English. ISBN 978-91-980725-2-5.
- Sond – Spelens värld är större än spelvärlden edited by Niclas Fasth. Illustrations by William Sulka and design by Erik Månsson. Language: Swedish. ISBN 978-91-980725-5-6.
- OuUnPo[RTO], edited by Claudia Squitieri and Samon Takahashi, texts by OuUnPo, designed by Åbäke published by Dent-de-Leone and Vision Forum, 2013.
- Think Again, edited by Rudi Heinrichsen. Designed by Guo Xingling and published with Fei Art Center. Language: English and Chinese. ISBN 978-91-980725-0-1.
- Vision Forum Film, edited by Rudi Heinrichsen, translated by Yan Rong and designed by Erik Månsson. Texts by Rudi Heinrichsen, Per Hüttner, Yang Tingting, Jesper Frilund and Rebecca Catching. published by Vision Forum, 2013. ISBN 978-91-978934-8-0.
- Anthology for Eskapism, edited by Acéphale for event at Göteborgs Konsthall 2013. Contributing artists and writers: Susanna Lundqvist, Acéphale, Rebecca Eskilsson, Sophie Mörner, Tereza Zelenkova, Ragnar Persson, Jonas Liveröd, Gertrud Sandqvist, Andreas Kittel, Nadine Byrne, Lina Hagelbäck, Leonora Carrington and Astrid Kruse Jensen. Design by Erik Månsson, 2013. ISBN 978-91-980725-1-8.
- Time Capsules and Conditions of Now, Curated by Fatos Ustek, David Roberts Art Foundation, London, UK and Vision Forum 2012, ISBN 978-91-978934-6-6.
- The Quantum Police, with texts by Anne Klontz; Johnny Ross and Willie Hansen (1969) and a short story by Wang Xiao Ping (in Chinese and English). Design by Erik Månsson, 96 pages in full colour + 5 fold-out sheets. Published by Lambert Gallery and Vision Forum 2011, ISBN 978-91-978934-5-9.
- SWANewspaper, 16 pages, colour, edited by Anna Hess et al. (Speech and What Archive). Published by A Constructed World 2011.
- TRAVELS, 2011, edited by: Louise Nilsson and Lisa Boström, graphic design Karl dos Santos, Language English, contributions by: Hu Fang, Lillian Fellman, Marie Husson, Per Hüttner, Louise Höjer, Mako Ishizuka, Anna Kleberg, Björn Kusoffsky, Niklas Lundell, Isin Onol and Alessandra Sandrolini.
- (In)visible Dialogues, 2011, Edited by Per Hüttner and Elias Arnér, languages: English and Swedish, 240 pages, design by Åbäke. Published by Dent-de-Leone. ISBN 978-91-978934-3-5 and ISBN 978-0-9561885-5-7
- The Invisible Generation, 2011, 144 pages. Texts by Gerrie van Noord, Daniele Balit, Olav Westphalen and Per Hüttner. Language: English. Design by Marie. Published by Curatorial Mutiny and Vision Forum. ISBN 978-91-978934-2-8
- The Imminent Interviews, 2010, 90 pages, languages: English and Chinese, published by Fei Contemporary Art Center, Shanghai and Vision Forum 2010, ISBN 978-91-978934-4-2
- Salone D'alone, Pauline Curnier Jardin, Vinyl record with booklet. Published by Vision Forum and Musée d'Art Moderne de la Ville de Paris and Palais de Tokyo, Paris, 2010
