= The Invisible Generation =

Art project

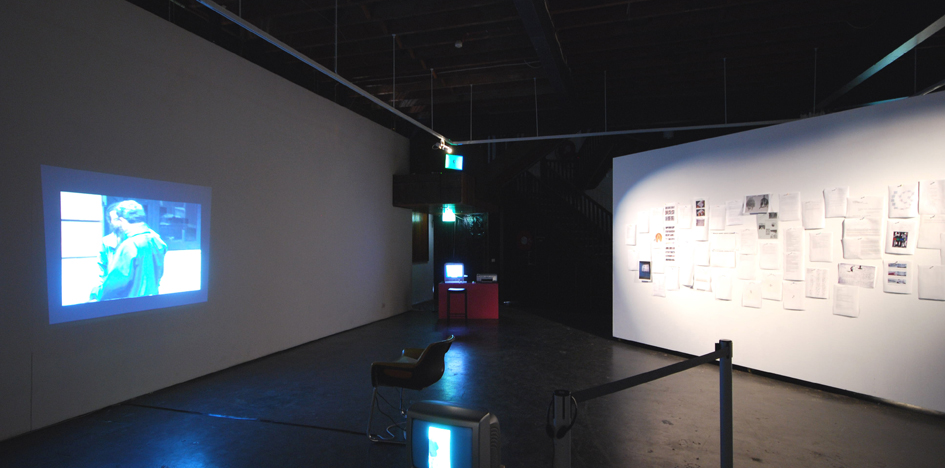
Installation view of The Anti Hospital designed by Greatest Hits at The Margaret Lawrence Gallery in Melbourne, September 2009.

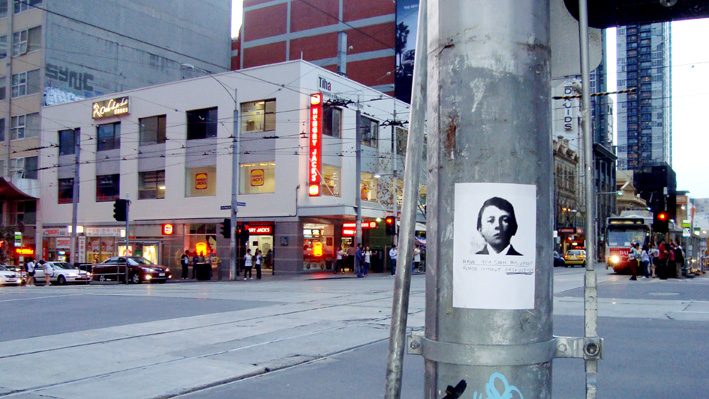
Installation view of poster project “Young Dictators” (Hitler as child), by Per Hüttner at public location in Melbourne, September 2009.

The Invisible Generation was a contemporary art project conceived by artist Per Hüttner and curator Daniele Balit and organized by Vision Forum and created new meeting places between art and its audiences. A great number of projects were realized in Melbourne, Shenzhen, Beijing and Kyiv in 2009-2010. For each city the program and artist list was totally new. No project was ever repeated. The project always allowed the audience to meet art in new and unexpected situations and played with or confused the audiences' expectations about what art is, where it normally appears and what shape it should take.

Most projects were realized in contexts where the audience does not necessarily expect to find artwork. In the metro (Dinu Li, Per Hüttner), in a newspaper office (Yan Jun), on a public square (Natasha Rosling) or even contained as a story in the mind of a person in a shop (Good TV). In other instances the project played with the perceived immutability of the artwork. The audience was asked to actively create or re-create artwork (The Anti-Hospital), remove or destroy drawings (Jean-François Robardet), bring books to be changed (Private Contractors) or in some cases it was disguised as an informative poster, graffiti or political propaganda (Huang Xiaopeng, Per Hüttner).

The inspiration and title is taken from a text by William S. Burroughs where he describes a series of situations where a tape recorder is used to create new forms of meetings between people and new forms of engagement with the media.

== Melbourne, September 2009 ==
The first part of The Invisible Generation opened to the public in Australia in September 2009. The presentation was co-curated by Hüttner and Balit. It was introduced at the Margaret Lawrence Gallery which was also the starting point for a number of interventions in the public space of the city. In the gallery were two major installations presented: Do Not Go Gentle Court by Per Hüttner and Polka Dot by French artist Mark Geffriaud. The two works redefine the gallery experience through reflections on the fabric of space and time. Being situated at the boundaries between installation and performance, they delineated a space that was the starting point for the Anti-Hospital, an open-ended and evolving platform which formed the core of the project. The Anti-Hospital was designed by Melbourne-based collective Greatest Hits and focused around a collection of artistic documents providing instructions that were formulated as possible actions, performances, temporary artworks, objects and social situations, scores and sonic interventions proposed by absent artists and realized by local artists, non-artists and visitors to the gallery. Greatest Hits created a dozen videos that enacted, played with and read out the instructions and together created a sort of manual to aid and inspire the visitor to relate to them. Many instructions were interpreted, primarily by local artists while the exhibition was open to the public.

For the period of the exhibition the Anti-Hospital also coordinated a series of events, performances, actions, workshops and ways of disseminating the instructions through the media and the urban space of Melbourne including, local artists, students and a program on the screen and LEDs at Federation Square. This included the controversial project “Young Dictators” conceived and realized by Per Hüttner with two local students. The three put up 2000 copies of A4 sized posters around the city showing images of dictators such as Adolf Hitler, Saddam Hussein and Joseph Stalin as children with the text “Have you seen this child? Please contact 0432 027 925” (Hüttner’s mobile number)

Video stills of Dinu Li's performance on the Shenzhen Metro that was part of The Invisible Generation, November 2009.

== Shenzhen October 2009 ==
Where the presentation in Melbourne focused on the relationship between suspended instructions in the gallery and interventions in the public space, the project in Shenzhen consisted mostly of unannounced performances in the public space and hosted by the contemporary art museum OCAT. The shift in political, economic, social and architectural context also meant the dynamics of the project changed greatly and made the participation of the local audience more difficult to achieve, but all the more successful on the occasions where it happened. Presentations included carnivalesque costumes appearing in public space as temporary and wearable architectural elements by Natasha Rosling. Yang Zhifei carried a giant white pillow through the streets of the city and she let an army of people sleep in public spaces, each with a normally sized pillow under their head. She also organized a dream workshop to compare the dreams of the Chinese with those of the Dutch. Dinu Li created a choreography of corruption and guilt on the Shenzhen underground provoking fear in the audience and laying bare how deep inside the psyches of its citizens a totalitarian government can reach. Neno Belchev designed a portable zebra crossing to facilitate jaywalking, a passion shared by the Chinese and Bulgarians.

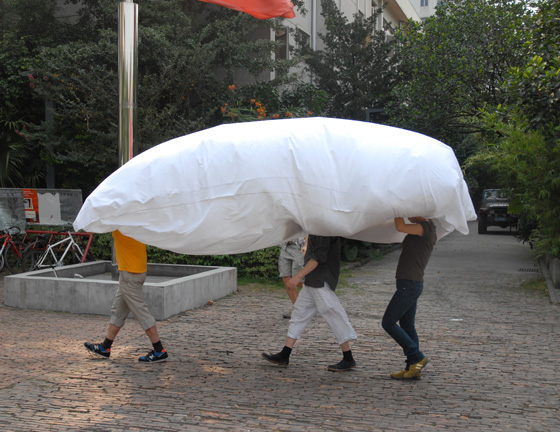
Yang Zhifei's performance in Beijing that was part of The Invisible Generation, October 2009.

== Beijing July 2009 – July 2010 ==
The events in Beijing took place over a whole year and culminated in a large presentation at Ullens Center for Contemporary Art in June 2010 Presentations kicked off with summer 2009 with Jon Phillips and Matt Hope’s speaker event "Laoban Sound System" in conjunction with Ai Weiwei’s day without internet. The two has since launched a range of events in Beijing, Shanghai and Hong Kong. Other events included Yan Jun’s sonic material slipped into the desk drawers at Beijing Youth Weekly editorial office and interviews from the same newspaper that were replayed and perverted over 6 weeks. Good TV collected memories of images that had been lost for different reasons. collection of lost images retold by storytellers in their everyday life in the Wudaoying Hutong (五道营胡同). The Beijing context and the proximity to the centre of political power allowed “This Image Is No More” to develop another layer of interpretation which had been lacking in its realization in Europe. Both Natasha Rosling and Yang Zhifei created versions of their projects from Shenzhen in Beijing. Especially the giant white pillow carried through the streets the Chinese capital to mirrored its grandiose buildings in ways that also inspired interesting reactions among the unassuming audience.

== Kyiv, November 2009 and July 2010 ==
In November Yulia Usova and PAI organised a series of talks in Kyiv that approached issues such as curation and art in public spaces and included speakers such as Olesya Turkina, Olav Westphalen and Karen MacDonald. In conjunction with this a group of students from Kungliga Konsthögskolan in Stockholm made a series of improvised performances at Les Kurbas' Theater Center. A large part of the project took place during the swine flu epidemic in Ukraine all public theatre events were stopped and schools closed giving the whole event a very special flavour.

The actual project was scheduled to be realized in April 2010, but had to be cancelled due to the volcanic ash cloud that prevented air travel in Europe at the given time and only web-performances were undertaken. The project was realized 19 June and 2–4 July 2010 and was co-curated by Per Hüttner and Yulia Usova. The project saw a meeting between artists from China, Western Europe and Ukraine. Rumours claim that artists met with great problems with local authorities including arrests, theft by undercover policemen and that the artists had to bribe officials to be able to leave the country.

== Documentation and talks ==
Since most of the events in The Invisible Generation only had an unexpecting audience, the organizers present the documentation of the project in various art institutions around the world, including UCCA in Beijing and Norrköpings Konstmuseum in Sweden. Vision Forum has also published an extensive catalogue about The Invisible Generation in 2011. It was edited by Gerrie van Noord and includes all the original instructions presented in Melbourne. The publication also contains texts by Daniele Balit, Per Hüttner, Olav Westphalen and incidentally contains a reproduction of this page. The book is framed by three texts by the editor, Gerrie van Noord where she reflects on the difficulty and necessity of mediating ephemeral projects like The Invisible Generation.

== Participating artists in The Invisible Generation archive of instructions ==
A Constructed World, Åsa Ersmark, Anna Scalfi, Carlo Steiner, Chen Wei, Chi Wo Leung, Christophe Bruno, Dinu Li, Etienne Cliquet, Gerrie van Noord, Hristina Ivanoska, Jean-Francois Robardet, Karen MacDonald, Kent Hanssen, Kylie Wilkinson, Natalia Kamia, Natalie Thomas, Pauline Curnier Jardin, Per Hüttner, Riccardo Benassi, Rik Bas Backer, Samon Takahashi, Seth Cluett, Veronica Kent and Sean Peoples, Yan Jun, James Webb, The Grossi Maglioni Magic Duo, Harriet Kate Morgan/Joint Hassles, USERNAME and Jon Phillips.

The following people have also participated in the various programs and events of the TIG in Melbourne: Amy Johannes, Kay Abude, Laura Whitfield, Ann Fuata, Jethro Harcourt, Lisa Imai, Alesh Macak, Pip Ryan, Sherry McLane Alejos, Kellie Wells, Nick Tammens, Sarah Haywood, Natalie Thomas, Kylie Wilkinson, Alex Rizkalla and Julie Davies.
