= Per Hüttner =

Swedish visual artist

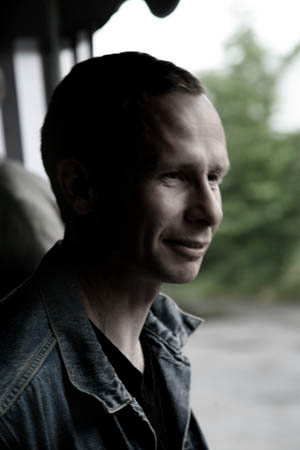
- Per Hüttner in Copenhagen 2007
- Born: 11 February 1967; Oskarshamn, Sweden
- Education: Konsthögskolan Stockholm, Hochschule der Künste Berlin
- Known for: Installation art, photography, drawing, performance art, writing and curation
- Movement: Conceptual Art
- Awards: Maria Bonnier Dahlins Stiftelse, IASPIS, Konstakademien Stockholm

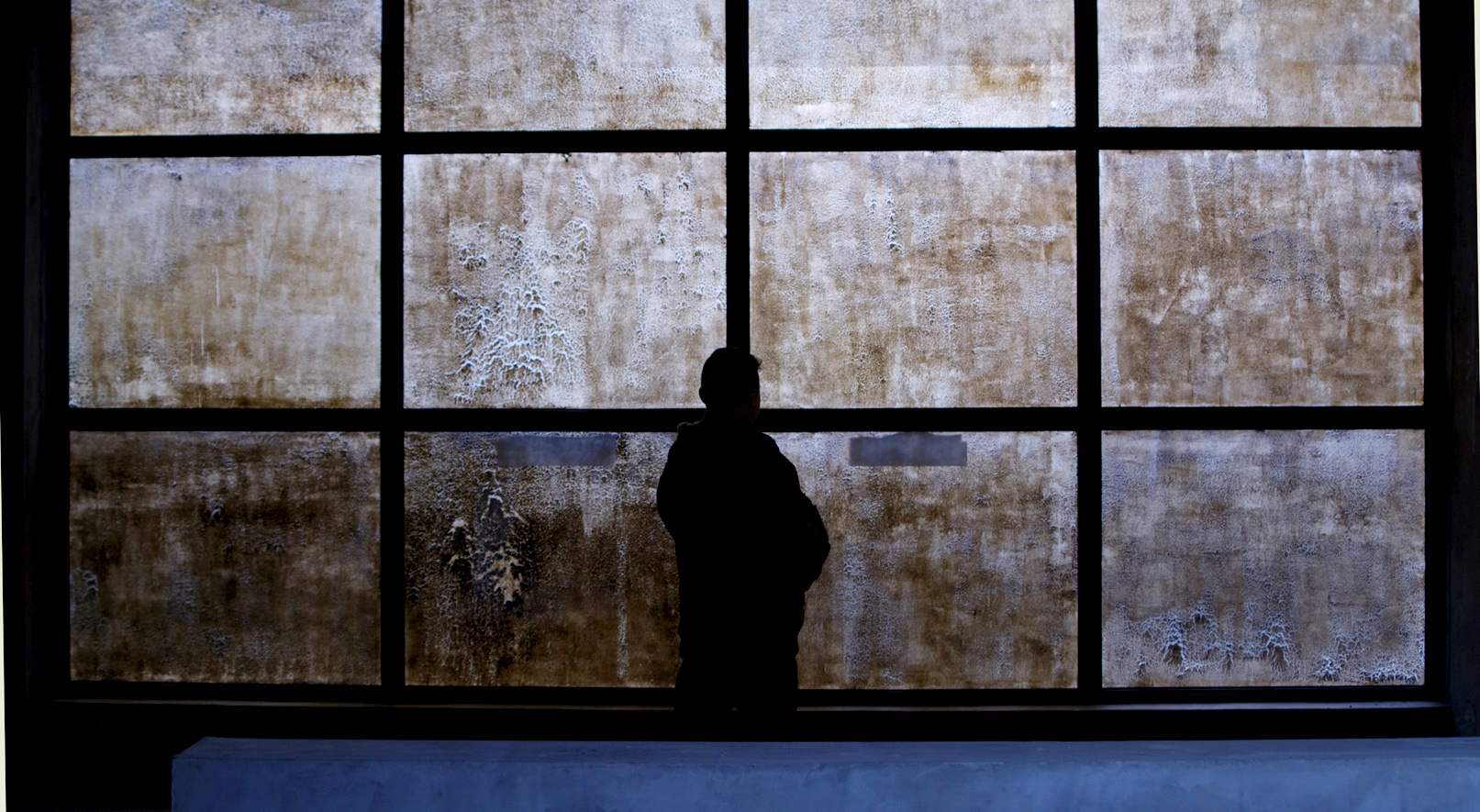
Putting Out the Fire with Gasoline, Used motor oil and chicken blood tempera on window, 2011

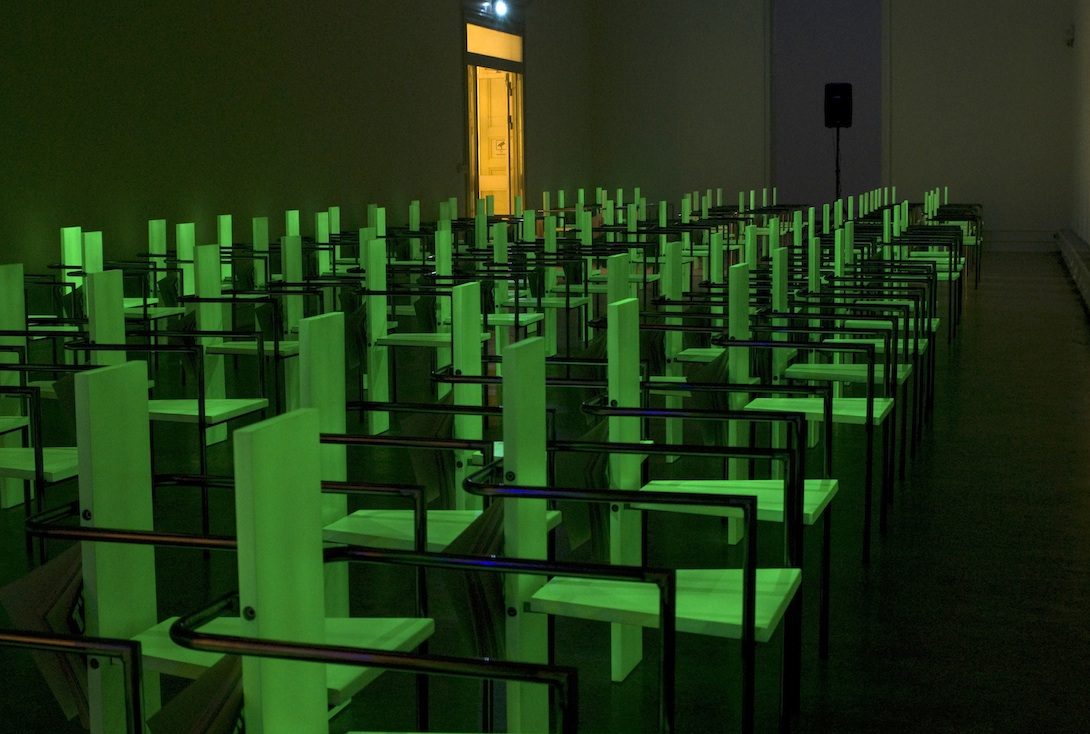
(In)Visible Dialogues, 2011, phosphorescent copies of J. Bolin's Chairs with catalogue, created by Abake (night)

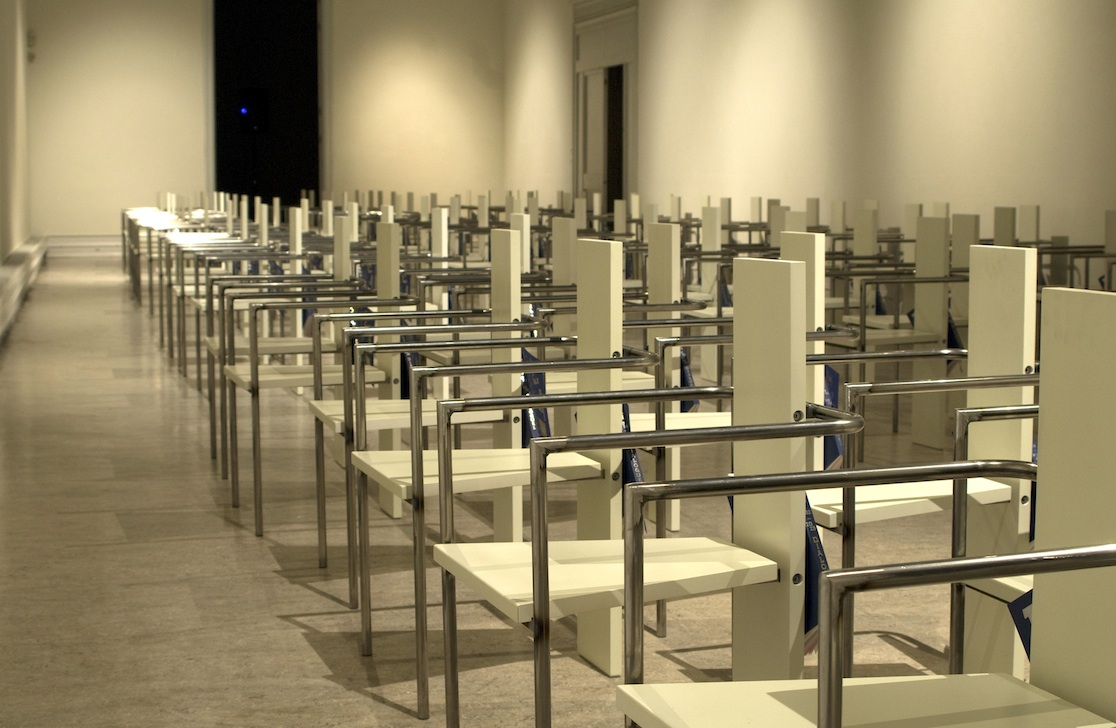
(In)Visible Dialogues, phosphorescent copies of J. Bohlin's Chairs with catalogue, created by Abake 2011 (day)

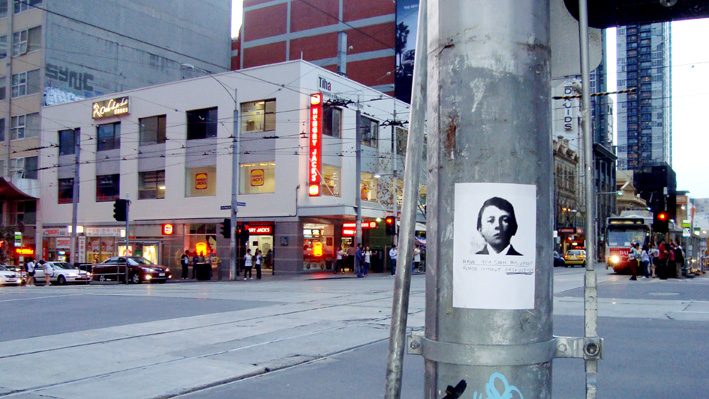
Installation view of poster project "Young Dictators" (Hitler as child), by Per Hüttner at public location in Melbourne, September 2009.

Per Hüttner (born 11 February 1967) is a Swedish visual artist who lives and works in Paris. He is mostly known for his photographic work and for his interactive, changing and travelling exhibition projects. A number of monographs about his practice has been published including Per Hüttner, 2003; I am a Curator, 2004; Repetitive Time 2006, Xiao Yao You2006, Democracy and Desire 2007. The Imminent Interviews 2010 and The Quantum Police 2011.

== Biography ==
Hüttner was born in Oskarshamn, Småland on 11 February 1967. His father Bengt, who was Jewish, died in a car accident in 1971 and he was brought up by his Protestant mother with his sister. He moved around Sweden until the age of 24 when he moved to Berlin to study. He studied at Hochschule der Künste in Berlin 1991 to 1992. He graduated from Konsthögskolan in Stockholm 1993.

His life has since been marked by nomadism and constant movement where travel and international dialogues are core to his life and practice. He lived in London and Los Angeles until he created his base in Paris in 2002. Hüttner was one of the founders of the non-profit galleries Konstakuten in Stockholm (1996–2001) and The Hood Gallery in Los Angeles (2001–2003), the former was one of the first artist initiated galleries in the country and was important in creating a culture of self-organisation of artists in Sweden. He is also one of the founders of the residency programs Norrköping AIR and initiator of the experimental research group Vision Forum.

== Works ==
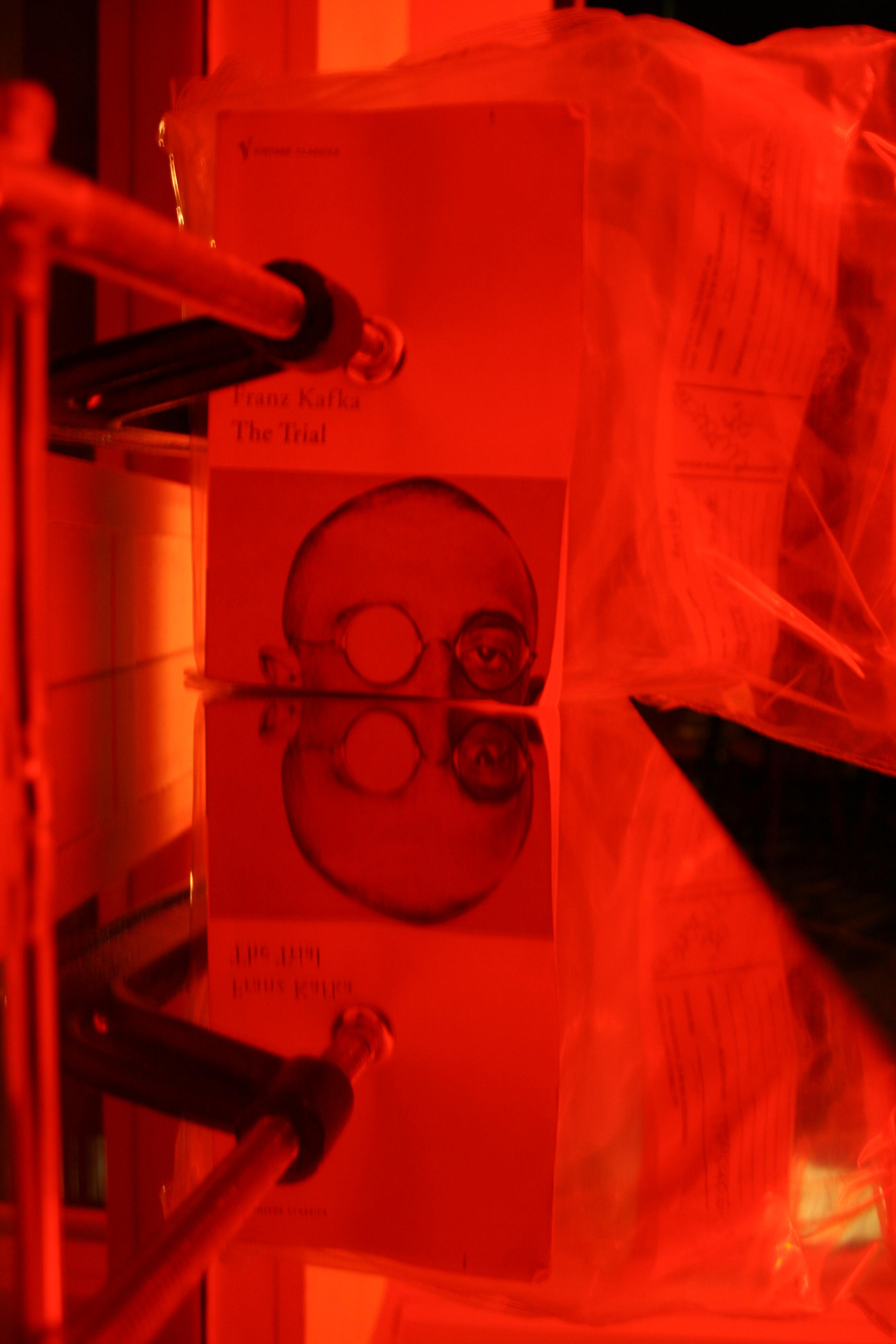
Quantum Police Installation, 2011 Installation at Cartel, London, Chinese and English copy of Franz Kafka's "The Trial", clamp and forensic evidence and mirror.

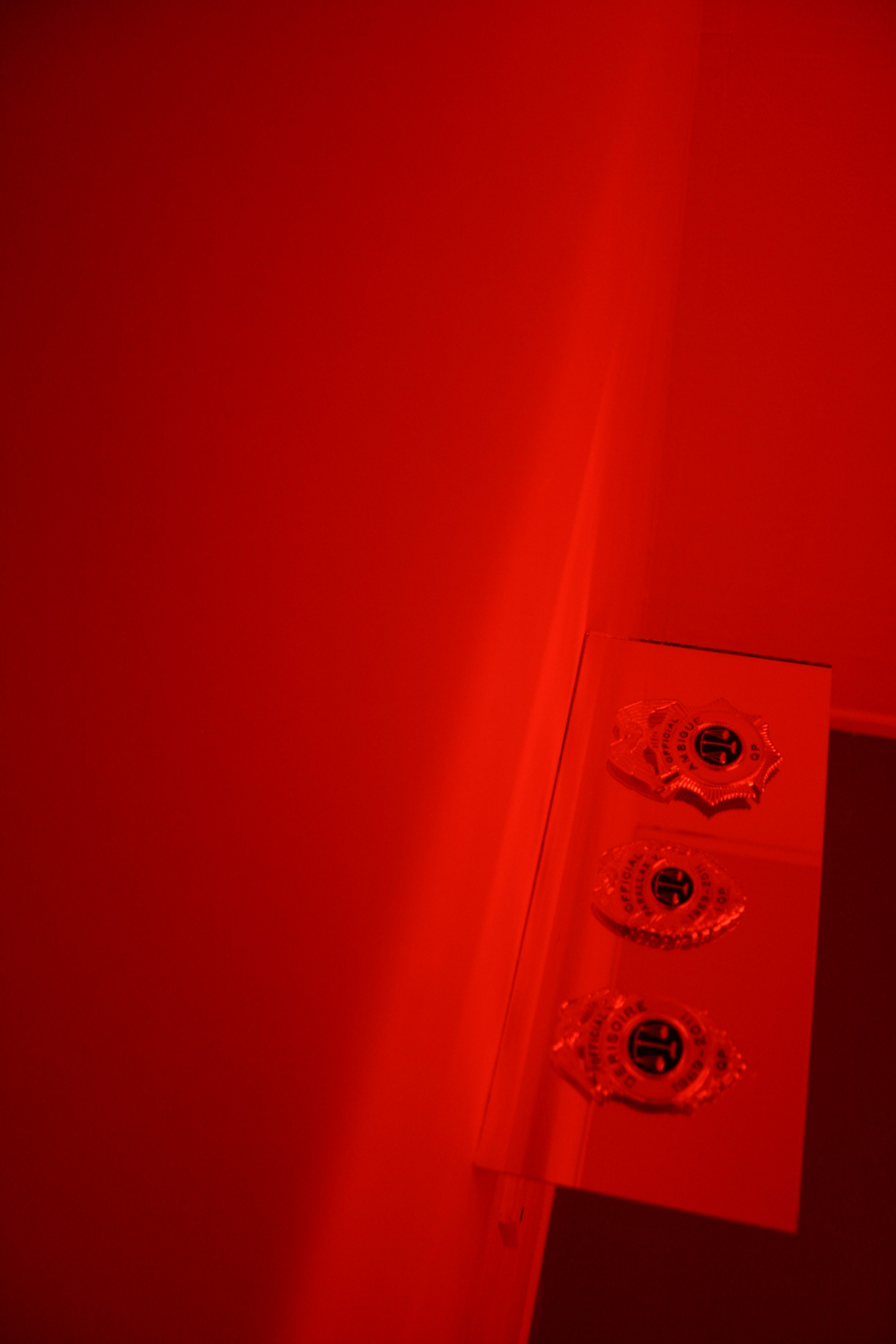
Quantum Police Installation, 2011 Installation at Cartel, London, Police badges and mirror

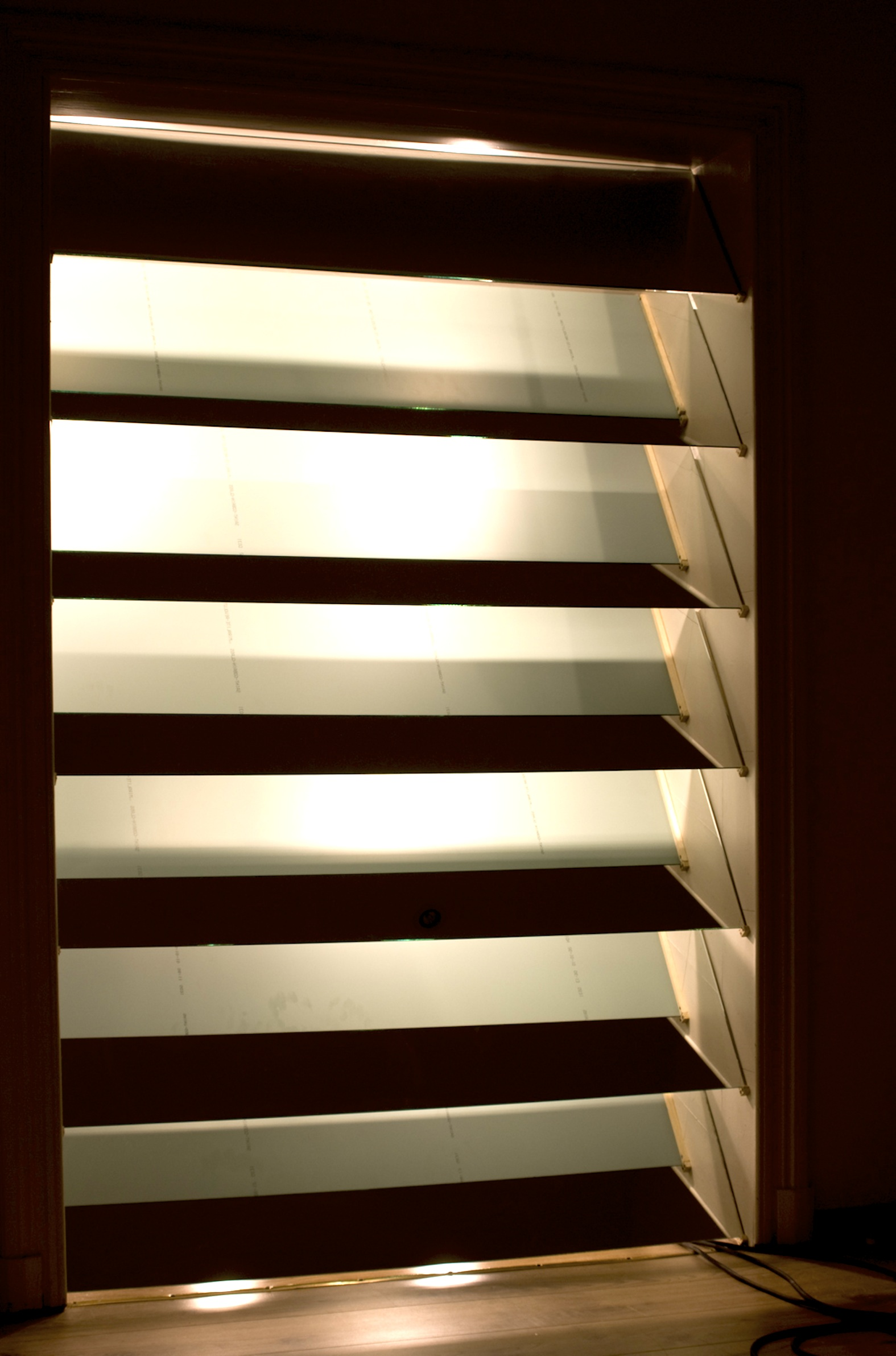
Quantum Police, 2011 Installation at Lambert Gallery, mirrors and halogen lamps.

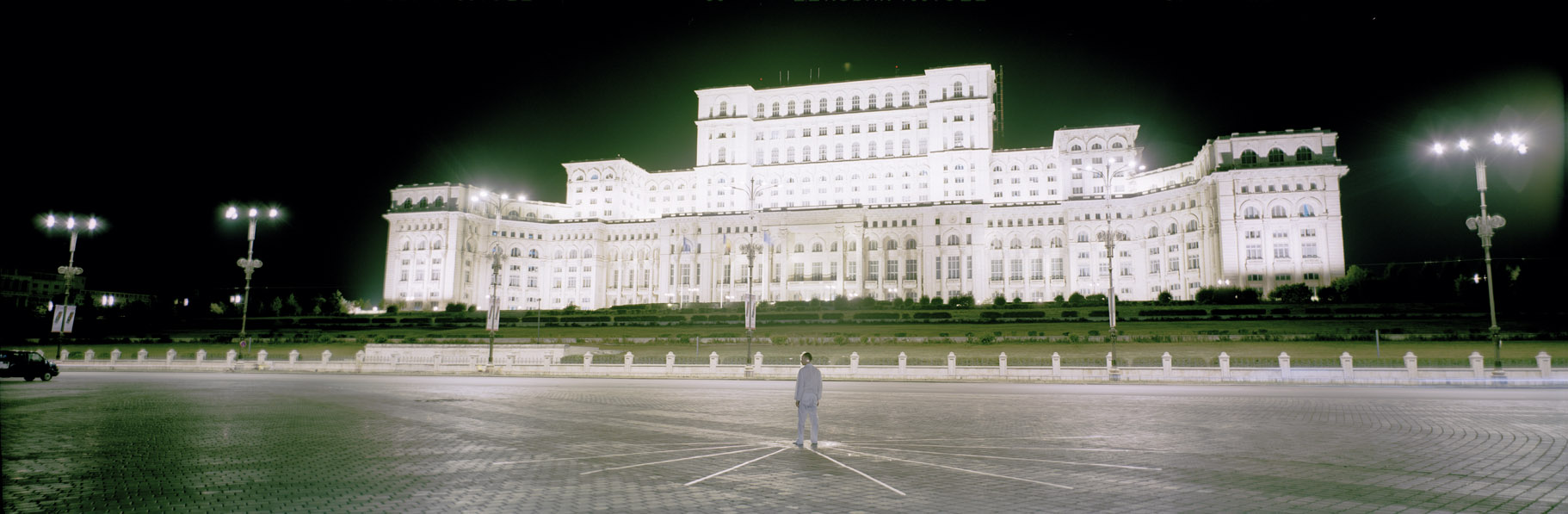
Rebirth (Bucharest), 2006 Framed Colour Photograph Mounted on Dibond

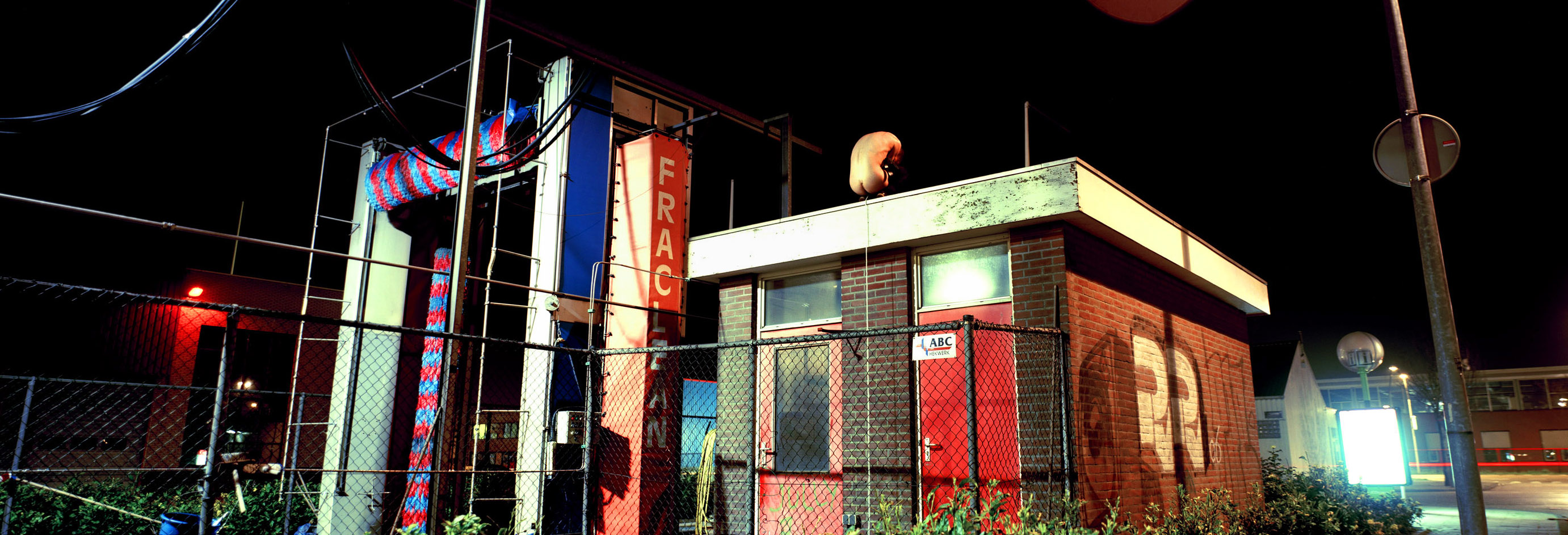
Catharis (Amsterdam), 2007 Framed Colour Photograph Mounted on Dibond

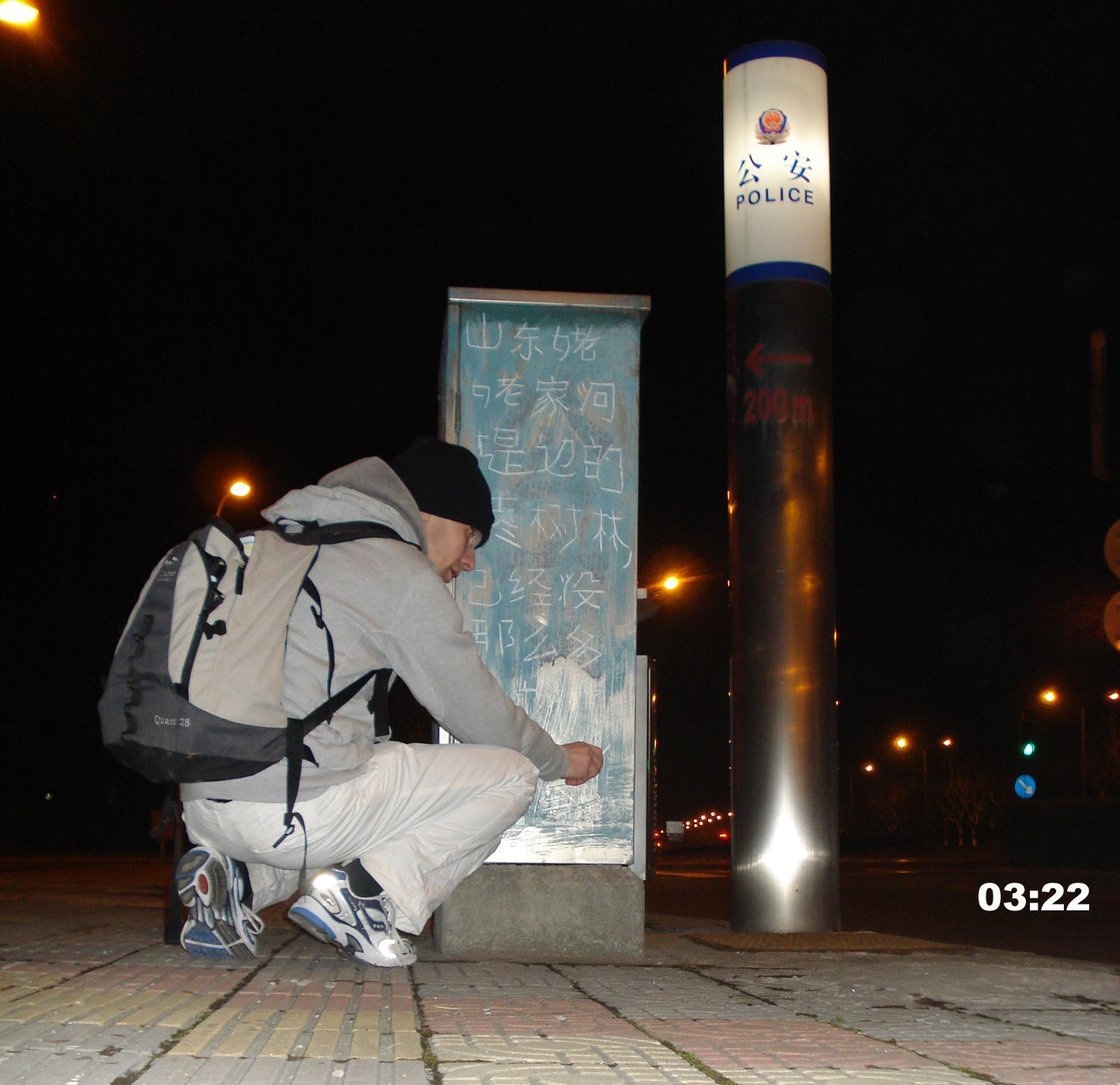
Filling the City with Dreams, 2008 Performance documentation from Zendai MOMA, Shanghai, February 28, 2008.

Hüttner's work investigates impermanence as a global principle, especially how ideas of permanence and purity are used to perpetuate social, political and economical structures and how that influences human communication and interaction. The work often deals with transformation, change or various forms of transgressions of boundaries or borders. The artist is inspired by French philosopher Gilles Deleuze and particularly interested in how the relationship between larger political, economical and social structures affect the individual and vice versa. His work dialogues with the history of performance and explores the genre in innovative ways by provoking the curiosity and imagination of the visitor as well as by reflecting on notions about time, knowledge and the human body.

In the late 1980s and 1990s much of Hüttner's installations used computers, video and other new media. He was one of the first artists to create installations that used computers as a sculptural element and at the same time allowing them to present vast and complex information. The artist also used contemporary medical science to develop work based on research on the human brain at the Pitt Rivers Museum in Oxford, England - looking at how the brain remains in a constant state of change and regeneration. He also created exhibitions, publications and lectures with biochemist Elias Arnér that dealt with the relationship between art, science and the human body in Stockholm. In Begrepp - En Samling (Concepts a Collection) they brought together artists and scientists to dialogue about metaphysical questions.

In the late 1990s Hüttner took his interdisciplinary experiences and implemented these into a series of exhibitions investigating the relationship between the art object and the exhibition. In 2001 he co-curated an exhibition at Nylon with Goshka Macuga and Gavin Wade. Other noteworthy exhibitions that dealt with these issues and that engaged the audience in continuously reshaping the exhibition include: I am a Curator at Chisenhale Gallery in London, Repetitive Time at The Art Museum in Gothenburg and Participate? at CEAC in Xiamen, China, and at Basekamp in Philadelphia.

Parallel to this activity Hüttner created a photography project entitled "Jogging in Exotic Cities" where the artist went jogging repeatedly in far away cities that remain exotic to a western audience. In the photographs we see the artist dressed in white clothes as he makes his way through bustling cities like Chennai, Mexico City and Lusaka. The project remains one of Hüttner's most well known to date. It has been shown in museums in the US, Spain Poland, Romania, Austria, China and Sweden.

In 2004 he developed the performative aspects in the above-mentioned project and tied it back to a research about the limits of reality and documentary photography. He developed a series of photographs where he created shrines of commemoration in busy street corners of urban centres around the world. These impromptu sculptures suggested that an accident or act of violence had been committed in that specific place (while in fact they were fabricated by the artist). The work provoked complex discussions about differences and similarities between documentary traditions and the fictional. This investigation into the very fabric of reality has moved to the forefront in the artist's mature work about impermanence and change. In the catalogue text to his 2006 exhibition Xiao Yao You that displayed a large body of the work at the Guangdong Museum of Art in Guangzhou the curator, Zhang Wei, writes:

Ceaseless movement is not a way of gaining ever more exotic knowledge of the world; it is rather a way of cleaning out and rediscovering the self. This is what I see in Per’s work. When I face his images, the reality presented in them seems less a true physical reality than an invisible psychological one. I see a negotiation and dialogue between the artist’s inner and outer worlds. In this psychological landscape, he describes his worries, his pursuit of human sentiment, and his insistent rejection of a stylized or superficial life. It makes me think of the Chinese philosopher Zhuang Zi's idea of xiao yao you or "moving carelessly". This philosophy does not only detail how to move freely across physical space, but is also a metaphor for how humans can transcend different kinds of obstacles and achieve a freedom of the spirit.

The journey into the human soul was further developed in another photographic series from 2006 to 2007 entitled Democracy and Desire. The images were primarily shot at night with very long exposure times. The relationship between the individual and its search for personal liberty from social conventions again comes to the forefront in the dreamlike photography. In the catalogue text to the exhibition the work is discussed. In a typical style of the artist, it is hard to decipher who the author of the give text is and it even appears that the texts in different languages are written by different authors:

The uninhibited mental and/or physical space is very individual and extremely hard to define. But it is even more complicated, because this freedom can never be safe-guarded by consumerism, legislation or democracy anymore than the self-confidence that feeds it can be defended by a law. As artists it is our prime responsibility to fight for the right to retain and enjoy this liberty for ourselves and others. This means that we need to have an extremely grounded belief in ourselves and the work that we do. Humanity will always be engaged in a battle to safeguard this freedom and maybe that is also a good definition of what an artist is – a confident defender of the aspects of the soul that cannot be defended any other way. It has always been like that throughout history.

From 2007, Hüttner has returned both to a dialogue with science and to working with video. In a sequel to Begrepp - En Samling from 1992, Hüttner and Arnér created a project entitled (In)Visible Dialogues which focused on a series of conversations between artists and scientists at Konstakademien in Stockholm, Sweden. He also returned to these issues in a less direct way in solo exhibitions in France, China, England and Sweden. Installations such as "Do not Go Gentle", "The Quantum Police" and "Imminent" all depict eccentric people engaged in obsessive research. The work compels the visitor to reflect on whether it is meaningful to draw a line between reality and fiction. In her long text about the latter exhibition, the curator Cecilia Canziani shows how both the problematic of the singular and the collective, as well as myth and its ability influence reality, is highlighted in the artist's work:

"In Plato’s Symposium, perhaps the best known of his dialogues, Aristofanes recounts that once upon a time, human beings had two heads, four arms, four legs, they were complete, a whole, a unity. Because of their arrogance they were punished by Zeus and divided in two halves: men and women. Since then, we look for completion in the other, and such- arguably - along as being a metaphor of love, also serves as a symbol of the dialectic between singularity and collectivity that informs the political organisation of society. In "Imminent" it is not just the narrative that is fragmented, but also the characters and their multiplied personae. Different actors are cast in the same role, sometime one character is transformed into another, reminding us of the quest for unity that Plato describes."

In the Quantum Police project, the above-mentioned problematic is taken even further. Here, the artist mixes (stolen or found?) police evidence material with interviews and fictional texts that describe elaborate conspiracy theories involving the police both in Europe and China. Delving deeper into questions of authenticity, the artist has also staged events that cross the boundaries of academic presentations, guided tours, and performance art. These have taken place at institutions like MACRO in Rome, CAPC in Bordeaux, Rockbund Art Museum in Shanghai, Tate Britain and Hayward Gallery in London and as part of experimental projects like The Invisible Generation and the international research group OuUnPo. Contrary to the video work, where the sound is subdued, Hüttner often uses music in the recent performances and installations in order to purposefully create paradoxical and misleading timelines. These investigations into time, duration and the impermanent nature of knowledge have further been developed in an ongoing collaborative research with the Turkish writer/curator Fatos Üstek that started like a creative writing exchange in the Anglo-Austrian magazine Nowiswere and that has led to interventions in museums like the Wacoal Art Center in Tokyo and Tate Modern in London as well as in public spaces in New York City, Philadelphia, Porto, Yokohama and Athens.

== Exhibitions ==
=== Solo exhibitions and touring performances ===
- Transversal Madness, (with C. Neusser) Satyrianas festival, São Paulo, Brazil, F4Libre, Cuarnevaca, Mexico and El Dia D, Mexico City (2019–2020)
- The Boundaries of Death Challenged, (With Jean-Louis Huhta and Jean Claude Saintilus) Lenin, Murmansk; Ä’vv Skolt Sami Museum, Neiden; Terminal B, Kirkenes; Fristaden, Stockholm and Putte's Bar & Pizza, Helsinki. (2018)
- The Electric Brain, (with 1+1=3) Bibliothèque Charcot, Paris (2018)
- Wayob, Galleri Fagerstedt Stockholm, Sweden (2017)
- What is Potential? Exploring Aristotle, Art and Medicine Wellcome Collection Reading Room, London (2015)
- V8skan Nobel Museum, Stockholm, Sweden (2015).
- The Silence Galleri Fagerstedt, Stockholm, Sweden (2015).
- Poseidon Recreates Lake Texcoco, Alam + Petrov and Casa Punk, Mexico City, Mexico with Jean-Louis Huhta (2014)
- (In)Visible Dialogues (with biochemist Elias Arnér), curated by Lena Boëthius, Konstakademien, Stockholm, Sweden (2011)
- Quantum Police, curated by Anne Klontz, Valerie Lambert Gallery, Brussels; DKTUS Stockholm and Putting Out the Fire with Gasoline, Manufactura's Studio, Wuhan, China; The Old Police Station and Cartel in London(2011).
- unknown at Zendai Contemporary Art Exhibition Hall, Shanghai, China (2010)
- Imminent, Fei Contemporary Art Center, Shanghai, China (2010)
- Do not Go Gentle, ERBA and Musée du Temps, Besançon, France (2009)
- Xiao Yao You, Guandong Museum of Art, Guangzhou, China (2006)
- Tundro, Contemporary Art Gallery, National Museum, Szczecin, Poland (2006)
- Repetitive Time, Göteborgs Konstmuseum, Gothenburg, Sweden (2006)
- Democracia y Deseo, Vacio 9, Madrid, Spain (2006)
- Per Hüttner, Xposeptember, Liljevalchs Konsthall, Stockholm, Sweden (2005)
- I Am a Curator, Chisenhale Gallery, London, UK (2003)

=== Group exhibitions and performances ===
- The Power of Ontologies, 2084, Catalysti, The Cable Factory, Helsinki (2020)
- Start in the Middle, (curated by Dansehallerne), Kunsthal Charlottenborg, Copenhagen, Denmark (2019)
- AnAtomic (performance with 1+1=3), Folkteatern, Gothenburg, Sweden (2019)
- Gossip Cards, Museo Jumex, Mexico City, Mexico (2017)
- 0/0 – for Jeanette, Bonniers konsthall, Stockholm, Sweden (2016)
- Gärning – Fotografi ur Göteborgs konstmuseums samling, Göteborgs konstmuseum, Gothenburg (2016)
- Human Parallells, Collateral Event, Biennale Jogja XIII, Yogyakarta, Indonesia (2015)
- Troubled Waters, 10th Baltic Contemporary Art Biennial, Contemporary Art Gallery, National Museum, Szczecin, Poland (2015)
- Normalcy, Moderna Bar, Moderna museet (with Isabel Löfgren, Samon Takahashi, Jean-Louis Huhta etc.) (2014)
- Formas únicas da continuidade no espaço, 33 Panorama da arte brasileira (Curated by Lisette Lagnado), São Paulo Museum of Modern Art, São Paulo, Brazil.
- Godzilla and the Phoenix, OuUnPo-Japan, Wacoal art Center, BankART and Embassy of Sweden, Tokyo/Yokohama, Japan, (2013)
- Transmedia, (curated by Yang Qingqing), Palais de Tokyo, Paris, France (2013)
- An Opera in Five Acts, David Roberts Arts Foundation, London, UK (with Fatos Ustek) (2012–13)
- Le choix de titre est un faux problème, CNEAI Paris, Paris, France (2011)
- Concrete Poetry, The Hayward Gallery, London (2011)
- "Crash – The other versions", with postautonomy.co.uk, Liverpool Biennial, Liverpool UK and various public venues in Zürich, Switzerland (2008)
- "Nothing to Declare", 4th. Oberschwaben Contemporary Art Triennial, Friedrichshafen, Germany (2008)
- "Art is always somewhere else", International Biennial of Young Artists, Bucharest, Romania (2006)
- "20 Years!", Bonniers Konsthall, Stockholm, Sweden (2006)
- "BIDA 2003", Centro de Arte de Salamanca, Spain (2003)
- "Slowdive", Yerba Buena Center for the Arts, San Francisco, USA (2002)
- 3 in 1, Nylon Gallery, London, UK (with Gavin Wade and Goshka Macuga)
- "Fasten Seatbelts", Galerie Krinzinger, Vienna, Austria (1998)

== Monographs ==
- The Quantum Police, with texts by Anne Klontz; Johnny Ross and Willie Hansen (1969) and a short story by Wang Xiao Ping (in Chinese and English). Design by Erik Månsson, 96 pages in full colour + 5 fold-out sheets. Published by Lambert Gallery and Vision Forum 2011, ISBN 978-91-978934-5-9.
- (In)visible Dialogues, 2011, languages: English and Swedish, 240 pages, design by Åbäke. Published by Dent-de-Leone. ISBN 978-91-978934-3-5 and ISBN 978-0-9561885-5-7
- The Imminent Interviews, 2010, 90 pages, languages: English and Chinese, published by Fei Contemporary Art Center, Shanghai and Vision Forum 2010, ISBN 978-91-978934-4-2
- Per Hüttner: Democracy and Desire, 2007, 158 pages (A3) including 10 colour fold out pages. Languages: English, Swedish, Spanish and Rumanian. Design by Åbäke. Published by Vacio 9 and The Rumanian Cultural Institute. ISBN 978-91-633-0548-1.
- Per Hüttner: Xiao Yao You, 2006, 96 pages including 10 fold out colour pictures and multi-foldout cover, texts by Bo Nilsson and Zhang Wei, languages: English, Swedish and Chinese, design by byboth. Published by Guangdong Museum of Art. ISBN 978-91-631-9345-3.
- 'Per Hüttner: Repetitive Time, 2006, 116 pages including 30 colour plates, texts by Lena Boëthius, Laurent Devèze, Per Hüttner, Claire Canning and Stéphanie Nava, language: English, design by Henrik Gistvall. Published by Göteborgs Konstmuseum. ISBN 91-631-7127-9.
- Per Hüttner: I am a Curator, 2005, 138 pages including 13 fold out colour pages, texts by Per Hüttner, Hannah Rickards, Celine Condorelli, Gavin Wade, Veronique Wiesinger, Duncan McLaren, Lisa LeFeuvre and Scott Rigby, language: English. Published by Chisenhale Gallery. ISBN 91-631-5132-4
- Per Hüttner. Stockholm: Föreningen Curatorial Mutiny, 2004. ISBN 91-631-5131-6. With text by Duncan McLaren.

== Public collections ==
- Göteborgs konstmuseum, Gothenburg, Sweden.
- Guangdong Museum of Art, Guangzhou, China
- Contemporary Art Gallery, National Museum, Szczecin, Poland
- Bonniers Konsthall, Stockholm, Sweden
- Abecita konstmuseum, Borås, Sweden
- Zendai Contemporary Art Exhibition Hall, Shanghai, China
- Museu de Arte Moderna de São Paulo, São Paulo, Brazil
