= Begrepp – En samling =

Art project based in Stockholm, Sweden

Begrepp – En Samling (Concepts – a Collection) was an art project realized at the Royal Academy of Fine Arts in Stockholm in 1992. It comprised an exhibition, a publication and a lecture series that all focused on the heart and brain in various fields: art, science, religion, the occult and cooking, in order to reflect on the philosophical and practical relationship between art and science. The project was initiated by artist Per Huttner, at that time a student at the Royal Institute of Art in Stockholm and M.D. Ph.D. student Elias Arnér.

In the exhibition, one could see two large metal and glass sculptures of the heart and the brain that contained the crumbled posters promoting the exhibition. Large photographs of histological samples of the two organs sat next to scientific abstracts, occult and religious images. Close to the entry of the exhibition, hearts and brains of various animals including an elephant and a lemur which had been lent by the Museum of Natural History sat next to recipes of how to cook the organs. The lectures were held by Professor Lennart Wetterberg on the subject of how Swedenborg looked at the brain, Professor Erna Möller and the artist Lenke Rothman dialogued about creativity in their respective fields; Professor Rolf Luft examined social and cultural implications among Nobel Laureates in the sciences and Lars Olson talked about how a medial scientist sees the brain. Each lecturer also contributed with a text in the publication. In 2007, after Hüttner had developed some of the experiences from Begrepp – En Samling in projects like I am a Curator”, Democracy and Desire and formed the international research network Vision Forum, Huttner and Arnér decided to set up a continuation of their project, entitled (In)Visible Dialogues, which was shown publicly in the same venue in 2011, almost 20 years after the first exhibition.
