= I am a Curator =

I am a Curator was a process-based exhibition project by artist Per Hüttner that took place at Chisenhale Gallery, London, UK, 5 November – 14 December 2003. During the period individual or groups of people with no experience of exhibition making created 36 exhibitions and briefly got to experience the process putting together a contemporary art show. They had artwork by 57 artists to interact with. The project stirred a lot of controversy in the art world at the time. The most common critique was that the project suggested that curation and exhibition making is easy Hüttner responded to this by writing: "the goal of the project was to inspire a more diverse and profound discussion about the meaning of artworks, exhibitions and the role of the artist." Over the years, the project has gained recognition and has been hailed as being ahead of its time and has been widely appreciated for its visionary qualities in readers on curation and research on the subject of art and exhibition making.

== Background ==
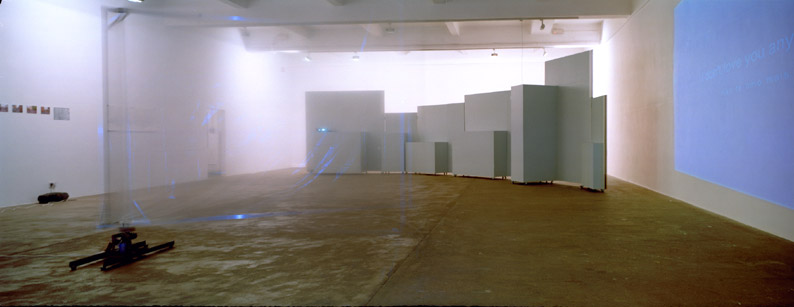
Installation view from I am a Curator Chisenhale Gallery, 13 November 2003, Muller Kneer Associates

Hüttner carried out a series of exhibitions that democratized or investigated the curatorial process in the late 1990s and in the early years of the new millennium. Many of these were collaborative and took place at the Gallery Konstakuten in Stockholm, The Hood Gallery in Los Angeles but also in galleries and public spaces in London, New York City and Vancouver and involved artists from different generations and included Geoffrey Farmer, Brian Jungen, Lenke Rothman, Neil Goldstein and curators like Reid Shier and Tone O Nielsen. In 2001 he created the curatorial framework for an exhibition at Nylon in collaboration with Goshka Macuga and Gavin Wade. and in 2002 at Curatorial Market at Cuchifritos and various public venues including Essex Street Market in New York. In these projects he developed ideas and practices that pointed towards a new way of relating to the art object and exhibition making that eventually became manifest in I am a Curator.:

"Despite its populist ideals, the Curatorial Market raises complex, insider issues about the relationship between artist and curator. ‘These two disciplines are beginning to mix and merge in ways that some people find appalling and others see as a powerful new development in the history of art making,’ Paul Clay explains. However, abandoning the idea of the autonomous piece of art can be problematic. ‘Having art that relates very strongly to the market context can fuck up the commodification process in an interesting way. It both points it up as an object to consume, and at the same time makes it harder to effectively remove from its context in order to be sold.’ Furthermore, ‘There is a danger that when curators have too strong an over-arching vision, the artists' works can end up simply as building blocks used to construct the curator's point. On the other hand if the curator's point is weak then the works can get stranded totally out of context’."

Hüttner has since developed these strategies both in projects like Repetitive Time, Democracy and Desire, (In)Visible Dialogues and in the international research network Vision Forum.

== Basic structure ==
During six weeks people or groups of people with no prior experience in exhibition making undertook 36 investigative exercises into the process of putting together an exhibition. From the outset, the idea was to create an exhibition each day, but quickly the focus moved to investigate the 57 artworks as a resource. In order to realize this strategy the artist developed some basic concepts:

Curator of the Day: The daily slots were administered through an application process through which we tried to give as many different people as possible, in relation to occupation, age, sex, social and ethnic background. More often than not, the Curator of Day was a small group. Meaning that in the end roughly 70 people were curators.

The Gallery Crew: The Gallery Crew was the Curators of the Day's aid in developing their ideas and the project that they wanted to realize during the day. The Curator of the Day was not allowed to touch the artwork, except in those cases when this was an integral part of the piece. All the handling and mounting of the work was carried out by the Gallery Crew. The crew was also responsible for informing the visitors to the gallery about the project and answering questions.

Support Structure: Support Structure hosted all the artwork. It was mobile and it was also used to display work, as well as change the size and appearance of the space. It incorporated two tables and half a dozen chairs that could also be used as plinths to present work on. But Celine Condorelli and Gavin Wade took their brief further and allowed Support Structure be a questioning and critical tool and an important aspect of the process of the project. The structure took the centre stage, but in an unexpected way the Curators of the Day remained strangely blind to the eleven meter long monster object on wheels and few, if any, references were made to it in their reports. The two also offered objects and lists of what to do if the Curator of the Day gets stuck and included phone numbers to well-known contemporary curators.

The Selectors: To provide a dynamic collection for the Curator of the Day to choose from, six people were asked to select artwork for I Am a Curator. Each devised a different approach for his or her selection. They were Patrick Bernier, Melanie Keen, Lisa Le Feuvre, Tone O. Nielsen, Reid Shier and Per Hüttner.

The Interface Cards: A5-sized plastic cards were designed and realized by American artist Scott Rigby. For each artwork available for selection there was one corresponding Interface Card. The Interface Cards along with the website (which used the same design) were the main tools for the Curator of the Day to select artwork and devise their exhibition.

The Website: All the artwork available for selection could be browsed on Chisenhale Gallery's website. There was also continually updated photographic documentation of the exhibitions created by the Curators of the Day.

== The exhibitions and the audience ==
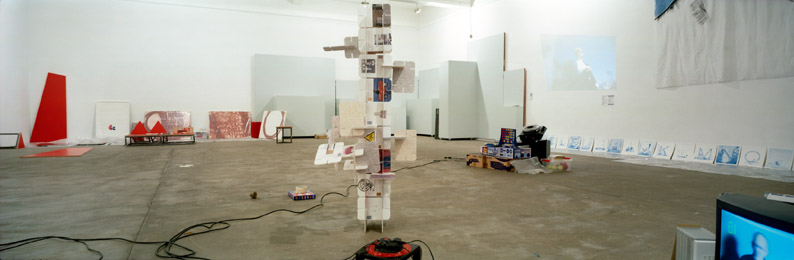
Installation view from I am a Curator Chisenhale Gallery, 12 November 2003, Embassy of Work with Me/Åbäke

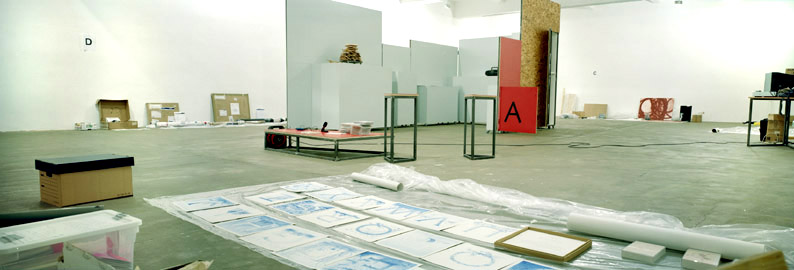
Installation view from I am a Curator Chisenhale Gallery, 14 December 2003, Lisa Maddigan and Fuyubi Nakamura

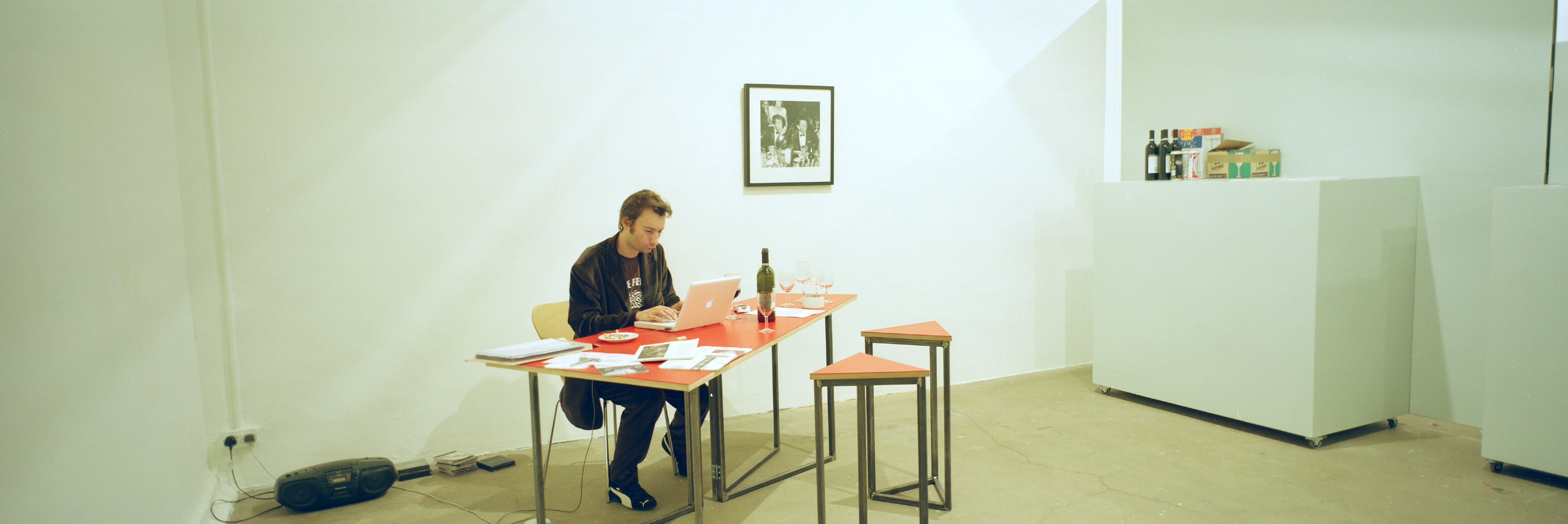
Installation view from I am a Curator Chisenhale Gallery, 13 December 2003, Sebastian Roach, Art for Alcohol Day

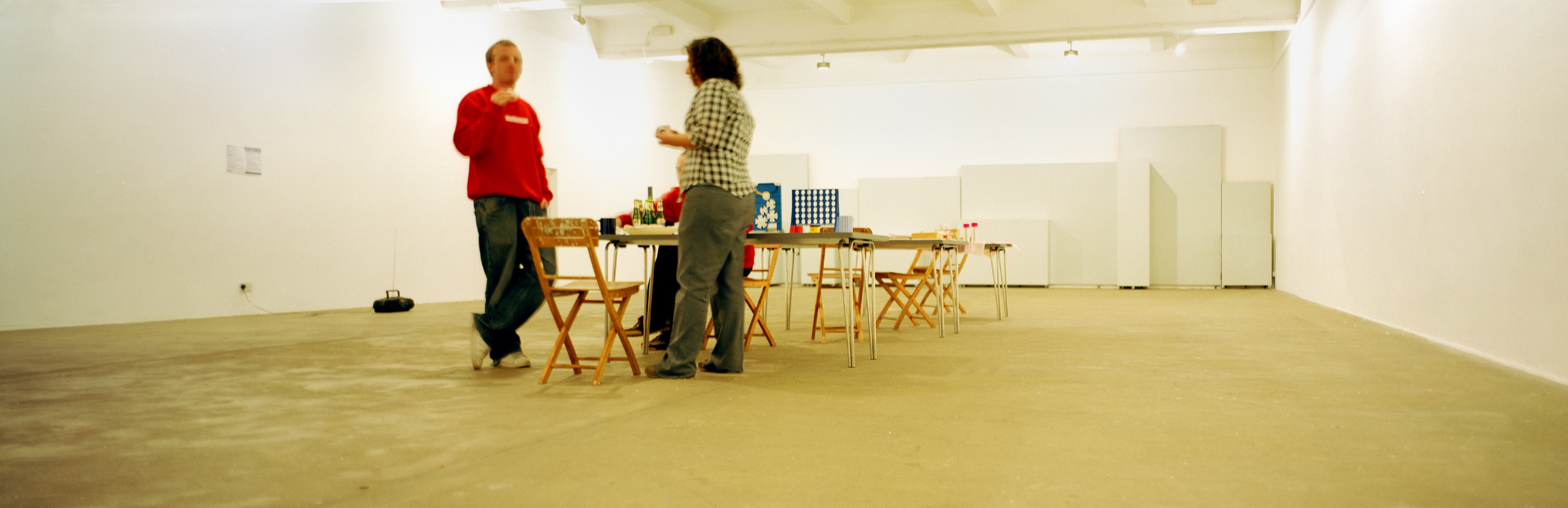
Installation view from I am a Curator Chisenhale Gallery, 11 December 2003, Anton Nikolotov

Each of the 36 exhibitions realized within the framework of I am a Curator took on very different forms and used the artwork and the space in very different ways. Artist Hannah Rickards who was leading the gallery crew describes an exhibition that had great impact on the development of the project:

"Embassy of Work With Me (å.b.ä.k.e /RCA), emptied Support Structure of all its contents, Jokers and artworks, and developed a chromatic scale around the walls of the gallery (the structure having been pushed to the corner). The colour of the individual group members’ clothes determined which works they had responsibility for placing. The process had a very easily achieved self-perpetuating logic that extended to colour-coding drill batteries, masking tape, spirit levels, any tools that we may have set down for a moment. The colour-coding also included the covers of the CDs bought from the local junk shop in order to complete Sam Ely and Lynn Harris’ Playlist, along with all the book covers from Céline Condorelli’s and Gavin Wade's Joker selection of books. This seemed the most natural and successful exercise in devolution and levelling democratization that occurred during the run of the show. The ‘artworks’ suffered less in this melee than they often did when not surrounded by a chromatic sea of things; they were scrutinized and investigated by the curating group."

Hüttner talks about a few of the key experiences among the 36 exhibitions:

”I have to mention Anton Nikolotov’s project (11/12/03). He wanted the work to be selected democratically. He thus devoted the whole day discussing with the visitors which works should be displayed. Each visitor who was present at a given moment was given some time to voice why a certain piece should or shouldn't be shown. When everyone had presented their case, the group voted and notes were taken on the different ideas and how many votes the different pieces got. In the end the only show that was presented was one made up of these notes shown in the massive empty space. This approach allowed I Am a Curator to be taken to another level. The boundaries between Curator of the Day and audience vanished entirely. It was wonderful to see how the process of democratization could be taken one step further than had originally been foreseen. This democratic process was at once extremely rewarding, but also hugely tiring. Rarely have I seen the members of the Gallery Crew leave so happy and tired. It was also great to see how visitors tended to stay for hours to join the discussion. At one point 15 people were present for the vote."

Other shows included Sebastian Roach's Art for Wine Day 13/12/03 which took quite a nihilist approach to the task of selecting work:

”In exchange for the donation of a bottle of wine (or beer, or spirits – even a miniature, the important thing is the token) a visitor can select and display any piece of work in the show. Alternatively they can donate a new piece of work and I will give them a bottle of wine in exchange for it. In addition, through the course of the day I will install myself in an ‘office’ created by using the versatile structure as walls drinking wine, smoking cigarettes and writing. What I write will be spontaneous and in response – directly, indirectly, or entirely tenuously – to the work, the environment and the situation, and will obviously also be tempered by the increasing consumption of alcohol. Whatever writing I do produce at the end of the day will also be available in exchange for wine."

The diversity of the Curator of the Day and how they interacted with the work can be exemplified by Hüttner's endnote in the catalogue:

” The data that I Am a Curator generated is in itself something that would suffice for a research project. I was pleased on the last day of the exhibition that the two anthropologists Lisa Maddigan and Fuyubi Nakamura did a project that looked at the accumulated information. I think that they were slightly awestruck by the sheer bulk of information and work that could be hosted within the project. It is like the number of possibilities of arranging 57 artworks that Maki from å.b.ä.k.e. had calculated – 144,115,188,075,856,000. Considering that our solar system is roughly 2,400,000,000,000,000 minutes old the number of possibilities is quite mind-boggling. ”

== Critique ==
At the time of the realization of the project there was some rather loud critique towards the project. It was suggested that it offered a very traditional approach to the idea of how an exhibition might be made. In an interview with Barnaby Drabble the artist says.:

"I do agree, when you are faced with the possibility of just selecting existing art work that is a very traditional take on what a curator is. But then again, I think that I Am A Curator tried to do something that goes beyond that. By using a very traditional approach it enabled us to do something that was extremely creative and which opened new ideas about how to put together exhibitions. In terms of selecting the works, It wasn't as if they had only five pieces to choose from. To consider the work of fifty-seven artists in one afternoon is a major task. Also, a lot of the work was not finished, it was up to the curator of the day to complete it, a lot was interactive, and a lot had different elements that needed to be put together. So there were many different approaches on offer, reflecting the working methods of the original selectors."

Another criticism of the project was that the individual artwork never got the attention it deserved. Hannah Rickards who was leading the gallery crew writes:

"Even the 57 official ‘artworks,’ depending on their treatment by the Curator of the Day, sometimes barely managed to retain their “artwork” status. There were times when they did slip into being things in cupboards or things on the wall. That slippage between artworks and objects, or between people’s roles in the process, is something I see as having been central to the project, so I don’t know if I necessarily see the need for a posthumous proliferation of the term “artwork.” It feels like laminating a piece of paper you are still making notes on. In the context of this project a wipe-clean definition seems to jar."

In a review for C: International Contemporary Art Magazine, Fergal Stapleton described the exhibition as "a game, mutative and feudal, with several tiers of collusion" and "a bid for curatorial practice as art, and for curatorial supremacy over its subject arts disciplines." In his PhD thesis Barnaby Drabble uses I am a Curator as one of three case studies. He quotes Stapleton and builds a severe critique to the project which he perceives as being elitist and self-promotional under the guise of being democratic. On a more positive note British sociologist and media theorist, David Gauntlett suggests that projects like I am a Curator expands art into being a visual sociology;

"We should note that, in some cases, the work of socially engaged visual artists and the work of visual sociologists can look very similar. Many artists have used art to explore identity, memory and the construction of selfhood [...]. Other contemporary artists have engaged in a more externally oriented art practice which involves ‘ordinary’ people in the making of work. Just as visual sociology sometimes blurs into something like art, in these projects, art expands into being a kind of visual sociology. There are many instances of such projects; here I will give just a few examples. A project by the artist Per Hüttner, at Chisenhale Gallery, London, entitled I Am a Curator, gave 30 individuals or groups the opportunity to be ‘Curator of the Day’, over a period of six weeks (5 November–14 December 2003). Each day a new exhibition was assembled, using work by 57 artists that was made available in the gallery."

It is clear that, I am a Curator offered novel ways for the audience to interact with artwork and the idea of an exhibition. They were forced to deal with art in a more intimate way than in a traditional exhibition. This means that the art on display might have been visible to a smaller audience than in a normal situation and yet at the same time the intimacy, reflection and constant change of context that the work was perceived in, meant that the audience was offered the possibility to understand the complexities and contradictions of artwork on a more profound level. This experimental approach to authorship and authenticity offers opportunity for creative interpretations. This openness in its turn has led to that I am a Curator has been appropriated by various participants of the project as being 'their own' in publications and academic texts.

== Post exhibition events ==
For the 10 year anniversary of I am a Curator David Roberts Art Foundation in London invited Per Huttner to reflect on the project. In the press release it is stated that "The project also provoked profound questions about artistic identity and its relationship to collectivity. Both shifts, in turn, lead to changed perspectives on the relationship between artworks, exhibitions, curators and artists. In short, IAAC opened a floodgate of problematics that overwhelmed the team working with the project. It is therefore important to revisit these questions after 10 years have passed, and to see how they have influenced individual artistic processes and how they can guide us into meaningful future reflections on related issues." Per Hüttner was joined by artist/architect Céline Condorelli, neuroscientist Stephen Whitmarsh and Anette and Alberto Giacometti Foundation Director Véronique Wiesinger. In 2020, extensive documentation from I am a Curator was included in the exhibition "Anti-exhibition" at the Southwest School of Art in Austin, Texas curated by Chad Dawkins.

== Participating artists and curators ==
Åbäke, A-clip, Jack Albin. Roger Andersson, Roderick Barton, Patrick Bernier, Mariana Botey & The Invisible College, BRING OUT THE GARBAGE, Blair Butterfield, Lee Campbell, Lucia Cipriano, Celine Condorelli & Gavin Wade, Richard Couzins, Andrew Dadson, Daedalus, divine forces radio, Nathalia Edenmont, Sam Ely and Lynn Harris, Ivan Fayard, Jon Fawcett, Carlee Fernandez, Leslie Fratkin, Hans Jörgen Johansen, Anya Gallacio, Henrik Gistvall, Morten Goll, Colin Glen, Kate Grieve, Arni Gudmundsson, Joachim Hamou, Alexis Harding, Dan Hays, Sharon Hayes, Robby Herbst, Guillaume Janot, Melanie Keen, Arnold J .Kemp, Calum F Kerr, Charles LaBelle, Runo Lagomarsino, Lisa LeFeuvre, Fernand Léger, 21 March, Helen Marshall, Amitis Motevalli, Valérie Mrejen, Stéphanie Nava, Tone O. Nielsen, Michael Euyung Oh, Leonard Palmestål, James Porter, Nathaniel Rackowe, Laercio Redondo, Scott Rigby & Maciej Wisniewski, Lenke Rothman, Marina Roy, Reid Shier, Nebojsa Seric - Shoba, Stellar, Tommy Støckel, Tamura Satoru, Althea Thauberger, Johan Tirén, Christina Ulke & Neil Stuber, V3TO, Eti & Daniel Wade, Julia Warr, Gillian Wearing, Eva Weinmayr, Simon Woolham, Mario Ybarra, Jr.

== Publication ==
- Per Hüttner: I am a Curator, 2005, 138 pages including 13 fold out colour pages, texts by Per Hüttner, Hannah Rickards, Celine Condorelli, Gavin Wade, Véronique Wiesinger, Duncan McLaren, Lisa LeFeuvre and Scott Rigby, language: English. Design by Byboth. Published by Chisenhale Gallery. ISBN 91-631-5132-4.
