= Sivar Arnér =

Swedish novelist and playwright

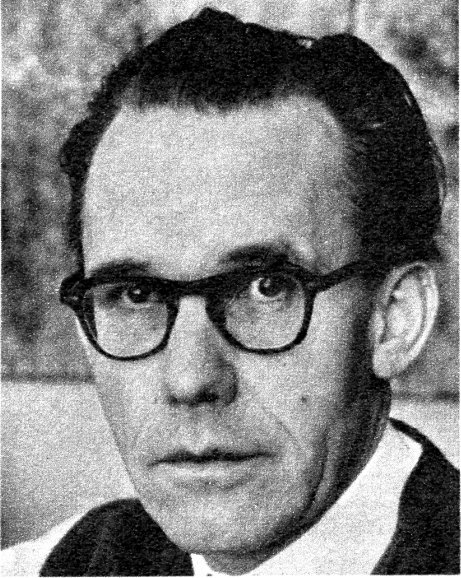
- Arnér in 1968
- Born: Ernst Nils Sivar Erik Arnér; 13 March 1909; Kalmar County, Sweden
- Died: 13 January 1997 (aged 87); Stockholm, Sweden
- Spouse: Lenke Rothman (m. 1929)
- Children: Elias Arnér
- Writing career
- Period: 1943–1991
- Notable works: Plånbok borttappad; Knekt och klerk; Tvärbalk

Sivar Arnér (13 March 1909 – 13 January 1997) was a Swedish novelist and playwright.

== Biography ==
Arnér was born on 13 March 1909, in the Arby parish of Kalmar County, Sweden. He was the son of the merchant Ernst Arnér and Hilda Nilsson. His brother Gotthard Arnér (1913–2002) was a cathedral organist first at Växjö Cathedral and later at Storkyrkan in Stockholm. His brother Ivar Arnér (1921–1986) was an economist and chief financial officer of Gothenburg Railways.

Arnér attended Lund University where he received his Ph.D. in 1932. He was employed as a teacher at Karlskrona, Skara and Norrköping until 1948. He subsequently settled in Stockholm to become a full-time writer.Among his novels are Plånbok borttappad (1943), Knekt och klerk (1945) and Tvärbalk (1963). Arnér also published a number of dramas including Fem hörspel (1959) and Drottningen (1984). He was awarded the Dobloug Prize in 1971.

Arnér was married to the Hungarian-born artist and author Lenke Rothman. They were the parents of Elias Arnér (born 1966), noted professor in biochemistry at the Karolinska Institutet. Arnér died on 13 January 1997, aged 87, in Stockholm, and was buried at Voxtorp Church, Kalmar County.
