= Fatoş Üstek =

Turkish curator and writer (born 1980)

- Born: 1980 (age 45–46); Ankara, Turkey
- Education: Boğaziçi University; Goldsmiths, University of London
- Occupations: Curator and writer
- Website: www.fatosustek.com

Fatoş Üstek (born 1980 in Ankara) is a London-based independent Turkish curator and writer, working internationally with large-scale organizations, biennials and festivals, as well as commissioning in the public realm. In 2008, she received her MA in Contemporary Art Theory from Goldsmiths College London, after completing her BA in Mathematics at Bogazici University in Istanbul.

== Work ==
In 2014, Üstek acted as Associate Curator for the 10th Gwangju Biennale in South Korea. subsequently, she curated the fig-2 project, hosted by the Institute of Contemporary Art ICA in London in 2015. The series of 50-week-long exhibitions showed works by artists Laura Eldret, Charles Avery, Rebecca Birch, Annika Ström, Beth Collar, Allison Katz, Tom McCarthy, Shezad Dawood, Suzanne Treister, Lynn Marsh, Jacopo Miliani, Kathryn Elkin, Marjolijn Dijkman, Ben Judd, Karen Mirza, Oreet Ashery, Eva Grubinger, Melanie Manchot, Bruce McLean, Vesna Petresin, Young in Hong, and duo Wright and Vandame, among others.

Üstek was in charge the Akbank 40th Contemporary Artists Prize Exhibition in Istanbul 2022. The same year, she curated Cascading Principles: Expansions within Geometry, Philosophy, and Interference at Oxford Mathematics, one of the largest exhibitions by the artist Conrad Shawcross in the UK. It is accompanied by a four-part symposium in partnership with Modern Art Oxford and Ruskin School of Art.

Üstek sits on selection and award committees for the Scottish and Dutch Pavilions at Venice Biennial and was a judge on Turner Prize 2020. Early 2022, Üstek was appointed as Chair of Trustees of New Contemporaries., which supports emerging artists.

Together with artists Anne Hardy and Lindsay Seers, Üstek is co-founder of FRANK, an alliance for fair artists’ pay. She is also a founding member of The Association of Women in the Arts (AWITA), a non-profit networking group that aims to advance the careers of women in the visual arts.

Since 2023, Üstek is curator of Frieze Sculpture, a major annual public art exhibition placing monumental works by leading artists throughout London's Regent's Park. Her first exhibition included works by more than 20 international artists like Ghada Amer, Angela Bulloch, Catharine Czudej, Ayşe Erkmen, Gülsün Karamustafa, Suhasini Kejriwal, Louise Nevelson, Hans Rosenström and Yinka Shonibare. In 2024, she presented artists Frances Goodman, İnci Eviner, Céline Condorelli, Mohamed Ahmed Ibrahim, Theaster Gates, Anna Boghiguian, Zanele Muholi and Leonora Carrington, among others.

In her 2024 publication, The Art Institution of Tomorrow, Üstek proposes changes that art institutions will need to undergo in order to maintain their relevance for generations to come.

== Recognition ==
Fatoş Üstek was listed among the 100 most important people in the art world in the Artlyst Power 100 list in since 2017.

== Publications ==
- The Art Institution of Tomorrow: Reinventing the Model, Lund Humphries Publishers Ltd/Sotheby's Institute of Art, 2024
