= Céline Condorelli =

French-born Italian artist (born 1974)

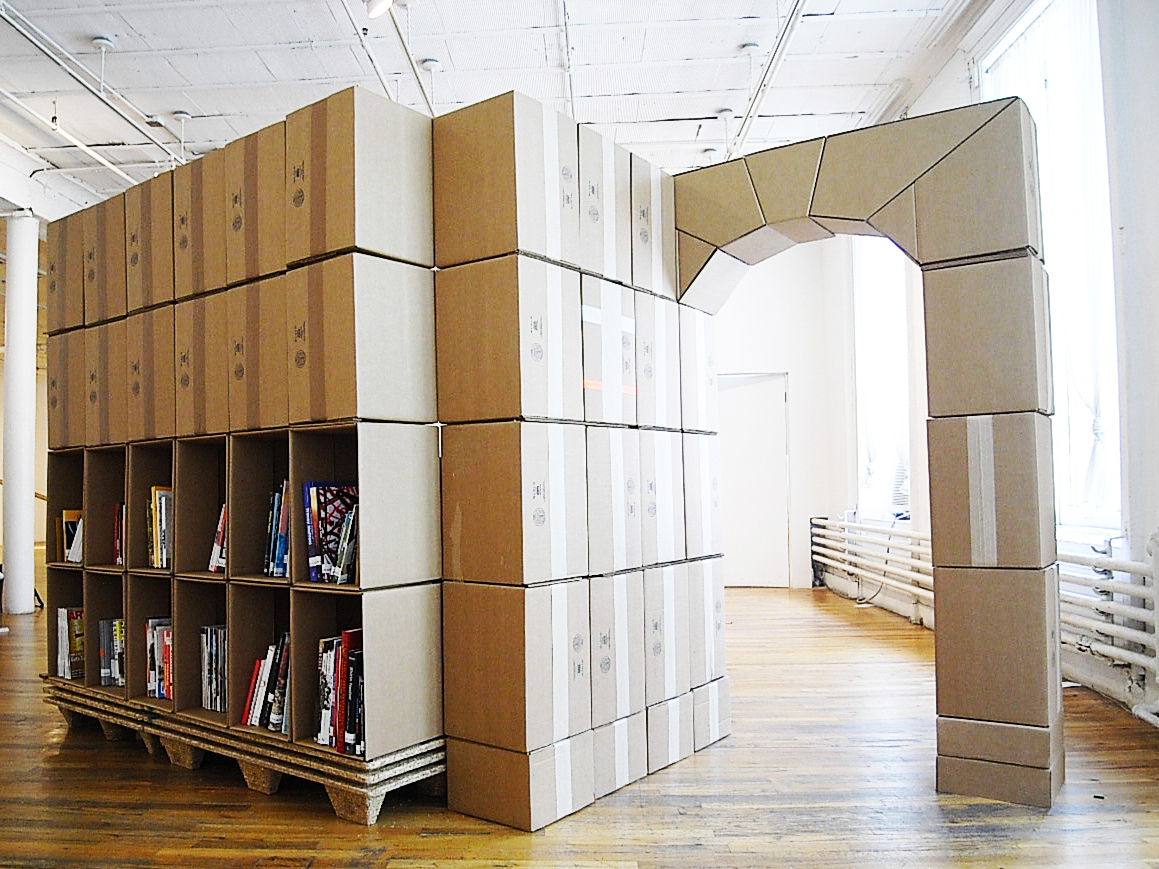
- Born: 1974 (age 51–52); Boulogne-Billancourt, Hauts-de-Seine, France
- Education: Goldsmiths, University of London (PhD); University of East London (MA)
- Occupation: Artist
- Website: celinecondorelli.eu

Céline Condorelli (born 1974) is a French-born Italian artist who works in London and Lisbon. She is best known for her publications The Company She Keeps and Support Structures (a co-publication with James Langdon and Gavin Wade, Director of Eastside Projects), as well as her artworks which work across the spheres of art and architecture. She was shortlisted for the Max Mara Art Prize for Women in 2017.

Her work spans architecture and art, exploring relationships, mechanisms and structures which often go unnoticed.

== Education ==
Condorelli received her PhD in Research Architecture from Goldsmiths College, London, England, 2013. Prior to this she completed an MA in History and Theory of Architecture, University of East London, London, England, 2000. Before which, she achieved her RIBA part 2 and diploma from the Architectural Association School of Architecture, London, England, 1999 and her RIBA part 1 and degree from the Architectural Association School of Architecture, London, England, 1995.

== Work ==
She is co-founder of Eastside Projects in Birmingham and is currently Professor of Exhibition Design and Research at Karlsruhe University of Arts and Design (HfG Kalrsruhe), Germany.

She has also been Professor at NABA (Nuova Accademia di Belle Arti) Milan, Italy, in the MA in Visual Arts and Curatorial Studies, external examiner at Chelsea College of Art & Design (2009-2014) and was senior lecturer at London Metropolitan University School of Architecture and Spatial Design. She has delivered talks and presentations across the globe, including: the Chisenhale Gallery, the Serpentine gallery, the Tate Modern, The Showroom, London; IASPIS, Stockholm.

== Exhibitions ==
=== Solo exhibitions ===
- 2024: In the Light of What We Know, Remai Modern, CA
- 2023: Pentimenti (The Corrections), The National Gallery, London
- 2022: After Work, Talbot Rice Gallery, University of Edinburgh
- 2020: Two Years’ Vacation, FRAC Lorraine, FR

=== Group exhibitions ===
- 2024: Radical Playgrounds, Gropius Bau, DE
- 2021: Our Silver City 2094, Nottingham Contemporary, UK
- 2017: Anren Biennale, Chengdu, China
- 2016: Liverpool Biennial, UK
- 2016: The Eight Climate (What Does Art Do?) Gwangju Biennale, South Korea
- 2016: 20th Sydney Biennale, Australia
