= Elias Arnér =

Swedish professor (born 1966)

- Born: Elias Set Jenö Arnér; 2 March 1966 (age 60)
- Occupation: Professor
- Spouse: MaiBritt Giacobini
- Children: 2
- Parent(s): Sivar Arnér; Lenke Rothman

Academic background
- Education: Karolinska Institute

Academic work
- Discipline: Redox biology, cancer research.
- Institutions: Karolinska Institute

Elias Set Jenö Arnér (born 2 March 1966) is a Swedish biochemist and professor at the Karolinska Institute in Stockholm. His research concerns redox biology, selenoprotein biochemistry and cancer, with particular emphasis on the mammalian thioredoxin system and the selenoprotein thioredoxin reductase 1.

Arnér is professor of biochemistry in the Department of Medical Biochemistry and Biophysics at the Karolinska Institute and has headed its Division of Biochemistry since 2008. Since 2016, he has served as departmental director of doctoral studies. He became a member of the Nobel Assembly at the Karolinska Institute in 2022, and has been Director of Cancer Research KI since 2024.

== Education ==
Arnér entered Karolinska Institutet's combined medical and doctoral programme in 1986. He received a Ph.D. in 1993 for research on nucleotide metabolism and nucleoside analogues, supervised by Staffan Eriksson. He received his M.D. from the Karolinska Institute in 1997.

== Career ==
Arnér worked with August Böck at LMU Munich in Germany from 1998 to 1999, where he studied the production of recombinant selenoproteins in Escherichia coli. He returned to the Karolinska Institute in 1999.

Arnér became a docent in medical biochemistry at the Karolinska Institute in 2000 and was appointed professor of biochemistry in 2009. In 2008, he succeeded Arne Holmgren as head of the Division of Biochemistry in the Department of Medical Biochemistry and Biophysics.

From 2001 to 2005 he was director of studies for the M.D./Ph.D. programme at the Karolinska Institute, and from 2005 to 2007 he served as dean of its Board of Postgraduate Education. He was a member of the Swedish Research Council's Scientific Council for Medicine and Health from 2019 to 2024 and served on the National Committee for Molecular Biosciences of the Royal Swedish Academy of Sciences from 2015 to 2023, including as chair from 2019 to 2021.

Since 2024, he has been Director of Cancer Research KI, the cancer-research organisation within the Karolinska Institute.

== Research ==
Arnér's research focuses on the biochemical functions of selenoproteins and the role of redox-regulated processes in health and disease. His work is in the mammalian thioredoxin system, particularly the cytosolic selenoprotein thioredoxin reductase 1 (TrxR1), encoded by the TXNRD1 gene. His group studies the expression, regulation and function of TrxR1 and its splice variants, including their involvement in cellular signalling and cancer.

Arnér's early postdoctoral work with Arne Holmgren examined mammalian thioredoxin reductase as a selenoprotein. His later work at LMU Munich addressed the production of recombinant selenoproteins in E. coli, establishing a second major line of research in his laboratory. In a 2009 study with colleagues, his group reported structural and catalytic work on thioredoxin reductase 1, contributing to understanding of the enzyme's selenocysteine-dependent activity.

More recent work from Arnér's group has examined interactions between thioredoxin reductase 1, cellular signalling pathways and metabolic regulation. Publications from 2024 to 2026 include studies of TXNRD1 in relation to cellular signalling, fluorescent probes for thioredoxin-system activity, and mechanisms for targeting thioredoxin reductase and other selenoproteins in cancer research.

== Awards and honors ==
- 2009 – Distinguished Professor Award, Karolinska Institute.
- 2010 – Lifetime Honorary Member, Oxygen Club of California.
- 2017 – Oxygen Club of California–Jarrow Formulas Health Sciences Prize, awarded with a medal and a US$25,000 prize. Cadenas, Enrique; Sies, Helmut (2023). "Lester Packer: On His Life and His Legacy". Antioxidants & Redox Signaling. doi:10.1089/ars.2022.0097.
- 2026 – Basic Science Award, Society for Free Radical Research – Europe.

== Private life and artistic work ==
Arnér is the son of Swedish writer Sivar Arnér (1909–1997) and the Hungarian-born artist and author Lenke Rothman (1929–2008). He has created several installations, seminars and publications with the conceptual artist Per Hüttner: Begrepp – En samling and (In)Visible Dialogues.

== Publications ==
- Publication list in PubMed
- Profile in Google Scholar
- Arnér entry in ORCID

Collaborative works with Per Hüttner:

- (In)Visible Dialogues, 2011, languages: English and Swedish, 240 pages, design by Åbäke. Published by Dent-de-Leone. ISBN 978-91-978934-3-5 and ISBN 978-0-9561885-5-7
- Begrepp - En samling, 1992, ed. P. Huttner and E. Arnér with texts by Erna Möller, Rolf Luft, Lenke Rothman, Lennart Wetterberg and Lars Olson, published by Royal Institute of Art in Stockholm.
