= Gwangju Biennale =

Contemporary art biennale

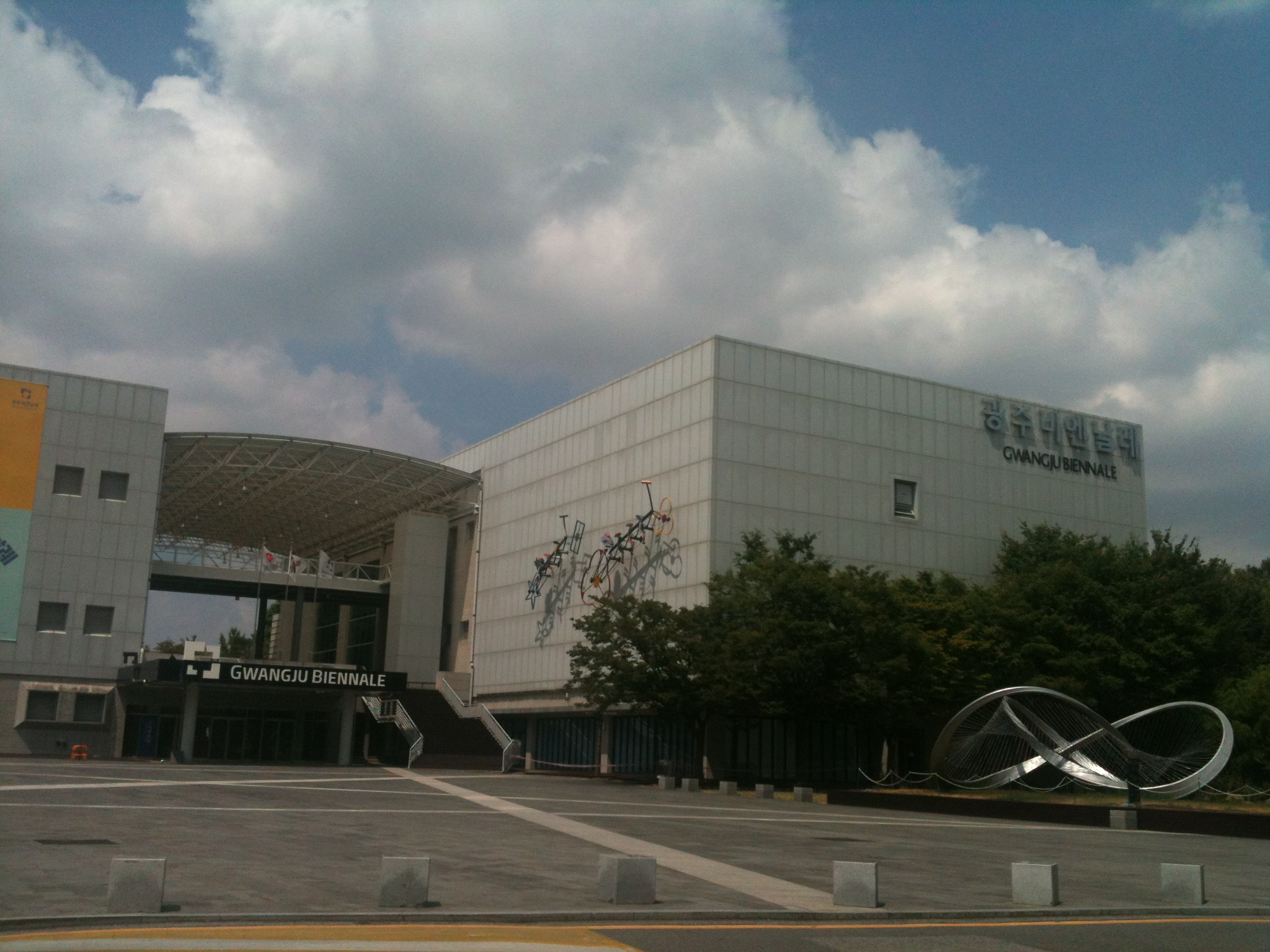
Gwangju Biennale Exhibition

The Gwangju Biennale is a contemporary art biennale founded in September 1995 in Gwangju, South Jeolla province, South Korea. The Biennale is curated by both Korean and International curators and art critics and is hosted by the Gwangju Biennale Foundation and the city of Gwangju. The Gwangju Biennale Foundation also hosts the Gwangju Design Biennale, founded in 2004.

In 2026, the Chinese government compelled Chinese artists to boycott the event due to the use of the name "Taiwan Pavilion" to represent Taiwan’s National Taiwan Museum of Fine Arts.

== History ==
- 1995: Beyond Borders
- 1997: Unmapping the Earth
- 2000: Man and Space
- 2002: P_A_U_S_E
- 2004: A Grain of Dust A Drop of Water
- 2006: Fever Variations
- 2008: On the Road / Position Papers / Insertions
- 2010: 10,000 LIVES
- 2012: ROUNDTABLE
- 2014: Burning Down the House, curated by Jessica Morgan, Fatoş Üstek and Emiliano Valdes
- 2016: The Eighth Climate (What does art do?)
- 2018: Imagined Borders
- 2021: Minds Rising Spirits Tuning, curated by Defne Ayas and Natasha Ginwala
- 2023: Soft and Weak Like Water, curated by Sook-Kyung Lee, Kerryn Greenberg, Sooyoung Leam and Harry C. H. Choi
- 2024: Pansori, a soundscape of the 21st century, curated by Nicolas Bourriaud
- 2026: You Must Change Your Life, directed by Ho Tzu Nyen with assistant curation by Che Kyongfa, Park Gahee, and Brian Kuan Wood
