= Nathalia Edenmont =

Swedish-Ukrainian photo-based artist

Nathalia Edenmont, née Nathalie Nicole Edenmont, (born 7 February 1970 in Yalta, Soviet Union) is a Swedish-Ukrainian photo-based artist who moved to Sweden and Stockholm in 1991. Edenmont studied art, music and ballet at an art school for children in Yalta. Both her parents died while she was a teenager, but she continued to study in a Kyiv state school for artists and also studied in Simferopol. She moved to Stockholm in 1991, and studied graphic design at Forsbergs skola. While Edenmont paints portraits of people in a style reminiscent of classical paintings, she is better known for her use of dead animals and animal parts in her photographs. She has had exhibitions in London, New York, Berlin and Moscow.

Edenmont presented an episode of the Sveriges Radio show Sommar i P1 on 23 June 2014.
