= Dinu Li =

Photographer and multimedia artist (born 1965)

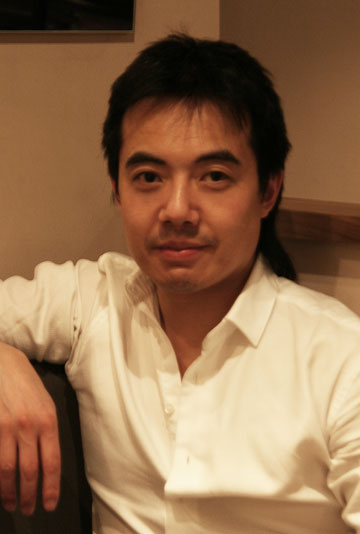
Li, 2017

Dinu Li (born 1966) is a Hong Kong/British photographer and multimedia artist. His publication The Mother of All Journeys was shortlisted for the 2007 Rencontres d'Arles Photobook Award. His work has been included in numerous publications, such as The Chinese Art Book showcasing artworks by two hundred significant Chinese artists since the Shang Dynasty.

== Life and influences ==
Li was born in 1965, moving with his parents from Hong Kong to England, first to Sheffield and then to Manchester. Weekly school trips to the Whitworth Art Gallery in Manchester, sparked his interest in historical paintings, especially Vermeer and influences his work to this day.

His interest in photography dates back to childhood hours spent re-arranging and fictionalising family photographs on his mother's dressing table. In his twenties he was inspired by Exiles by Josef Koudelka and In Flagrante by Chris Killip.

His process typically involves travelling to a destination to develop a project, researching its history and other relevant information. This research becomes an element within the piece, generating new perceptions by creating patterns, repetitions, and compositions.

== Themes and techniques ==
Migrations, the representation of people who normally avoid identification, and the untrustworthiness of human and photographic memory, are some of Li's ongoing themes.

Translations, the re-presentation of texts, graphic images, architecture, film and photography, and the staging of conflicting interpretations of events, are typical techniques.

=== Migrations ===
In his series of fourteen portraits Press The Star, Then Say Hello (2006) Li photographed customers of high-street internet booths in Manchester as they phoned 'home' abroad, their bodies in one space and their minds elsewhere. For his photobook The Mother of All Journeys (2003–2007), Li travelled with his elderly mother back to all her previous homes, in the UK, Hong Kong, and rural China, reflecting on the part photography plays in the construction of personal memory.

=== Re-presentations ===
In his photographic series Secret Shadows (2002) Li created 'portraits' of illegal migrants working in London's Chinese restaurant trade, through images of their possessions and living quarters. In We Write Our Own History (2017) he collaborated with political activists unable to safely reveal their identities, who restaged their unofficial, alternative memories of the 2014 Umbrella protests by arranging everyday items on table tops.

=== Memory and translation ===
The Anatomy of Place (2007–2017) is a trilogy of films consisting of Ancestral Nation, 2007, Family Village, 2009, and Nation Family, 2017, three alternative translations of the Chinese written word 'country'.

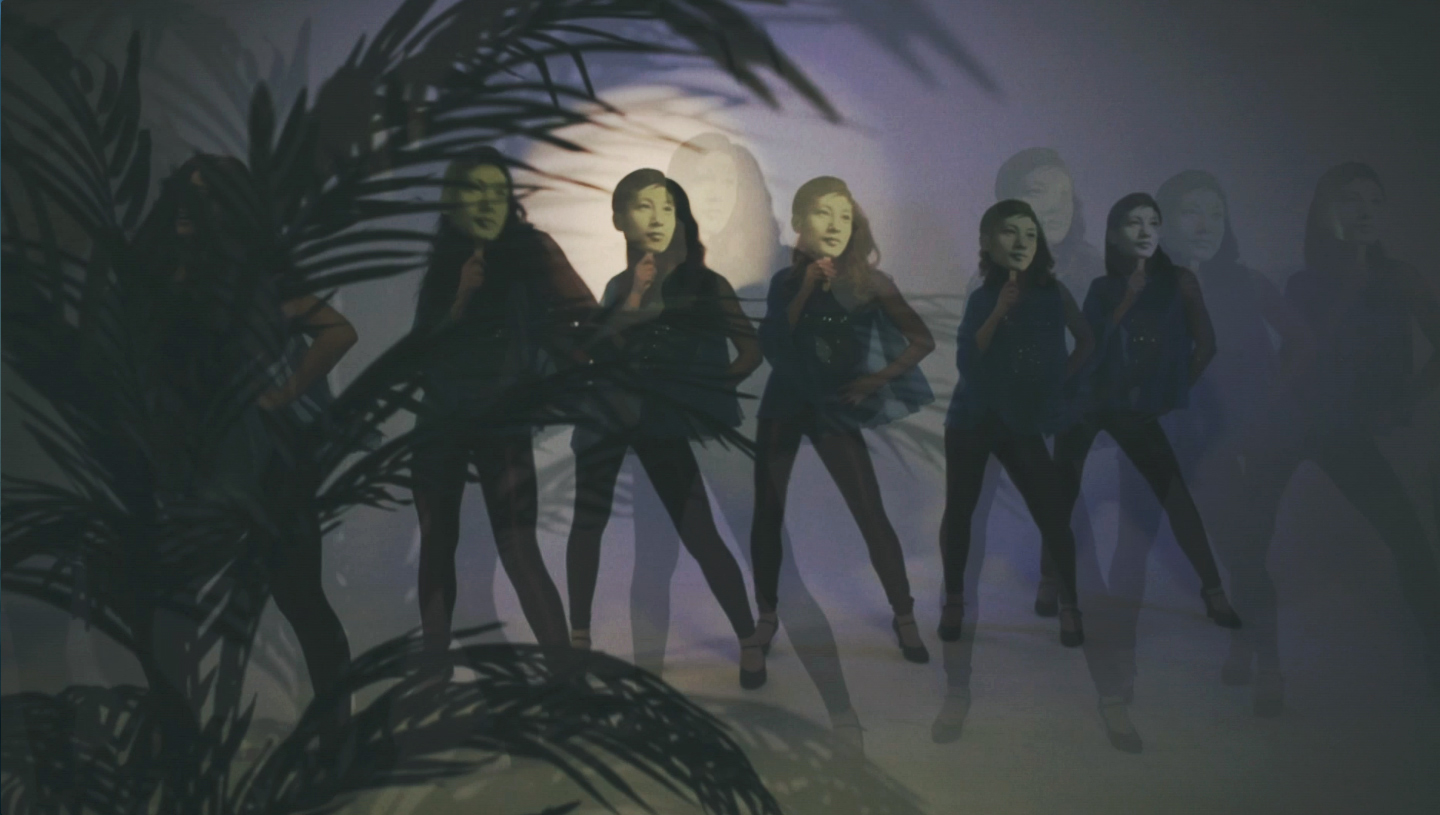
Video still of Nation Family (2017). Single channel video installation

The animation Family Village was inspired by a newspaper article about a Sichuan town built in the style of Dorchester, England, an architectural translation from one vernacular to another. Li sourced a 1950s cartoon story book about a heroic Communist boy who intercepted enemy soldiers, creating an altered narrative overlaid with children chanting the song Pure Imagination from the film Willy Wonka & the Chocolate Factory in Mandarin. In Nation Family, Li constructed a fictional narrative inspired by an actual relative's time working in a Cultural Revolution labour camp. Li shows family photographs that are in fact propaganda, and he manipulates and translates film, props and songs into different media or visual languages.

== Publications ==
- Li, Dinu (2009). Family Village. Bournemouth, UK: The Arts Institute at Bournemouth. ISBN 978-0-901196-34-7..
- Kwok, Ying (2008). 21: Discussions with Artists of Chinese descent in the UK. Manchester, United Kingdom: Chinese Arts Centre. ISBN 978-0-9545440-4-1..
- Li, Dinu (2007). Mother of all Journeys. Stockport, United Kingdom: Dewi Lewis Publishing. ISBN 978-1-904587-41-5..
- Keen, Melanie; Day, Eileen (2005), Necessary Journeys, London, United Kingdom: Arts Council England with Black World, ISBN 0-7287-1112-5.
- The Chinese Art Book. London: Phiadon. 2003. ISBN 978-0-7148-6575-1..
- Grennan, Simon; Li, Dinu (27 July 2003). As If I Were a River & Immaculate Drowning : Photography & Video Installation. Manchester, United Kingdom: Commissions in the Environment. ISBN 978-0-9545297-0-3..
- Ten Thousand Li – Chinese Infusion in Contemporary British Culture. Liverpool, United Kingdom: Centre for Art International Research. 2002. ISBN 0-9523161-9-6..
- Li, Dinu (1997). Bohemia. Manchester, United Kingdom: Viewpoint Photography Gallery. ISBN 0-9523161-9-6..

== Exhibitions ==
He has had solo exhibitions across the UK, including The Anatomy of Place, London, 2018, Age of Transition, Bedford, 2005, As If I were a River, Manchester, 2005 and Treasured Island, An Tobar, The Isle of Mull, 2001. His work has been exhibited internationally, including at the Venice Biennale, Italy, 2009 the 3rd Bucharest Biennale, Romania; Contact FotoFest 05, Canada; The Map: Navigating the Present, Bildmuseet, Sweden, 2008; Contemporary Chinese Photography, Oldenburger Kunstverein, Germany, 2010; PhotoIreland, Irish Museum of Modern Art, Ireland, 2012; Family Stories, White Space 798, China, 2004; The Mother of All Journeys, Victoria and Albert Museum, UK, 2009; The Map: Navigating the Present, Konsthall C, Sweden, 2009; The Problem of Asia, Para/Site Art Space HK at Chalk Horse, Australia, 2010; Liminal Britain, San Antonio Art Gallery, USA, 2006; Tashkent Biennale 2007, Uzbekistan; and the Dong Gang International Photography Festival, Korea, 2015. Li has also curated exhibitions including Make it a Better Place at the Holden Gallery, Manchester, in 2007, and the touring exhibition Home, 2004 with the Chinese Arts Centre.
