= Lenke Rothman =

Swedish artist (1929–2008)

- Born: 28 March 1929; Kiskunfélegyháza, Hungary
- Died: 27 November 2008 (aged 79); Lidingö, Sweden
- Citizenship: Hungarian; Swedish (1954–)
- Education: Konstfack; Accademia di Belle Arti Legalmente Riconosciuta di Ravenna
- Occupations: Artist, painter, writer
- Years active: 1940s–2008
- Spouse(s): Herman Abrahamsson (m. 1954; div. 1958) Sivar Arnér (m. 1959; died 1997)
- Partner: Jan Lundvik (1998–2008)
- Children: Elias Arnér

Lenke Rothman (28 March 1929 – 27 November 2008) was a Swedish artist, painter, and writer. She was born to a Jewish family in Hungary, and was imprisoned in Auschwitz in 1944-1945. After her rescue, she was sent to Sweden, where she was hospitalized until 1951.

After her release from the hospital, she attended art school in Stockholm from 1951 to 1955, and the Accademia di Belle Arti, Ravenna, Italy, in 1956 and 1957. In art school, she met and shared an apartment with author and future Nobel-Prize winner Nelly Sachs, who like her was a Jewish Holocaust survivor. They remained close friends all their life, and Rothman met her husband, Sivar Arnér, through Sachs.

Her works were exhibited at the Malmö Konsthall in 1989, the Göteborgs Konsthall in 1990, the Gothenburg Museum of Art in 1995, the Dunker Culture House in 2008, and the Sörmland Museum in 2018. Her works are a part of the collections of the Museum of Modern Art today.

She was a member of the Swedish Royal Academy of Fine Arts since 1976.

In 2008, she died of Leukemia.

== Publications ==
- Rothman, Lenke (1995). Lenke Rothman. Stockholm: Arena. ISBN 91-7843-074-7.
- Rothman, Lenke (2001). Stygn. Hedemora: Gidlund. ISBN 91-7844-350-4.
- Rothman, Lenke (2018). Att hopfoga den sönderfallande världen = Mending a broken world. Nyköping: Sörmlands Museum.
