= Lynne Marsh =

Canadian artist

Lynne Marsh (born 1969) is a Canadian artist. She was born in Vancouver, British Columbiaand currently lives and works in Los Angeles.

Marsh is primarily known for her work in the fields of photography and video. Her work is included in the collections of the National Gallery of Canada and the Musée national des beaux-arts du Québec.

In 2021, UCR Arts hosted “Lynne Marsh: Who Raised It Up So Many Times?” which was Marsh's first "comprehensive U.S. solo exhibition." In 2022, her work entitled Atlas_ (2021) was included in the exhibition "I don't know you like that: The Bodywork of Hospitality"] curated by Sylvie Fortin for the University at Buffalo Art Galleries.
