= (In)Visible Dialogues =

Art project

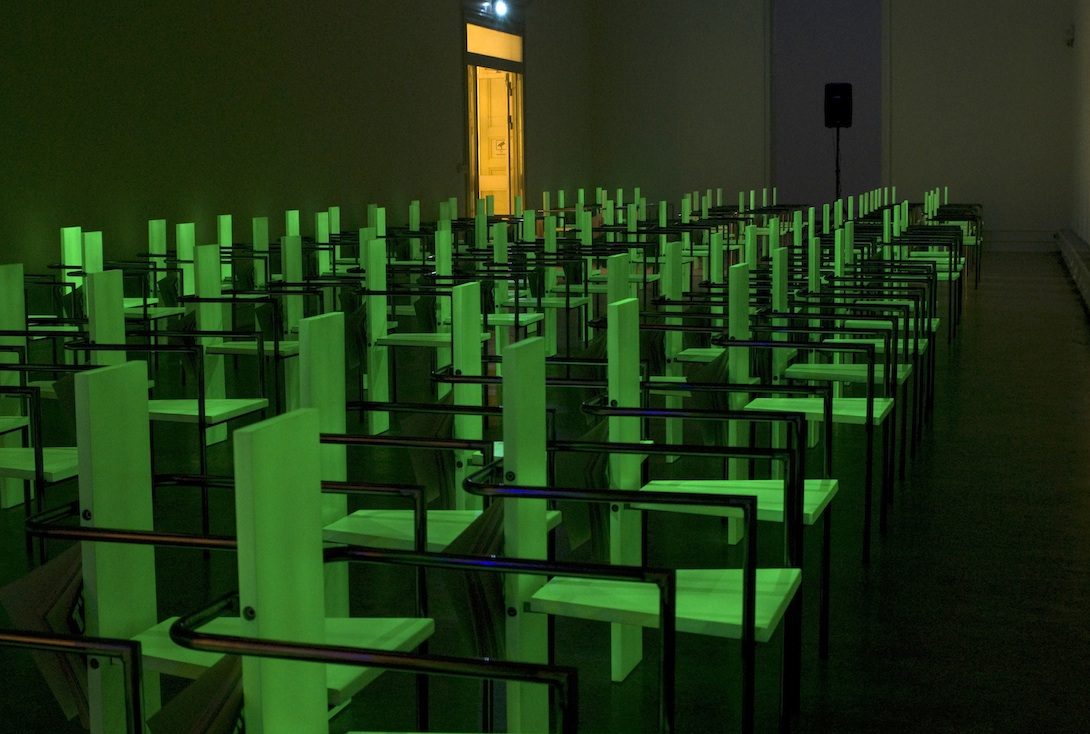
(In)visible Dialoguges, 2011, phosphorescent copies of J. Bolin's Chairs with catalogue, created by Abake (night)

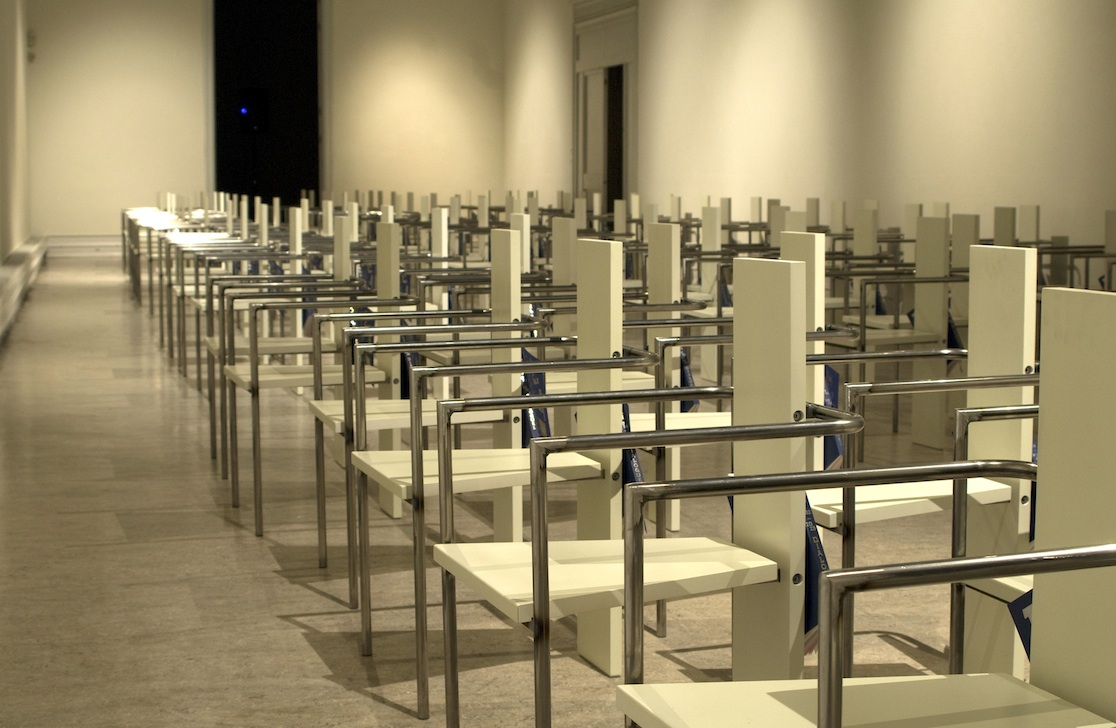
(In)visible Dialoguges, phosphorescent copies of J. Bolin's Chairs with catalogue, created by Abake 2011 (day)

(In)visible Dialogues was an art project realized at the Royal Academy of Fine Arts in Stockholm in 2011. It was initiated by artist Per Huttner and biochemist Elias Arnér. The project was transgressing the boundaries of exhibition, publication and lectures in order to stimulate dialogues between art and science. The project was a sequel to the project Begrepp – En samling from 1992 and drew on Hüttner's experiences from projects like I am a Curator and Democracy and Desire.

(In)Visible Dialogues was installed in three interconnected rooms. In the first, there were 120 fluorescent chairs facing a blank wall. On the back of each chair a copy of the project's catalogue had been nailed and officially signed by a Professor from Karolinska Institutet and approved for publication, following local academic protocol. Each chair was an authorized copy of Jonas Bohlin's Concrete from 1980 that had been customized by the design group Åbäke.

The two flanking side rooms remained empty apart from a solitary lectern painted in the same color as the chairs and which was connected to speakers that emitted music and sounds composed by participating sound artists Andy Cox and Richard Allalouf, Natalia Kamia, Samon Takahashi, Ebbot Lundberg and Yan Jun who interpreted a text written by Hüttner and Arnér on the importance and difficulty of dialogues between art and science. A new sound piece was played back each week. Lundberg's contribution, There's Only One of Us Here was released in 2012 – his first solo album in a 25-year career.

At 2pm, every Sunday in March 2011, a dialogue took place. The dialogues were devised so that a member of the scientific community dialogued with a member of the world of visual art. The audience could not see the two dialoguing people, who could not see each other either.

== Dialogue schedule ==
6 March 2011 – Probing the Boundaries of Performance

Predrag Petrovic, M.D. Ph.D., Department of Clinical Neuroscience, Karolinska Institutet, Stockholm

and

A Constructed World, Artists, Jacqueline Riva MFA and Geoff Lowe Ph.D., Ecole Supérieure des Beaux-Arts d'Angers, Angers

13 March 2011 – Probing the Boundaries of Insight

Konrad Kaufmann, Ph.D., Max-Planck-Institut für biophysikalische Chemie, Göttingen

and

Arijana Kajfes, Artist, Stockholm, Sweden

20 March 2011 – Probing the Boundaries of Talent

Sandra Masur, Ph.D, Professor, Mount Sinai School of Medicine, Department of Ophthalmology, New York City

and

Laurent Devèze, Philosopher, Art Critic and Director of École Régional de Beaux Arts, Besançon

27 March 2011 – Probing the Boundaries of the Mind

Veronique Wiesinger, Curator and director for Alberto and Annette Giacometti Foundation, Paris

and

Hugo Lagercrantz, MD PhD, Professor, Karolinska Institutet, Astrid Lindgren Children's Hospital, Stockholm
