= Pauline Curnier Jardin =

Visual artist

Pauline Curnier Jardin (born 1980, Marseille, France) is a visual artist working mainly in film, installation, performance and drawing. She lives in Rome and Berlin. In her work, Curnier Jardin has revisited Joan of Arc, Bernadette Soubirous, the Goddess Demeter, the birth of Jesus and his saint Family, the Anatomical theatre of the Renaissance, as well as pagan and catholic rites in Central and Southern Europe. In 2019 she was awarded the Preis der Nationalgalerie.

== Early life and education ==
Curnier Jardin studied fine art at École Nationale des Beaux Arts de Paris-Cergy and film studies at École nationale supérieure des arts décoratifs, Paris. Together with Maeva Cunci, Virginie Thomas et Aude Lachaise she founded the dada-femme Cabaret group "Les Vraoums".

== Career ==
She was a visiting tutor at Kunsthochschule Kassel and at the Dutch Art Institute where she led the seminar "Opera Corruption" together with the art organization If I can't Dance, I Cannot be a Part of your Revolution and curator Sara Giannini. Since 2020 Curnier Jardin has been tutor at De Ateliers in Amsterdam.

In 2020, together with Alexandra Lopez and Serena Olcuire, she initiated the Feel Good Cooperative, a cooperative of sex-workers in Rome.

In the film-work Grotta Profunda, les humeurs de gouffre, the moody chasm (2011) Curnier Jardin explores the life of Bernadette Soubirous (Maria Bernada Sobeirons), the Pyrenean visionary, who on 11 February 1858 claimed she saw a young girl in a cave at Massabielle.

Her subsequent film Grotta Profunda, les humeurs du gouffre was exhibited as part of the installation Grotta Profunda Approfundita at the 57th Venice Biennale.

Her film Qu'un Sang Impur, a loose remake of Jean Genet's "Un Chant d'Amour", was commissioned for the Bergen Assembly Triennal and later exhibited at the Hamburger Bahnhof, installed in the Hot Flashes Forest, an immersive installation thought to combine a multiple of works that deal with reproductive idea of the woman's body.

As the winner of the Preis der Nationalgalerie 2019, Curnier Jardin presented the extensive video installation Fat to Ashes at Hamburger Bahnhof - Museum für Gegenwart, Berlin, in 2021. The exhibition was centred on the filmic work «Fat to Ashes» which combines 3 storylines: a religious festival in honour of St. Agatha, the slaughter of a pig, and the carnival in Cologne.

A large-scale amphitheatre encompasses the film installation as the centre of the spectacle, and thus transformations, processions, and practised performance in ritualised excess are the content and formal attributes of Curnier Jardin's Fat to Ashes.

== Awards and residencies (selection) ==
- 2018 Dutch prize NN Award
- 2017 laureate of the Prix Fondation d'Entreprise Ricard
- 2019 Preis der Nationalgalerie

== Collections (selection) ==
- National Gallery Berlin – Collection for contemporary art
- Fonds régional d'art contemporain Limousin
- Centraal Museum Utrecht
- La collection du Musée national d'art moderne – Centre Pompidou

== Solo exhibitions (selection) ==
- 2021
  - Fat to Ashes, Preis Der Nationalgalerie - Hamburger Bahnhof, Berlin, DE
  - CRAC Occitanie/Pyrénnées - Méditerannée, Sète, FR
  - Index Stockholm, SE
- 2019
  - I still send you a lot of affection and I kiss you through my denture, 1646, The Hague, NL
  - Parties sans éteindre les lumières, Fondation Ricard pour l'Art Contemporain, Paris, FR
- 2018
  - Sebastiano Blu, Tomaskerk, Amsterdam, NL (performance)
  - Den Frie Centre of Contemporary Art, Copenhagen, DK
  - You think you are within in me now, KRIEG, Hasselt, BE
- 2017
  - Ellen de Bruijne Projects, Amsterdam, NL Amsterdam.
- 2016
  - Le Granit, Scène Nationale de Belfort, Belfort, FR
  - The Shower of Sister Bondage, Ellen de Bruijne Projects, Amsterdam, NL
  - Blutbad Parade, Théâtre Nanterre-Amandiers, Paris, FR.
- 2015
  - The Resurrection Plot, Performa 15, Pioneer Works, New-York, US
  - Parade-Bain-de-Sang, Soirées Nomades, Fondation Cartier pour l'art contemporain, Paris, FR.
- 2014
  - Mémoires Perdues, Europäische Kulturtage Karlsruhe, Karlsruhe, DE
  - MIT List Visual Arts Center, Cambridge, US
  - Viola Melon, Baiser Melocoton, Galerie Edouard Manet, Gennevilliers, FR
- 2013
  - Art Berlin Contemporary (ABC), Berlin, DE
  - Viola Melon, Baiser Melocoton, PSM Gallery, Berlin, DE.
- 2012
  - Crèche Vivante, Fondation Cartier pour l'art contemporain, Paris, FR;
  - The Mysteries of Creation without Hands, L'Antenne, FRAC Ile-de-France, Paris, FR.
