= IASPIS =

IASPIS, The International Artists Studio Program in Stockholm, is a cultural exchange program financed by the Swedish Government.

IASPIS facilitates a creative dialogue between visual artists in Sweden and other countries. IASPIS encompasses an international studio program in Sweden, a support structure for exhibitions and residencies abroad for Swedish-based artists, as well as seminars, exhibitions and publications. IASPIS is administratively a branch of the Swedish Government Commission for Arts Grants.
