= Jacqueline Morreau =

American artist

Under the Sea – Three Fates (1989) by Jacqueline Morreau

Jacqueline Morreau (18 October 1929 – 13 July 2016) was an American artist.

== Life ==
She was born into a middle-class Jewish family in Milwaukee, Wisconsin. She was the daughter of Eugene Segall, a furniture dealer, and his wife, Jennie (née Horowitz), a milliner. The family moved to Los Angeles in 1943, and at the age of 14 Morreau attended Chouinard Art Institute; in 1946 she won a scholarship to Jepson Art Institute. At that time, the school was dominated by returning servicemen taking advantage of the GI Bill; it was overwhelmingly male. "I was considered a great prodigy. That was very nice, very ego-gratifying. I worked very hard."

In 1949, she spent a year in France and some time in New York City, returning to Los Angeles where she married; her first child was born in 1951. Four years later, she left her husband and, with her son, moved to San Francisco, where she studied medical illustration. She qualified in 1958. These two streams in her education – artistic and anatomical – enabled her to ground in observed reality her more abstract themes: identity, desire, memory, power and resistance.

She married Patrick Morreau in 1959 and had three more children. Of this period of her life, Morreau has written "In 1950s and 60s’ San Francisco, I was doing more printmaking than painting because I did not have a place to paint but I did have an etching press in my garage......There was the Vietnam War and the violence of the civil rights movement in the American South. I couldn't ignore these and my prints reflect my anger and horror. The etchings I made at that time prepared the way for the political triptychs I did later: The Children's Crusade, Lessons of History, and the Gulf War triptych.

In 1967, the family moved to Massachusetts where Morreau found a studio and started painting again, while continuing to develop her printmaking. She exhibited and gained some recognition for her work. When, in 1972, her husband was offered a job in London, she and their children moved with him. She soon began to exhibit, and produced portfolios of prints with publishers such as Paupers Press. Her drawings also appeared on book covers from the Women's Press and Bloodaxe Books, and Scarecrow Press in the US.

However, her primary commitment was to the field of fine art and in 1978 she staged Drawn from Life, an exhibition of figurative drawings and prints at the Women's Arts Alliance in London. Galleries at that time were dominated by conceptual art, colourfield painting and electronic media, and both the mainstream art world and the avant garde rejected figuration. Certain factions within feminism also regarded any direct representation of the female body to be retrogressive. In her view, unity was strength and, together with Cate Elwes, Pat Whiteread and Joyce Agee, she spent two years seeking out female artists working with figuration. The result was Women's Images of Men and About Time, two touring exhibitions commencing at the ICA in London in 1980.

Morreau edited the book of the Images of Men show with the critic Sarah Kent, and continued to exhibit with many other female artists, including Sue Coe, Marisa Rueda and Pam Skelton. She promoted female artists in her work as a curator of the Wales Drawing Biennale and as a trustee of the Rootstein Hopkins Foundation. She also influenced generations of students as a visiting lecturer in drawing at the Royal College of Art, London, and Oxford Brookes University, and at Regent's College, London (now Regent's University), where she was a professor of drawing until 1998. Morreau's vision as an artist is recorded at the British Library's Artists’ Lives archive, and her work is in many private and public collections, including the British Museum, the Arts Council, and the Victoria and Albert Museum.

National Life Stories conducted an oral history interview (C466/135) with Jacqueline Morreau in 2002 for its Artists' Lives collection held by the British Library.

== Career ==
=== Timeline ===
- 1943–1947 attended Susan Miller Dorsey High School and Chouinard Art Institute Los Angeles;
- 1946 began studies with Rico Lebrun at Jepson's Art Institute;
- 1947–1949 Los Angeles City College and Jepson's Art Institute;
- 1949 travelled to Paris and New York; with photographer Elliott Erwitt
- 1950–1951 Los Angeles City College and continued studies at Jepson's; worked with ex-Lebrun students at communal workshops;
- 1953 moved to Berkeley, California;
- 1953–1960 worked as research assistant at University of California for various groups, notably with Dr. Ellsworth, C. Doughery, and Dr. Timothy Leary;
- 1955–1958 University of California Medical School, San Francisco, received a diploma in medical illustration;
- 1959–1967 post-graduate studies in etching with Kathan Brown at Berkeley, and Gordon Cook at San Francisco Art Institute;
- 1967 moved to Massachusetts;
- 1969 lithography studies with Herb Fox, Boston;
- 1972 moved to London;
- 1989 Theatre Design, Royal Academy of Dramatic Arts, London;
- 1989–1995 visiting lecturer in drawing, Oxford Brookes University and Professor of Art, Regent's College, London;
- since 1995 visiting lecturer in drawing, Royal College of Art, London.

=== Feminist art movement ===
Known primarily for her figurative paintings, Jacqueline Morreau's work is often discussed in relation to the feminist art movement. Together with Joyce Agee, Sarah Kent and Pat Whiteread, Morreau organised the touring exhibition 'Women's Images of Men' which opened at the ICA in 1980 and went on to tour across Britain at a number of Galleries including the Arnolfini. Morreau and Kent went on to edit and write the accompanying book.

== Permanent collections ==
- British Museum
- Victoria and Albert Museum
- Tate Collections and Archives
- Arts Council
- Ferens Art Gallery, Hull
- New Hall Art Gallery, Cambridge
- Touchstones Gallery, Rochdale, Greater Manchester
- Middlesbrough Institute of Modern Art, mima
- Manchester City Art Gallery
- Pallaint House Gallery and Museum

== Quotes ==
"We have only a small space of time in which to make our marks on paper and canvas, to effect permanent changes in society before the barbarians once more close in … We must work harder than ever to make what gains we can in the consciousness of civilised people."

== Bibliography ==
Year	Work
1983	Power Plays, exhibition catalogue, introduction by Bryan Biggs and Sarah Kent
1984	Pandora's Box, exhibition catalogue
1984	Paradise Lost, exhibition catalogue, introduction by Sarah Kent, Ikon Gallery
1984	Women in War and Peace, exhibition catalogue, introduction by Moira Kelly University of Houston
1985	Women's Images of Men edited by Sarah Kent and Jacqueline Morreau, Rivers Oram Press/Pandora List
1986	Jacqueline Morreau: Drawings and Graphics, by Sarah Kent, Scarecrow Press
1986	Women Live, video interview, ITV
1987	Framing Feminism, R. Parker and G. Pollack, Pandora, London
1989	Americans Abroad, exhibition catalogue, edited by Stephanie Crawford, introduction by Keith Wheldon
1989	Jacqueline Morreau: Myth and Metaphor, exhibition catalogue, introduction by Keith Wheldon
1989	The Nude: A New Perspective, Gill Saunders, Herbert, London
1990	Paradise Now, exhibition catalogue, Odette Gilbert
1992	The Sexual Imagination, edited by Harrier Gilbert, Jonathan Cape, London
1992	Strategies for Women Artists, Open University programme, BBC
1995	Fold Upon Fold, exhibition catalogue, introduction by Judith Kazantzis, Artemis, London

=== Selected exhibitions ===
Solo exhibitions unless otherwise indicated:

Year	Exhibition
1950	Frank Perls Gallery, Beverly Hills, California, students of Rico Lebrun.
1970	Edna Stebbins Gallery, Cambridge, Massachusetts
1972	Edna Stebbins Gallery, Cambridge, Massachusetts
1978	'Drawn From Life', Women's Arts Alliance, London
1980	Amwell Gallery, London
1982	Pentonville Gallery, London
1983	'Power Plays' with Sue Coe and Marisa Rueda, Pentonville Gallery, London; Bluecoat Gallery, Liverpool; Ferens Art Gallery, Hull
1984	'Paradise Lost', Ikon Gallery, touring with Pam Skelton
1986	'Original Sins', Art Space Gallery, London
1988	'Myth and Metaphor', Art Space Gallery, London, Ferens Art Gallery, Hull
1988	Odette Gilbert Gallery, London
1989	'Three Women' with Sandra Fisher and Haidee Becker, Odette Gilbert Gallery, London
1990	'Paradise Now', Odette Gilbert Gallery, London
1991	'Beyond Reason', with Marisa Rueda, Battersea Arts Centre, London
1992	'Recent Work', Isis Gallery, Essex
1993	'Disclosing Eros', print portfolio, Nuffield College, Oxford,
1994	'Fold Upon Fold', Isis Gallery, Essex
1996	'Themes and Variations', Ferens Art Gallery, Hull
2017	'Re: Jacqueline Morreau Mythologies and the Marginalised', Bow Arts, London

=== Selected group shows ===
Year	Tour
1980	'Women's Images of Men', Institute of Contemporary Art, London and tour
1984	'New Acquisitions', Arts Council Collection tour
1984	'Pandora's Box', Rochdale and tour
1986	'Women in War and Peace', Houston, Texas
1989	'The Nude: A New Perspective', Victoria and Albert Museum, London
1990	'Marks of Tradition', Museum of Modern Art, Oxford
1995	Sharjah International Art Biennial, United Arab Emirates
1997	'From the Interior', UK/China exchange
