= Rona (name) =

Rona is a name. It may refer to:

== Given name ==
- Rona, a diminutive of the Russian male given name Aaron
- Rona Ambrose (born 1969), former interim leader of the Conservative Party of Canada and Leader of the Opposition in the House of Commons
- Rona Anderson (1926–2013), Scottish stage, film, and television actress
- Rona Anggreani (born 1995), Indonesian actress and former member idol group JKT48
- Rona Barrett (born 1936), American gossip columnist and businesswoman
- Rona Coleman (active from 1970s), Australian actress
- Rona Dougall (born late 1960s), Scottish broadcast journalist and television presenter
- Rona Dyer (1923 - 2021), New Zealand artist
- Rona Elliot (born 1947), American music journalist
- Rona Fairhead, (born 1961), British businesswoman and chairwoman of the BBC Trust
- Rona Goffen (1944–2004) American art historian, teacher
- Rona Green (disambiguation), several people
- Rona Hartner (born 1973), Romanian actress, painter and singer
- Rona Hurley (1897–1985), New Zealand tobacco grower and buyer
- Rona Jaffe, (1931–2005), American novelist
  - Rona Jaffe Foundation Writers' Award, awarded annually since 1995 to beginning women writers
- Rona Kenan (born 1979), Israeli singer/songwriter
- Rona E. Kramer (born 1954), American politician from Maryland
- Rona Lightfoot (born 1936), Scottish piper and singer
- Rona Mackay (active from 2016), Scottish politician
- Rona McKenzie (1922–1999), New Zealand female cricketer
- Rona McLeod (active 1990s), Australian TV actress
- Rhona Mitra (born 1975), English actress, model and singer
- Rona Moss-Morris (born before 2006), South African-born academic psychologist
- Rona Munro (born 1959), Scottish writer
- Rona Murray (1924–2003), Canadian poet
- Rona Nishliu (born 1986), Kosovo-Albanian singer and radio presenter
- Rona Pondick (born 1952), American sculptor
- Rona Randall (born 1911, date of death unknown), British writer
- Rona Robinson, British suffragette who in 1905 was the first woman in the United Kingdom to gain a first-class degree in chemistry
- Rona Rupert (1934–1995), South African author
- Rona Shapiro (born before 1990), American rabbi, the first female rabbi to head a Conservative synagogue in Cleveland
- Rona Stevenson (1911–1988), New Zealand politician
- Rona Tarin (born 1971), Afghan politician and women's rights activist
- Rona Tietje (born 1981), German politician
- Rona Tong (1916–2016), New Zealand track and field athlete who competed at the 1938 British Empire Games
- Rona Yefman (born 1972), Israeli artist based in New York City

== Surname ==
- Aliye Rona (1921–1996), Turkish film actress
- András Róna-Tas (born 1931), Hungarian historian and linguist
- Andrew Rona (born 1971), American film producer and movie executive
- Curtis Rona (born 1992), New Zealand professional rugby league footballer
- Elizabeth Rona (1890–1981), Hungarian nuclear chemist
- Gianarrigo Rona (born 1940), Italian bridge player and administrator, president of the World Bridge Federation from 2010
- Jaroslav Róna (born 1957), Czech sculptor, painter, actor, educator, and writer
- Jeff Rona (born 1957), American film composer
- József Róna (1861–1939), Hungarian sculptor and artist
- Mohammad Rona (born 1985), Afghan-born Danish politician
- Peter A. Rona (1934–2014), American oceanographer
- Thomas P. Rona (1923–1997), American science adviser to the Defense Department and the White House under Presidents Reagan and George H. W. Bush
