= Sarah Kent =

British journalist (born 1947)

Sarah Kent (born 1947) is a British art critic, formerly art editor of the weekly London "what's on" guide Time Out. She was an early supporter of the Young British Artists in general, and Tracey Emin in particular, helping Emin to get exposure. This has led to polarised reactions of praise and opposition for Kent. She adopts a feminist stance and has stated her position to be that of "a spokesperson, especially for women artists, in a country that is essentially hostile to contemporary art."

== Career ==
Kent studied painting at the Slade School of Art and worked as an artist until 1977. She then became Exhibitions Director at the Institute of Contemporary Arts (ICA) for two years, and also started writing for Time Out. At the ICA she staged exhibitions by Andy Warhol, Allen Jones and Christo, as well as feminist artist Alexis Hunter. Another show was of satirical art, Berlin a Critical View: Ugly Realism. Her own work changed from painting to photography, primarily of male nudes.

She became art editor of Time Out, for which she wrote reviews. She is now a well-known figure in the arts in London, and has appeared on radio and TV shows. She also works in a freelance capacity as an editor and critic, and has provided essays, catalogues and books for the Saatchi Gallery and White Cube gallery. She is the editor of Shark-Infested Waters: The Saatchi Collection of British Art in the 90s (Zwemmer, 1994).

She was an early advocate for the Young British Artists (YBAs), also known as Britart, and a strong supporter of Tracey Emin, helping to get her early exposure. Kent and Matthew Collings have been described as "the parents of the popularization process having audiences approaching half a million each" of "the explosion of art into mainstream culture in nineties London."

Advocating Britart, she is on the opposite side of the fence from the traditionally oriented critic, Brian Sewell. This had led to personal comments in the media. In 1995, when asked about a suitable Christmas present for him (he keeps dogs), she replied:

I'd like to give him a large tank of formaldehyde in which he can pickle his bitches

Eight years later Sewell commented in one of his articles, referring to a heart operation:

I have made several wills, the first as a young soldier, all of them the precautionary wills of those who do not think of death as immediately relevant. Even on the night before my rib-cage was sawn open and my heart re-plumbed I was prepared to make a joke and bequeathed my eyes to Sarah Kent, the gushing art critic of Time Out, who is not blind but cannot see.

She is also mentioned in the lyrics to The Turner Prize Song Art or Arse? – You be the judge, written and performed by Billy Childish, on a Stuckists CD:

Damien Hirst got his fish in a tank
some say it's art others think it's wank
Sarah Kent says he's doing quite well
you gotta make your art and you gotta sell

The reactions to her mirror the divisions in contemporary art in Britain, and she is praised as a pioneer by Louisa Buck:

Sarah Kent has been an energetic chronicler of the contemporary, hoofing off to the most obscure and inaccessible venues long before it became fashionable for art to be exhibited in unusual places, and championing both young artists and writers at the beginning of their careers ... on television and radio she is often pitched against more conservative elements as an animated advocate of the wilder shores of today's art.

In 1992, she was a jurist on the Turner Prize panel chaired by Sir Nicholas Serota. The other members were Marie-Claude Beaud, Director, Foundation Cartier pour l'art contemporain, Paris, Robert Hopper, Director, Henry Moore Sculpture Trust, and Howard Karshan. The winner was Grenville Davey, and the other nominees Damien Hirst, David Tremlett and Alison Wilding.

Since November 2010 she contributes regularly to the arts desk: Sarah Kent author page on the arts desk website

== Judgements ==
- On Gary Wragg (1983):

Gary Wragg’s huge terra cotta canvases stand out. Sketchy areas of black, white and grey create ambiguously transparent readings of space while chalk and paint lines suggest diagrammatic representations- perhaps of Tai Chi movements

- On Sarah Lucas (1994):

an aesthetic terrorist, pillaging mainstream culture. In doing so she acts as a mirror, monitoring the sexism and misogyny routinely found there.

- On Simon Patterson (1996):

His work is like the physical embodiment of ruminative thought-conceptual art made concrete.

- On Jim Shaw's "thrift store" show (2000):

Critics professing to be gobsmacked by these efforts can never have seen an amateur art show or walked along the railings of the Bayswater road. They should get out more.

== Literature ==
- Author: Sarah Kent. Hayward Annual Arts Council of Great Britain 1978. ISBN 0-7287-0178-2
- Author: Floris M Neusüs. Fotografie als Kunst, Kunst als Fotografie. DuMont, 1979, ISBN 3-7701-1129-X Sarah Kent: Photography Social and Sensual.
- Editor: Claus Honnef. Lichtbildnisse: das Porträt in der Fotografie. Rheinland-Verlag, 1982, ISBN 3-7927-0661-X Sarah Kent: Photography Revelation of Transformation
- Author: Sarah Kent. Jacqueline Morreau: Drawings and Graphics. Scarecrow Press, 1986, ISBN 0-8108-1888-4
- Author: Gerry Badger, John Benton-Harris. Through the Looking Glass. Barbican, London, 1989, ISBN 0-85331-560-4 Sarah Kent: Taking Issue: Artists as Photographers
- Author: Sarah Kent, Jacqueline Morreau. Women's Images of Men. Pandora Press, 1990, ISBN 0-04-440461-1
- Author: Sarah Kent, Jean Fisher, John Roberts, Brandon Taylor. Lifelines/Lebenslinien. Tate Liverpool/BASF Ludwigshafen, 1990, ISBN 3-926138-09-2
- Author: Sarah Kent. James Cotier: Nudes in Budapest, Aktok, 1992, ISBN 0-9518630-0-2
- Author: Sarah Kent. Shark-Infested Waters: The Saatchi Collection of British Art in the 90s . Zwemmer, London, 1994 and Philip Wilson Publishers, London, 2003, ISBN 0-85667-584-9
- Author: Sarah Kent. Eyewitness Art: Composition. DK ADULT, 1995, ISBN 1-56458-612-X
- Author: Sarah Kent, Stephan Balkenhol. Stephan Balkenhol: Sculptures 1988-1996 in the Saatchi Collection. Saatchi Gallery, 1996, ISBN 0-9527453-1-3
- Author: Sarah Kent, John McEwen. Paula Rego: The Dancing Ostriches from Disney's "Fantasia". Saatchi Gallery, 1996, ISBN 0-9527453-2-1
- Author: Sarah Kent. Fiona Rae Gary Hume. Saatchi Gallery, 1997, ISBN 0-9527453-3-X
- Author: Brian Robertson, Sarah Kent, Peter Schaffer. Elisabeth Frink: Sculpture. Harpvale Books, 1985, ISBN 0-946425-05-1 / 094642506X / 0946425078
- Editor Frank Broughton. Time Out Interviews 1968-98. Penguin Books, 1998, ISBN 0-14-027963-6 Sarah Kent interviews with Joseph Beuys, Gilbert & George, Madonna, Tracey Emin, Damien Hirst
- Author: Sarah Kent, Richard Cork, Dick Price. Young British Art: The Saatchi Decade. Boothe-Clibborn Editions, 1999, ISBN 1-86154-033-7. *Author: Sarah Kent, Neal Brown. Tracey Emin. Galgiani, Phillip, 1998, ISBN 0-9522690-2-3
- Editor Hilary Robinson. Feminism-Art-Theory. Blackwell, 2001, ISBN 0-631-20850-X Sarah Kent: Susan Hiller: Anthropology into Art
- Author: Sarah Kent. Darren Lago & Co: Objects of Desire. The New Art Gallery, Walsall, 2001, ISBN 0-946652-58-9
- Author: Sarah Kent, Will Self, Cathy Courtney, Jo Self. Flowers: Jo Self. Frances Lincoln, 2003, ISBN 0-7112-2219-3
- Editor Joe Kerr, Andrew Gibson. London from Punk to Blair. Reaktion Books, 2003, ISBN 1-86189-171-7 Sarah Kent: Groundswell
- Author: Sarah Kent, David Batchelor. Pedro Cabrito Reis: Border Crossings. Haunch of Venison, London/Zurich, 2005, ISBN 1-905620-00-4
- Author: Sarah Kent. Uwe Wittwer – Hail and Snow. Haunch of Venison, Zurich / London, 2007, ISBN 978-1-905620-17-3
- Author: Sarah Kent. Jessica Rankin: So Many Echoes of Echoes. White Cube, 2007, ISBN 1-906072-03-5/ 978-1-906072-03-2
- Editor Jessica Cargill Thompson, Jonathan Derbyshire. London Calling. Time Out Guides Ltd, 2008, ISBN 978-1-84670-109-2 Sarah Kent: the Merry Go Round
- Author: Sarah Kent (Introduction). Demons, Yarns and Tales: Tapestries by Contemporary Artists. Damiani, 2009, ISBN 88-6208-076-X

== See also ==
Other contemporary UK art critics:

- David Lee
- Adrian Searle
- Louisa Buck
- Waldemar Januszczak
- Matthew Collings
- Brian Sewell
