= Felix Weber =

Felix Weber may refer to:

- Felix Weber (songwriter) (born 1960), German songwriter and producer
- Felix Weber (footballer) (born 1995), German footballer
- Felix Weber (artist) (born 1965), multi-disciplinary artist
- Felix Weber (runner), long-distance runner and champion at the 2019 German Athletics Championships
