= Sommer Contemporary Art =

Coordinates: 32.0632°N 34.7706°E

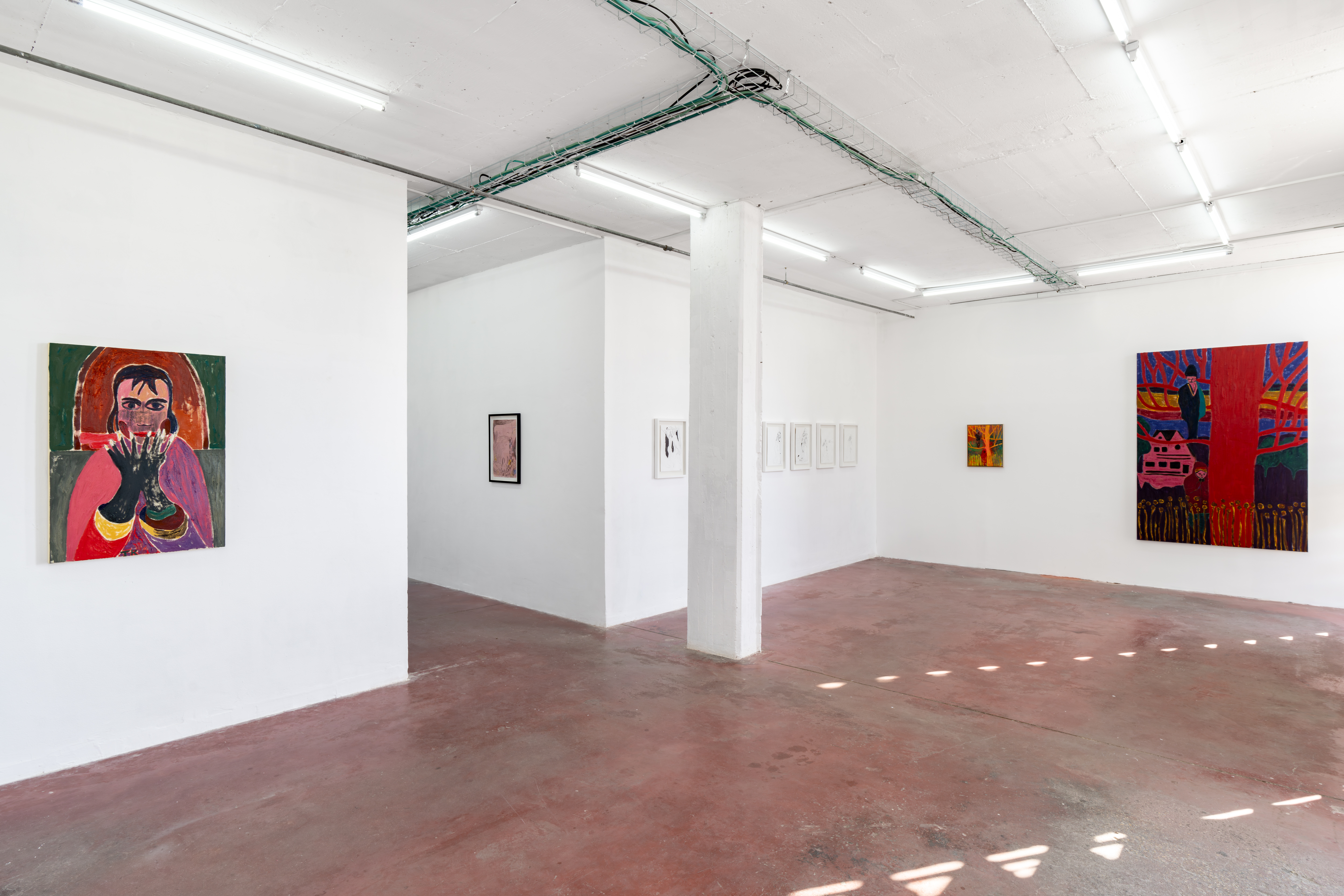
- Sommer Contemporary, Installation view
- Established: 1999
- Location: Hatnufa St. 6, Tel Aviv Yafo, Israel
- Type: Art gallery
- Founder: Irit Fine Sommer
- Website: www.sommergallery.com

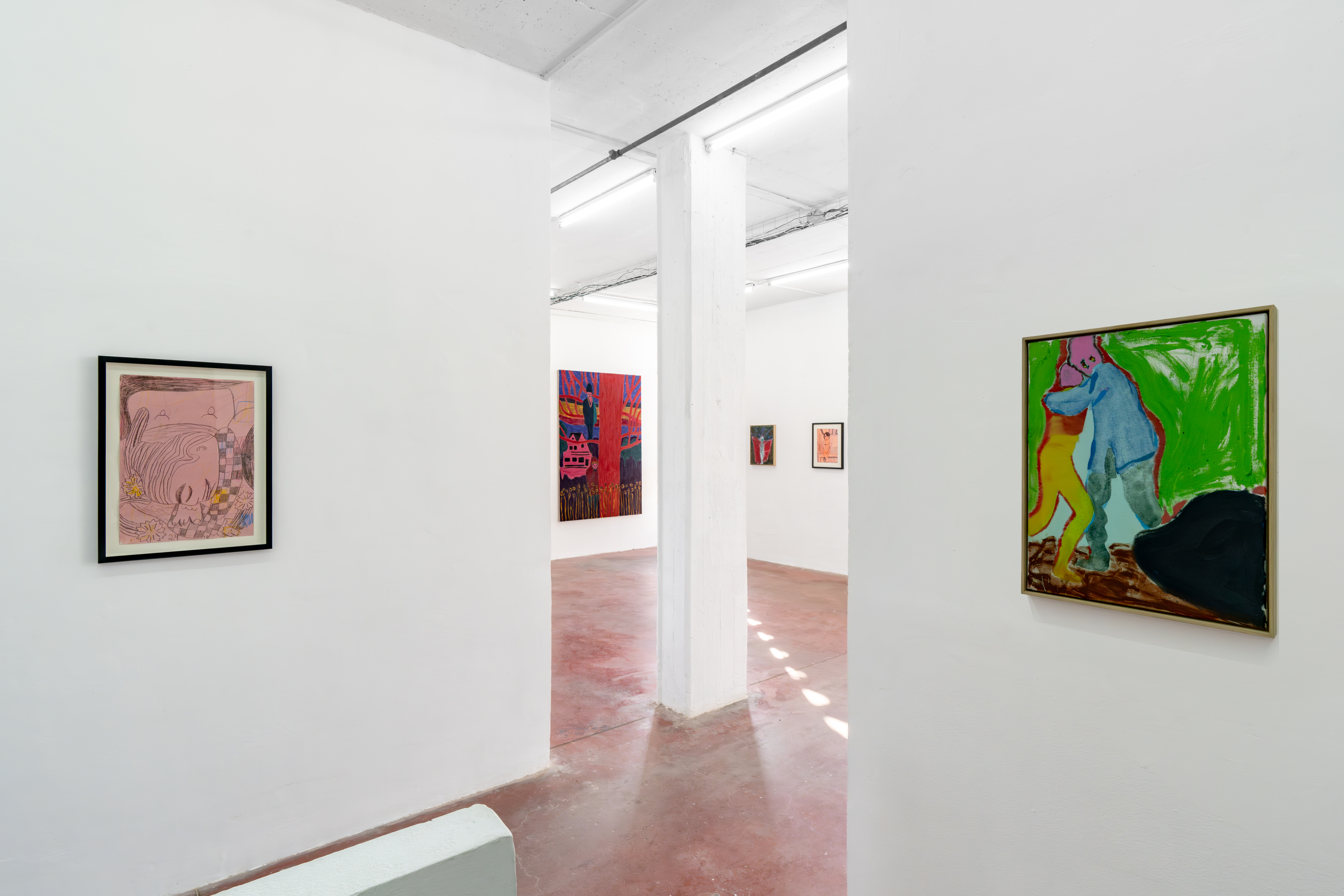
Sommer Contemporary Art, Installation view

Sommer Contemporary Art is a contemporary art gallery, owned by Irit Fine Sommer and based in the neighborhood Shapira, Tel Aviv, Israel.

The gallery is considered to be among the most influential in Israel for contemporary art. It was first established in 1999 at Rothschild Boulevard 64, before relocating in November 2005 to Rothschild 13, within one of Tel Aviv’s historic buildings, noted for its architectural and cultural significance within the city’s urban fabric.

In recent years, the gallery relocated to Kiryat HaMelacha, an area in southern Tel Aviv that has developed into a significant hub for contemporary art, hosting numerous galleries, artist studios, and independent project spaces. This move reflects the gallery’s ongoing engagement with evolving artistic contexts and communities.

Since Sommer Gallery's opening, the purpose of the gallery was the promotion of contemporary Israeli artists in the international art scene, as well as representing and exhibiting international artists in Israel and abroad. Sommer Contemporary Art represents artists such as Yehudit Sasportas, Yael Bartana, Thomas Zipp, Gregor Hildebrandt, and Ugo Rondinone, and has exhibited works by artists including Wolfgang Tillmans and Wilhelm Sasnal.

== Artists ==
Artists shown in the gallery include:

- Saâdane Afif
- Naama Arad
- Yael Bartana
- Guy Ben Ner
- Marion Baruch
- Rineke Dijkastra
- Karl Haendel
- Omer Halperin
- Tamar Harpaz
- Lyle Ashton Harris
- Michal Helfman
- Gregor Hildebrandt
- Chris Martin
- Eran Nave
- Ronit Porat
- Tal R
- Moshe Roas
- Ugo Rondinone
- Yehudit Sasportas
- Nadine Schemmann
- Lihi Turjeman
- Sharon Yaari
- Rona Yefman
- Thomas Zipp

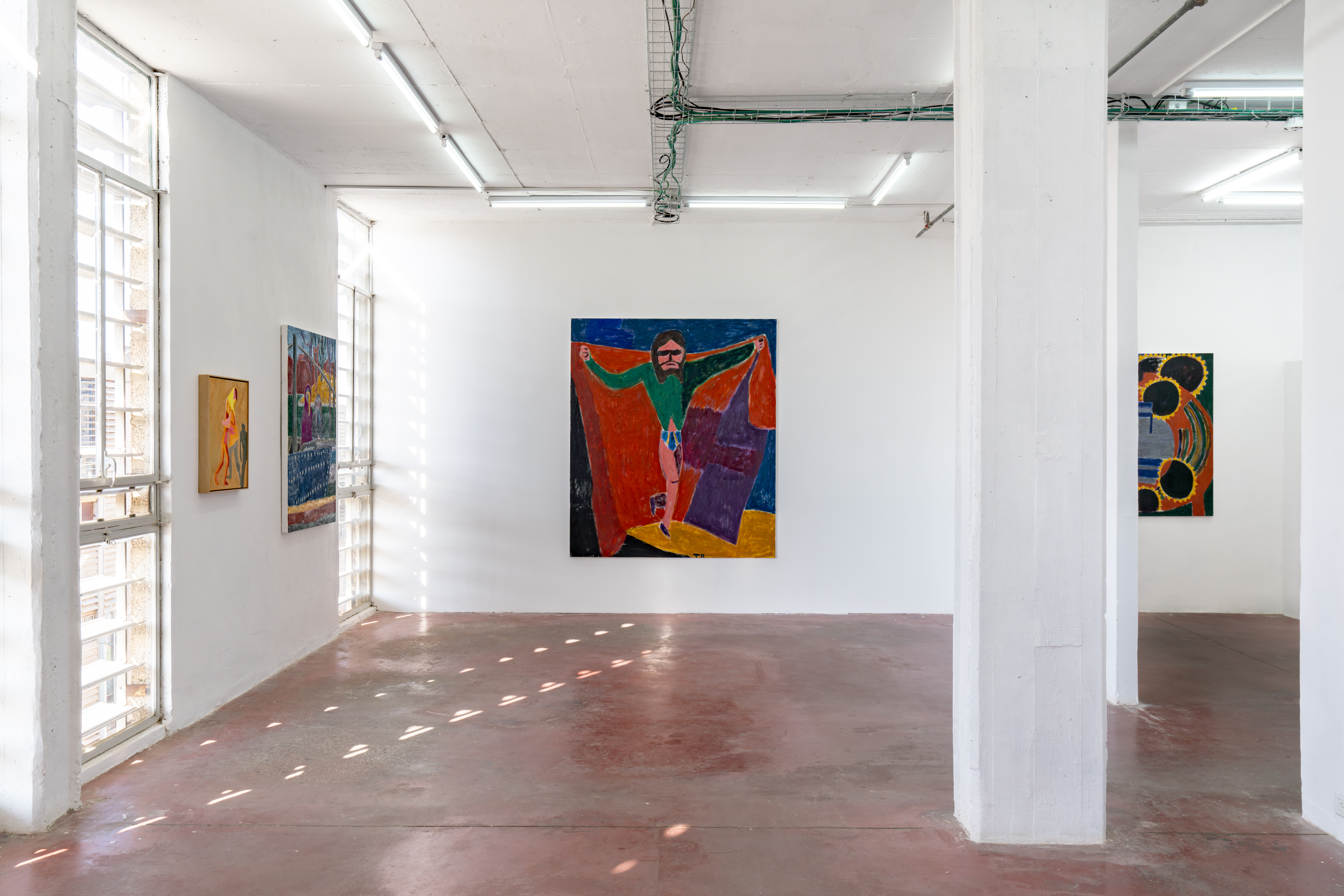
Sommer Contemporary Art, Installation view

== See also ==
- Art in Tel Aviv
