= Catherine Elwes =

British artist, curator and critic

- Born: 1952 (age 73–74); St Maixent
- Education: Slade School of Fine Art; Royal College of Art
- Notable work: Menstruation II
- Style: Video art

Catherine Elwes (born 1952) is a British artist, curator and critic working predominantly in the field of video art and a significant figure in the British feminist art movement.

== Early life ==
She was born in St Maixent, France. She studied at the Slade School of Fine Art and later graduated with an MA in Environmental Media from the Royal College of Art.

== Career ==
Elwes began working with video in the late 1970s. In 1979 she performed Menstruation II, a three-day performance at the Slade which lasted for the duration of a menstrual period.

She co-curated the exhibitions Women’s Images of Men (with Jacqueline Morreau) and About Time (with Rose Garrard and Sandy Nairne) at the ICA in 1980. She was the director of the biennial UK/Canadian Film & Video Exchange (1998-2006) at the South London Gallery and co-curator of Figuring Landscapes (2008-2010), an international screening exhibition on themes of landscape. Elwes has written extensively about feminist art, performance, installation, landscape and the moving image and is author of Video Loupe (K.T. Press, 2000), Video Art, a guided tour (I.B. Tauris, 2005), Installation and the Moving Image (Wallflower/Columbia University Press, 2015) and Landscape and the Moving Image (Intellect Books, 2022). Elwes is Founding Editor of the Moving Image Review & Art Journal (MIRAJ, Intellect Books) and has contributed to numerous anthologies, journals, exhibition catalogues and periodicals including Art Monthly, Third Text, MIRAJ, the Millennium Film Journal, Time Out, Independent Media, Performance Magazine, Variant, Filmwaves (of which she was an editor), Vertigo and Contemporary Magazine.

Elwes’ video practice is archived at LUX online and REWIND.

Elwes taught art for many years and was director of the early Digital Editing Research Programme at Camberwell College of Art in London. She retired as Professor of Moving Image Art from Chelsea College of Art in 2017.

She now lives in Oxford.

== Notable artworks ==
- Menstruation II (1979), Slade College of Art
- Kensington Gore (1982)
- The critic's informed viewing (1982)
- First House (1986)
- Post-card (1986)

== See also ==
- Video art
- Feminist art
- Laura Mulvey
- Jacqueline Morreau
