= Grubinger =

Grubinger is a surname. Notable people with the surname include:

- Eva Grubinger (born 1970), Austrian artist
- Martin Grubinger (born 1983), Austrian drummer
