= Marc Latamie =

Marc Latamie (born 1952) is a Martinican artist.

He graduated in Art history and Visual Art at the University of Paris VIII in 1978. A Laureate of the Villa Medicis Hors-les-Murs in 1986, an important Award offered by the French Government, Latamie selected New York City to develop his career.

== Career ==
Latamie’s artistic works mainly refers to History, to Art History and also the complexity of Human kind History. On some occasions he will consider the issues of globalization, how, for example, the World Trade has affected the populations in transit.

In 2012, in his most recent exhibition at the Americas Society in New York, Latamie displayed a reenactment of the turn of the 19th century, where the devastating use of Absinth became a substitute for artists and poets just before WW1. Latamie grew up in Martinique where absinth was considered a natural beverage that never fell under the regime of French Prohibition

Since moving to New York in 1987, Marc Latamie has selectively participated in some museums and biennales exhibitions around the globe. From the 23rd São Paulo Biennale, or El Centro de Arte Moderno in Las Palmas in 1994, to the MoMA-Queens “Tempo” exhibition in 2002, he has always refused to be involved in the general field of galleries exhibitions.

His latest work is part of the Caribbean Crossroads of the World at the PAMM (Perez Art Museum Miami).

Over the last 25 years, several editors have also featured Latamie’s artwork in contemporary art, as in “Contemporary Art and Ideas in an Era of Globalisation” edited by Gilane Tawadros, or in Gert Oostindie's book, “Facing Up to the Past: Perspectives on the Commemoration of Slavery from Africa, the Americas and Europe.”

In his earlier years in Paris, Marc Latamie has been part of the first team of Lecturers at the National Museum of Art - Centre Pompidou (Paris), and for l’Ecole du Louvre (Paris). Since 1998, Latamie has been a visiting professor at Cooper Union in NY, invited by Hans Haacke, and for several years a visiting scholar at New York University. Latamie would on occasions participate in lecturers at Columbia University, U-Mass Boston, and several Art Schools across Europe and the Caribbean.

=== Exhibitions (selection) ===
- Caribbean: Crossroads of the World, curated by Elvis Fuentes and Diana Nawi, Mane, Thecel, Phares II, Perez Art Museum Miami, Floride, Avril 2014
- The Absinthe Flavor, “For Rent”, Americas Society, New York, 2012
- Legacies: Contemporary Artists on Slavery, NY Historical Society, 2006
- Island Thresholds, The Peabody Essex Museum, 2005 – Ajoupa and Casatlantic
- Busan Biennale, South Korea, 2002 – The Communion – Cacao Project
- Espacio C, Camargo, Spain, 2002 – Coffee Project
- Tempo, MoMA-Queens, 2002 – Casabagass, the Sugar Cane Juice Bar
- Spoleto-USA, Charleston, SC, 2002 – Débit de la Regie
- Natura, Utopia i Realidades, Osorio, Gran Canaria, 2001
- Eventa, Uppsala, Sweden, 2000 – Atlantic –Atlantic & a Monument for Descartes
- Dakar Biennale, Senegal, 2000 – Commerce and St Maurice in penitence.
- Diaspora, Oviedo, Spain, 1999 –
- Caribe Insular, Casa de America, Madrid, Spain, 1998
- Caribe Insular, Contemporary Art Museum de Badajoz, Spain, 1998
- Islas, Centro de Arte Contemporaneo, Sevilla, Spain, 1998
- Transatlantico, Centro de Arte Moderno, Las Palmas de Gran Canaria, 1998
- Islas, Centro de Arte Moderno de Las Palmas de Gran Canaria, 1997
- Johannesburg Biennale, RSA, 1997 – The Office of the Cotton Merchant
- Havana Biennale, Cuba, 1997 – Poèmes Crystallin
- São Paulo Biennale, Brazil, 1996 – Mane, Thecel, Phares : 2 Tons of raffined Sugar
- Kunsthalle Krems, Austria, 1996 – Saint Mauricius etc.
- Bonnington Gallery, Nottingham, UK, 1996
- Institute of Contemporary Art London, UK, 1995– Mirage
- Palau de la Virreina, Barcelona, Spain, 1995 – Otro Pais - Alize, Castor & Pollux
- Fundacion La Caixa, Palma de Mallorca, Otro Pais -1995 –
- Centro de arte Moderno de Las Palmas de Gran Canaria, Otro Pais - 1994
- Nexus Art Center, Atlanta, 1994
- Saline Royale de Arc et Senans, France, 1994

=== Texts (selection) ===
- Bound to appear : Art, Slavery, and the Site of Blackness in Multicultural America, edited by Huey Copeland, 2013
- Politics of Memory : Making Slavery Visible in the Public Space, edited by Ana Lucia Araujo, 2012
- Breaking down the Barriers : Art in the 1990s, edited by Richard Cork, 2003
- Cultural Encounters in the New World, edited by Harald Zapf, 2003
- Trading Across the Black Atlantic : Globalization and the Work of Marc Latamie, by Veerle Poupeye, 2002, Australian and New Zealand Journal of Art
- Facing Up to the Past: Perspectives on the Commemoration of Slavery from Africa, the Americas and Europe, edited by Gert Oostindie and James Currey, 2002.
- The fact of blackness : Frantz Fanon and visual représentation, Institute of Contemporary Arts, 1996
- L’artôt: Ernest Breleur, Jean Clareboudt, Marc Latamie, Fonds Régional d'Art Contemporain de Martinique, Frac Martinique, 1992
- Marc Latamie, Comme si la peinture avait perdu la mémoire !, Claire Stoullig, Edition Ek’ymose art contemporain, Bordeaux, France, 1987.

=== Public Collections ===
- Fond Régional d’Art, Paris (1978–1981)
- FRAC Champagne Ardenne
- FRAC Franche-Comté
- Musée National d’Art Moderne (Centre Pompidou)
- FRAC Martinique
- Centro Atlantico de Arte Moderno (CAAM) Las Palmas de Gran Canaria
- EOLE, ELOE - Monumental Sculpture in Las Palmas Botanical Garden
