= Meleko Mokgosi =

Botswanan-American painter

- Born: 1981 (age 44–45); Francistown, Botswana
- Education: Williams College; University of California, Los Angeles
- Occupation: Artist • assistant professor
- Employer: Yale University
- Known for: Painting
- Website: melekomokgosi.com

Meleko Mokgosi (born 1981) is an artist and associate professor of painting and drawing at the School of Art at Yale University. His work includes large-scale paintings that explore themes of colonialism, democracy, nationalism, and life in Southern Africa.

== Early life and education ==
Mokgosi was born in 1981 in Francistown, Botswana, and raised by his mother and grandmother in the city of Maun. He began drawing in primary school. While in high school, he became interested in the potential of making political commentary with art. In 2003, he moved to the United States, participated in the Whitney Independent Study Program, and studied art at Williams College and University of California, Los Angeles (UCLA), earning B.A. in 2007, and Master of Fine Arts in 2011. Mokgosi studied for four years with American conceptual artist Mary Kelly, who guided him in developing a project-based practice, which he described as "focused not on producing objects but articulating a set of questions".

== Career ==
From 2008–2011 Mokgosi created his first series of paintings, Pax Afrikaner, which explored xenophobia and national identity in southern Africa.

In 2012, Mokgosi was an artist-in-residence at the Studio Museum in Harlem. There he worked on completing his Pax Kaffraria painting series, which he explained was "to explore how people in southern Africa think about nationhood." Mokgosi made a series of more than 50 paintings on the subject of colonialism in Africa. A book on the Pax Kaffraria project was published by the Hammer Museum in 2014.

In 2014, Mokgosi began the eight-chapter project Democratic Intuition, which he described as being about "how do normal people understand, reciprocate, have access to, and not have access to the ideas of democracy and the democratic". He presented the first two chapters of this work at his first solo New York exhibition in 2016.

Mokgosi's work Terra pericolosa III (Dangerous Land III) from 2015, is featured in the collection of the Pérez Art Museum Miami, Florida.

Meleko Mokgosi also co-founded (with Avram Alpert and Anthea Behm) The Interdisciplinary Art and Theory Program in New York in 2018: an exclusive education programme for fine arts practitioners aimed at facilitating the investigation of various knowledge frameworks in the world of the arts.

In 2019, his solo show Meleko Mokgosi: Your Trip to Africa at the Pérez Art Museum Miami, Florida, showcased a new large-scale commission created for PAMM's double-high project gallery. Through Mokgosi's detailed figurative and often hyperrealist paintings, the show extended the artist's investigations on the postcolonial condition, national identity, and life in southern Africa.

In 2024, Mokgosi is being featured in Prospect. 6: The Future Is Present, The Harbinger Is Home, in New Orleans. His work was on view at the Contemporary Arts Center.

=== Academic career ===
Meleko Mokgosi was an assistant professor of Practice at the Gallatin School of Individualized Study at New York University between 2012 and 2019. In 2019, Mokgosi began his work as an associate professor in the Yale School of Art at Yale University, New Haven. He was then promoted twice to Co-Director then Director of Graduate Studies of Painting/Printmaking.

== Style ==
There are two distinct approaches in Meleko Mokgosi’s paintings.

In projects such as 'Wall of Casbah' (2009–2014), and 'Modern Art: The Root of African Savages' (2012–2016) he takes a text-based approach. This involves reproducing museum labels on canvas with annotations to highlight the inherent cultural bias and colonial power dynamics in these supposedly neutral educational materials.

Other projects like Pax Afrikaner and Pax Kaffraria are figurative and draw from visual sources such as European history painting and cinematic imagery. These works combine a range of imagery, tropes and symbols, to bring a critical eye to aspects of national identity, colonial history and post-colonial legacies within Southern Africa. Mokgosi frequently incorporates Setswana text in his paintings—an approach, he discusses in Ocula Magazine, that 'creates the conditions of de-centring viewers who do not know the language, and therefore points to the asymmetrical nature of globalisation, which always tilts in favour of the Western viewer.'

== Honors and awards ==
- 2012 – Inaugural Mohn Award, Hammer Museum
- 2017 – Vilcek Prize for Creative Promise in Fine Arts
