= Marisa Rueda =

Argentinian-born sculptor and ceramicist (1941–2022)

- Born: 1941; Buenos Aires, Argentina
- Died: 2022 (aged 80–81); London, England
- Movement: Sculpture
- Website: marisarueda.com

Marisa Rueda (1941–2022) was an Argentina-born artist. She is known for her sculpture and ceramics.

Rueda was born in 1941 in Buenos Aires, Argentina. She attended the Escuela Nacional de Bellas Artes Prilidiano Pueyrredón. She emigrated to England soon after the 1976 Argentine coup d'état Her work was included in the 1981 exhibition Women’s Images of Men at the Institute of Contemporary Arts in London. In 1989 she completed the sculpture The Man Who Blows the Clouds which was installed on Shepherd's Bush Green.

For a time she was married to Barry Chaplin with whom she had one child. She died in London in 2022 at the age of 80.

She was a member of the Association for Cultural Advancement through Visual Art (ACAVA) and through that organization participated in the Tate Modern workshop Age/ncy: Art, Ageing and Transition with Flourishing Lives. She was a member of the Royal Society of Sculptors. Her work is in the collection of the Essex Collection of Art from Latin America (ESCALA).
