= Gregor Hildebrandt =

German artist (born 1974)

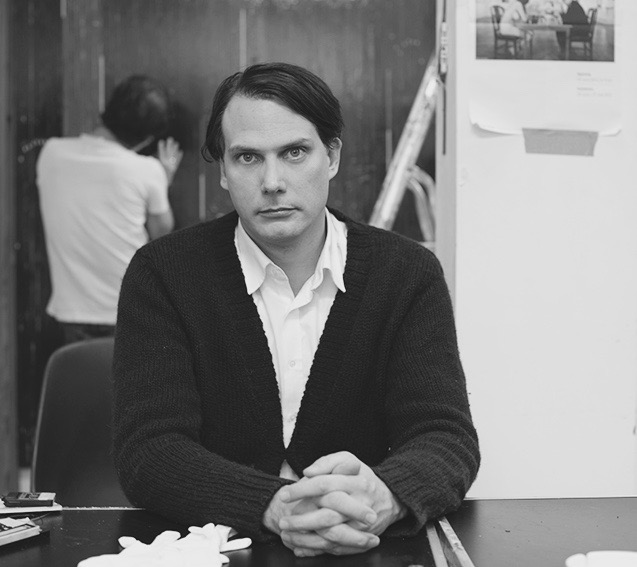

Gregor Hildebrandt (born 1974) is a German contemporary artist who lives and works in Berlin, Germany.

== Early life and education ==
Hildebrandt was born in Bad Homburg, West Germany. He studied at the University of Mainz between 1995 and 1999. He was awarded a Studienstiftung scholarship between 1998 and 2002 and received a scholarship at the Deutsches Studienzentrum in Venice the following year, while still a student. He graduated from Berlin University of the Arts in 2002.

== Work ==
In his artistic practice, Hildebrandt makes extensive use of pre-recorded cassette tapes as material in his pictures and installations. The tapes are applied directly onto canvases and photographic prints and in room-sized installations. In his paintings, he adheres the coated side of cassette tapes onto a canvas, presses on it with a brush or roller, and rips the tape off to create the defined, yet sporadic lines on his works. He repeats the process before finally gluing them onto the canvas for good to create what he calls the "negative” painting. For sculptures, he shapes vinyl records into bowls, sometimes stacking them to create what the artist calls a "sonic wall made of pillars of records.”

Hildebrandt started thinking about incorporating audio into his practice during his time at the University of the Arts in Berlin. In the late 1990s, the artist recorded 'Falschgeld' by German experimental group Einstürzende Neubauten before cutting the magnetic tape out and pasting it into his sketchbook. Hildebrandt's signature canvases known for its magnetic tape covering were developed in the 2000s, gradually increasing in size to take on architectural dimensions. The 2021 large-scale installation Hirnholzparkett (2015), shown at G2 Kunsthalle in Leipzig, incorporated 35,000 audiocassette tapes into record-sized reels, cast into epoxy resin and layered across the floor.

Although Hildebrandt's work makes formal reference to Minimalism, the addition of a great number of subjective and autobiographical citations actually deliberately repudiates this strategy. For Hildebrandt, the cassette tape as artistic medium, especially in its original function of storage medium, fulfils an important function: it enables the artist to add a further "invisible” dimension to his pictures. Playing with perception in this way is a major characteristic of his work; the picture is completed in the head of the viewer.

If the contemplation of his art incorporates the heterogeneous cosmos of Gregor Hildebrandt's references to music, film, literature and, last but not least, art history, his works turn out to be complex montages, in which pictorial associations from different spheres combine and interpenetrate. Hildebrandt employs the material of his every-day environment without aesthetic or theoretical inhibition and playfully links aspects of conceptual art and minimal art with his personal life and experience of pop culture.

== Selected solo exhibitions ==
2023

- For The White City, Sommer Contemporary Art, Tel Aviv
- Milky Milky Milky, Sommer Salon, Zurich

2017

- The Black Concern For The Sail, Sommer Contemporary Art, Tel Aviv

2013

- Du Stehst Im Licht, Du Stehst Im Schatten (You Stand In The Light, You Stand In The Shade), Sommer Contemporary Art, Tel Aviv

2012

- Nächtliches Konzert, Museum Van Bommel van Dam with Jorinde Voigt, Venlo, Netherlands
- Eind Koffer aus Berlin, Saarländisches Künstlerhaus, Saarbrücken
- Schlaf is Zeit, die dir gehört], AVLSKARL, Copenhagen

2011

- FÜR KOMMENDE MORGEN, Wentrup, Berlin
- Seiten im Buch wie Wände im Raum, Almine Rech Gallery, Paris
- Und dass zu frühe die Parze den Traum nicht ende, Grimm Gallery, Amsterdam

2010

- Shapeless in the Dark again, Sommer Contemporary Art, Tel Aviv
- vor der Tür stehen weiße Pferde, Galerie Almine Rech, Brussels
- die Nacht trägt den Plan, Van Horn, Düsseldorf

2009

- Weiße Nacht hängt an den Bergen, GriederContemporary, Zurich
- Daß dieser Mai nie ende, Wentrup, Berlin
- Der Himmel im Raum, Berlinische Galerie, Berlin (cat.)

2008

- This was made to end all parties, Ursula Werz, Tübingen
- Front Room, Contemporary Art Museum St. Louis, St. Louis
- Hokuspokus, Kunstverein Schwerte, Schwerte
- Statement, Art 39 Basel (with Galerie Jan Wentrup)
- und im Garten blüht ein Blumenbeet, Haus am Waldsee, Berlin

2007

- Dunkle Fahrt zu hellem Tag, Kunstverein Ludwigshafen
- Dunkle Fahrt zu hellem Tag, Galerie Jan Wentrup, Berlin
- Zum Wohl der Tränen, Almine Rech Gallery, Paris

2006

- B:1F-134, Uberbau, Düsseldorf with Alicja Kwade

2005

- Von den Steinen zu den Sternen, Galerie Jan Wentrup, Berlin
- Tage und Stunden zerspringen vor Glück, Städtische Galerie Pankow, Berlin

2004

- allnightlong, Kaiserpassage 21a, Karlsruhe (with Jenny Rosemeyer)
- Und dieses Wasser wird sich immer schwarz färben, Arsenal HKM1, Raum für Kunst, Mainz

2003

- Dunst blauer Tage, Kunstverein Eislingen (cat.)
- Hausmusik, Mt. Warning, Berlin
- Black Flags under the Yellow Moon, Hinterconti, Hamburg (with Carola Deye)

2002

- Tönende Jugend, WBD, Berlin

== Public collections ==
- Centre Pompidou, Paris
- Berlinische Galerie, Berlin
- Bundeskunstsammlung, Federal Republic of Germany
- Museum van Bommel van Dam, Venlo, Netherlands

== Awards and scholarships ==
- 2008 – Vattenfall Kunstpreis "Energie"]
- 2008 – Stiftung Kunstfonds
- 2005 / 2006 – Scholarship, DAAD, Vienna
- 2004 – Award, GASAG
- 2003 – Scholarship, Deutsches Studienzentrum Venedig
- 1998 / 2002 – Scholarship, Studienstiftung des deutschen Volkes

== Curating ==
Since 2017, Hildebrandt has been operating Grzegorzki Shows, an exhibition space at his studio.

In 2021, Hildebradt was the first guest curator for TheArtists, an online sales platform for unrepresented artists; he picked from his own students at the Academy of Fine Arts, Munich.

== Art market ==
Hildebrandt is represented by Wentrup in Berlin, Grimm Gallery in Amsterdam, Almine Rech Gallery in Paris, Brussels and London and Emmanuel Perrotin in New York. and Casado Santapau gallery at Madrid.

== Personal life ==
Since 2000, Hildebrandt has been in a relationship with fellow artist Alicja Kwade. Their son Horatio was born in 2020.

== Bibliography ==
- Gregor Hildebrandt: Tönend hallt die Jugend, Kunsthalle Recklinghausen, DE/EN, ISBN 978-3-947804-02-3
