= Mary Kelly (artist) =

American conceptual artist (born 1941)

- Born: 1941 (age 84–85); Fort Dodge, Iowa
- Education: St. Martin's School of Art
- Known for: Visual Art, Feminist Studies
- Notable work: Post-Partum Document (1973-79), Love Songs (2005-07), Peace is the Only Shelter (2019)
- Movement: Conceptual art
- Awards: Guggenheim Fellowship (2015)
- Website: marykellyartist.com

Mary Kelly (born 1941, Fort Dodge, Iowa) is an American conceptual artist, feminist, educator, and writer.

Kelly has contributed extensively to the discourse of feminism and postmodernism through her large-scale narrative installations and theoretical writings. Kelly's work mediates between conceptual art and the more intimate interests of artists of the 1980s. Her work has been exhibited internationally and she is considered among the most influential contemporary artists working today.

Kelly is Judge Widney Professor at the USC Roski School of Art and Design of the University of Southern California. She was previously Professor of Art at the University of California, Los Angeles, where she was Head of Interdisciplinary Studio, an area she initiated for artists engaged in site-specific, collective, and project-based work. She was interviewed about her experience teaching at UCLA in Sarah Thornton's Seven Days in the Art World.

As a professor, Kelly has mentored artists, writers, and curators including Kerry Tribe, Meleko Mokgosi, Helen Molesworth, Wu Tsang, Amadour, George Baker, Karl Haendel, Renée Green, Sharon Hayes, Emily Jacir, Miwon Kwon, and Mungo Thomson.

== Work ==
Mary Kelly is known for her project-based work in the form of large-scale narrative installations. Her projects constructed in the 1970s are preoccupied with her experiences of pregnancy and child raising. Antepartum (1973), a single shot of the artist stroking her abdomen as her unborn baby moves, and Post-Partum Document (1973–79), a six part project using both personal and theoretical elements to document the mother-child relationship, were created in the same year.

First shown at the ICA in London 1976, Post-Partum Document was made up of six sections and 135 smaller units — accompanied by a number of essays and footnotes — consisting of different objects from Kelly's newborn son's life. The work tracks in detail everything that her son did, from eating to expelling, and maintains a diary of the artist's thoughts. Post-Partum Document collected used liners from the inside of his cloth diapers, feeding charts, and speech events documented by Kelly. Each documentation is made out of distinct and carefully thought-out materials. Documentation I, for example, incorporated six used liners from Kelly's son's cloth diapers paired with her written text. This unusual subject matter caused outrage and controversy at the debut exhibition because some viewers believed that displaying excrement on used diapers at an art gallery was not appropriate. Documentation III is a transcription of conversations with her child, her internal speech as a mother, and locating the conversation within a specific time interval. Her child's drawing on top of the careful, meticulous documentation emphasizes the interactive nature of the series and the fact that the relationship between a child and their mother can be "difficult and complex" instead of solely sentimental. In this series, Kelly adapts over time as a mother along with her child. Documentation VI is a Rosetta Stone-like tablet with text recording the process of Kelly's son learning to write and other milestone life events that were seemingly mundane, but important to the development of the relationship between Kelly and her son. According to art historian Lucy Lippard, Post-Partum Document "outlines social interference into the 'ideal' relationship of mother and child (or artist and object) in terms of desire, presence and absence."

For Lippard, and other art historians, this project must be considered within a feminist discourse of consciousness-raising, collaborative work, and discussions about sexual division of labor. Kelly created this work during the second-wave of feminism that focused on ways women worked in the home. Post-Partum Document is a notable work of feminist art because it is a relevant depiction of the meaning of motherhood for contemporary women. Additionally, Post-Partum Document deploys a distanced and seemingly objective look at being a mother and discusses the creation of subjectivity, something many of the male artists during Kelly's time avoided.

Throughout the 1980s and into the present day, Kelly's projects continue to engage with questions posed by theoretical practice and subjectivity. In her monumental work, Interim (1984–89), Kelly deals with collective memories of women. Its object is to specify the discourses that define and regulate feminine identities. Despite the absence of female bodies in this project, Emily Apter writes that clothing in Interim, as well as Kelly's other projects, shows that "representation and exemplarity are guaranteed by the jackets in bondage." Another project Gloria Patri (1992), draws on an archive of found material from the first Gulf War to question how the violence of international events affects or is affected by individual lives. In the Ballad of Kastriot Rexhepi (2001), panels of lint, formed in a domestic dryer, are joined to form undulating waves that tell the story of a child abandoned during the war in Kosovo. Art historian Griselda Pollock wrote that this "pattern of repeat and inversion evokes both a visual register of sound waves and images of pulse and flow as well as recalling the structure of biological life, the helix." Ultimately, Pollock situates this project as an intersection between the material as both virtual and indexical. The Ballad of Kastriot Rechepi then "evokes the photographic visual effect while yet bearing no image, and staging no sight again performs a constant Kelly move: to stage in a created art work a commentary on the modes of seeing and knowledge typical of our cultures and media, one face of our creation through the interface with these signifying systems as social subjects." As part of this work, Kelly commissioned the composer, Michael Nyman to create a score for the ballad that was performed by soprano Sarah Leonard and the Nyman Quartet at the opening of the exhibition at the Santa Monica Museum of Art.

In 2004, Kelly created a piece called Circa 1968. This set of works brings back the movement of the 1968 demonstration by university students in Paris. Similar to the Ballad of Kastriot Rexhepi, the piece is composed of dryer lint and required over 10,000 loads of laundry to acquire enough lint to produce. The installation is projected onto the wall to bring about questions of the reoccurring past, the future and the legacy that these events will hold. For Love Songs (2005), Kelly enlisted the help of young women interested in the philosophies and legacies of the women's movement to restage historical photographs of protests some thirty years after they were taken. Her “remixes” are just approximate enough to allow for real differences between versions, but similar enough to suggest literal and metaphorical continuities.

== Selected exhibitions ==
Kelly has had major solo exhibitions at the New Museum of Contemporary Art, New York, in 1990, Generali Foundation, Vienna, in 1998, Institute for Contemporary Art, London, in 1993. Recent group exhibitions she had include documenta 12, Kassel, Germany, in 2007, WACK! Art and the Feminist Revolution, Museum of Contemporary Art, Los Angeles, in 2007, the 2004 Whitney Biennial at the Whitney Museum of American Art, New York, the 2008 Biennale of Sydney, Australia, the 2008 California Biennial, in Mary Kelly: Projects, 1973-2020 at the Whitworth Gallery in Manchester, UK, in 2011, and, most recently, in the 2024 Whitney Biennial at the Whitney Museum of American Art, New York.

The first three parts of her influential work Post-Partum Document (1973 - 7) were shown at the Institute of Contemporary Arts in 1976. Interim, one of her most ambitious projects, was first shown as a complete work at the New Museum in 1990. In 2007 she participated in documenta in Kassel, Germany, exhibiting a mixed media installation entitled "Love Songs". Kelly's works are held in numerous museum collections including the Tate. She also participated in the first edition of Desert X in Palm Springs, California.

== Selected publications ==
=== By the artist ===
- Post-Partum Document, Routledge & Kegan Paul, 1983, reprint, English and German, Generali Foundation, Vienna and University of California Press, Berkeley, 1998
- Imaging Desire, MIT Press, 1996
- Pecunia Olet, Top Stories, New York 1989
- Mary Kelly's Concentric Pedagogy: Selected Writings, Bloomsbury Visual Arts, London 2024

=== On the artist ===
- Rance, Victoria 'Mary Kelly: Projects, 1973-2010' n.paradoxa Volume 28 July 2011 pp. 80–87.
- Mary Kelly: Words are things, (catalog) and Mary Kelly: On fidelity, (conference papers), Centre for Contemporary Art, Ujazdowski Castle, Warsaw, 2008
- Mary Kelly, Espacio AV, Region de Murcia, 2008
- Mary Kelly: La balada de Kastriot Rexhepi/ Musica original de Michael Nyman, (catalog), Universidad Nacional Autonoma de Mexico, 2004
- Rereading Post-Partum Document, Generali Foundation, Vienna, 1999
- Mary Kelly, Phaidon Press, London, 1997
- Social Process Collaborative Action: Mary Kelly 1970-1975, Charles H. Scott Gallery, Vancouver, 1997
- Mary Kelly: Gloria Patri, (catalog) Herbert F. Johnson Museum, Cornell University and Ezra & Cecile Zilkha Gallery, Wesleyan University
- Mary Kelly: Interim, (catalog), New Museum of Contemporary Art, New York, 1990.
- Richmond, Susan. "From Stone to Cloud: Mary Kelly's Love Songs and Feminist Intergenerationality". Feminist Theory 11.1 (2010): 57-78. Print.

== Public collections ==
- Arts Council of Great Britain
- Art Gallery of Ontario, Canada
- Australian National Gallery
- Burger Collection, Zurich, Switzerland
- Centre for Contemporary Art, Ujazdowski Castle, Warsaw, Poland
- Centre Pompidou Foundation, Paris, France
- Cleveland Museum of Art, Cleveland, OH
- Colorado University Art Museum, Boulder, CO
- Generali Foundation, Vienna, Austria
- Hammer Museum, UCLA, Los Angeles, CA
- Helsinki City Art Museum, Finland
- Hessel Museum of Art, Bard College, NY
- Kunsthaus Zurich, Switzerland
- Mackenzie Art Gallery, Regina, Canada
- Moderna Musset, Stockholm, Sweden
- Museum of Contemporary Art, Chicago, IL
- Museum of Contemporary Art, Los Angeles, CA
- Museum of Modern Art, New York City, NY
- Museum of New Zealand Te Papa Tongarewa
- Museum Sztuki, Łódź, Poland
- National Gallery of Art, Washington D.C.
- New Hall, Cambridge University, Cambridge, UK
- New Museum of Contemporary Art, New York, NY
- Norton Family Foundation, Santa Monica, CA
- Orange County Museum of Art, Newport Beach, CA
- Progressive Corporation
- Rachofsky House, Dallas, TX
- Spencer Museum of Art, Lawrence, KS
- Tate Britain, London, UK
- Tate Modern, London, UK
- Vancouver Art Gallery, British Columbia, Canada
- Victoria and Albert Museum, London, UK
- Weil, Gotshal and Manges Collection
- Whitney Museum of American Art, New York, NY
- The Whitworth Art Gallery, Manchester, UK
- Zabludowicz Collection, London, UK

== See also ==
- Feminist art movement in the United States
