= Karl Haendel =

American artist

Karl Haendel (born 1976, New York City) is an American artist who lives and works in Los Angeles, California. Haendel is currently represented by Vielmetter Los Angeles, Wentrup Gallery, Berlin, and Sommer Contemporary Art, Zurich/Tel Aviv, and formerly worked with Mitchell-Innes & Nash, New York, and Yvon Lambert Gallery, Paris.

== Education ==
Haendel received a bachelor's degree in Art Semiotics and Art History from Brown University in 1998. He attended the Whitney Museum Independent Study Program and the Skowhegan School of Painting and Sculpture in 1999 and 2000 respectively. He received a Master of Fine Arts degree from the University of California Los Angeles in 2003 where he studied with John Baldessari, Mary Kelly, Charles Ray, and Paul McCarthy.

== Work ==
Haendel's work comprises drawing, installation, film, and public projects. He is best known for his large scale graphite drawings on paper.

His work examines "masculinity, intimacy, friendship, fatherhood, and loss. With a blend of technical precision and dry, self-aware humor, Haendel invites viewers to slow down and reflect on the contradictions of contemporary life. Working primarily in graphite on paper, Haendel embraces analogue mark-making as both method and metaphor. His text-based drawings pair confessional, first-person reflections with the labor of drawing, surfacing relatable experiences of love, insecurity, grief, and Jewish identity...[his] works, explore vulnerability and emotional honesty as essential counterpoints to stereotypical expectations of masculinity."

Haendel's practice focuses on recontextualization of visual signifiers through a personal and idiosyncratic language of drawing, comprising photorealism, cartoons, jokes and written texts. His drawings, based on sources both found and self-authored, are also composed at a markedly larger scale; transforming the quickness of composing a photograph with the manual labor required to produce drawings that often exceed 14 feet. Installing drawings in complex rooms sized installations, Haendel presents a new visual language and criticism on contemporary sociocultural relationships. Haendel "focuses on how a chain of iteration...re-makes images into new representations,” to “engage the long process of language building.”

Haendel describes his role as an artist to “honestly present a vision of the world that he…believes to be true.” For Haendel, this conviction is the ethical underpinning of his practice.

== Exhibitions ==
Haendel has been included in exhibitions at the Museum of Modern Art, NY; the New Museum, NY; and the Guggenheim Museum, NY. His works are included in the public collections of the Museum of Contemporary Art, Los Angeles, LA; The Museum of Modern Art, New York, NY; and the Guggenheim Museum, New York, NY.

Two years after graduating from UCLA, Haendel had a solo exhibition at the Museum of Contemporary Art, Los Angeles in 2005. David Pagel described Haendel's work in this exhibition as that of a “detached observer, an armchair sociologist more interested in pointing out the irrationality of society's crass values than in risking failure to shake things up.” In a later review of the show, Jody Zellen described Haendel as a “smart artist.” “He has the skills as well as the know how to make intelligent, beautiful, and well-designed works of art...He appropriates the strategies of appropriation and installation, while also acknowledging conceptualism, minimalism, and the power of political art.”

In 2011 Haendel exhibited his first film, “Questions for my father,” made in collaboration with filmmaker Petter Ringbom. The film “evolved from a series of large graphite word-drawings of the same title that Mr. Haendel...directed at his own father.” The film features 16 men in their 30s and early 40s, including the artist and filmmaker. “Each man makes repeat appearances, looking directly into the camera and asking a short, pithy question that, it doesn’t take long to realize, are intended for the speaker’s absent male parent. The questions imply a full-spectrum of emotions, from tenderness to curiosity to anger, and speak volumes about one of the most primal of relationships.” The film was shown in 2012 The Box Theater at the Wexner Center for the Arts and the Utah Museum of Contemporary Art.

In 2013, Haendel produced a new installation, “People Who Don’t Know They’re Dead,” for the 12th Biennale de Lyon, Lyon, France, curated by Gunnar B. Kvaran. The installation is made up of approximately 60 drawings which focus on themes of gun violence, sexual difference, technological fetishism, and power structures.

Haendel was also included in the 2004 and 2008 California Biennials at the Orange County Museum of Art, Prospect New Orleans, in 2011, the 12th Biennale de Lyon in 2013, the 2014 Whitney Biennial, Whitney Museum of American Art, New York; and the 2015 Biennial of the Americas, Museum of Contemporary Art, Denver.

Haendel has been included in numerous exhibitions on contemporary drawing at the Drawing Room, London, UK and Modern Art Oxford, Oxford, UK, both in 2018.

== Public Projects ==
Haendel has created numerous public art projects throughout his career.

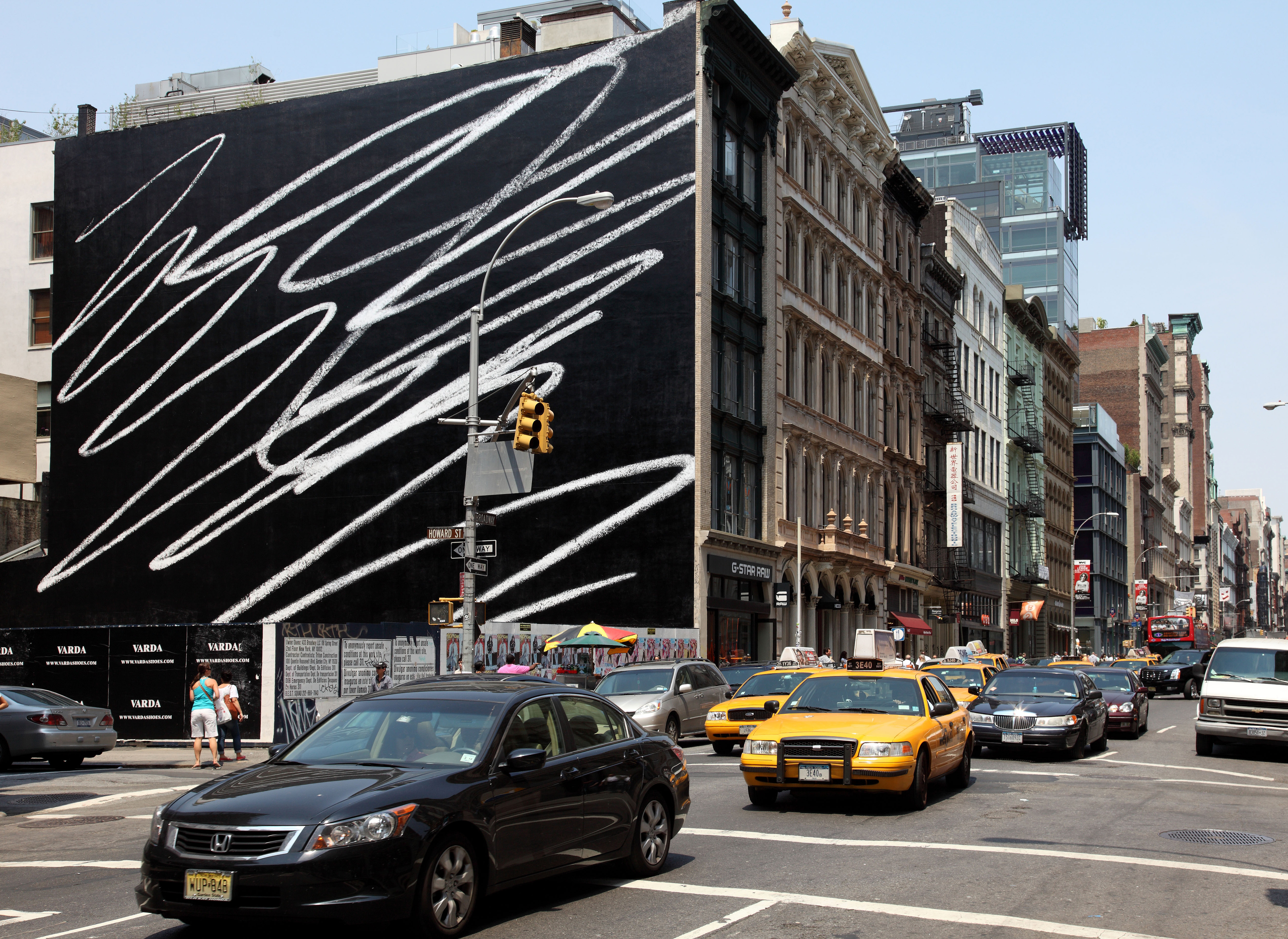
Public Scribble #1, 2009, enamel on wall, 80x120 feet, installated at 441 Broadway, Soho, New York, courtesy Art Production Fund, New York

In 2009, he created Public Scribble #1 with the Art Production Fund, where he tasked trained sign painters, known as walldogs, to enlarge a small pencil doodle by hand to five stories on the side of building on lower Broadway in Manhattan. "This handmade feeling is crucial to the artwork", Haendel told The New York Times in 2009,"It’s goofy and humorous...But this kind of mark making is a simple gesture people can relate to on a basic level." In 2010 he presented another hand-painted enlarged scribble, this time on the facade of LAXART (now The Brick), in Los Angeles.

In 2010, Haendel was commissioned to design an installation for the lobby of the Lever House. The installation featured his “signature, stunning graphite drawings on paper--one series depicting cracked light bulbs, mirrors, and eggs; another, the fortunes from fortune cookies; another, abstractions that riff on Mondrian’s “Boogie-Woogie” series—all of which covered two 20-foot-long walls that cross the building's famed glass lobby.”

In 2026, Haendel will inaugurate a work at the entry of the Wilshire/Fairfax station for Metro Art, the Los Angeles Metro Rail public art program.

Haendel also produced several billboard projects featuring reproductions of his drawings, as well as text and language-based murals.

== Critical Response ==
Early in his career, many critics focused on Haendel's ties to the lineage of the 1980s; appropriation art and the conceptual underpinnings of the Pictures generation in particular.

By the mid 2010s it became clear the Haendel's work was not focused on the concerns of the Pictures generation and appropriation art, but instead was involved in a quirkier and more singular project–to build a personal language of drawing–which happened to make no distinction between original and copy, reflecting a general shift in the pervasiveness images in contemporary culture. Art Journal published several articles in 2016 investigating Haendel's different modes and models of appropriation in the legacy of the postmodernist strategy and its reception, which began a shift in the understanding of Haendel's work.

Recent criticism has focused more Haendel's insistence on the importance of Drawing as a medium, on questions of labor and value, the play of language, the complexity of ethics, and the intersection of the personal with the political. For example, David Frankel's 2011 Artforum review of “Questions for My Father,” highlights the artist's interest in the emotional ramifications of social and political structures, noting that “politics, sexuality, household habits, finances--nothing is off the table here…[while] the master’s voice is absent.”

== Collections ==
Haendel's work can be found in the permanent collections of the Art Gallery of Ontario; Colección Jumex; Deutsche Bank Collection; Solomon R. Guggenheim Museum; Hammer Museum; Kunsthalle Bielefeld; Los Angeles County Museum of Art; Museum of Contemporary Art, Los Angeles; Museum of Modern Art; the Whitney Museum of American Art, among others.

== Awards & Honors ==
Haendel has been the recipient of fellowships and grants from the Penny McCall Foundation in 2004, and the California Community Foundation and The Pollock Krasner Foundation in 2015. He was named a Guggenheim Fellow in 2026, and was an artist-in-residence at the Chinati Foundation in Marfa, TX in 2011.
