= Saint-Maixant =

Saint-Maixant may refer to:

- Saint-Maixant, Creuse, France
- Saint-Maixant, Gironde, France

== See also ==
- Saint-Maixent (disambiguation)
