= Spike Island Artspace =

Artspace in Bristol, UK

Spike Island Artspace is an arts centre and art studio complex in Bristol, England. It occupies a former Brooke Bond tea packing factory in the Spike Island neighbourhood.

It is a place for the production and exhibition of contemporary art and design and is home to over 70 artists’ studios, Spike Print Studio, as well as many other creative practitioners including designers, filmmakers, architects, animators and photographers. The centre also hosts students from the University of the West of England (UWE Bristol) Fine Art and Curating courses.

The building is also home to Emmeline cafe and bar.

== History ==
Spike Island was founded as a limited company Artspace Bristol Ltd (Artists' Studio Provision) in the mid-1970s by a group of painters, sculptors and printmakers who sought out and administered affordable studio spaces for artists in Bristol in a disused Victorian building next to Bristol's docks.

While individual artists set up their own studios, Bristol Printmakers established an open-plan space where Artspace members could freely use the printing presses and other equipment.

In the mid-1980s, it was decided that more space was needed to support artists making large-scale sculptures. The Sculpture Shed Limited was set up in 1984.

In December 1998, Artspace Bristol Limited changed its name to Spike Island Artspace Ltd. It now occupies a former Brooke Bond tea packing factory on Spike Island, Bristol.

In 2007, it began renting out space in the building as co-working and business incubator space to creative professionals and businesses, initially under the Spike Design brand and, since 2021, under the Spike Island Workspace brand.

In 2015 Spike Island became a member of the Plus Tate network which now has 35 members. The Plus Tate network brings together a variety of organisations from all parts of the UK, including Fruitmarket Gallery, John Hansard Gallery, Modern Art Oxford and Nottingham Contemporary.

== Exhibitions ==
Spike Island's gallery offers a public programme of art exhibitions.

Exhibiting artists have included Veronica Ryan, Denzil Forrester, Pacita Abad, Andy Holden, David Batchelor, Ivan Seal, Richard Long, Corita Kent and Ciara Phillips, Howardena Pindell, Young In Hong, Lawrence Abu Hamdan and Tanoa Sasraku.

== Studio artists ==
Spike Island has over 70 artist studios. As well as a number of UWE Bristol graduate artists, current studio artists include:

- David Alesworth
- Young In Hong
- Valda Jackson
- Huma Mulji

== Archives ==
Records of Spike Island Artspace are held at Bristol Archives.
