= Michal Helfman =

Israeli artist

Michal Helfman (Hebrew: מיכל הלפמן; born 1973 in Tel Aviv) is an Israeli artist living and working in Tel Aviv, Israel. She is a multidisciplinary artist working in various disciplines including sculpture, architecture, video and drawings. In order to demonstrate the relations between the reviled and the hidden forces working within society and culture, she has developed an installation platform based on the back-stage and front-stage structure of the theatrical stage as singular whole.

Helfman exhibited in numerous international exhibitions, including the 50th Biennale di Venezia, San Francisco's Institute of Visual Art, Fondazione Sandretto in Torino and the Institute of Visual Arts in the University of Wisconsin. She is currently a faculty member at the BFA and MFA programs of Bezalel Academy.

== Career ==
Tiesto (2000) was an exhibition shown in Sommer Contemporary Art in Tel Aviv. The show was named for a Dutch DJ well known in the international club scene.

In 2005 Michal Helfman represented Israeli in the 50th Venice Biennale. Helfman’s installation was titled The Owl (2003), or “Kochav Yair” in Hebrew. The work utilizes a metallic owl, mirrors, water, and light with poetry read by Roy "Chicky" Arad. The work examins contrast between the owl, a bird used as an ancient Greek symbol of wisdom, with the nightclub world.

In her installation Just Be Good to Me (2007) exhibited at The Israel Museum in Jerusalem in 2007, Helfman employed multiple disciplines and media, such as architecture, interior design, sculpture and drawing. In the film, Helfman herself dressed as a dancer (a variation of Edgar Degas' ballerinas).

In 2013, Helfman was commissioned by the Center for Contemporary Art Tel Aviv to create a site-specific installation titled Change. The large-scale piece was composed of sculpture, painting, drawing and video and touched on themes such as: migration, generational repetition and disillusionment. The show later installed in New York in 2015, where Helfman had her first solo show in the city.

== Education ==
- 1993-1997 BFA, Bezalel Academy of Art and Design, Jerusalem.

== Selected solo exhibitions ==
- 2013 "Change", CCA Tel Aviv
- 2012 "Experiments in Techniques of Awakenings," Yafo 23, Jerusalem
- 2010 "Doctor Doctor," Sommer Contemporary Art, Tel Aviv
- 2009 "The Lesson," Cardi Black Box, Milan
- 2009 "The Lesson," Tel Aviv Museum of Art
- 2008 "Mekomon", Art TLV
- 2007 "Bat Dor", Israel Museum, Jerusalem
- 2006 "Cochav Yair", Sommer Contemporary Art, Tel Aviv
- 2002 Institute of Visual Arts, University of Wisconsin
- 2001 Institute of Visual Art, San Francisco
- 2000 "Tiesto", Sommer Contemporary Art, Tel-Aviv
- 1999 "Iris", Herzlyia Museum of Contemporary Art
- 1998 "God'amn This DJ, Make My Day", The Midrasha Gallery of Art, Tel Aviv
