= Young In Hong =

South Korean artist (born 1972)

Young In Hong (born 1972) is a visual artist from Seoul, Korea, based in Bristol, England. Hong graduated with an MA and a PhD in Art from Goldsmith College in London UK in 2012. From 1992 to 1998, she studied Sculpture at Seoul National University (BA and MA). Hong currently works from her studio at Spike Island in Bristol and teaches at Bath School of Art as Reader in Performance and Textiles. She is represented by PKM Gallery in Seoul.

== Practice ==
Hong's work is research-led, revisiting specific historical moments in South Korea and reinterpreting them. She is interested in how art can have a political role, particularly from a female perspective, as South Korean history has evolved under authoritative male-dominated regimes until very recently. In her practice, Hong examines unwritten history, collective memory and undervalued cultural practices, politics of intuition and the practice of ‘equality’. Most of her works deal with those people whom society regards as minorities, and she often uses methods that are not usually associated with high art. Hong works in a range of disciplines – drawing, embroidery painting, installation and site-specific performance. For her performance projects, she collaborates with local communities, dancers, musicians and choreographers and the public.

In 2015, curator Fatoş Üstek commissioned her to create a new work for fig-2 at the ICA London, resulting in the ambitious, very complex, but at the same time very strong and resonating piece In Her Dream, a collaboration with Delfina Foundation and The Korean Cultural Centre. Hong combined baroque aesthetics with Korean Shaman music for a performance based on a detailed study of induced violence and isolation in the everyday lives of women from various countries of affiliation.

The Moon's Trick, Hong's solo exhibition at the Korean Cultural Centre UK in 2017 was part of Korea-UK/2017-18. It later travelled to Exeter Phoenix. The same year, Echoes, commissioned by Venice Agendas, launched at the Venice Biennale in May 2017 and continued to run in Margate at Turner Contemporary, Folkestone and Spike Island Bristol in December 2017. Voluntary participants were invited through open call to respond to a soundtrack consisting of a compilation of political statements by public figures ranging from Donald Trump to Michael Moore.

In her solo show We Where at PKM Gallery in Seoul in 2022, "Hong attends to the subject of “communities” that become forgotten in contemporary society. She recognizes the loss of a communal space that premodern folks believed to be real, i.e., sacred areas in which the spirits of living organisms including animals, humans, and plants could communicate through a natural connection, and wishes for the recovery of such relationships of equality." For the group exhibition Scoring the Word, Hong created Meta-hierarchical Exercise, a series of nine improvised group performances with 24 embroidered choreography-scores, presented at the Seoul Museum of Art in November 2022.

5100:Pentagon, created for the Gwangju Biennale 2014, was performed again at the Parque de la Memoria in Buenos Aires in December 2022, with local volunteers, as part of Mitos del futuro próximo curated by Sofía Dourron and Javier Villa. The movements of the performers are inspired by video footage of the Gwangju massacre in South Korea in May 1980, found in the archives of the democratic movement in the city of Gwangju.

Lubaina Himid included Hong's embroidered image Burning Love in the touring exhibition Found Cities, Lost Objects: Women in the City, curated in partnership with the Arts Council Collection in 2022/23.

Ring of Animals, Young In Hong's first solo exhibition in Belgium is shown at Kunsthal Extra City in Antwerp in early 2023. The same year, she produced a new work for Threads - breathing stories into materials, co-curated by textile artist Alice Kettle at Arnolfini in Bristol. 2023, Young In Hong received the Spike Island Commission for South West-based Artists. The resulting work was presented in Spike Island’s galleries in spring 2024 in the show Five Acts. This circular embroidered tapestry, combined with sculptures resembling animal toys, and five live performances will also be exhibited at the Art Sonje Center in Seoul in early summer 2025, in a solo show titled Young In Hong: Five Acts & A Monologue. It will be combined with the newly commissioned sound installation Accidental Paradise. Hong draws attention to the overlooked stories of Korean women’s stories, which have long been excluded from dominant historical narratives centered on male heroes. She focuses on figures such as Hyun Kyeok, a former gisaeng turned independence activist; Bu Chunhwa, a haenyeo who led anti-Japanese protests in Jeju; and Shin Soonae, a leader in the Cheonggye Garment Workers’ Union.

== Artists' Residencies ==
- 2015: Seoul Art Space Geumcheon, Seoul
- 2014 + 2015: Delfina Foundation, London
- 2014: ARKO Nomadic Artist in Residence, Chennai, India
- 2009: Art In Village, Sabuk-Gohan, Korea
- 2005: A-I-T Residency Program, Tokyo
- 2004: Ssamzie Residency Program, Seoul
- 2002: Taipei Artist Village, Taipei
- 1996: Vermont Studio Center, Johnson, U.S.

== Awards ==
- 2023: Spike Island Commission for South West-based Artists
- 2019: Korea Artist Prize 2019 (shortlist)
- 2012: SINAP (Sindoh Artist Support Program), Korea
- 2011: Kimsechoong Art Prize, Seoul
- 2003: Suk-Nam Art Prize, Suk-Nam Art Foundation, Seoul

== Exhibitions/Performances ==
- 2026: Gifting, Museum of East Asian Art, Bath
- 2026: Entangled and Woven, The Whitworth, Manchester
- 2026: Art Basel, Premiere
- 2025: Amateur Composer, PKM Gallery Seoul (solo)
- 2025: Young In Hong: Five Acts & A Monologue, Art Sonje Center, Seoul (solo)
- 2024: Young In Hong: Five Acts, Spike Island, Bristol (solo)
- 2023: Threads - breathing stories into materials, Arnolfini, Bristol
- 2023: Ring of Animals, Kunsthal Extra City, Antwerp
- 2022: Found Cities, Lost Objects: Women in the City, touring exhibition, curated by Lubaina Himid (in partnership with Arts Council Collection), Birmingham Museum & Art Gallery, Southampton City Art Gallery and Royal West of England Gallery, Bristol
- 2022/23: Whose Story Is This, Museum of Contemporary Art Busan
- 2022/23: Myths of the near future, Parque de la Memoria, Buenos Aires
- 2022: Scoring the Words, Seoul Museum of Art, Seoul Korea
- 2022: We Where, PKM Gallery Seoul (solo)
- 2021: Our Rhythms Have Been Out of Sync in The Past, DMZ Art & Peace Platform 2021, Goseong Korea
- 2020: MaytoDay project, Gwangju Biennale
- 2020: Go On Being So, Newlyn Art Gallery
- 2020: Korean Eye 2020: Creativity and Daydream, touring exhibition, Lotte World Tower Mall Seoul, Saatchi Gallery London, The State Hermitage Museum Saint Petersburg
- 2019/20: Korea Art Prize, National Museum of Modern and Contemporary Art, Seoul (MMCA)
- 2019: Let Us Dance, Arnolfini, Bristol UK
- 2018: The Moon’s Trick, Exeter Phoenix
- 2017: Venice Agendas 2017: The Contract, Turner Contemporary, Margate
- 2017: 5100: Pentagon, Royal Academy of Arts London, as part of Block Universe
- 2017: The Moon's Trick, Korean Cultural Centre, London
- 2017: Echoes 2017, Venice Biennial
- 2016: La Triennale di Milano
- 2016: Grand Palais, Paris
- 2016: A Fire that Never Dies, Cecilia Hillström Gallery, Stockholm
- 2015/16: [ana] please keep your eyes closed for a moment, Maraya Art Centre, Sharjah
- 2015: In Her Dream, fig-2 6/50, ICA Institute of Contemporary Arts London
- 2014: Image Unidentified, Artsonje Centre, Seoul
- 2014: Gwangju Biennale
- 2014: Delfina Foundation, London

== Collections ==
- Arts Council Collection
- Gyeonggi Museum of Modern Art, Korea
- Seoul Museum of Art
