= Gregor Muir =

British art curator

Gregor Muir is Director of Collection at the Tate museum, with offices at Tate Britain and Tate Modern. He was previously Executive Director of the Institute of Contemporary Arts (ICA) in London from 2011 to 2016 where he oversaw its transformation. He was also the director of Hauser & Wirth, London, at 196a Piccadilly, from 2004 to 2011. Prior to that he was the Kramlich Curator of Contemporary Art at Tate between 2001 and 2004.

== Life and career ==
Muir continues to curate exhibitions at Tate Modern, such as Robert Rauschenberg (2026 - 2027), Richard Long (2025 - 2026), Anthony McCall (2023–2024) and Andy Warhol (2019), the latter subsequently touring to the Ludwig Museum in Cologne, AGO Toronto, and Aspen Art Museum. Since 2016, he has overseen seven international acquisition committees and is also responsible for acquiring numerous art works for the Tate Collection with the support of the Tate Americas Foundation (TAF) and Tate International Council (IC). Muir has been directly responsible for the acquisition of some of the first indigenous art works to enter the Tate Collection.

While Executive Director at the ICA, Gregor Muir was responsible for exhibitions by Isa Genzken, Betty Woodman, Lis Rhodes, David Robilliard, Prem Sahib, Trojan, Bruce Nauman and Dennis Morris. In 2015 and 2016, Muir curated Frieze Talks, London, with a range of speakers including Wolfgang Tillmans, Anicka Yi and Lee Scratch Perry. At Hauser & Wirth (2004–2011), Muir curated and produced exhibitions by Tracey Emin & Louise Bourgeois, Henry Moore at Hauser & Wirth Zurich and London, Lynda Benglis, Andy Warhol, Joan Mitchell, Francis Picabia, and emerging artists at the time such as Jakub Julian Ziolkowski and Zhang Enli.

Muir was instrumental in programming 'Hauser & Wirth Coppermill', a vast industrial shed off Brick Lane in East London, with ambitious exhibitions by Christoph Buchel, Martin Kippenberger and Deiter Roth. He also curated group exhibitions such as 'Old School' (2007) bringing together seminal paintings by Old Master and Contemporary artists such as Bruegel, Cranach, John Currin and Elizabeth Peyton. In 2005, he curated 'London in Zurich' at Hauser & Wirth Zurich, featuring works by Lali Chetwynd (now Monster Chetwynd) and Daniel Sinsel.

Between 2001 and 2004, Muir was the Kramlich Curator of Contemporary Art at Tate Modern where he worked on numerous film and video acquisitions for the Tate Collection (to include ambitious co-acquisitions of works across multiple museums by Bruce Nauman and Bill Viola), as well as curating contemporary art displays from the Tate Collection, including a special focus on Robert Morris' 1971 Tate Gallery exhibition and Carl Andre's 'Equivalent' series ("the bricks"). Along with Jessica Morgan he curated the exhibition 'Time Zones' at Tate Modern, one of the museum's first exhibitions dedicated to the moving image [featuring works by Anri Sala, De Rijke / de Rooij and Fiona Tan] as well as 'In-a-Gadda-da-Vida' at Tate Britain with Damien Hirst, Angus Fairhurst and Sarah Lucas.

In 1997, Muir worked at the Lux Gallery in Hoxton Square, in the emerging cultural quarter of Shoreditch, showing works by artist such as Kutlug Ataman, Jane & Louise Wilson, jodi.org and Carsten Holler.

In 1997, he co-curated 'Assuming Positions' at the ICA London, featuring works by Jorge Pardo, Tobias Rehberger and Piotr Uklański. Between 1996 and 1997, Muir curated the video programs 'Speaking of Sofas' and 'A Small Shifting Sphere of Serious Culture', including works by Tacita Dean, Peter Doig, Gillian Wearing and Jane & Louise Wilson. In 1994 he curated 'Liar', featuring works by Cerith Wyn Evans and Jake and Dinos Chapman, and in 1993 he curated 'Lucky Kunst', featuring artists such as Gary Hume and Sam Taylor-Wood.

Muir has also been a writer for numerous artist catalogues, as well as being a contributor to Parkett and frieze magazines.

Muir attended Camberwell School of Arts and Crafts between 1984–1988 where he studied Fine Art Painting. In 2024 he was awarded a doctorate by the University of the Arts London, becoming an Honorary Fellow.

== Works ==
- Lucky Kunst: The Rise and Fall of Young British Art. Aurum Press, Limited. 2010. ISBN 978-1-84513-528-7.

== Reviews ==
- Waldemar Januszczak (January 18, 2009). "Lucky Kunst: The Rise and Fall of Young British Art by Gregor Muir". The Sunday Times. [Pay-for link]
- Tracey Emin (2009-01-08). "My friend Gregor and I fell out when I miaowed during his inaugural speech | The Independent". London: The Independent.
