= Naama Arad =

Israeli sculptor and installation artist (born 1985)

Naama Arad (Hebrew: נעמה ערד) is an Israeli sculptor and installation artist born in 1985. She lives and works in Tel Aviv. Arad has had solo exhibitions both at Tel Aviv Museum of Art as well as Sommer Contemporary Art gallery in Tel Aviv, Israel. Arad gained her bachelor's degree in visual art from the Bezalel Academy of Art and Design in Jerusalem (2010), and a Masters from the School of the art Institute of Chicago (2014).

== Artistic practice ==
In her practice, Arad works to undermine structures of power and authority. Her installations are a result of an ongoing examination and interest in architectural environments and domestic objects. Using the language of the bureaucratic secretarial action, Arad converts architectural structures and foundations into everyday office materials. With an apparatus that is traditionally coded as feminine, she builds and then deconstructs images of masculine power.

Arad's conceptually artisanal and time consuming tasks are never immediately showing the amount of energy that the artist invested in their making; quite the opposite they are presented with a degree of nonchalance and carelessness that is deeply organic to Arad’s position as an artist. This contradictory position—the artist as laborious maker of objects empty of any functional, social or aesthetic value—becomes even more acute when the result carries a monumental and architectural tone; this is particularly visible in two cases: the first is a series of black lines through which the artist took control of the peculiar shape of the exhibition space hosting her solo show at the Tel Aviv Museum of Art in 2015; the second is EL AL (2012) in which a found image of a Roman arch is printed—scaled down to 355 x 291 cm—Xeroxed, shredded and finally exhibited hanging from the ceiling.

== Exhibits ==
In 2016 Arad's work was included as part of the exhibit, "Father Figures Are Hard to Find" at the New Society for Visual Arts. Arad's work was included in "Bodyscapes," an exhibit curated by Adina Kamien-Kazhdan at the Israel Museum through most of 2020.

== Education ==
- 2006–2010 Bezalel Academy of Art and Design Bachelor of Fine Arts, Jerusalem, Israel
- 2009 Akademie der Bildenden Künste Student Exchange Program, Vienna, Austria
- 2012–2014 School of the Art Institute of Chicago Master of Fine Art, Chicago, US

== Selected solo exhibitions ==
- 2018: Love Handles, Sommer Contemporary Art, Tel Aviv, Israeli
- 2017: Love Handles, Dortmunder Kunstverein, Dortmund, Germany
- 2017: Full Frontal, ACUD Gallery, Berlin, Germany
- 2016: Falling Water, Four A.M., New York, USA
- 2015: Table Mountain, Tel Aviv Museum of Art, Tel Aviv, Israeli
