= Thomas Zipp =

German artist (1966–2026)

- Born: 1 July 1966; Heppenheim, Hesse, West Germany
- Died: 3 April 2026 (aged 59)
- Education: Städelschule; Slade School of Fine Art

Thomas Zipp (1 July 1966 – 3 April 2026) was a German artist based in Berlin.

== Education ==
Zipp studied at the Städelschule, Frankfurt (with Thomas Bayrle) and the Slade School, London from 1992–1998.

== Work ==
=== Art ===
With a palette that favors burnt umber, gray and army green, his dark thinly painted canvases and sculptures often come in a careworn palette of ash white, granite grey, and much black. The paintings' stretchers sometimes extend into legs that might allow them to be carried like banners; some are paired with separately framed photo-based images of bearded 19th-century father figures or skeletons that seem to comment on the paintings. In his 2008 show "White Dada" at London's Alison Jacques Gallery, Dada-style montages and defaced pictures included a textbook description of electroconvulsive therapy and images of drugs of the medical, non-recreational kind.

=== Music ===
In music, Zipp teamed up with Felix Weber to produce "Freie Musik" in 2002, first called Nazihipiwelt. They formed a trio called ZLW-Trio with electronic artist Sepp Löbert. Next Zipp and Weber founded the band DA ("Dickarsch", meaning fatass in English) in 2006. The band featured Stefan Branca on guitar, as well as Phillip Zaiser and Kai Erdmann. DA released the LP Nach Hause in 2007. The opening nights of Zipp's exhibitions often feature musical performances by the artist and his band.

=== Teaching ===
From 2008, Zipp was a professor at the Berlin University of the Arts.

== Death ==
Zipp died on 3 April 2026.

== Exhibitions ==
Zipp's work has been shown work in many exhibitions including “Artforum Berlin”, at Thread Waxing Space in New York City, and at Stadtische Galerie Wolfsburg. Zipp also exhibited at galleries and museums such as the Tate Modern, London, Transmission Gallery, Glasgow, and OTTO, Copenhagen.

He is represented by Galerie Guido W Baudach in Berlin; Alison Jacques Gallery in London; Patricia Low Contemporary in Gstaad; Harris Lieberman in New York; and Patrick Painter and China Art Objects Galleries in Los Angeles.

== Solo exhibitions (selection) ==
2013

- Comparative Investigation about the Disposition of the Width of a Circle, 55th International Art Exhibition, La Biennale di Venezia (cat.)
- The Pink Noise Diaries, Kaufmann Repetto, Milan
- The chips are down, Harris Lieberman Gallery, New York

2012

- England Attacked By The Americas, Kunstverein Oldenburg
- Blackout Chambers, L'Arc de Cercle & Dissociative Amnesia, Galerie Guido W. Baudach, Berlin
- 3 contributions to the theory of mass-aberrations in modern religions, Alison Jaques Gallery, London

2011

- Beyond the Superego, Galerie Krinziger, Vienna
- Achtung!: solarized deterritorialization. insanity against Protestantism (England attacked by the Americas),
- Ausstellungsraum Céline und Heiner Bastian, Berlin (cat.)
- bilobed flaps, Baronian_Francey, Brussels
- The World´s most complete Congress of Ritatin Treatments, Kunstraum Innsbruck, Innsbruck (cat.)
- The forbidden Conduct (Deviations in conservative societies), Sommer Contemporary Art, Tel Aviv

2010

- (White Reformation Co-op) Mens Sana in Corpore Sano, Kunsthalle Fridericianum, Kassel (cat.)

2009

- Faces, Kunstverein Heppenheim, Heppenheim
- The World’s Most Complete Congress Of Strange People, Galerie Guido W. Baudach, Berlin
- Mens Agitat Molem (Luther & The Family of Pills), Sammlung Goetz, Munich (cat.)

2008

- White Dada, Alison Jacques Gallery, London
- Black Pattex 78, Galería Heinrich Ehrhardt, Madrid (cat.)
- Planet Caravan? Is There Life After Death? a Futuristic World Fair, Museum Dhondt-Daehnens, Deurle / Belgium S.S.B.S.M. (sick souls by sick minds), Galerie Guido W. Baudach, Berlin

2007

- Planet Caravan? Is There Life After Death? a Futuristic World Fair, South London Gallery, London (cat.)
- Planet Caravan? Is There Life After Death? a Futuristic World Fair, Kunsthalle Mannheim, Mannheim / Museum in der Alten Post, Mülheim (cat.)
- The Family of Ornament and Verbrechen, Galerie Krinzinger, Vienna

2006

- Hier (Futuristic Mess), Galerie Rüdiger Schöttle, Munich
- Geist über Materie, Patrick Painter Inc., Santa Monica
- Uranlicht, Harris Lieberman Gallery, New York
- (God bless the (Lord Auch)), Galerie Guido W. Baudach, Berlin

2005

- Dirty Tree Black Pills, Oldenburger Kunstverein, Oldenburg (cat.)
- man muss das adjektiv abschaffen, Baronian_Francey, Brussels

2004

- Futurism Now! Samoa leads, Daniel Hug Gallery, Los Angeles
- The New Breed, Part 1 (Geist Ohne Körper), Galerie Michael Neff, Frankfurt/M. (cat.)
- The New Breed, Part 2 (Geist Ohne Körper), Galerie Parisa Kind, Frankfurt/M. (cat.)

2003

- Neroin, Galerie Guido W. Baudach, Berlin (cat.)
- The Nero Command, Marc Jancou Fine Art, New York

2001

- Exorcise the demons of perhaps, Maschenmode, Galerie Guido W. Baudach, Berlin
- Atrium Vagari (with Phillip Zaiser), Kunsthaus Essen, Essen

2000

- OD, Maschenmode, Galerie Guido W. Baudach, Berlin

== Group exhibitions (selection) ==
2008

- Vertrautes Terrain – Aktuelle Kunst in & über Deutschland, ZKM, Karlsruhe (cat.)
- Back to Black – Schwarz in der aktuellen Malerei, kestnergesellschaft, Hannover (cat.)

2007

- Euro-Centric. Part 1, Rubell Family Collection, Miami (cat.)
- Sympathy for the Devil: Art and Rock and Roll Since 1967, Museum of Contemporary Art Chicago / Museum of Contemporary Art, Miami / Museum of Contemporary Art, Montreal (cat.)
- Perspektive07, Städtische Galerie im Lenbachhaus, München
- Mystic Truths, Auckland Art Gallery, Auckland / Neuseeland (cat.)
- Made in Germany, kestnergesellschaft, Hannover (cat.)
- Kunstpreis der Böttcherstraße in Bremen 2007, Kunsthalle Bremen (cat.)

2006

- Deformation of Character, PS.1, New York
- Rings of Saturn, Tate Modern, London
- Von Mäusen und Menschen, 4th Berlin Biennale, Berlin (cat.)

2005

- When Humour Becomes Painful, Migrosmuseum für Gegenwartskunst, Zürich (cat.)

2003

- actionbutton, Hamburger Bahnhof / Museum für Gegenwart, Berlin (cat.)

== Publications (selections) ==
- Achtung! Vision: Samoa, the family of pills & the return of the subreals, Hatje Cantz, Ostfildern-Ruit 2005, ISBN 3-7757-1697-1, Ed. Guido W. Baudach
- Planet Caravan? is there life after death? a futuristic world fair, Kerber, Bielefeld/Leipzig 2007, ISBN 3-86678-096-6.
- Mens agitat molem : Thomas Zipp; Luther & The Family of Pills, Kunstverlag Goetz, München 2009, ISBN 978-3-939894-12-4, Ed. Guido W. Baudach
- Thomas Zipp, (white reformation co-op) mens sana in corpore sano, Verlag der Buchhandlung Walther König, Cologne 2010, ISBN 978-3-86560-848-2, Ed. Rein Wolfs und Guido W. Baudach
