= Eva Grubinger =

Austrian sculptor and installation artist

- Born: 1970 (age 55–56); Salzburg, Austria
- Known for: Installation art
- Website: evagrubinger.com

Eva Grubinger (born 1970 in Salzburg) is an Austrian sculptor and installation artist.

== Life ==
Between 1989 and 1995 Grubinger studied at the Hochschule der Künste Berlin where she worked with Valie Export and Katharina Sieverding. Her graduation project, C@C, or Computer Aided Curating (1993–95), provided a branching interface for visitors to explore a social network of artists. While Grubinger began her career with works that reflected and commented, in a pioneering manner, on the early development of the Internet, since the mid-1990s she has worked primarily in sculpture and installation. These phases are not, however, disconnected: her latter-day focus on materiality and space, not least social space and how it subliminally affects us, might be seen as a reaction to the immateriality of the online world.

Grubinger's method is primarily to focus on, and unsettle via various strategies, recognizable objects. Her scope in this regard is wide: she draws inspiration and iconography from such diverse worlds as seafaring, history, architecture, the theatre of politics, and the recent history of art itself, particularly Minimalism and Conceptualism. As a sculptor she has worked, accordingly, in numerous different formats and materials. Typically, however, Grubinger's approach is to take subjects that we might be familiar with, even to the point of no longer ‘seeing’ them, and alter their scale, context and material, often with attention to surfaces – for surfaces, and their deceptions, are a strong part of her interest – so that they register anew. As she works, the familiar comes to reveal not only itself but also its subtle, often politicised workings on body and mind.

In the 1990s and 2000s Grubinger had numerous residencies in Cologne, Stockholm, Paris, London, New York and Los Angeles. She was professor for Sculpture – Transmedial Space at Kunstuniversität Linz, Austria and in 2016 taught at the academy of fine arts in Düsseldorf, Germany. She lives in Berlin.

== Exhibitions ==
Grubinger's works have been shown in numerous international venues, with solo exhibitions at, among others, Abteiberg Museum Mönchengladbach; the BALTIC Centre for Contemporary Art, Newcastle; Kiasma Museum, Helsinki; Berlinische Galerie, Berlin; Tobias Nahring Gallery, Berlin and Leipzig; Schirn Kunsthalle, Frankfurt; Institute of Contemporary Arts, London; and the Österreichische Galerie Belvedere, Vienna. She has also participated in many group exhibitions in Germany and abroad, e.g. the Deichtorhallen, Hamburg; the Taipei Fine Art Museum; Krannert Art Museum, Illinois; the Marrakech Biennale; and Witte de With Center for Contemporary Art in Rotterdam.
