= Felix Weber (artist) =

German artist

Felix Weber (born August 17, 1965), also known as Schlockmaster, is a German artist.

== Biography ==
Weber was born in Munich, Germany. Since the early 1980s Weber has been focused on painting, drawing, Comic books, and music. 1991 Weber founded the label "Subversion Durch Schlock (SDS)" and began to exhibit his art. At the end of the nineties SDS was changed to Schlockweltall, and Weber began to build his presence on the internet. Sex and violence are basic elements for his cutting edge art.

Weber branched into German hip hop at the end of the 1990s. The band Schlockmaster released two 12" singles in 1997/98 and an LP in 2002. Some of the tracks were "Echte Künstler", "Rap Wigga", and "Lass Einen Wigga Scheinen". His work is sampled quite a lot in German hip-hop.

In his painting he replaced his signature heavy-black outlined comic-bookish style of the 90s with tightly rendered über-realistic figure shading. His work depicts naked people in a "world they didn't make", reflecting on philosophy and art history. His influences include Jack Kirby, Martin Heidegger, Caspar David Friedrich, Hölderlin, Friedrich Nietzsche, Jess Franco, Gary Panter, and Joe D´Amato. He has had exhibitions in places like Autocenter, Berlin, Daniel Hug Gallery, Los Angeles, Galerie Krinzinger, Vienna, and Baronian Francey, Brussels.

In music, Weber teamed up with Thomas Zipp to produce "Freie Musik" in 2002, first called Nazihipiwelt. They formed a trio called ZLW-Trio with electronic artist Sepp Löbert. Next Zipp and Weber founded the band DA ("Dickarsch", meaning fatass in English) in 2006. The band featured Stefan Branca on guitar, as well as Phillip Zaiser and Kai Erdmann. DA released the LP Nach Hause in 2007.
