= Saint-Maixent =

Saint-Maixent may refer to:

- Saint-Maixent, Sarthe, France
- Saint-Maixent-de-Beugné, Deux-Sèvres, France
- Saint-Maixent-l'École, Deux-Sèvres, France
- Saint-Maixent-sur-Vie, Vendée, France

== See also ==
- Saint Maxentius
- Saint-Maixant (disambiguation)
