= Rona Yefman =

Israeli artist

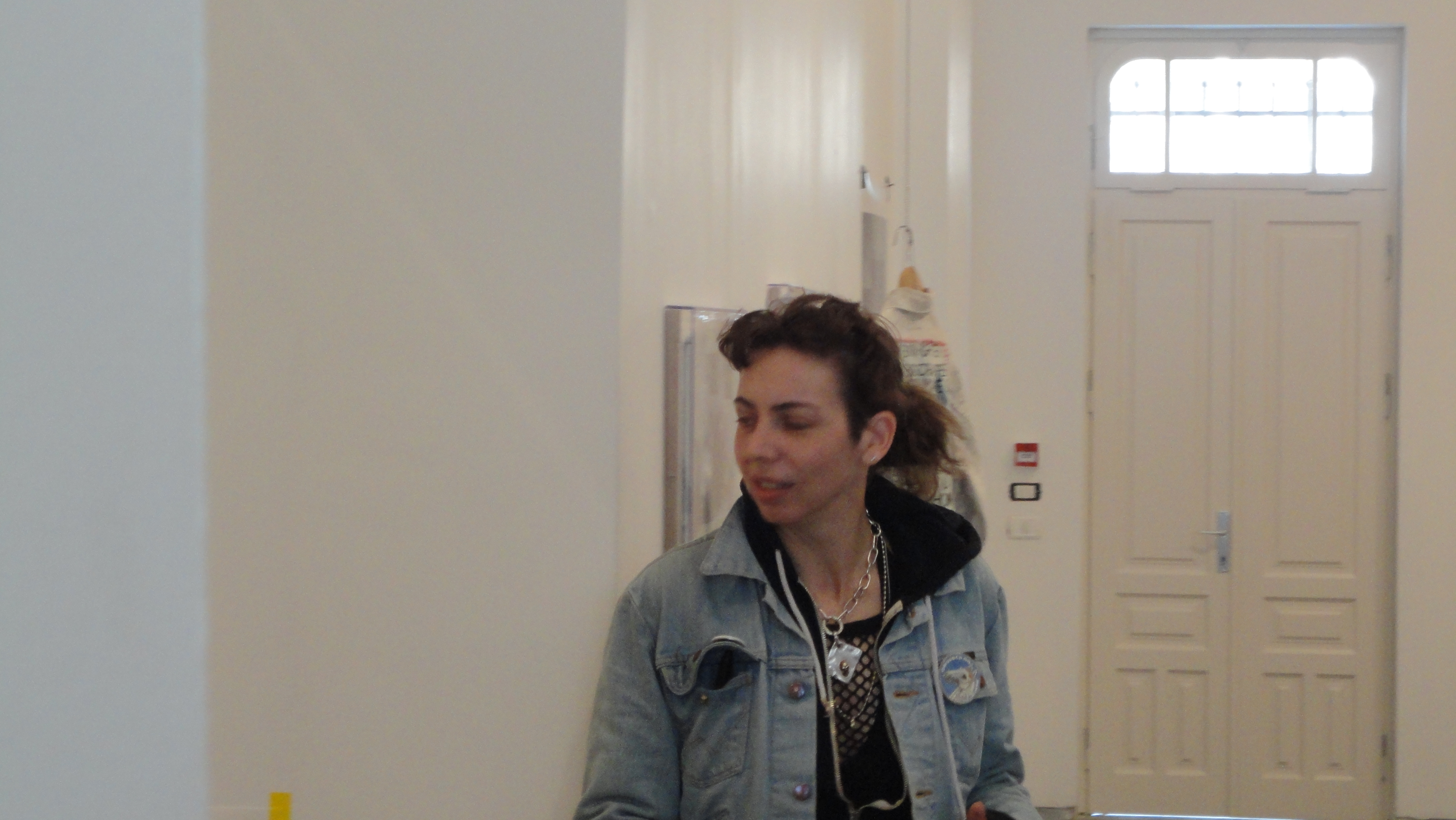

Rona Yefman (Hebrew: רונה יפמן) is an Israeli artist based in New York City working in Photography, Video and Installation. Her work explores issues of identity - mainly gender identity - focusing and collaborating with individuals who have undergone radical persona changes and construction. This body of work, reflecting a cultural development in western individualism and self-identity issues, has both documented and worked in itself as an act of rebellion. Yefman's exploration are a political - anarchic - statement seeking to overthrow the boundaries and cultural norms that oppress the individual's freedom for self-definition - "Her subjects embody the possibility of freedom, and her work as a whole is concerned with the gap between who we are, and who we want to be".

A big part of Yefman's work revolve around her brother Gil, their relationship, and his 14 years gender transformation process from male undergoing treatments toward becoming a female and then going back to male again. Another long-term project is Yefman's "Martha-A-Bouke" project focusing on an 80 year old transgender Holocaust survivor performing for her videos anonymously.

Yefman has had multiple solo exhibitions in the USA and Europe, and has participated in many group exhibitions all across the world.

== Solo exhibitions ==
- 2015, Time Kills 2, S.I.C Gallery in collaboration with Kiasma Contemporary Art Museum, Helsinki
- 2012, Tuff Enuf, Sommer Contemporary Art, Tel-Aviv
- 2011-2012, Marth A Bouke, project #4, Derek Eller Gallery, New York
- 2011, Short Stories, SculptureCenter, Long Island City
- 2010-2011, Let It Bleed, Participant Inc., New York
- 2006, 2 Flags, Sommer Contemporary Art, Tel-Aviv
- 2000, Bebe - A Family Album, Shapiro Gallery, Jerusalem
- 1999, Bunny On The Roof, Borochov Gallery, Tel-Aviv

== Yefman's brother Gil and the "Let It Bleed" project ==
"In the mid-90s her youngest brother Gil became her muse as she embarked on an intimate documentation of his unique adolescence, during a period of struggle and recovery for both of them. Isolating themselves from the conflict zone in which they were raised, the siblings created a private dream-world, fuelled by dress-up and psychological games. As they rejected societal and familial norms, their lives became a real-life version of Jean Cocteau’s infamous tale of sibling love and poison, Les Enfants Terribles. Yefman’s project spans 14 years, and includes an intimate look at Gil’s sexual transformation into life as a female, and his eventual re-transformation back to life as a biological male."

"Uncanny, maybe. Troublemakers for sure. Between reality and fiction, Rona Yefman’s brings us the flawless collaboration between photographer and actor, in this case, the artist and her sibling Gil. The protagonist, Gil: Surferess? Rollerbladeress? Transgressoress? She Adam, he Eve? Gender fluidity abounds."
