= Rona Shapiro =

Rona Shapiro became the first female rabbi to head a Conservative synagogue in Cleveland in 2007, when she became rabbi of Congregation Bethaynu in Pepper Pike.

Shapiro was ordained by the Jewish Theological Seminary of America in 1990. She worked as the executive director of the University of Berkeley Hillel from 1990 to 1999, and was the senior associate of Ma'yan: The Jewish Women's Project in Manhattan for seven years before moving to Cleveland. For six of those years she also served the Austin, Texas, congregation Agudas Achim, traveling there during the High Holy Days. She contributed a chapter to the 2000 anthology The Women's Torah Commentary: New Insights from Women Rabbis on the 54 Weekly Torah Portions.

In 2011 the majority of the congregants of Congregation Bethaynu in Pepper Pike moved to B'nai Jeshurun Congregation, which also is in Pepper Pike, since Congregation Bethaynu was for sale. Shapiro then became a rabbi at B'nai Jeshurun Congregation. In 2013 she resigned from B'nai Jeshurun Congregation and became the first female rabbi of B’nai Jacob, a Conservative synagogue in New Haven, Connecticut.

In 2016 Shapiro was named by The Forward as one of the most inspiring rabbis in America. She is also a participant in the Shalom Hartman Institute Rabbinic Leadership Initiative and the Institute for Jewish Spirituality. She resides in Woodbridge, CT with her husband, David Franklin; they are the parents of two daughters.
