= Institute of Contemporary Arts =

Art and cultural centre in London

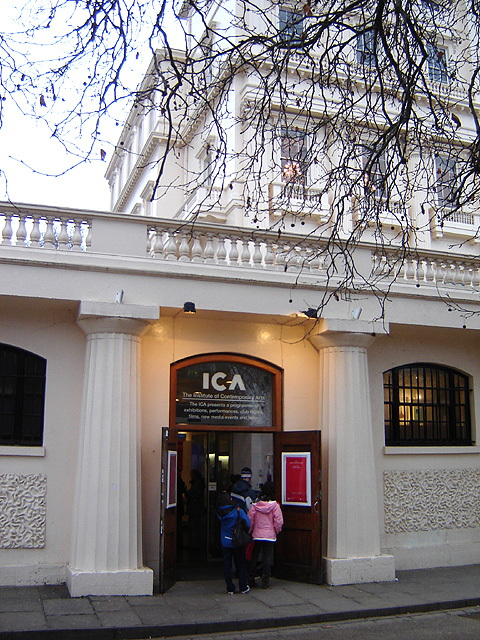

- Location within Central London
- Established: 1946
- Location: The Mall, London (offices in Carlton House Terrace)
- Coordinates: 51.506608°N 0.13061°W
- Director: Bengi Unsal
- Public transit access: Charing Cross; Charing Cross
- Website: www.ica.art

The Institute of Contemporary Arts (ICA) is an artistic and cultural centre on The Mall in London, just off Trafalgar Square. Located within Nash House, part of Carlton House Terrace, near the Duke of York Steps and Admiralty Arch, the ICA contains galleries, a theatre, two cinemas, a bookshop and a bar.

== History ==
The ICA was founded by Roland Penrose, Peter Watson, Herbert Read, Peter Gregory, Geoffrey Grigson and E. L. T. Mesens in 1946. The ICA's founders intended to establish a space where artists, writers and scientists could debate ideas outside the traditional confines of the Royal Academy. The model for establishing the ICA was the earlier Leeds Arts Club, founded in 1903 by Alfred Orage, of which Herbert Read had been a leading member. Like the ICA, this too was a centre for multi-disciplinary debate, combined with avant-garde art exhibition and performances, within a framework that emphasised a radical social outlook.

The first two exhibitions at the ICA, 40 Years of Modern Art and 40,000 Years of Modern Art, were organised by Penrose, and reflected his interests in Cubism and African art, taking place in the basement of the Academy Cinema, 165 Oxford Street. The Academy Cinema building included the Pavilion, a restaurant, and the Marquee ballroom in the basement; the building was managed by George Hoellering, the film, jazz and big band promoter. In 1968 Jasia Reichardt curated the exhibition on computer generated art and music: Cybernetic Serendipity at the ICA.

With the acquisition of 17 Dover Street, Piccadilly, in May 1950, the ICA was able to expand considerably. Ewan Phillips served as the first director. It was the former residence of Vice Admiral Horatio Nelson. The gallery, clubroom and offices were refurbished by modernist architect Jane Drew assisted by Neil Morris and Eduardo Paolozzi. Paolozzi decorated the bar area and designed a metal and concrete table with student Terence Conran.

Ewan Phillips left in 1951, and Dorothy Morland was asked to take over temporarily, but stayed there as director for 18 years, until the move to the more spacious Nash House. The critic Reyner Banham acted as assistant Director during the early 1950s, followed by Lawrence Alloway during the mid- to later 1950s. In its early years, the Institute organised exhibitions of modern art including Picasso and Jackson Pollock. A Georges Braque exhibition was held at the ICA in 1954. The first woman to exhibit there was Fahrelnissa Zeid in 1956. It also launched Pop art, Op art, and British Brutalist art and architecture. The Independent Group met at the ICA in 1952–1962/63 and organised several exhibitions, including This Is Tomorrow.

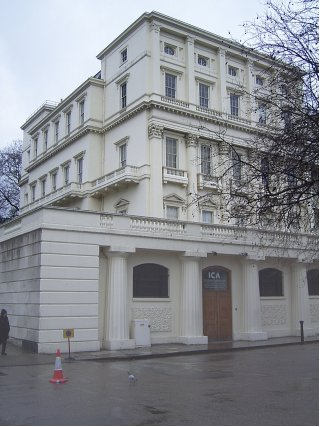
Institute of Contemporary Arts

With the support of the Arts Council, the ICA moved to its current site at Nash House in 1968, the refurbishment again designed by Jane Drew. For a period during the 1970s the institute was known for its often anarchic programme and administration. Norman Rosenthal, then director of exhibitions, was once assaulted by a group of people who were living in the upper floors of the building: a bloodstain on the wall of the administrative offices is preserved under glass, with a note reading "this is Normans's blood". Rosenthal claims the group which assaulted him included the actor Keith Allen.

Bill McAllister was ICA Director from 1977 to 1990, when the Institute developed a system of separate departments specializing in visual art; cinema; and theatre, music and performance art. A fourth department was devoted to talks and lectures. Iwona Blazwick was Director of Exhibitions from 1986 to 1993. Other notable curatorial and programming staff have included Lisa Appignanesi (deputy director of ICA and Head of Talks, 1980–90), James Lingwood (Exhibition Curator, 1986–90), Michael Morris (Director of Theatre), Lois Keidan, (Director of Live Arts, 1992–97), Catherine Ugwu, MBE (deputy director of Live Arts, 1991–97), Tim Highsted (deputy director of Cinema, 1988–95) and Jens Hoffmann (Director of Exhibitions, 2003–07).

Mik Flood took over as director of the ICA in 1990 after McAllister's resignation. Flood announced that the Institute would have to leave its Mall location and move to a larger site, a plan that ultimately came to nothing. He also oversaw a sponsorship scheme whereby the electrical goods company Toshiba paid to have their logo included on every piece of ICA publicity for three years, and in effect changed the name of the ICA to ICA/Toshiba. He was replaced as Director in 1997 by Philip Dodd. In 2002, the then ICA Chairman Ivan Massow criticised what he described as "concept art", leading to his resignation.

From 2003 to 2009, the ICA hosted Comica, the London International Comics Festival, usually during periods when the ICA had no other events or exhibitions scheduled.

Following the departure of Dodd, the ICA appointed Ekow Eshun as artistic director in 2005. Under Eshun's directorship the Live Arts Department was closed down in 2008, the charge for admission for non-members was abandoned (resulting in a reduction of membership numbers and a cash shortfall), the Talks Department lost all its personnel, and many commentators argued that the Institute suffered from a lack of direction. A large financial deficit led to redundancies and resignations of key staff. Art critic JJ Charlesworth saw Eshun’s directorship as a direct cause of the ICA's ills; criticizing Eshun's reliance on private sponsorship, his cultivation of a "cool" ICA brand, and his focus on a cross-disciplinary approach that was put in place "at the cost", Charlesworth wrote "of a loss of curatorial expertise." Problems between staff and Eshun, sometimes supported by the Chairman of the ICA Board, Alan Yentob, led to fractious and difficult staff relations. Eshun resigned in August 2010, and Yentob announced he would leave.

In January 2011, the ICA appointed as its Executive Director Gregor Muir, who took up his post on 7 February 2011. Muir stepped down in 2016 and was replaced by former Artists Space director Stefan Kalmár. Kalmár was the first non-British Director of the ICA and made the cinemas fully independent. He announced his departure from the role after five years in August 2021 saying 'the moment now feels right for me to hand over to the next generation,' but also citing concerns around the loss of the 'arm's length principle' in UK arts funding and increasing Right-Wing attacks in the UK post-Brexit. The ICA was hit hard by closures due to the Covid-19 pandemic lockdowns from mid-March 2020 and reopened in July 2021 with War Inna Babylon: the Community’s Struggle for Truths and Rights, an exhibition focused on the “various forms of state violence and institutional racism targeted at Britain’s Black communities." In 2024, a group of former ICA workers alleged that the ICA fired them for their Palestinian advocacy. In response, artist Rheim Alkadhi pulled her exhibition out of London’s Institute of Contemporary Art (ICA) saying the organisation does not take accountability for retaliating against workers who have expressed solidarity with Palestine.

From 2012 to 2020 the gallery was refurbished by David Kohn Architects, a process that revealed some of the 1968 works by Jane Drew and Maxwell Fry, practicing as Fry Drew and Partners.

In 2024 Sanchez Benton Architects completed a project that saw the entrance foyer, bookshop, cafe and gallery reconfigured to create an accessible and multifunctional space for visitors. Their transformation of the main gallery, in particular, saw the removal of an outdated lift, making this space easier to navigate using an accessible ramp. Amendments to the existing design also included uncovering windows to allow more natural light in and the intentional replacement of harsh fluorescent lights to minimise hypersensitivity for neurodivergent visitors.

=== Notable exhibitions, talks, film festivals and music events ===
- 1948: 40 Years of Modern Art, the ICA's first exhibition organised by Herbert Read and Roland Penrose (10 February to 8 March, at Academy Hall, Oxford Street, W1).
- 1948: 40,000 Years of Modern Art, the ICA's second exhibition organised by Herbert Read and Roland Penrose.
- 1948: The ICA and Mars Group organise a symposium on architecture.
- 1950: London-Paris: New Trends in Painting and Sculpture launched the Geometry of Fear sculptors.
- 1950: James Joyce: His Life and Work, first show in Dover Street at the ICA.
- 1951: Growth and Form, organised by Richard Hamilton.
- 1951: First ICA film screenings at the French Institute.
- 1952 Sixteen Young Sculptors, organised by David Sylvester.
- 1952: Formation of the Young Group, consisting of artists Nigel Henderson, Toni del Renzio, Reyner Banham and Richard Lannoy, facilitated by the ICA Director Dorothy Morland.
- 1953: Herbert Read delivers four lectures under the title "The Aesthetics of Sculpture".
- 1953: Alfred Barr, Director of New York City's Museum of Modern Art (MoMA) delivers a lecture entitled "They hate Modern Art or Patterns of Philistine Power".
- 1953: The Independent Group, including the sculptor Eduardo Paolozzi, begins meeting at the ICA. This leads ultimately to the launch of British Pop Art. The leading theorist of the group, Lawrence Alloway, lectures on "The Human Head in Modern Art".
- 1953: Pierre Schaeffer performs Musique Concrète.
- 1953: Parallel of Life and Art, organised by Nigel Henderson, Eduardo Paolozzi and Alison and Peter Smithson.
- 1953: Jackson Pollock features in a show called Opposing Forces.
- 1954: Man Ray gives a talk on 'Painting of the Future and the Future of Painting'.
- 1955: UK Premiere of Kenneth Anger films.
- 1955: Public discussion on the works of Francis Bacon with Lawrence Alloway and Victor Willing.
- 1955: Man, Machine and Motion, curated by Richard Hamilton.
- 1956: Richard Wollheim delivers a lecture entitled "Art and Theory".
- 1956: Meyer Shapiro delivers a lecture entitled "Recent Abstract Painting in America".
- 1956: Ernst Gombrich delivers a lecture entitled "Aspects of Communication through Painting".
- 1956: Reyner Banham gives a talk on Revaluation and Futurism.
- 1956: Richard Hamilton, Anthony Hill and Colin St. John Wilson in public discussion "Revaluation of Duchamp", the first revaluation of Marcel Duchamp in Britain after the Second World War.
- 1957: First UK screening of the French film Hurlements en Faveur de Sade by Guy Debord, which caused riots when shown in Paris because it mostly featured a black screen and silence.
- 1957: Paintings by Chimpanzees, curated by future ICA director Desmond Morris.
- 1958: British Caribbean Writers talk by Stuart Hall and V.S Naipaul.
- 1966–68: Yoko Ono contributes to Destruction in Art Symposium orchestrated by Gustav Metzger.
- 1967: Ian Dury, Pat Douthwaite, Herbert Kitchen and Stass Paraskos exhibition Fantasy and Figuration. Dury was to become a celebrated punk rock musician, and Stass Paraskos had, in 1966, been the last artist in Britain to be successfully prosecuted for showing obscene paintings under the Vagrancy Act 1838.
- 1968: The inaugural exhibition in the Nash building The Obsessive Image features a waxwork model of a dead hippie by Paul Thek. The Cybernetic Serendipity exhibition features computers, pulsing TV screens and a mosaic floor made of coloured lights.
- 1976: Mary Kelly exhibits the first part of Post-Partum Document, an exploration (developed between 1973 and 1979) of the mother-child relationship. Each section highlights a formative moment in her son’s mastery of language, along with the artist's sense of loss. Informed by feminism and psychoanalysis, the work alternately adopts the voice of the mother, the child, and an analytic observer. The installation provoked tabloid newspaper outrage because of stained (but laundered) nappy liners incorporated in "Documentation I".
- 1976: A retrospective of COUM Transmissions (a performance group whose core subsequently formed Throbbing Gristle) entitled Prostitution features sanitary towels and explicit photographs. The exhibition was held concurrently with Mary Kelly's Post-Partum Document.
- 1977: Adam and the Ants, at this point known simply as The Ants, perform their official debut concert in the restaurant. Singer Adam Ant's stage costume at this point includes a bondage hood and other leather garments. The performance is aborted by venue staff after one song, "Beat My Guest" (later the B-side of major hit single "Stand and Deliver"), but is resumed and completed later that day in the main theatre during the interval of a performance by John Dowie and Victoria Wood.
- 1980: Sees several important feminist art exhibitions:
  - 4–26 October, Women's Images of Men (curated by Joyce Agee, Jacqueline Morreau, Catherine Elwes, Pat Whiteread);
  - 30 October–9 November: About Time: Video, Performance and Installation by 21 Women Artists (curated by Catherine Elwes, Rose Garrard, Sandy Nairne);
  - 14 November–21 December: Issue: Social Strategies by Women Artists (curated by Lucy R. Lippard).
- 1981: Roger Westman exhibited his scheme Walls: A Framework for Communal Anarchy.
- 1986: Helen Chadwick’s artwork Carcass, consisting of composting vegetation in a perspex tower, is removed after the gasses from the compost caused the tower to give way. The smell led to complaints from neighbours and a visit by health inspectors. The main part of the exhibition, 'The Oval Court' (a major installation of sculptural forms, photocopies of animals, vegetation and the artist's body) was bought by the Victoria and Albert Museum for its permanent collection.
- 1988: Taking Liberties: AIDS and Cultural Politics, organised by Erica Carter and Simon Watney, tackles cultural and activist responses to the AIDS crisis. A book of the same name is published by Serpent's Tail in 1989.
- 1989: Gerhard Richter shows black-and-white oil paintings of the Baader-Meinhof gang inspired by contemporary newspaper and police photographs.
- 1990: Václav Havel launches Censored Theatre, a programme of readings of suppressed plays. The first reading of Death and the Maiden by the young Chilean playwright Ariel Dorfman is performed by actors including Juliet Stevenson. Harold Pinter, in the audience, said the play "felt like it was a sequel to his own 1984 play One for the Road, which also revolved around a woman who had been raped and tortured".
- 1991: Damien Hirst’s International Affairs, his first solo exhibition in a public gallery, features glass cases containing items such as a desk, cigarette packets and an ashtray.
- 1992: The conference Preaching to the Perverted, organised with The Spanner Trust asks: "Are fetishistic practices politically radical?"
- 1993: The exhibition Bad Girls, curated by Kate Bush and Emma Dexter, celebrates a new spirit of playfulness, tactility and perverse humour in the work of six British and US women artists: Helen Chadwick, Dorothy Cross, Rachel Evans, Nicole Eisenman, Nan Goldin and Sue Williams.
- 1994: A video camera is set up in the men’s toilets of the ICA, and real-time images of urinating visitors are relayed to a screen in the theatre in a piece by Rosa Sanchez.
- 1994: The world's first cybercafe is held in the ICA theatre.
- 1995: Bear and Five Easy Pieces, films by future Turner Prize-winning artist Steve McQueen, are included in the exhibition Mirage: Enigmas of Race, Difference and Desire, curated by David A. Bailey and organised with InIVA. Other artists whose work is included are Sonia Boyce, Eddie George and Trevor Mathison of Black Audio Film Collective, Renée Green, Lyle Ashton Harris, Isaac Julien, Marc Latamie, and Glenn Ligon. An accompanying symposium, Working with Fanon, debates the legacy of Frantz Fanon within the context of art and visual representation. Speakers include Homi K. Bhabha, Paul Gilroy, Stuart Hall, bell hooks, Isaac Julien, Kobena Mercer, Raoul Peck, Ntozake Shange, Françoise Versages, and Lola Young.
- 1996: Jake and Dinos Chapman display Tragic Anatomies, sculptures of children with genitalia in place of facial features, as part of their exhibition Chapman World.
- 1996: The Onedotzero digital film festival is hosted at the ICA for the first time.
- 1996: Incarcerated with Artaud and Genet traces the legacies of the avant-garde French writers in a weekend event with participants including the writer and musician Patti Smith, writer Tahar Ben Jelloun, film maker Alejandro Jodorowsky, and theatre director Peter Sellars.
- 1997: Four female models, naked apart from high-heeled shoes, stand in mute silence in an upstairs gallery for a piece by Italian artist Vanessa Beecroft as part of the show Made in Italy.
- 2000: The annual Beck’s Futures prize is set up to celebrate the work of emerging artists, and continues at the ICA until 2005.
- 2006: The Alien Nation exhibition is presented with inIVA, exploring the complex relationship between science fiction, race and contemporary art. Among the featured artists are Laylah Ali, Hew Locke and Yinka Shonibare.
- 2008: Over a six-month period, and as part of the ICA's 60th-birthday year, the exhibition Nought to Sixty presents 60 emerging artists based in Britain and Ireland.
- 2010: The first major solo exhibition of cult figure, artist, musician and writer Billy Childish is presented at the ICA.
- 2011: The ICA hosts Bruderskriegsoundsystem, a project from Edwin Burdis, Mark Leckey, Kieron Livingston and Steven Claydon. Pablo Bronstein's exhibition Sketches for Regency Living takes over the entire ICA building for the first time in its history.
- 2015: The ICA hosts fig-2, a one-year series of week-long exhibitions curated by Fatoş Üstek that included the artists Laura Eldret, Charles Avery, Rebecca Birch, Annika Ström, Young In Hong, Beth Collar, Tom McCarthy, Shezad Dawood, Suzanne Treister, Jacopo Miliani, Kathryn Elkin, Marjolijn Dijkman, Ben Judd, Karen Mirza, Oreet Ashery, Eva Grubinger, Melanie Manchot, Bruce McLean, Vesna Petresin, and duo Wright and Vandame.
- 2015, the ICA hosted a discussion between John Roberts (philosopher) and Peter Osborne (philosopher) on Revolutionary Time and the Avant-Garde.
- 2016: The first edition of FRAMES of REPRESENTATION (FoR) film festival was launched on the 20th of April 2016. FoR was conceived to engage with new visions of cinema through the presentation of innovative and politically aware cinematic languages situated at the intersection between fiction and non-fiction. Throughout its ongoing annual event, the festival presented international and UK premieres of films by Roberto Minervini, Khalik Allah, Salome' Lamas, Wang Bing, Clement Cogitore, Teddy Williams, Nele Wohlatz, Betzabe' Garcia, Anna Zamecka, Gürcan Keltek, Pietro Marcello, Zhao Liang, Yalda Afsah, Rosa Barba, Ana Vaz, Isabel Pagliai, Dorian Jespers, Alexander Abaturov, Zhu Shengze to mention a few; masterclasses, workshops and conversations with speaker guests such as Walter Murch, Gianfranco Rosi, Laura Poitras, Joshua Oppenheimer and Carlos Reygadas amongst many others. The fifth edition of the festival originally planned for April 2020 was postponed due to the COVID-19 pandemic but due to taking place at the end of 2020.
- 2019: Image Behaviour with works from Nora Turato, Marianna Simnett, Hannah Quinlan + Rosie Hastings, Keiken, Lawrence Lek + Clifford Sage, Andros Zins-Browne, Lexachast (Amnesia Scanner, Bill Kouligas, Harm van den Dorpel), Ken Okiishi, Julie Béna, Patrick Staff, and others.
- 2019: I, I, I, I, I, I, I, Kathy Acker, the first UK exhibition dedicated to the American writer Kathy Acker (1947–1997), and her written, spoken and performed work. With works and contributions by: Reza Abdoh, Carl Gent, Leslie Asako Gladsjø, Bette Gordon, Penny Goring, Johanna Hedva, Caspar Heinemann, Every Ocean Hughes, Bhanu Kapil, Ghislaine Leung, Sophie Lewis, Candice Lin, Stephen Littman, Rosanna McNamara, Reba Maybury, The Mekons, D. Mortimer, Precious Okoyomon, Genesis P-Orridge, Raúl Ruiz, Sarah Schulman, Nancy Spero, David Wojnarowicz, and others.
- 2020: Since January 2020, INFERNO queer techno rave have held regular parties and events at the ICA, with DJs and performance commissions including by Lewis G. Burton, Samantha Togni and Sweatmother.
- In 2022 INFERNO commissioned Sweatmother to make Dyke, Just Do It, which was further developed into a full-length live performance debuting at the ICA in October 2023.
- In 2023, the installation of a d&b audiotechnik Soundscape system in the Theatre, and concerts by King Krule, Bendik Giske, Okkyung Lee, and as part of the Minus One live performance series, 'Landscapes' by Tutto Questo Sentire including musicians Sandro Mussida, Olivia Salvadori, Kenichi Iwasa, Maxwell Sterling, Jan Hendrickse, Coby Sey, Akihide Monna, light artist Charlie Hope, and video artist Rebecca Salvadori
- In 2024, concerts including Goat Girl, Keeley Forsyth, Claire Rousay, and goat jp.

== Organisation ==
Membership of the ICA is available to the general public. The ICA is constituted as a private limited company and registered charity, run by a 13-member Board and led by a Director.

=== ICA Directors ===
- Ewan Phillips 1948–1951
- Dorothy Morland 1951–1967
- Desmond Morris 1967–1968
- Michael Kustow 1968–1970
- Peter Cook 1970–1973
- Ted Little 1973–1977
- Bill McAlister 1977–1990
- Mik Flood 1990–1997
- Philip Dodd 1997–2004
- Ekow Eshun 2005–2010
- Gregor Muir 2011–2016
- Stefan Kalmar 2016–2021
- Bengi Unsal 2022–present.

== See also ==
- Artangel, founded by former Exhibition Curator James Lingwood and Director of Performance Michael Morris.
- Live Art Development Agency, founded by former Director of Live Arts Lois Keidan.
