= Igor Zeiger =

Uzbekistani-Israeli artist and curator

Igor Zeiger איגור זייגר FRSA
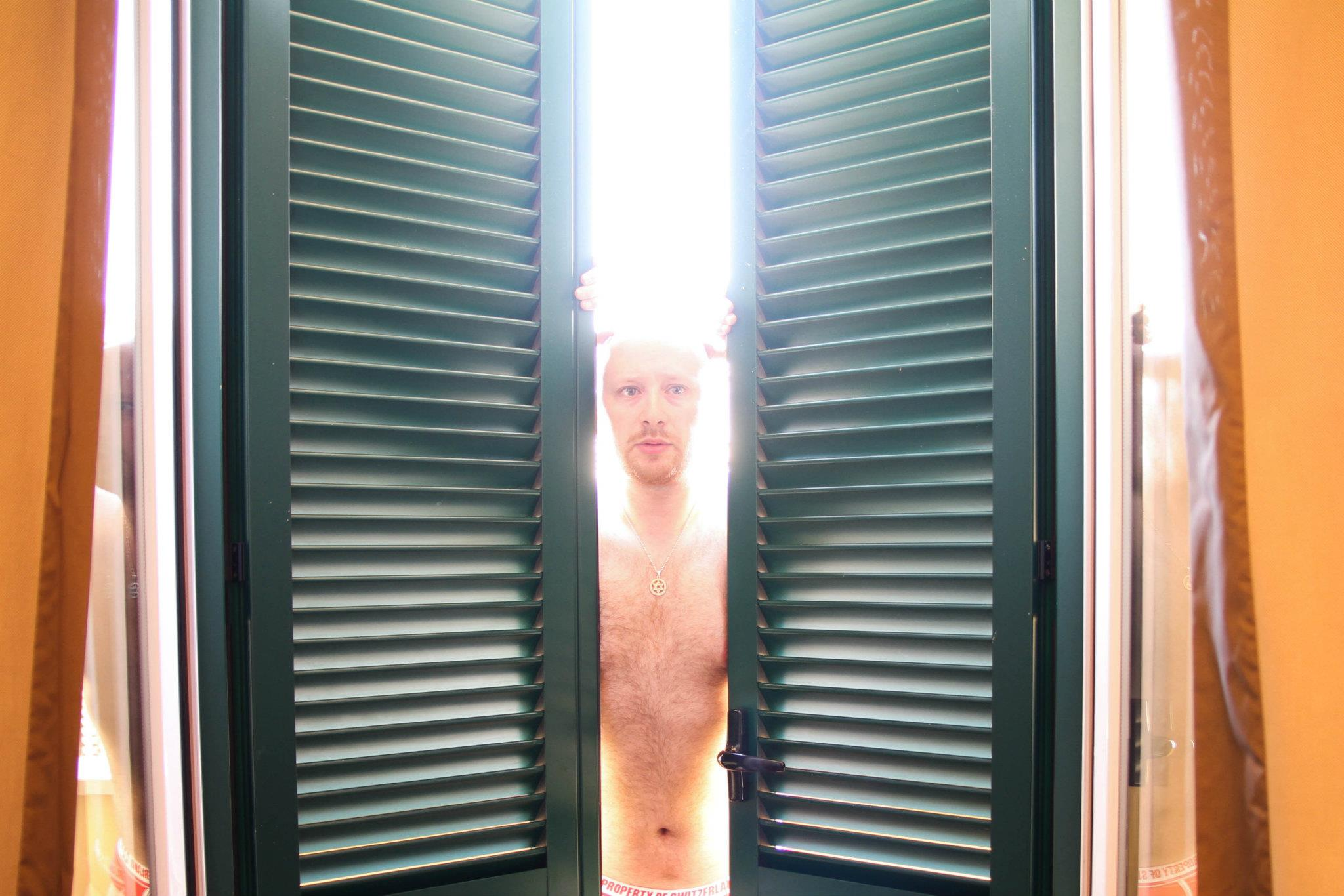
- Igor Zeiger Self Portrait
- Born: April 16, 1977 (age 49); Tashkent, Uzbekistan
- Education: Tashkent University of Information Technologies
- Known for: Photography, Curatorship
- Website: igorzeiger.com

Igor Zeiger FRSA, (Hebrew: איגור זייגר; born April 16, 1977) is an Uzbekistan-born Israeli Italian artist and curator.

== Biography ==
Igor Zeiger was born in 1977 in Tashkent, Uzbekistan to Mark Zeiger, an engineer and Larisa Yavetz, schoolteacher. He graduated from Tashkent University of Information Technologies with master's degree in communications. Zeiger immigrated to Israel in 2000, living first in kibbutz Ramat Hashofet, then Rehovot and moving to Tel Aviv in 2011. Igor Zeiger spends his time alternately and works in Italy and Jaffa.

=== Career ===
Zeiger started with documentary photography as an autodidact. He studied in Studio Gavra School of Photography in class of Sagit Zluf Namir, graduating in 2012. His mentors included David Adika, Gaston Zvi Ickowicz and Nissan N. Perez. In April 2015, Zeiger's photograph was published on the cover of "Israeli Lens" magazine, predecessor of international "Lens Magazine". In 2016, Igor's photograph was chosen as a poster photo for Paco Anselmi documentary film "Karam: A Matter Of Karma", screened at TLVFest. Zeiger lives and works in Jaffa. Zeiger is Fellow of the Royal Society of Arts. He is also a member of Israeli Association of Visual Artists and Royal Photographic Society. Zeiger founded artistic cooperative Beam Collective together with two fellow artists Maria Rosenblatt and Erica Tal-Shir in 2018.

Zeiger works have been published in the several magazines and newspapers around the world, including Haaretz, Calcalist, Sky Arte Italia, giornalettismo Italia, Devour Madrid, Israeli Lens, Lens Magazine, Noviny Kraje and The North American Post, Lidové noviny, Queer.de, NewsClick.

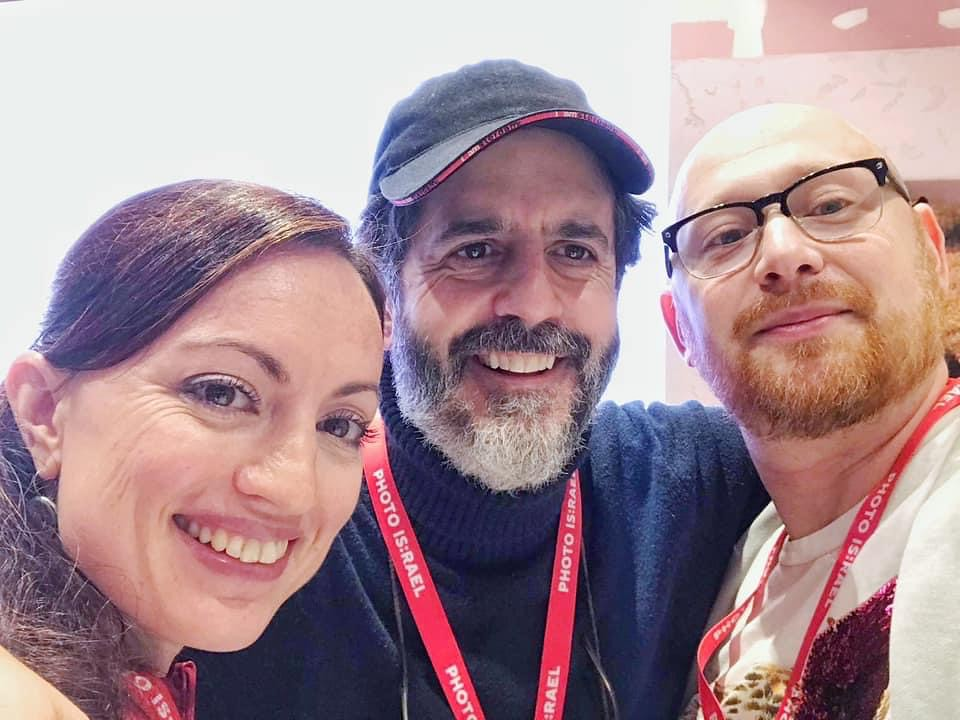
Maria Rosenblatt (left), Alec Soth(center) and Zeiger during the opening of the International Photography Festival 2019 in Israel

=== Artistic style ===
Zeiger's work is often described as being both beautiful and disturbing. He is known for his ability to capture the raw beauty of the human form, while also exploring the darker side of human nature. Zeiger's work is challenging and thought-provoking, and it has helped to redefine the boundaries of contemporary photography. His techniques extend to capturing more than just the physical attributes of his subjects. His compositions often emphasize the emotions, vulnerabilities, and narratives inherent in human experiences. As a result, viewers are presented with more than just a visual representation, but rather a broader context of the human condition.

== Exhibitions ==
=== Solo ===
- 2015 "Same as You". "Mazeh 9" Municipal Gallery. Tel Aviv.
- 2017 "Photography clarifies a place". Curated by David Adika and Gaston Zvi Ickowicz. Photo:Israel 2017, Tel Aviv.
- 2021 “Month of Photography Denver”, Biennale. Colorado Photographic Arts Center, Denver, Colorado, USA
- 2021 "Modern Renaissance". Photo:Israel 2021. Curated by Ivar van Emden. Tel Aviv.
- 2023 "Harlem Angels". Irrational Light gallery. Catania, Italy

=== Group ===
==== 2014 ====
- “Picture Peace”. Circle 1 Gallery. Berlin. Germany.
- “Picture Peace”. Beit-HaGefen Arab Jewish Culture Center. Haifa, Israel.

==== 2015 ====
- "Another". Curated by Shenhav Levi. Gan Meir Gallery. Tel Aviv Municipal LGBT Community Center. Tel Aviv.
- "Beauty Where You Find It". Curated by Connie and Jerry Rosenthal. "LightBox" Gallery. Astoria, Oregon. USA.

==== 2016 ====
- "Postage Required". Vermont Center for Photography. Brattleboro. VT. USA
- "Secret Art". "Meni House" - Bank Leumi Museum. Tel Aviv.
- "Books, gentlemen...books". Curated by Hanita Elizur. "Green House" Gallery, Tel Aviv University, Tel Aviv.
- "Intervals". Minshar Art Gallery. Tel Aviv
- "Foodprocessor - food as a tool of sending a message". Curated by Dalit Merhav, "Sarona Art" Gallery. Tel Aviv.
- "Shades of gray: perspective of an old age". Curated by Hanita Elizur. The New Gallery. Bat Yam Art Institute. Bat Yam. Israel
- “Imagination 2016”. Contemporary Israeli Art Exhibition, Bank Hapoalim Art Center, Tel Aviv.
- "Traces of real". Curated by Doron Furman. "Central" Gallery. Tel Aviv

==== 2017 ====
- "Abject Art". Curated by Doron Furman. Central Gallery. Tel Aviv
- "Secret Postcard" Project. Fresh Paint 7 Art Fair. Tel Aviv
- "Books, gentlemen...books". Curated by Hanita Elizur. Social Sciences Faculty Library & Gallery, Tel Aviv University, Tel Aviv.

==== 2018 ====
- "Queer Performance: From Gilbert & George to the Present Day". As part "Dangerous Art" exhibitions cluster curated by Svetlana Reingold. Haifa Museum of Art
- "World Fair", Canton Museum of Art, Canton, Ohio, USA
- "Secret Postcard" Project. Fresh Paint 8 Art Fair. Tel Aviv
- "From nine to five". Curated by Hanita Elizur. Artist House Gallery. Rishon LeZion, Israel
- "Nope, still can't see any difference". Curated by Olga Yerushalmy-Sorokin. Abrahams Gallery. Tel Aviv.

==== 2019 ====
- "Barbarians: a censorship archive". Mamuta Art Research Center at Hansen House. Jerusalem
- "From nine to five". Curated by Hanita Elizur. Social Sciences Faculty Library & Gallery, Tel Aviv University, Tel Aviv.
- "Facade". Curated by Doron Furman. Central Gallery. Tel Aviv
- "Impersonation". Curated by Doron Furman. Central Gallery. Tel Aviv
- "Sexy Summer in Little Tel Aviv". Curated by Yohanan Cherson. Ben Ami Gallery. Tel Aviv
- "Between Eros and Nudity". Curated by Olga Yerushalmy-Sorokin and Ksenia Nazarov. Abrahams Gallery. Tel Aviv.
- "Standart Deviation". Curated by Sagit Zluf Namir. Photo:Israel 2019, Tel Aviv.

==== 2020 ====
- “Art in Quarantine“. Curated by Diogo Marques. “Wr3ad1ng d1g1t5” Project. Lisbon. Portugal
- “Art in Isolation“. North Dakota Museum of Art. Grand Forks, North Dakota. USA
- "Re-volver". Curated by Luíza Marcolino. Fine Art Gallery. Federal University of Minas Gerais. Belo Horizonte. Brazil
- "PO-MO II". Curated by Hikmet Şahin. Art Gallery. Faculty of Fine Arts. Selçuk University. Konya. Turkey.
- "Reconstruct". Curated by Lars Deike and Richard Schemmerer. "Pride Art Atelier" gallery. Berlin. Germany.
- "Art Thru The Lens". Yeiser Art Center. Paducah, Kentucky, United States
- eSSeRCi SeNZa eSSeRCi 2020 (XIII edizione). “Dada Boom” Center of Contemporary Art and Photography. Viareggio, Lucca, Italy

==== 2021 ====
- “Twenty of Pandemics and other demons“, Aguadilla y del Caribe Museum of Art, Puerto Rico
- "Either Way", Curated by Olga Yerushalmi and Ksenia Nazarov. Central Gallery for Contemporary Art. Tel Aviv, Israel
- "The Haifa Way: 70th Anniversary of Haifa Museum of Art". Haifa Museum of Art, Israel.
- "Stone, paper, scissors and other non-childish games". Curated by Olga Yerushalmy-Sorokin and Ksenia Nazarov. Abrahams Gallery. Tel Aviv
- "Reference". La Culture Initiative. Amiad Center. Jaffa. Curated by Itay Blaish.
- "Nature: Morte?". Beam Collective Gallery. Jaffa. Curated by Erika Tal-Shir.

==== 2022 ====
- “Cloister”, Curated by Dr. Christian Seipel, Klostergalerie Museum, Zehdenick, Germany
- “Through My Eyes“, Curated by Yana Gorelik. Abrahams Gallery. Tel Aviv
- “Anything goes…“, “Flood Gallery“, Black Mountain, North Carolina, USA.
- "Nudus", The Gallerium, Toronto, Canada.
- "Self Portrait", Uppsala Konstnärsklubb, Uppsala, Sweden.
- "Two Truths and One Lie", Curated by Ksenia Nazarov and Olga Yerushalmy. Abrahams Gallery. Tel Aviv
- "Body Pride", Curated by Erez Bialer. Pan Art Gallery.
- "Call for Action", Curated by Eyal Landesman and Ya’ara Raz Haklai. Photo:Israel 2022, Tel Aviv.
- “Imagination 2022”. Contemporary Israeli Art Exhibition, Bank Hapoalim Art Center, Tel Aviv.

==== 2023 ====
- "Call for Action", Curated by Eyal Landesman and Ya’ara Raz Haklai. Photo:Israel 2022, Eilat, Israel.
- "The Copernicus World", Curated by Zlatko Krstevski, VIZANT Visual arts Center, Prilep, North Macedonia
- "Ephemeral in Art", Curated by Thanassis Raptis, Photography Center of Thessaloniki, Thessaloniki, Greece
- "Dream Archive", Curated by Vanessa Tοuzlοukof, Ametron Gallery, Chania, Greece
- "What changed in the world and what changed in you", Curated by Sergio Guerrini for "Artheka 32", Associazione Culturale di Arti Visive, Lido di Ostia, Italy
- "I Convocatoria", MIDECIANT, Innovation Centre in Art and New Technologies, The International Museum of Electrography, University of Castilla-La Mancha, Cuenca, Spain
- "Queen or King", Curated by Roberto Scala, "Garage Gallery Scala", Milan, Italy
- "New Features in Queer Photography", Curated by Aaron D. Holloway, "Pride Art Gallery", Berlin, Germany
- "Moomintroll +Comet: Life at the age of Comets", Curated by Ksenia Nazarov and Olga Yerushalmy, "Abrahams Galery", Tel Aviv
- "Letters from the 100th Year", "Department of Fine Arts Education Gallery", Gazi University, Ankara, Turkey
- "Parallax Art Fair", London, United Kingdom

==== 2024 ====
- "Carnations For Freedom". 50th Anniversary of the end of dictatorship in Portugal. Miguel Benzo Gallery. Cordoba, Spain
- “Imagination 2024”. Contemporary Israeli Art Exhibition, Bank Hapoalim Art Center, Tel Aviv.
- "POMO V". Curated by Hikmet Şahin. Art Gallery of Faculty of Fine Arts. Selçuk University. Konya. Turkey.
- “A dreamer in love with reality“. Arthika Gallery. Ostia Lido. Rome. Italy.
- "We stand with Ukraine". SoHo Project Space. New York City. USA.
- "Lux of the Agony" Flux Gallery. Bishkek, Kyrgyzstan
- "African Portraits". Kuyam Baa Art Residency. Ziguinchor, Senegal
- "Free Space to Imagiantion", Curated by Dr. Paola Pescerelli Lagorio, Roberta Savolini. "Casa Bendandi" Museum. Faenza, Italy
- “An Island Far Far Away”, Tristan Da Cunha Art Project, Curated by Morice Marcuse, Tristan da Cunha, British Overseas Territory of Saint Helena, Ascension and Tristan da Cunha.

==== 2025 ====
- “My own utopia”. Curated by prof. Paige Wideman. The Gallery of School of Art, Northern Kentucky University, Highland Heights, Kentucky, USA.
- “Imagination 2025”. Contemporary Israeli Art Exhibition, Bank Hapoalim Art Center, Tel Aviv.
- “Option art“. Lycée Comte de Foix, Andorra-La-Vella, Andorra
- “Panisraeli masculinity”. Curated by Erez Bialer. Gan Ha’Ir, Tel Aviv.
- "Sex and Politics", curated by Danila Tkachenko. Art-Icon gallery. Paris. France

==== 2026 ====
- “Panisraeli masculinity II”. Curated by Erez Bialer. Gan Ha’Ir, Tel Aviv.
- “Imagination 2026”. Contemporary Israeli Art Exhibition, Bank Hapoalim Art Center, Tel Aviv.
- "Fluid Femininity". "Pride Art" Gallery, Berlin.
- "Secret Postcard" Project. Fresh Paint 2026 Art Fair. Tel Aviv
- "No Man is an Island". Yeiser Art Center. Paducah, Kentucky.

== Curatorship ==
- 2015. "Same as You". "Mazeh 9" Municipal Gallery. Tel Aviv.
- 2016. "Faces. Israeli Portrait in classical and modern view". Mansion House Gallery, Tel Aviv.
- 2017. "Nonplace: dance and movement". Central Gallery for Contemporary Art, Tel Aviv
- 2020. "Eros and Thanatos". "Beam Collective" gallery. Jaffa.
- 2020. "Curated by Social Networks". "Beam Collective" gallery. Jaffa.
- 2021. "Same as You. Take Two". "Beam Collective" gallery. Jaffa.
- 2022. "Ansel Adams, Photographs of Japanese-American Internment at Manzanar". "Irrational Light" Gallery, Catania.
- 2024. "Resilient Gaze: Dorothea Lange's Odyssey". "Irrational Light" Gallery, Catania.

== Collections ==
Igor Zeiger works are in permanent collections of Haifa Museum of Art, Museum of Arts of Uzbekistan, Nukus Museum of Art, Contemporary art Museum of Uzbekistan in Urgench, A. Kasteyev State Museum of Arts in Almaty, Jerusalem Municipal Library, Yeiser Art Center, Klostergalerie Museum, Zehdenick; Caribbean Art Museum, Puerto Rico and United Kingdom Government Art Collection

== Bibliography ==
- The Edge. Beam Collective. 2015. ISBN 978-1320787741.
- "UN//TITLED", An Anthology of Queer Contemporary Art (2016-2020). Published by "Balaclava.q"
- My Gay Eye: Sex Utopia. Rinaldo Hopf verlag. 2022. ISBN 978-3887699796.

== See also ==
- Visual arts in Israel
- Italian art
