= Amira Ziyan =

Israeli photographer (born 1977)

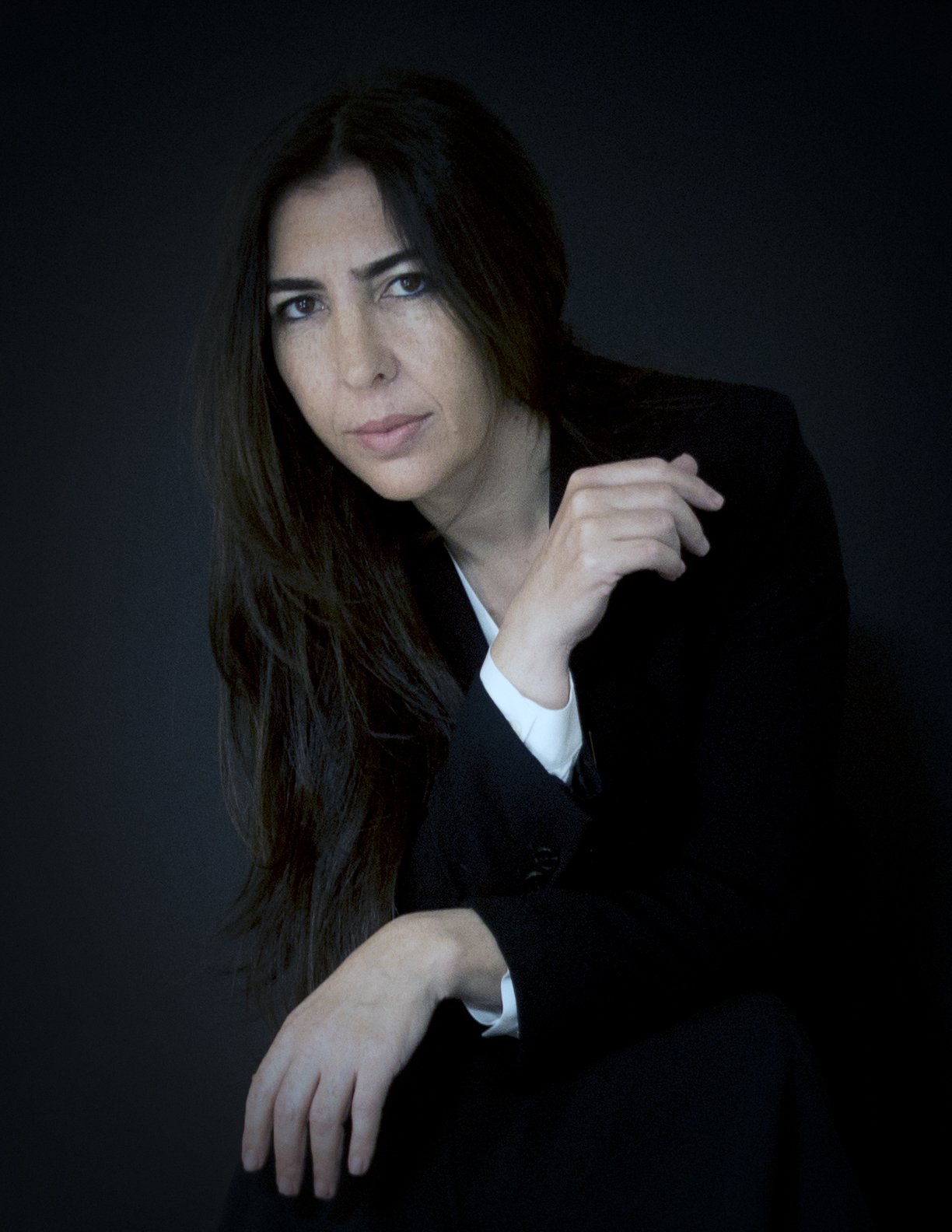
- Born: 1977 (age 48–49)

Amira Ziyan (Arabic: أميرة زيان; born October 16, 1977) is an Israeli Druze photography artist and art teacher.

== Early life ==
Ziyan was born into a traditional Druze family in the village of Yarka, Israel. Both of her parents were religious. Ziyan has seven brothers and three sisters. As a child, she faced many restrictions as a woman, but despite these limitations, she decided to pursue higher education.

In 1999, she graduated as an industrial chemistry engineer from the Western Galilee College in Acre. In 2003, she received a teaching certificate in administration from the Weizmann Institute in Haifa.

In 2004, her father suffered a stroke. Her brother, who owned a photo development laboratory, was forced to replace her father at the concrete factory and asked her to help him in the photo shop. Working in the photo shop sparked her interest in the field and encouraged her to pursue it further. In 2007, she began studying for a bachelor's degree in art and French at the University of Haifa, which she completed in 2010. She continued her studies with a master's degree in art from the University of Haifa, which she completed in 2012.

During her academic studies, she excelled in photography and won prizes and grants, including the Sa'ar Afroni Artist Grant in 2008, the Spielmann Prize for Photography Students from the Spielmann Institute in Tel Aviv in 2009, and an award for outstanding achievement in her thesis from Friends of the University of Haifa in 2010. After completing her studies, she continued to work in the field of photography. She has been highly praised for her artistic achievements and has won numerous awards, including the Encouragement Prize for Plastic Arts from the Israeli Ministry of Culture and Sport in 2017, the Becky Dakel Commendation from the Association for Women's and Gender Research in 2020, and the Oscar Handler Prize from Kibbutz Lohamei HaGetaot in 2022.

Her works are included in collections such as the Israeli Knesset, the Haifa Museum of Art, the Umm al-Fahm Art Gallery, the Alexander Tutsek Foundation in Munich, and in private collections.

Between 2012 and 2024, she was a member of a joint Jewish-Arab cooperative gallery in Kabrie, she was a member of the judging panel at the International Photography Festival 2021, member and committee for the study of women and gender 2023, Member of the Interdisciplinary Arts Vocational Committee of the Ministry of Education 2024, member of the rotating exhibitions committee at the Faculty of Medicine, Hebrew University 2024 and a member of the Druze culture section 2024.

== Artistic practice ==
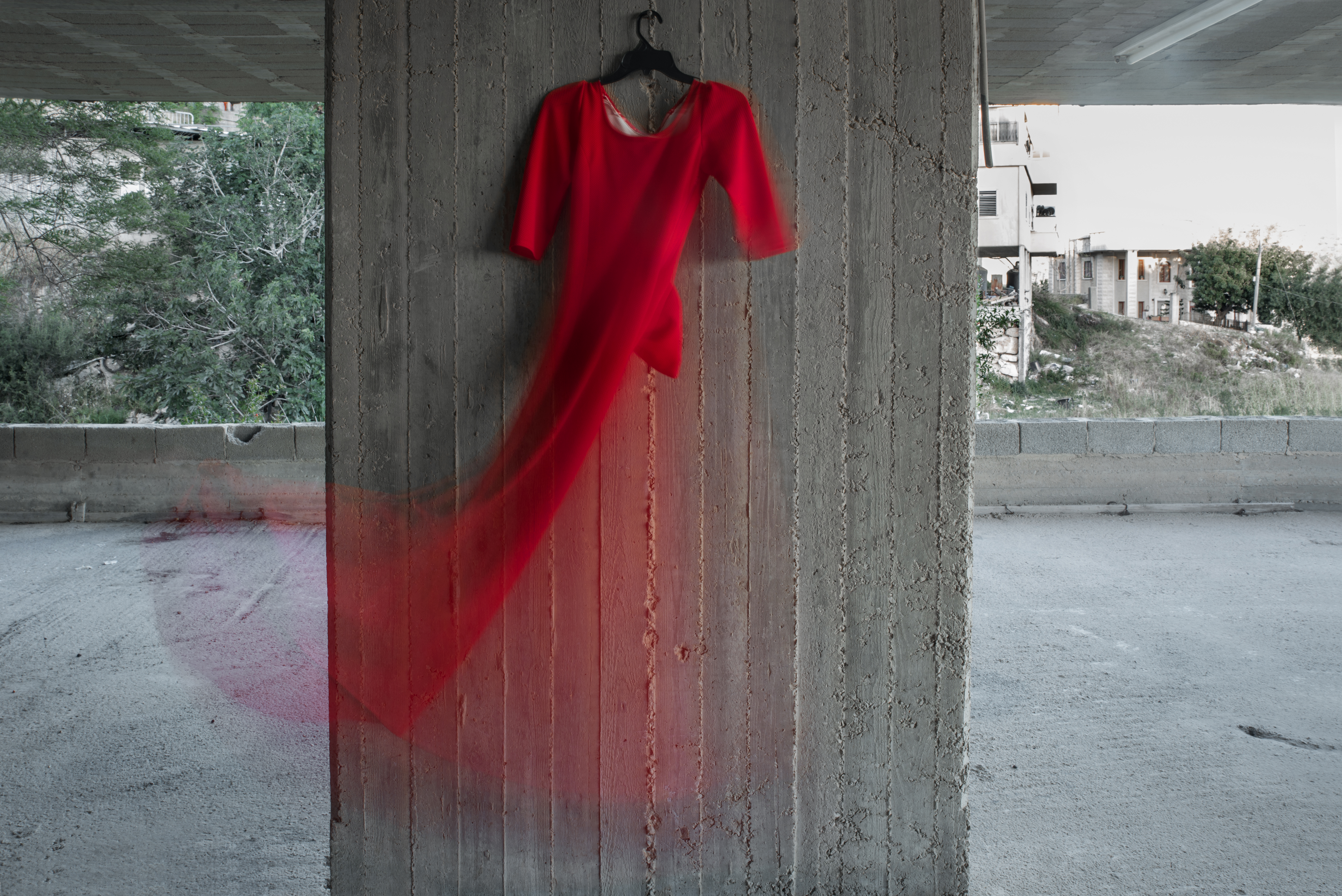
Red Dress, 2016

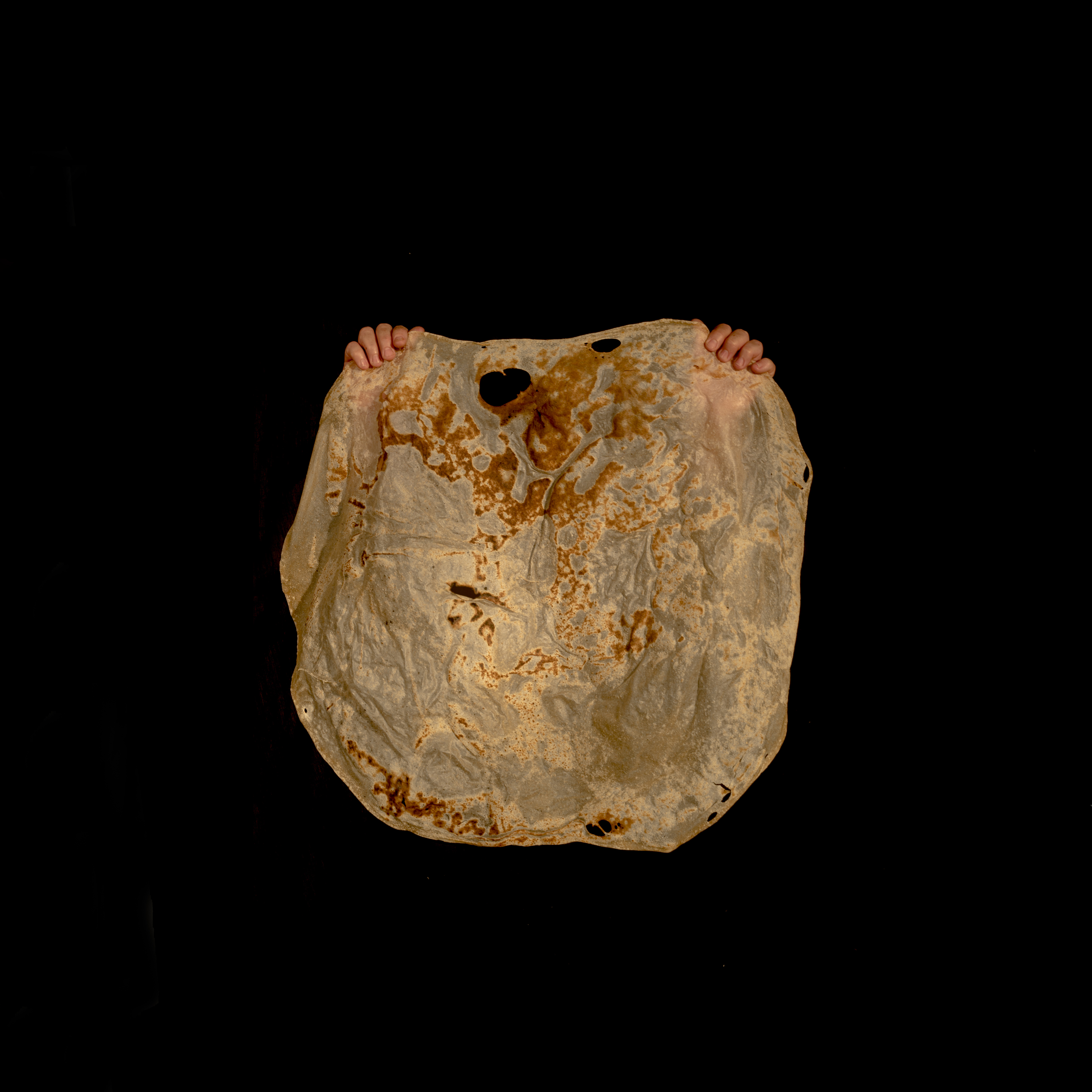
Samira, 2017

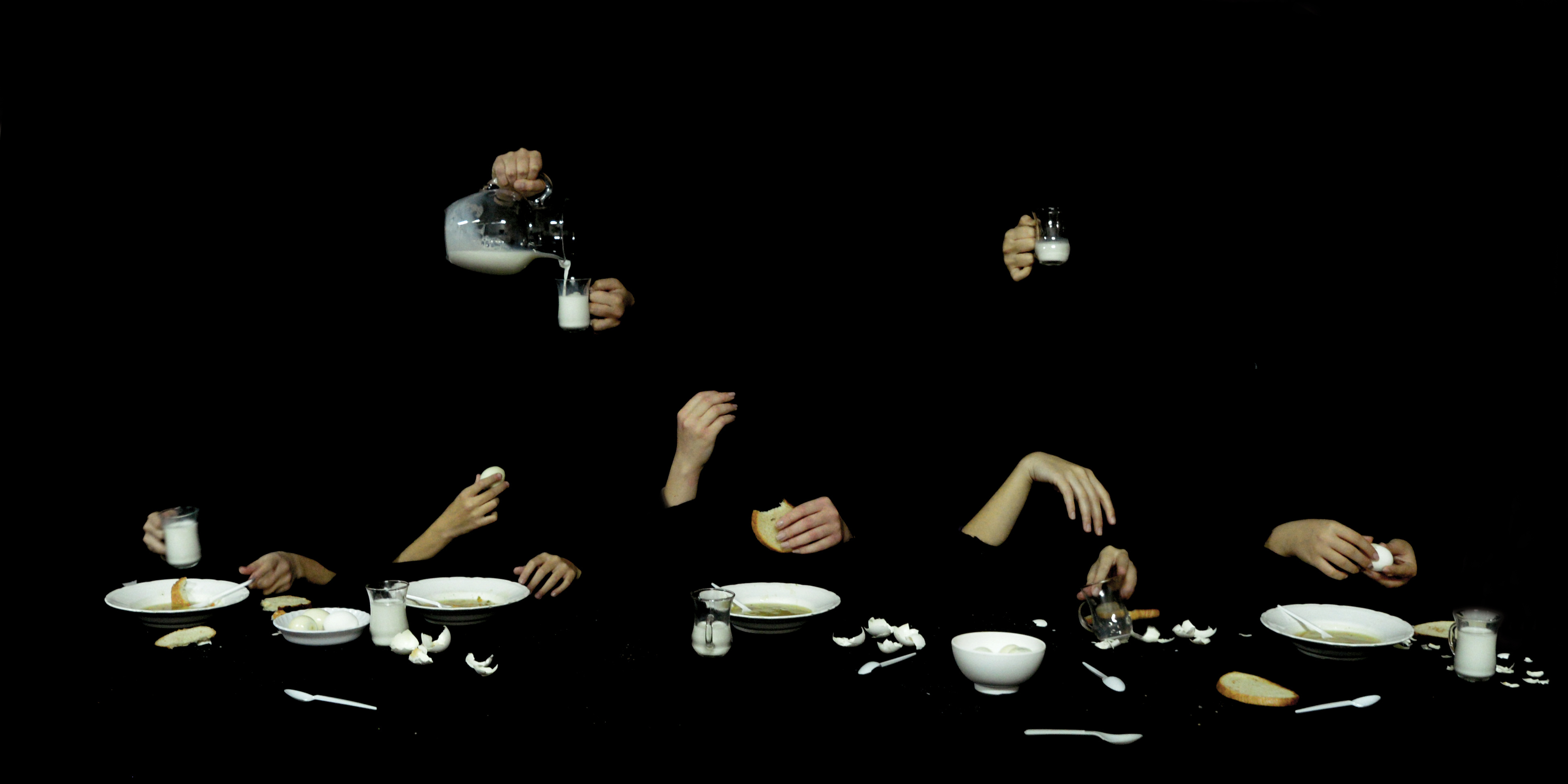
Seven Sisters, 2019

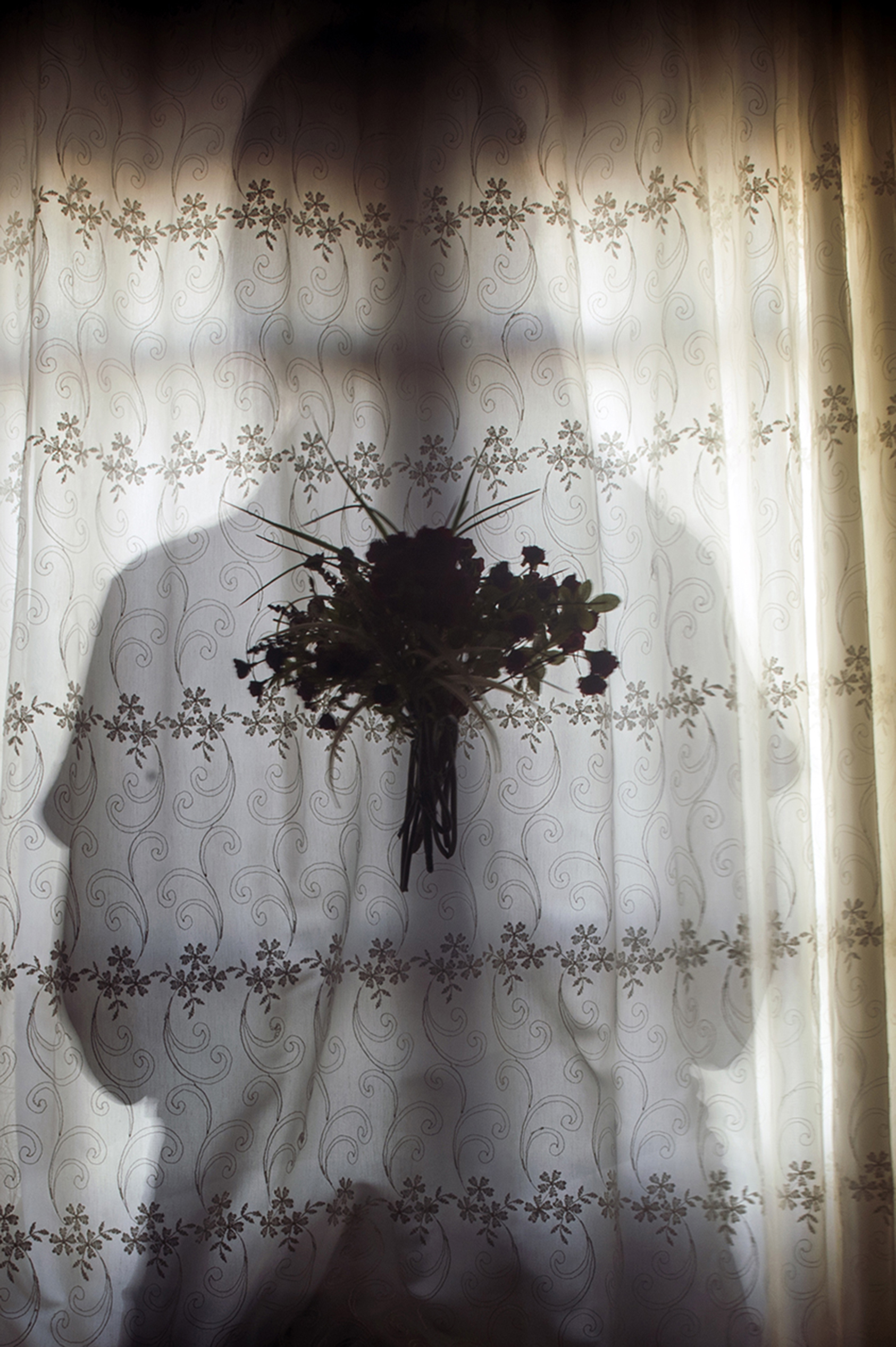
Untitled, 2020

Ziyan primarily engages in staged photography, with a particular focus on portraits of individuals and the creation of portraits through the arrangement of objects and the construction of environments devoid of human subjects. Her photographs frequently document women within contemporary Druze society. In her works, Ziyan explores themes related to socio-cultural identity within the Druze community and gender-related issues in her surrounding environment. Ziyan's work places a strong emphasis on questions that center around the concept of "culture" as an aesthetic category for examining and understanding the society in which she operates. The artistic and aesthetic realm provides an opportunity for reconciliation between nature and humanity, creating space for voices that are not given expression in other discursive spaces.

In her 2016 exhibition "Bare Concrete" at the Kabrie Gallery, Ziyan presented 12 photographs in various formats. In this carefully staged series, Ziyan explores themes of presence, absence, and deception, offering insight into her complex inner world. Air and concrete intertwine throughout the works, creating a tension that reflects her perspective. The figure of the father, who was a central and influential figure in Ziyan's life, serves as a recurring presence throughout the series, even when he is not directly depicted, such as in the work portraying a young girl against a concrete background. Concrete, in its various shades, appears as a recurring motif in the photographs and raises questions about permanence and impermanence, as well as memory and forgetting. These works further consider whether concrete is merely a thin and unstable surface or reinforced concrete constructed as a stable foundation.

In 2017, Ziyan presented a joint exhibition, "Huna and Hunak," with designer Rami Tareef at the Kabrie Gallery. In this exhibition, she isolated ordinary daily actions attributed to women, removed them from their context, and thus transformed them into a kind of encrypted ritual with an aura of sanctity and mystery.

In 2018, she presented a solo exhibition, "Crystal Palace," at the Umm al-Fahm Art Gallery. In this exhibition, Ziyan chose to focus on dialogues with Druze women, some of whom were close to her and others whom she had recently met. Ziyan asked questions and listened to the women's experiences in their youth and adulthood, in their lives as singles and as married women, as daughters, mothers, and partners. Her impressions led her to the visual image – to photography, through which she channels these things and realizes them in a unique photographic language. Both experientially and conceptually, the works illustrate the creative process itself, the transition from the spoken story to the image as a new, condensed, and poetic visual reality.

In 2021, Ziyan delved into the subject of reincarnation. Her exhibition "Beyond the Body," presented at the Wilfrid Israel Museum, was another step in Ziyan's artistic journey, with her photographs revealing hidden layers in her immediate surroundings. Staged photography allows her to control its components and create a hidden space of both presence and absence. The sense of illusion evoked by the image is evident from the very first photograph in the exhibition, which shows a transparent figure seeming to dissipate towards a closed gate, inviting the viewer to follow in its footsteps towards an unknown reality. The series of works dealt with the phenomenon of reincarnation, a deeply rooted belief prevalent in the Druze community, to which Ziyan belongs. The Arabic term for reincarnation, "Takamus," means changing clothes, and it expresses the attitude towards the human body as a temporary vessel for the soul, which is born again and again. Ziyan's photographs are based on stories of remembrance that she collected among members of the Druze community. Most of them had sought in their childhood to meet members of their families from a previous incarnation and had managed to identify them and locate significant personal objects in a place that was known only to them and their family members in previous lives.

== Exhibition ==
=== Selected solo exhibitions ===
- 2023 "Beyond", Tei-Hai Arts Institute, curators: curating: students for the curating course directed by Michal Shachnai
- 2023 "Prize exhibition", Gallery Fighters, Lohamei HaGeta'ot, curator: Michal Horvitz
- 2021 "To Know a Book", Tel Aviv University, Tel Aviv, curator: Shlomit Perry
- 2021 "Hidden", Amira Ziyan and Kobi Sibony, Kabri Gallery, Kibbutz Kabri, Israel, curator Avshalom Suliman (Dual Exhibitions)
- 2021 "A personal journey", State Comptroller Jerusalem, curator: Smadar Messing
- 2021 "Beyond the Body", Wilfrid Israel Museum, Kibbutz Hazorea, curator: Shir Meller- Yamagushi
- 2019 The Illuminated Beauty, Bar-Ilan University, Israel, curator, Leah Fish
- 2018 "Absence Parts", Ramot Menashe Art Gallery, curator: Miri Werner and Yonit Kadosh
- 2018 "Crystal Palace" Umm al-Fahm Art Gallery, Umm El Fahem, Israel, curator: Gilad Ofir
- 2017 "Houna ve Hounak", Amira Ziyan and Rami Tareef, Kabri Gallery, Kibbutz Kabri, Israel, curator: Anat Gatenio (Dual Exhibitions)
- 2016 "On Bare Concrete", Kabri Gallery, Kibbutz Kabri, Israel, curator: Avshalom Levi
- 2015 "To Know a Book", The Man in the Galilee Museum, Kibbutz Ginosar, Israel, curator: Nava Shoshani
- 2013 "The Fragments of the Image", Sudfa Gallery, Nazareth, Israel, curator: Manar Zoabi
- 2012 "New Photographs", Kabri Gallery, Kibbutz Kabri, Israel, curator: Sharon Poliakine

=== Group exhibitions ===
- 2024 "Victoria", Musrara Art Gallery, Jerusalem, curator: Ravit Harari
- 2024 "Art Up Nation" White Space Gallery, New York, curator: Keren Bar Gil
- 2023 " an instinct to change things", Trotter & Sholer Gallery New York, curator: Alexis Mendoza
- 2023 "Tastes of Heaven", Museum for Islamic Art, Jerusalem, curators: Dr. Limor Yugman, Adi Namia- Cohen
- 2022 "Blazing Sun" Artspace Tel-Aviv, gallery in Kiryat HaMelacha, curator:Shira Friedman
- 2022 "Through the mirror", Wilfrid Israel Museum, Kibbutz Hazorea, curator: Shir Meller- Yamagushi
- 2022 "Ras Al Khaima art festival 2022"- central exhibition Longing, be- longing, Dubai, curator: Sharon Toval
- 2022 "Ne/Aga", Museum on the Seam, Jerusalem, curator: Alon Razgour
- 2021 "The Mediterranean Biennale" 4, Haifa, curator: Blue-Simeon Feinero and Avital Bar-Shai
- 2021 "International Women's Day Exhibition" – Office of the President of the State of Israel
- 2020 "My Body is a Monument", The African Studies Gallery, curator: Idit Toledano
- 2020 "The Moon Reflection on the Asphalt, Studio of Her Own, Jerrusalem, curator: Natalie Peselev Stern.
- 2020 "Tresspassing", The Museum for Islamic Art, Jerusalem, curator: Dr. Sigal Barkay
- 2020 "Holiday Dinner", The Beit Henkin Art Gallery in Kfar Yehoshua, curator: Neta Haber
- 2019 "Winners Exhibition" The Ashdod Museum of Art, curator:Yuval Bitton, Roni Cohen-Binyamini and Dafna Gazit
- 2019 "Tar and milk", Herman Struck Museum, Haifa, Curator: Svetlana Reingold
- 2018 "Territories Unraveled", Artist House Jerusalem, curator: Irena Gordon
- 2017 "Art Without Borders", Circle 1, Berlin, Germany, curator: Shirley Meshulam
- 2017 "Feminist Sculpture in Istael", Mané-Katz, Haifa, Israel, curator: Svetlana Reingold
- 2017 "Art Without Borders", Transform! Europe, Vienna, Austria, curator: Shirley Meshulam
- 2016 "To Be More than a Rock", P8 Contemporary Art Gallery, Tel Aviv, Israel, curator: Sharon Tuval
- 2016 "Quest", The Open Museum of Photography, Tel Hai, Israel, curator: Roni Ben-Ari (traveling exhibition)
- 2016 "Textile – Territory – Text", Mana Contemporary, Jersey City, NJ, USA, curator: Irena Gordon
- 2014 "To Cross the Sea", Minshar Gallery, Tel Aviv, Israel, curator: Guy Raz
- 2013 "Museum Without Walls", Beit Hagefen Gallery, Haifa, curator: Yeala Hazut
- 2012 "Dialogue Encounter", Kabri Gallery, Kibbutz Kabri, Israel, curator: Drora Dekel

== Awards ==
- 2022 Oscar Handler Award from Kibbutz Lohamei HaGetaot
- 2020 Honorable Mention in the Becky Dekel Award from the Association for the Study of Women's Art and Gender
- 2017 The Israel Ministry of Culture Creativity Encouragement Award
- 2010 High Achievement in Final Project Award by the Friends of the University of Haifa
- 2009 The Shpilman Award for Photography Students, The Shpilman Institute, Tel Aviv
- 2008 The Saar Efroni Artist Prize, Israel
