= Rami Maymon =

Israeli artist

Rami Maymon רמי מימון
- Born: Tel Aviv, Israel
- Known for: photography, mixed media
- Movement: contemporary art
- Website: www.ramimaymon.com

Rami Maymon (Hebrew: רמי מימון) is an Israeli artist known for his diverse work in various media, including photography, video installations, and conceptual art. He studied at the Bezalel Academy of Arts and Design in Jerusalem, where he received his Bachelor of Fine Arts in 1999. Maymon later participated in Bezalel's Post Graduate Program of Art in Tel Aviv from 2001 to 2003.

His work has been featured in venues such as the Tel Aviv Museum of Art, the Norton Museum of Art in Florida, and the Museum of Contemporary Art Shanghai. Maymon's artistic practice often explores themes of identity, memory, and the intersection of personal and collective histories.

Notable solo exhibitions include "Living Room" at the Helena Rubinstein Pavilion of the Tel Aviv Museum of Art (2010), "The Pollinator" at the Bjcem-XII Biennial of Contemporary Art in Naples (2005), and "Further Reading" at the Tel Aviv Museum of Art (2015). Maymon has also contributed to group exhibitions at various institutions, including the Herzliya Museum of Contemporary Art, the Ein Harod Museum of Art, and the Umm al-Fahm Art Gallery.

== Biography ==
Rami Maymon studied in Bezalel Academy of Art and Design from 1995 till 1999. He received a Bachelor of Fine Arts in 1999. Maymon participated in Bezalel Post Graduate Program of Art in Tel Aviv from 2001 till 2003. Rami Maymon lives and works in Tel Aviv.

== Exhibitions ==
=== Solo ===
- 1999 "State of Emergency", Bezalel Academy, Jerusalem.
- 2002 "Back in a Minute", The Artists Studios Gallery, Tel Aviv.
- 2002 "Private Collection 1", Hamidrasha Gallery, Beit Berl.
- 2003 "Private Collection 2", The Post Graduate Program of Art, Bezalel Academy, Tel Aviv.
- 2004 "Home & Away", Tal Esther Gallery, Tel Aviv.
- 2005 "The Pollinator", Bjcem-XII Biennial of Contemporary Art, Naples, Italy.
- 2007 "The Diver & The Bee", Noga Gallery of Art, Tel Aviv.
- 2008 "Sunset", Installation at the IltisBunker, Kiel, Germany.
- 2010 "Living Room", Helena Rubinstein Pavilion, Tel Aviv Museum of Art.
- 2011 "White Night", Hinterhof space, Basel, Switzerland.
- 2012 "Untitled (Dora Maar)", A Video installation at Shpilman Institute, The 2nd International Photography Festival, Jaffa.
- 2013 "Further Reading", The Photography Gallery, Hamidrasha School of Art.
- 2014 "Rudin Prize" Norton Museum of Art, West Palm Beach, Florida.
- 2014 “Merhav” video installation at Hezi Cohen Gallery.
- 2014 "Nystagmus" project, Munich Volkstheater, Germany.
- 2015 "Further Reading", Tel Aviv Museum of Art.
- 2015 "Phonetic Transcription", Hezi Cohen Gallery, Tel Aviv.

=== Group ===
Rami Maymon participated in group exhibitions around the world, including Museum of Contemporary Art Shanghai, Herzliya Museum of Contemporary Art, Ein Harod Museum of Art, Ashdod Museum of Art, Beit-HaGefen Arab Jewish Culture Center, Nahum Gutman Museum of Art, International Photography Festival (Israel), the photography gallery at Bezalel Academy of Arts and Design, Israeli National Maritime Museum, Umm al-Fahm Art Gallery. One of the exhibitions, he participated was a controversial group show at the ancient Roman place in the Old City of Jerusalem, aiming to bring art to this part of the city.

== Awards ==
- 2014 'Rudin Prize for Emerging Photography'. Norton Museum of Art.
- 2015 Israeli Ministry of Science and Culture Prize for excellence in photography.
