= Sagit Zluf Namir =

Israeli photographer and educator (born 1978)

Sagit Zluf Namir שגית זלוף נמיר
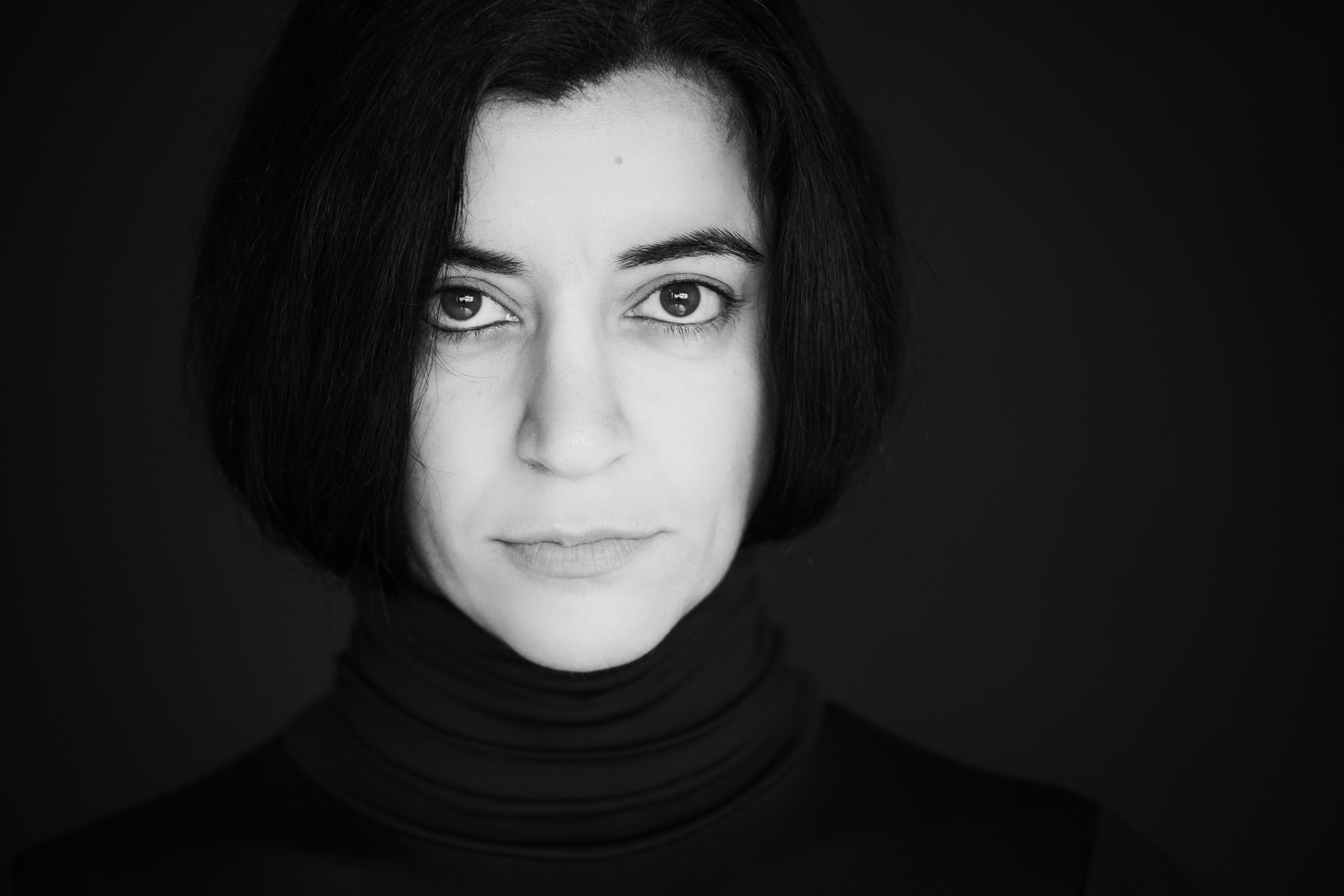
- Zluf Namir in 2019
- Born: 1978 (age 47–48); Israel
- Education: WIZO Haifa Academy of Design and Education, Tel Aviv University
- Known for: Photography
- Movement: Israeli art, Modern Art
- Website: www.sagitzn.com

Sagit Zluf Namir (Hebrew: שגית זלוף נמיר; born 1978) is an Israeli photographer and educator.

== Biography ==
Namir was born in 1978 in Kiriat Bialik. She is known for her non-standard representation of still life objects. She takes real life objects from their context and re-creates them as vulnerable personal images. Her photography is minimalistic with a delicate game of nuances. Namir graduated from WIZO Haifa Academy of Design and Education with a BFA. She teaches photography classes in WIZO Haifa Academy of Design and Education, Minshar School of Arts and Gavra School of Photography in Tel Aviv. Namir was teaching photography workshops in Herzliya Museum of Contemporary Art from 2007 to 2009. She has served as one of the judges of the Local Testimony exhibition and award from 2016. Zluf Namir's artistic style is highly academical and not commercial.

Namir's works are part of the public collection of Haifa Museum of Art.

== Exhibitions ==
=== Solo ===
- 2005 "Every angel is terrible". Artists House. Jerusalem
- 2006. "Photographs from the Nidbach series". Artists House. Jerusalem.
- 2008. "Chinco". D&A Gallery. Tel Aviv.
- 2009 "Clean&Cold/Photography". "Kayma" Gallery. Jaffa
- 2011 "Fraction". "Indie" Photography Gallery. Tel Aviv
- 2012 "In Vitro". "Indie" Photography Gallery. Tel Aviv
- 2013 "In Vitro". "Indie" Photography Gallery. Tel Aviv
- 2015 "Natural Choice". WIZO Haifa Academy of Design and Education Main Gallery.
- 2019 "Hajibada". Minshar Gallery of Art. Curated by Irena Gordon.
- 2024 "Memorabilia". With Reut Asimini. Gallery 51 MOdi'in. Curated by Nitza Peri.

=== Group ===
- 2008. "Dead End". Rosenfeld Gallery. Tel Aviv
- 2010. "To dream reality". Pyramida Center for Contemporary Art. Curated by Shirley Meshulam.
- 2015. "Vulnerability". ArtSpace Gallery. Tel Aviv.
- 2016. "Vacuum Photographers". Tel Aviv International Photography Festival.
- 2016. "White on white". Haifa Museum of Art.
- 2017. "Fresh Paint" contemporary art fair. The Steinhardt Museum of Natural History. Tel Aviv
- 2017 "If Helios had decided to tilt the sun". "The photography lab" gallery, Curated by Assaf Gam Hacohen. Tel Aviv
- 2018 "Big Eyes". Gallery on the Cliff. Netanya.

=== Curatorship ===
- 2011. "Curriculum Vitae" by Mark Yashaev. Artists House. Jerusalem
- 2012. "Death of an Agent" by Assaf Gam HaCohen. Indie Gallery. Tel Aviv
- 2015. "The Edge" Group Exhibition. Hangar 2 Gallery, Jaffa Port.
- 2016. "Lucid" Group Exhibition. Hangar 2 Gallery, Jaffa Port.
- 2017. "On the verge" Group Exhibition. Hangar 2 Gallery. Jaffa Port.
- 2017. "Frozen Moments" by Renana Ben-Ari. Jaffa Museum.
- 2019 "Standart Deviation". Group Exhibition. Photo:Israel 2019, Tel Aviv.
- 2019-2020 "Infected Bodies". Group Exhibition. Haifa Museum of Art.
- 2020 "Membrane". Debbie Morag, Solo Exhibition. Photo is:rael 2020
- 2020 "The Swimmer". Shunit Falko Zaritzky. Photo Is:rael 2020. Tel Aviv

== Awards ==
- 2003 Rotary Israel scholarship.
- 2004-2006 grant of AICF, American-Israel cultural foundation.
- 2016 Bronze prize in Fine Art / Still Life category. Tokyo International Foto Awards.
- 2019 commendation from the Association for Women's Art and Gender Research in Israel.
