= Angelika Sher =

Lithuanian-born Israeli photographer (born 1969)

Angelika Sher אנג'ליקה שר
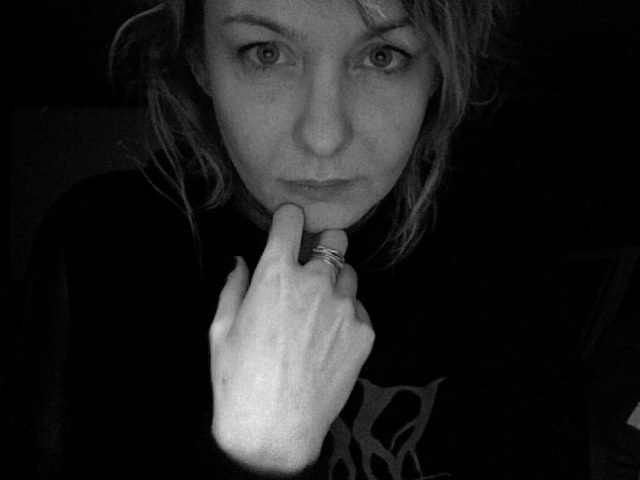
- Born: Vilnius, Lithuanian SSR, Soviet Union
- Education: Bar-Ilan University, the College of Photography in Kiryat Ono, the Bezalel Academy of Art and Design
- Known for: photography
- Movement: Israeli art, Fine Art

Angelika Sher (Hebrew: אנג'ליקה שר; born 1969) is a Lithuanian-born Israeli photographer.

== Biography ==
Angelika Sher was born in Vilnius, Lithuania. She immigrated to Israel in 1990. She has earned a BA degree in radiography and natural science from Bar-Ilan University, where she has studied from 1991 to 1995. In 2002–2005 Sher studied at the College of Photography in Kiryat Ono, followed by a two-year program at Bezalel Academy of Art and Design in Jerusalem (2007–2008). Angelika Sher is married to Vladimir Lumberg, a musician and a producer of the music band "Jewrhythmics", and a mother of three. She lives and works in Israel.

== Art career ==
Soon after graduation from the College of Photography in Kiryat Ono, where she met Pesi Girsch, her teacher and mentor, Sher had her first solo exhibition at the Ramat Gan Museum. Sher has exhibited her photography in Israel, Italy and Denmark, at the Moscow Biennale, and in Czech Republic. A solo exhibition of her work opened in New York in January 2015. Sher also participated in Animanix Biennale and International Photography Festival in Tel Aviv. She won the 2009 Sony World Photography Awards, Professional, 3rd Place: Fine Art—Conceptual and Constructed. Sher also engaged in photography projects with the Gesher Theater and mentally-challenged people at Beit Issie Shapiro.

In October 2010 a photograph from her series "Growing Down" was sold by the Philips De Pury auction house in a New York Photography auction.

In 2014 Kehrer Verlag published a book of her work "Angelika Sher – Series, 2005–2012".

== Solo exhibitions ==
- 2007 "My Mother's Fur Coat", Ramat Gan Museum, Israel
- 2009 "Inside my Life", Reartuno gallery, Brescia, Italy
- 2009 "Inside my Life", Reartuno gallery, Brescia, Italy
- 2009 "13", Pobeda gallery, Moscow, as part of 3d Moscow Biennale of Contemporary Art
- 2009 "Twilight Sleep", Fotografiya gallery, Ljubljana, Slovenia
- 2009 "13", Tavi Dresdner Gallery, Tel Aviv, Israel
- 2010 "Twilight Sleep", Tavi Dresdner gallery, Tel Aviv, Israel
- 2011 "Survival", solo show as part of Tina B Biennale at Galerie Vernon, Prague
- 2012 "Twilight Sleep", Camera 16, Milan
- 2012 "History of the Beauty", Zemack gallery, Tel Aviv
- 2014 "Fifth Column". Zemack Gallery, Tel Aviv
- 2015 "Disturbing Beauty". Sepia EYE Gallery, New York City
- 2017 "Swan Song" ( dual), Gallery 4, Tel Aviv, Israel
- 2017 "Tel Aviv – Odessa" (dual), Eretz Israel Museum, Tel Aviv, Israel
- 2018 "The Song of Deborah", Zemack Gallery, Tel Aviv, Israel
- 2019 "A Green Oak Grows in the Bay", Beeri Gallery, Israel
- 2019 "Selected Series", The Laurie M.Tisch Gallery, New York
- 2021 ”Egle The Queen of Serpents", Jewish Museum of Vilna Gaon, Vilnius, Lithuania
- 2022 "By the Window", Zemack Contemporary Art, Tel-Aviv

== Selected group exhibitions ==
- 2007 "Environment Love", New Gallery Jerusalem, Israel
- 2008 "Presence of the Sea", Cinema Center, Tel Aviv, Israel
- 2008 "Dirty White", Contemporary Art Space gallery, Tel Aviv,
- 2008 "Growing Down", Presentation of new series, Bezalel Academy of Arts and Design, Jerusalem, Israel
- 2008 "Awakening the tiger", Contemporary Art Space Gallery, Tel Aviv, Israel
- 2008 "Everything is Dynamic", Tiroche Gallery, Yafo, Israel
- 2008 "Goim", New Gallery, Jerusalem, Israel
- 2009 Animanix Biennale 2009–2010 Venues: Museum of Contemporary Art, Shanghai, Taipei and Kaohsiung, Today Art Museum, Beijing.
- 2009 1st Israeli Festival of Photography, Tel Aviv, Israel
- 2009 StArt exhibition, Tel Aviv, Israel
- 2009 "The Intimate Line", Sepia EYE Gallery, New York
- 2010 "Moments of Home", special project with mentally challenged people, Tel Aviv port, Israel
- 2010 "Survival", Tavi Dresdner Gallery, Tel Aviv, Israel
- 2009 2010 Sony WPA World tour: Hong Kong, Tokyo, Toronto, Paris, New York, Bangkok, Mexico City, London, Berlin, Kuala Lumpur
- 2010 Haifa International Mediterranean Biennale of Contemporary Art
- 2011 "Photopoetica", Musrara School of Photography (Naggar School of Photography), Jerusalem
- 2011 "Toys", Tel Aviv port
- 2011 French Cultural Center, Haifa
- 2011 "Safe place", Municipal Art Gallery of Rishon LeZion
- 2011 Artists' House, Tel Aviv
- 2011 Ramat Gan Museum Israel
- 2011 "The Coming Community", Haifa Museum of Art
- 2012 "What is real?", ME Contemporary Art, Copenhagen, Denmark
- 2013 2nd Mediterranean Biannale of Contemporary Art, Sahnin, Israel
- 2014 3d International Photography Festival (Israel), Rishon LeZion, Israel
- 2015 "Hiwar", The Arab Museum of Contemporary Art, Sahnin, Israel
- 2017 3nd Mediterranean Biannale of Contemporary Art, Sahnin, Israel
- 2017 "Odessa – Tel Aviv". International Photography Festival (Israel), Tel Aviv, Israel.
- 2018 "Face off", Sepia EYE gallery, NY
- 2020 "Female foreignness", Haifa Museum
- 2021 "Living together-crossing borders", 4th Mediterranean Biennale, Haifa
- 2022 ”One of a Kinds", Tel Aviv Museum of Art, Israel

== See also ==
- Visual arts in Israel
