= Mark Yashaev =

Israeli photographer (born 1981)

- Born: 1981 (age 44–45); Baku, Azerbaijan
- Education: WIZO Haifa Academy of Design and Education, Bezalel Academy of Arts and Design
- Known for: Photography,
- Movement: Israeli art, Modern Art

Mark Yashaev (Hebrew: מארק יאשאייב) is an Israeli photographer.

== Biography ==
Mark Yashaev was born in Azerbaijan. At the age of nine, he immigrated to Israel with his family. He studied in the photography department and received his BEd from the WIZO Haifa Academy of Design and Education. He completed an MFA at the Bezalel Academy of Arts and Design in 2013.

Yashaev's initial photography work documents the daily life of his immigrant family through a series of portraits, notable for their intimacy. In his later work, he began mounting photographs in sculptural installations that also included ready-made objects and the exhibition space itself. His works are in public and private collections around the world, including the Tel Aviv Museum of Art permanent collection.

== Exhibitions ==
=== Solo ===
- 2016."Only from this suddenness and on". Curated by Raz Samira. Tel Aviv Museum of Art.
- 2015 "Even a black hole ends its life", WIZO Haifa Academy of Design and Education Gallery.
- 2012 "Memorandum of Understanding", Ramat Gan Museum of Israeli Art, Israel
- 2011 "Curriculum Vita", Curated by Sagit Zaloof Namir Jerusalem Artists House, Israel.

=== Group ===
- 2012 "Paris Square", Haifa Museum of Art, Israel
- 2014 "Measure for Measure", Petah Tikva Museum of Art, Israel
- 2015 "The Potential of the unconscious", Mact/Cact, Bellinzona, Switzerland

== Awards ==
In 2015, Yashaev was awarded the Lauren and Mitchell Presser Photography Award for a Young Israeli Artist.
