= Arab Museum of Contemporary Art and Heritage =

Contemporary Art Museum in Israel

Coordinates: 32.8646°N 35.2948°E

The Arab Museum of Contemporary Art and Heritage
- Established: 2015
- Location: Dohaa st. 100, Sakhnin, Israel
- Type: Art
- Director: Belu-Simion Fainaru

The Arab Museum of Contemporary Art and Heritage (AMOCAH or AMOCA) is a Contemporary Art Museum in Arab city Sakhnin in Israel.

== History ==
The Arab Museum of Contemporary Art and Heritage is the first Arab museum of contemporary art established in Israel. It was founded by two Israeli artists Belu-Simion Fainaru and Avital Bar-Shay. After curating several Mediterranean Biennales they decided that exhibiting Arab, Jewish and Mediterranean artists together in one museum was a worthy endeavor. The museum was inaugurated in June 2015 by Sakhnin Mayor Mazen Gnaim and President's Reuven Rivlin wife Nechamia Rivlin. It was decided that the museum would continue to host the Mediterranean Biennale as part of its program. Until it was officially recognized by the Israeli Ministry of Culture it operated as a private museum.

Sayid Abu Shaqra, the owner of Umm al-Fahm Art Gallery was disappointed that AMOCA was declared the first modern Arab art museum in Israel. The plan was to turn his gallery into a modern art museum, but at the time, funding issues stood in the way. The Ummal-Fahm gallery was finally recognized as a museum in July 2024.

== Collection and exhibitions ==
Museum's opening exhibition was called "Hiwar" which means "dialogue" in Arabic. The exhibition included the works of Adel Abdessemed, Marina Abramović, Larry Abramson, Asad Azi, Raed Bawayah, Matei Bejenaru, Bashir Borlakov, Daniel Buren, Thorsten Brinkmann, Barbara Eichhorn, Mounir Fatmi, Belu-Simion Fainaru, Mekhitar Garabedian, Jeanno Gaussi, Moshe Gershuni, Maïmouna Patrizia Guerresi, Rawan Ismail, Nidal Jabarin, Huda Jamal, Muhammad Said Kallash, Dani Karavan, Jannis Kounellis, Mehdi-Georges Lahlou, Almagul Menlibayeva, Bohtaina Abu Milhem, Shirin Neshat, Herman Nitsch, Zohdy Qadry, Anahita Razmi, Valentin Ruhry, Angelika Sher, Eva Shlegel, Cengiz Tekin, Jesica Vaturi, Maria Vedder, Johannes Vogl, Micha Ullman, David Wakstain and Runi Zaraw. In 2015, the museum had a permanent collection of 200 works of art.
