= Ladi'Sasha Jones =

Ladi'Sasha Jones is a writer and curator from Harlem. Currently, she is the Sophie Davis Curatorial Fellow for Gender and Racial Parity at the Norton Museum of Art. "She held prior appointments at the New Museum’s IdeasCity platform and NYPL’s Schomburg Center for Research in Black Culture." "She approaches her documentation practice by working from the intersections of cultural equity, art and collective work." She holds a B.A. in African American Studies at Temple University and a M.A. in Arts Politics from the NYU Tisch School of Arts.

== Career ==
Since September 2018, Ladi'Sasha Jones has been an artist engagement manager at The Laundromat Project.. She has dedicated herself to the project and it mission. Along with the Laundromat Project, Jones is a founder of the I, Too, Arts Collective, which is group of individuals whose mission is to create a residency on the basis of American Poet James Mercer Langston.
