= Central Gallery (Tel Aviv) =

Central Gallery for Contemporary Art
- Established: 2012
- Location: Tel Aviv Central Bus Station
- Type: Art gallery, Contemporary art gallery
- Directors: Doron Furman (2012 - 2020), currently vacant.

Central Gallery is a public, not-for-profit art gallery and exhibition space in Tel Aviv, Israel, located in Tel Aviv Central Bus Station

== History ==
The gallery was established in Tel Aviv Central Bus Station as part of the broad project to attract artists to dilapidated station building in addition to other artistic project, like "Karov" theatre, Performance art platform and Yung Yiddish foundation. The gallery usually shows non commercial projects, discussing issues of local culture and their connection with contemporary art world.

The gallery is located on second floor of the Tel Aviv Central Bus Station and consists of huge exhibition hall and video art space.

The gallery holds several solo and group exhibitions per year.

=== Notable exhibitions ===
- 2012 "Face of a country. Curated by Orit Galili.
- 2013 "The Labyrinth", the exhibitions about Ram Carmi Central bus station project and its outcome that led to the building and surroundings decay.
- 2013 "Breached Zone", Curated by Doron Furman.
- 2015 "Topsy Turvy". Curated by Doron Furman.
- 2015 "Traces of the Real". Curated by Doron Furman.
- 2016 "Gentle fragrance". Inbal Marie Cohen and Liron Tor-Caspa.
- 2016 "Do not touch me with anxiety". Asaf Rolef Ben-Shahar and Lilac Abramsky-Arazi.
- 2017 "Abject Art". Curated by Doron Furman.
- 2017 "Disgust and revulsion". Curated by Yehuda Rahaniev.
- 2017 "Nonplace: dance and movement". Curated by Igor Zeiger.
- 2018 "Drawing". Solo by Hanna Ashuri.
- 2019 "Facade". Curated by Doron Furman.
- 2021 "Either Way". Curated by Curated by Olga Yerushalmi and Ksenia Nazarov.

== See also ==
- Visual arts in Israel
