= Mazen Ghnaim =

Israeli Arab politician

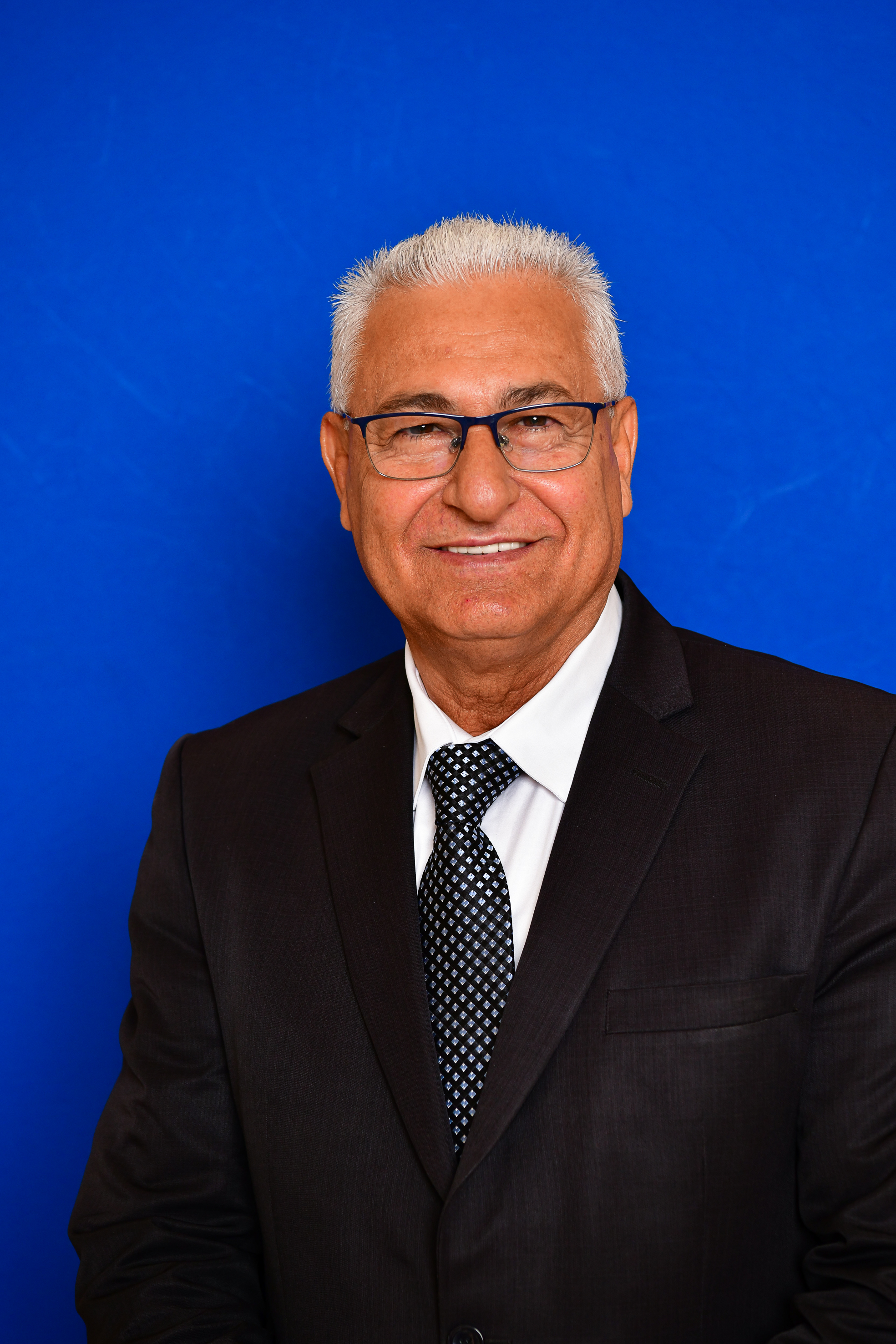
- Ghnaim in 2022

Faction represented in the Knesset
- 2021–2022: United Arab List

Personal details
- Born: 30 November 1956 (age 69) Sakhnin, Israel

Mazen Ghnaim (Arabic: مازن غنايم, Hebrew: מָאזֶן גְּנָאִים; born 30 November 1956) is an Israeli Arab politician who has served as mayor of Sakhnin since 2024. He was previously the city's mayor from 2008 to 2018, and a member of the Knesset for the United Arab List from 2021 to 2022. Ghnaim also served as chairman of Bnei Sakhnin football club.

== Biography ==
Ghnaim was born in Sakhnin. He played for Hapoel Sakhnin football club until the age of 27. After the club merged with Maccabi Sakhnin to form Bnei Sakhnin, he became the new club's chairman. A member of Balad, Ghnaim was eighth on the party's list for the 2006 Knesset elections, but the party won only three seats. In 2008 he resigned as chairman of the football club in order to run for the mayoralty of Sakhnin in the local elections. He was elected with 59% of the vote and remained mayor until the 2018 elections.

Ghnaim was placed sixth on the United Arab List–Balad list for the April 2019 Knesset elections, but the alliance won only four seats. He was given the third slot on the Balad list for the September 2019 elections, but after the party became part of the Joint List and he placed thirteenth on its list, he opted not to run. He subsequently negotiated with Meretz to join their list for the 2020 elections, but was not included in the joint Meretz–Labor–Gesher list. Prior to the 2021 elections he was placed second on the list of the United Arab List, and was elected to the Knesset as the party won four seats. Ghnaim did not seek re-election in 2022, and was elected to another term as mayor of Sakhnin in 2024.
