= Eyal Landesman =

Israeli artist and social activist

Eyal Landesman אֵיַאל לַנְדְסְמַן
- Born: 1970 (age 55–56); Haifa, Israel
- Known for: Photography, Motion Art
- Awards: Local Testimony. First Prize in Art and Culture category

Eyal Landesman (Hebrew: אֵיַאל לַנְדְסְמַן) is an Israeli artist and social activist, known for being co-founder and artistic director of International Photography Festival as well as founder and director of a non-profit organization PHOTO IS:RAEL.

== Biography ==
Eyal Landesman was born in Haifa in the 1970. He graduated from Wizo School of Art and Design in Haifa, where he studied graphic design.

=== Career ===
His was a photographer for video clip "Her Morning Elegance", directed by Oren Lavie, which was nominated for the Grammy award in 2010. The clip was also screened at Cannes Lions International Festival of Creativity, Los Angeles Film Festival, Contemporary Film Festival at the Pompidou Centre and SXSW. In 2006 archive of Landesman works had been purchased by Harvard University. Landesman was one of the judges in British Council competition "EnGENDERed" and "Fresh Paint" art festival in 2017. In 2018 Landesman was chosen as one of the experts for portfolio review at Rencontres d'Arles and Athens Photo Festival. Landesman became nominator for the international Prix Pictet in 2016.

Landesman is known for being drawn to the exploration of the borders between imagination, illusion and documentary work through photography. Throughout his career, he has investigated these borders via diverse technological and cultural platforms, beginning with theatre, both out front and behind the scenes. Later, he expanded his interest in search of the borders of conventional photography both in time and space in images created with the use of diverse technologies and presentation forms. These include zooming and projection of the captured image, using public or darkened spaces or using stop motion technology.

== Exhibitions ==
Eyal Landesman participated in group and solo exhibitions around the world and in Israel.

=== Solo ===
- 2001. Tmuna Theater. "Make me a photo of an artist".
- 2006. Suzanne Dellal Center for Dance and Theater. "Portrait of a Creator in Motion"
- 2008. Acco Festival of Alternative Israeli Theatre. "Acco-Avignon - 15 Minutes".
- 2009. Festival d'Avignon. "Acco-Avignon - 15 Minutes".

=== Group ===
- 2011. Local Testimony, Tel Aviv.

== Curatorship ==
- 2008 "The Israel Trail" Mane Katz Gallery. Tel Aviv
- 2016 "Broken Dreams" by Antonin Kratochvil. Tel Aviv.
- 2017 "Broken Countries" by Paolo Pellegrin. International Photography Festival, Tel Aviv.
- 2022 "Call for Action", in collaboration with Ya’ara Raz Haklai. Photo:Israel 2022, Tel Aviv.

== Awards ==
- 2004. Local Testimony. First Prize in Art and Culture category.
- 2008. Momentum. Images of Dance International Photography Prize. Connecticut

== Collections ==
Eyal Landesman works are in permanent collection of Harvard University library.
