= Gavra Mandil =

Israeli photographer

Gavra Mandil גברא מנדיל
- Born: 1936; Kingdom of Yugoslavia
- Died: 2006 (aged 69–70)
- Known for: photography

Gavra Mandil (Hebrew: גברא מנדיל; 1936–2006) was a Yugoslavian born Israeli photographer and educator. He was one of the first photographers of advertising and fashion in Israel, the chairman of the Photographers Association, a photography teacher, and the founder of the Studio Gavra School of Photography.

== Biography ==
Gavra Mandil was born in 1936 in Belgrade. His mother's father Gavra Confino was the court photographer of the king of Yugoslavia; his father, Moshe, was a well-known photographer with a photography studio in Novi Sad, where the family moved.

With the beginning of the Nazi occupation, the family was evacuated from Yugoslavia, when the family's photographic talent and daring saved them time after time from death. After many incarnations, the family fled to Albania, where they were hidden until the end of the war by Refik Veseli, one of the father's assistants, at his parents' home in the mountains. For this he and his family won the title of Righteous Among the Nations.

After the war the Mandil family returned to Yugoslavia, and in 1949 immigrated to Israel. The family settled in Haifa, where Moshe opened Talpiot. In spite of the difficulties of absorption in Israel, Gever quickly became involved with his peers, joined the Scout movement, guided it, and joined the Nahal Brigade, like his other comrades, participated in the Sinai War and returned to Kibbutz Katzir.

Although he did not plan to continue his family tradition in photography, he found himself caught up by the new developments in the world of photography abroad, completing his bachelor's degree in England and passing the rigorous examinations of the Association of Professional Photographers. Who graduated from photography schools from all over England, and worked for the best photographers in London and acquired a lot of experience during his visit to Israel, where he married Naomi, his former student, and the couple returned to England and stayed there until the end of their studies and work.

Gavra returned to Israel in 1962 and opened the Gavra Studio for commercial, fashion and industrial photography at 24 Avoda Street in Tel Aviv. Almost all the other photographers were photo photographers, like his father, who took pictures of everything - events, weddings, advertisements, and fashion photography. Gavra created the demand for professional and high-quality photographs, as was seen at the time in foreign magazines, and was a full partner in setting the concept, styling, casting and choosing the photography sites, El-Al, the government offices, the big banks, Mifal Hapayis, Amcor, Tadiran, etc. He photographed the beauty and celebrity queens of the 1960s and 1970s to my hair for women and the singers and bands of Hed Arzi's record labels. Leitersdorf in Maskit, Gideon Oberson, Gottex, Diva and Ata. In 1969 he founded the Israeli Association of Photographers and Industry. In 1979 he joined the Association of Professional Photographers and in 1985 was elected president.

Gavra died in February 2006, in the midst of work on his second book, which was supposed to be a reference book for photography combined with examples and personal stories.

=== Studio Gavra School of Photography ===
Since 1974, Gavra Mandil began teaching at the high schools of photography - Bezalel Academy, Hadassah Academic College and Ono Academic College. He transformed his studio on 24 Ha'avoda Street to a photography school based on a model he had learned in the United States. The Gavra Studio continues to operate as a unique school of professional photography under the management of the Gavra's children, Ruti Mandil-Halabi and Ron Mandil.
