= Sakhnin =

City in Israel's Northern District

Sakhnin: סַחְ'נִין, סִכְנִין; سخنين
- City (from 1995)

Hebrew transcription(s)
  - ISO 259: Saḥnin, Saknin (Israeli pronunciation)
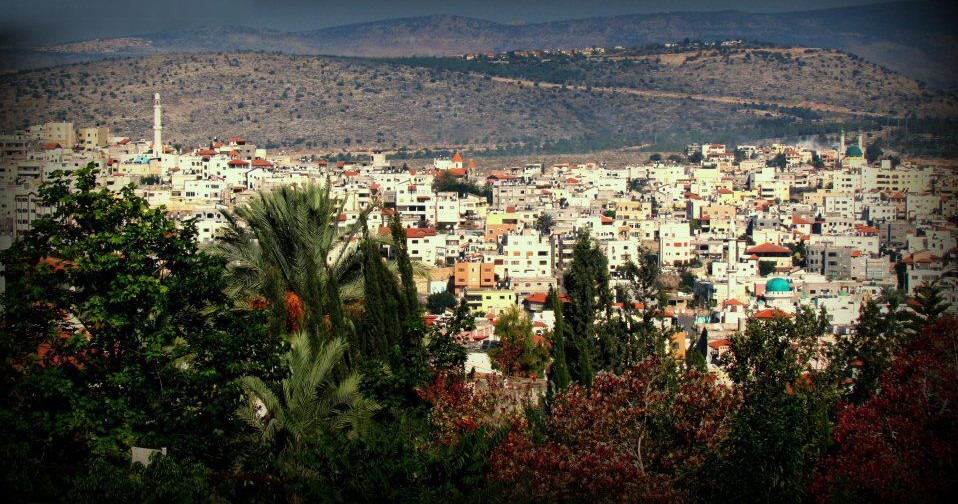
- View of Sakhnin

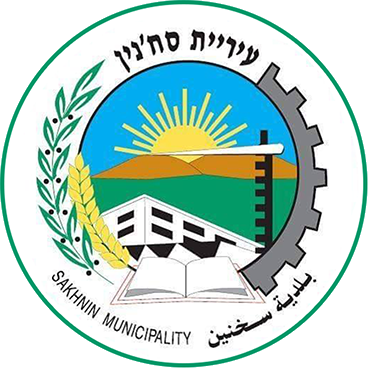
- Emblem of Sakhnin

- Location within Northwest Israel Location within Israel
- Coordinates: 32°52′N 35°18′E
- Grid position: 177/252 PAL
- Country: Israel
- District: Northern
- Subdistrict: Acre
- Natural Region: Shefar'am
- Founded: 1500 BCE (as Sagone); 1995 (Israeli city)

Government
  - Mayor: Mazen Ghnaim

Area
  - Total: 9,816 dunams (9.816 km^{2}; 3.790 sq mi)

Population (2024)
  - Total: 33,728
  - Density: 3,436/km^{2} (8,899/sq mi)
- Name meaning: Sukhnin, from personal name,

Sakhnin (Arabic: سخنين; Hebrew: סַחְנִין or סִכְנִין Sikhnin) is a city in Israel's Northern District. It is located in the Lower Galilee, about 23 kilometres (14 mi) east of Acre. Sakhnin was declared a city in 1995. In 2024 its population was 33,728; 95% of the population was Muslim and 5% was Christian.

== Geography ==
Sakhnin is built over three hills and is located in a valley surrounded by the Mount Carmel range, the highest mountain 602 metres (1,975 ft) high. Its rural landscape is almost entirely covered by olive and fig groves as well as oregano and sesame shrubs.

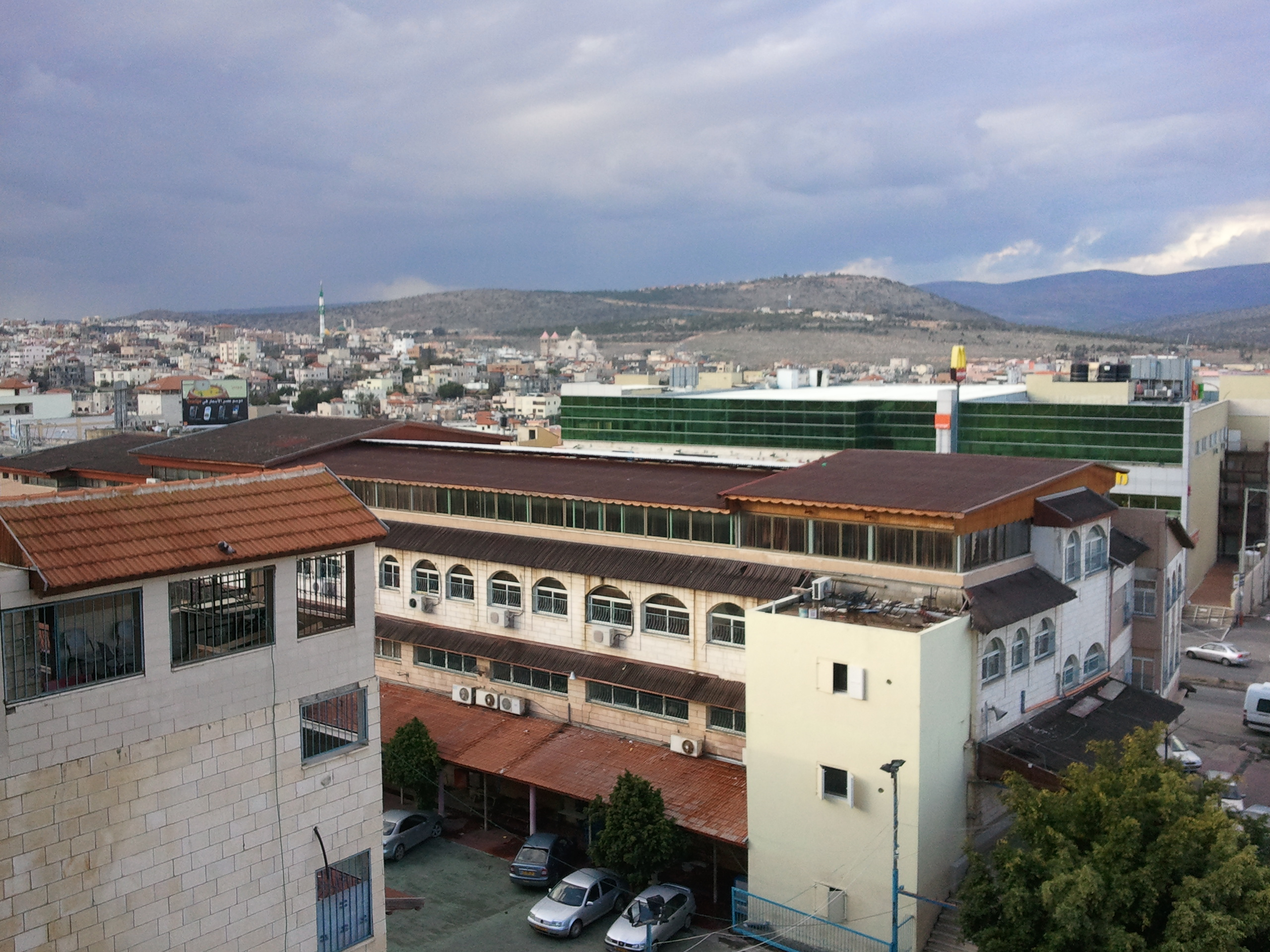
College of Sakhnin for Teacher Education

== History ==
Settlement at Sakhnin dates back 3,500 years to its first mention in 1479 BCE by Thutmose II, whose ancient Egyptian records mention it as a centre for production of indigo dye.

Sakhnin is situated on an ancient site, where remains from columns and cisterns have been found. It was mentioned as Sogane, a town fortified in 66, by Josephus. A cistern, excavated near the mosque in the old city centre, revealed pottery fragments dating from the 1st to the 5th century CE.

Haninah ben Teradion, who was arrested by the Roman authorities for heresy (minut), is said to have run a Torah academy there. It may be the village Kfar Sikhnin referred to in rabbinical accounts of the aftermath of the trial of Rabbi Eliezer ben Hyrcanus for heresy.

In 1961 Bellarmino Bagatti, during a visit to the village, was shown a tomb venerated by Christians, Jews and Muslims, which local tradition identified as that of James the Just. On returning to the village, he discovered that restoration had been undertaken and the site renamed the burial place of Rabbi Yehoshua of Sakhnin. Richard Bauckham has raised the possibility that the Yaakov of Sikhnin in accounts of rabbi Eliezer may be James the grandson of Jude.

In the Crusader era, it was known as Zecanin. In 1174 it was one of the casalia (villages) given to Phillipe le Rous. In 1236 descendants of Phillipe le Rous confirmed the sale of the fief of Saknin.

=== Ottoman era ===
In 1596, Sakhnin appeared in Ottoman tax registers as being in the nahiya (subdistrict) of Akka (Acre), part of Safad Sanjak. It had a population of 66 households and 8 bachelors, all Muslim. The villagers paid a fixed tax rate of 20% on various agricultural products, including wheat, barley, olives, cotton, in addition to a water mill; a total of 12,138 akçe.

In 1838, Sakhnin was noted as a Muslim and Christian village in the Shaghur district, located between Safad, Acre and Tiberias. In 1859 the British Consul Rogers estimated the population to be 1,100, and the cultivated area 100 feddans, while in 1875 Victor Guérin found 700 inhabitants, both Muslims and Greek Orthodox Christians.

In 1881, the PEF's Survey of Western Palestine (SWP) described Sakhnin as follows: "A large village of stone and mud, amid fine olive-groves, with a small mosque. The water supply is from a large pool about half a mile to the south-east. The inhabitants are Moslems and Christians". A population list from about 1887 showed that Sakhnin had about 1,915 inhabitants; 1,640 Muslims, 150 Catholic Christians and 125 Greek Christians.

=== British Mandate era ===
In the 1922 census of Palestine conducted by the British Mandate authorities, Sakhnin had a population of 1,575; 1,367 Muslims and 208 Christians; 87 Orthodox and 121 Greek Catholic (Melchite). The population increased in the 1931 census to a total of 1,891; 1,688 Muslims, 202 Christians, and 1 Jew, in a total of 400 houses.

In the 1945 statistics, Sakhnin had 2,600 inhabitants; 2310 Muslims and 290 Christians. The total jurisdiction of the village was 70,192 dunams of land. 3,622 dunams were used for plantations and irrigable land, 29,366 dunams for cereals, while 169 dunams were built-up (urban) land.

=== State of Israel ===
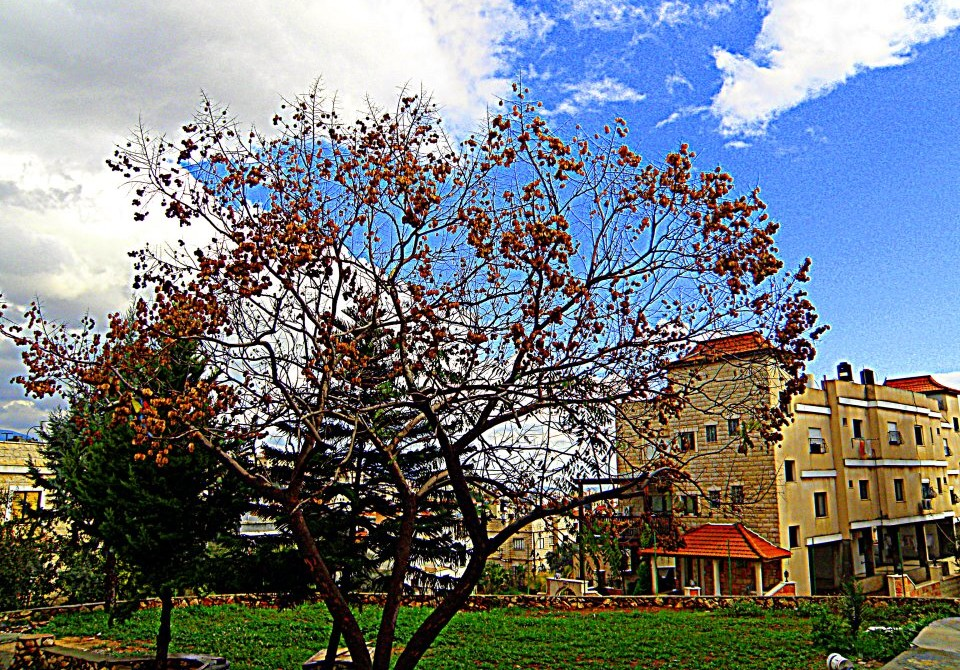
Sakhnin in the autumn

During the 1948 Arab-Israeli war, Sakhnin surrendered to Israeli forces on July 18, 1948, during Operation Dekel, but was re-captured by Arab forces shortly afterwards. It finally fell without battle during Operation Hiram, 29–31 October 1948. Many of the inhabitants fled north but some stayed and were not expelled by the Israeli soldiers. The town remained under martial law until 1966.

In 1976, it became the site of the first Land Day marches, in which six Israeli Arabs were killed by Israeli forces during violent protests of government expropriation of 5,000 acres (20 km^{2}) of Arab-owned land near Sakhnin. Later that same year, three more civilians were killed during clashes with the police. Two natives of the city were killed in Jerusalem during the al-Aqsa Intifada in 2000.

The Israeli transcription of the Arabic toponym is an orthographic error, writing Sakhnas instead of Sakhnin.

== Demographics ==
Historical population
Year	Pop.	±%
1972	8,500	—
1983	12,800	+50.6%
1995	17,900	+39.8%
2008	25,100	+40.2%
2022	32,355	+28.9%
2024	33,726	+4.2%

== Sports ==
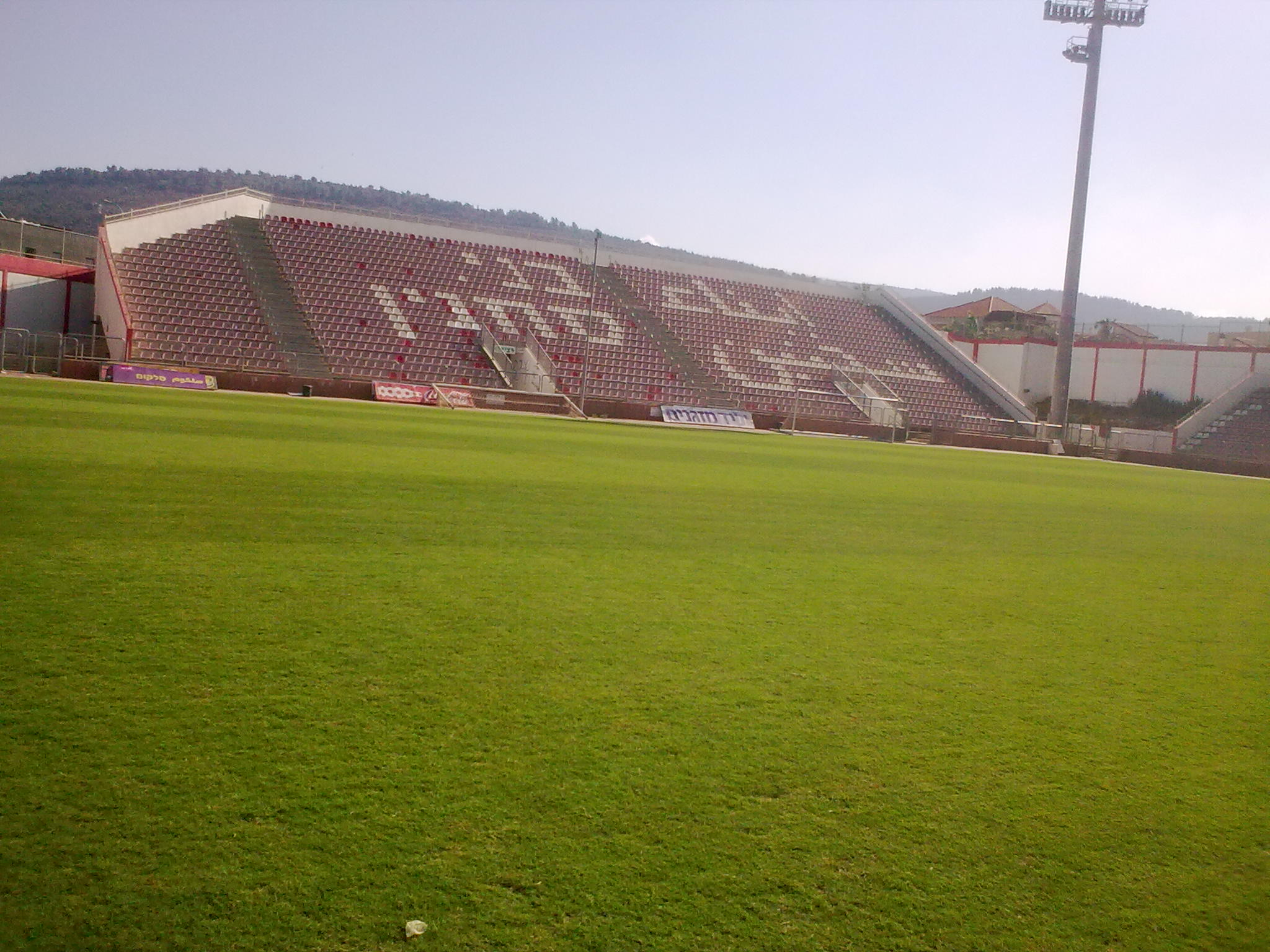
Doha Stadium

In 2003, the town's football club, Bnei Sakhnin, became one of the first Arab teams to play in the Israeli Premier League, the top tier of Israeli football. The following year, the club won the State Cup, and was the first Arab team to do so; consequently, it participated in the UEFA Cup the following season, losing out to Newcastle United. The team received a new home with the 2005 opening of Doha Stadium, funded by the Israeli government and the Qatar National Olympic Committee, whose capital it is named after. The stadium has a capacity of 5,000.

Sakhnin is also the hometown of Abbas Suan, an Israeli international footballer who previously played for Bnei Sakhnin. The town and their soccer team are the subject of the 2010 documentary film After The Cup: Sons of Sakhnin United

On 19 September 2008, Bnei Sakhnin played a game with the Spanish team Deportivo de La Coruña.

== Shrines ==
Sakhnin is home to two shrines:

A-Sheikh Siddiq (Arabic: النبي الصادق) is a shrine located in Sakhnin's historical core, close to the Christian cemetery. It features a Roman-period sarcophagus. The Arabs of Galilee, and the Bedouin of Arab el-Na'im in particular, used to conduct pilgrimages to the shrine in order to make vows and seek for health for themselves and their progeny. The residents of Sakhnin used to beg the saint's forgiveness whenever they went near it out of fear, especially at night. According to a local legend, a-Sheikh Siddiq fought both the Romans and pagans. He was burned by the Romans together with his daughters as he was holding a Torah book. Guerin also referenced another tradition, that claims a-Sheikh Siddiq was interred here next to his wife. Jewish tradition attributes this site to Rabbi Joshua of Sakhnin, an amora who lived in the village in the 4th century CE. Since the 13th century, the shrine has attracted Jewish and Muslim pilgrims alike.

A second shrine, a-Sheikh Ismai'l, is located in the Al-Khalaila clan cemetery in the heart of Sakhnin's western district. This location most likely refers to a local saint rather than the biblical and Quranic Isma'il. Residents of the village claim that one of them had a dream in which the sheikh complained that the sewage water was polluting his tomb. Then, to stop the pollution, this resident constructed a drainage. Every Friday, the women of the Al-Khalaila clan light candles in the tomb.

== Social structure ==
In 1986, the population stood at 16,000, of whom 90% were Sunni Muslims and 10% were Christians, evenly split between the Greek Orthodox and Greek Catholic churches. The inhabitants were divided between seventeen hamulas (extended families or clans) as well as refugee and immigrant families who settled there after the 1948 war. The five large hamulas, Khalaileh (Khalayla), Ghneim (Ghunaym), Othman (Uthman), Abu Raya and Zbeidat (Zubaydat), numbered between 1,000 to 3,500 members. The five medium-sized clans, the Trabiye (Tarabiya, descendants of the Turabay Bedouins), Shewahneh, Badarneh, Shal'ata and Bashir, numbered 500 to 1,000 members and the seven smaller hamulas numbered less than 500.

The Khalaileh and Shewahneh both resided in the western quarter, the Ghneim, Othman, Bashir, Abu Yunis and Abu Salih in the east, the Abu Raya, Trabiyeh, Shal'ata and Badarneh in the south and the Zbeidat, part of the Shewahneh and the Christians in the north. The quarters functioned as a social unit, with all residents of the quarter expected to show political solidarity, participate in each other's weddings and funerals, and defend the quarter's collective honor against transgressions.

The Christians consisted of five of the town's smaller hamulas, but these divisions were less relevant for the Christians than their denominational differences; between 1948 and 1986, there were five instances of intermarriage between Orthodox and Catholic residents, and while there had been a single mukhtar for the whole community before 1948, each had its own leader afterward. In 1986, the Christians generally attained higher education than the Muslim residents and produced Sakhnin's first physician. Most were employed in business, professions and education and maintained good relations with authorities.

== Voting patterns ==
In the 2022 election, 98 percent of voters in Sakhnin voted for the Arab parties, while 1 percent voted for the parties of the center-left coalition led by Yair Lapid and 0.6 percent voted for the parties of the right-wing coalition led by Benjamin Netanyahu. Among the voters for the Arab parties, 39 percent voted for the Hadash–Ta'al list, while 31 percent voted for Balad and 30 percent voted for Ra'am.

In the 2026 election, 97 percent of voters in Sakhnin voted for the Arab parties, while 2 percent voted for the parties of the center-left coalition led by Gadi Eisenkot and 0.2 percent voted for the parties of the right-wing coalition led by Benjamin Netanyahu. Among the voters for the Arab parties, 67 percent voted for the Joint List, while 33 percent voted for Ra'am. Voter turnout increased 40 percent from the 2022 election.

== Notable people ==
- Mazen Ghnaim, Mayor of Sakhnin 2008―2018, and 2024―present
- Masud Ghnaim, Member of the Knesset, 2009―2019

== See also ==
- Arab localities in Israel
- Arab Museum of Contemporary Art and Heritage

== Bibliography ==
- Al-Haj, Majid; Rosenfeld, Henry (1990). Arab Local Government In Israel. Avalon Publishing. ISBN 9780813377612.
- Barron, J.B., ed. (1923). Palestine: Report and General Abstracts of the Census of 1922. Government of Palestine.
- Conder, C.R.; Kitchener, H.H. (1881). The Survey of Western Palestine: Memoirs of the Topography, Orography, Hydrography, and Archaeology. Vol. 1. London: Committee of the Palestine Exploration Fund.
- Dauphin, C. (1998). La Palestine byzantine, Peuplement et Populations. BAR International Series 726 (in French). Vol. III : Catalogue. Oxford: Archeopress. ISBN 0-860549-05-4.
- Ellenblum, R. (2003). Frankish Rural Settlement in the Latin Kingdom of Jerusalem. Cambridge University Press. ISBN 9780521521871.
- Frankel, Rafael (1988). "Topographical notes on the territory of Acre in the Crusader period". Israel Exploration Journal. 38 (4): 249–272.
- Government of Palestine, Department of Statistics (1945). Village Statistics, April, 1945.
- Guérin, V. (1880). Description Géographique Historique et Archéologique de la Palestine (in French). Vol. 3: Galilee, pt. 1. Paris: L'Imprimerie Nationale.
- Hadawi, S. (1970). Village Statistics of 1945: A Classification of Land and Area ownership in Palestine. Palestine Liberation Organization Research Center.
- Hütteroth, W.-D.; Abdulfattah, K. (1977). Historical Geography of Palestine, Transjordan and Southern Syria in the Late 16th Century. Erlanger Geographische Arbeiten, Sonderband 5. Erlangen, Germany: Vorstand der Fränkischen Geographischen Gesellschaft. ISBN 3-920405-41-2.
- Mills, E., ed. (1932). Census of Palestine 1931. Population of Villages, Towns and Administrative Areas. Jerusalem: Government of Palestine.
- Morris, B. (1987). The Birth of the Palestinian refugee problem, 1947-1949. Cambridge University Press. ISBN 0-521-33028-9.
- Palmer, E.H. (1881). The Survey of Western Palestine: Arabic and English Name Lists Collected During the Survey by Lieutenants Conder and Kitchener, R. E. Transliterated and Explained by E.H. Palmer. Committee of the Palestine Exploration Fund.
- Rhode, H. (1979). Administration and Population of the Sancak of Safed in the Sixteenth Century (PhD). Columbia University. Archived from the original on 2019-04-20.
- Robinson, E.; Smith, E. (1841). Biblical Researches in Palestine, Mount Sinai and Arabia Petraea: A Journal of Travels in the year 1838. Vol. 3. Boston: Crocker & Brewster.
- Röhricht, R. (1893). (RRH) Regesta regni Hierosolymitani (MXCVII-MCCXCI) (in Latin). Berlin: Libraria Academica Wageriana.
- Schumacher, G. (1888). "Population list of the Liwa of Akka". Quarterly Statement - Palestine Exploration Fund. 20: 169–191.
- Strehlke, E., ed. (1869). Tabulae Ordinis Theutonici ex tabularii regii Berolinensis codice potissimum. Berlin: Weidmanns.
- Tahan, Hagit (2005-12-29). "Sakhnin". Hadashot Arkheologiyot – Excavations and Surveys in Israel (117).
- Tsafrir, Y.; Leah Di Segni; Judith Green (1994). (TIR): Tabula Imperii Romani: Judaea, Palaestina. Jerusalem: Israel Academy of Sciences and Humanities. ISBN 965-208-107-8.
