= Angélica Dass =

Brazilian photographer

- Born: 1979 (age 46–47); Rio de Janeiro, Brazil
- Known for: Humanæ
- Website: https://angelicadass.com/

Angélica Dass (born 1979) is a Brazilian photographer based in Madrid, Spain and the creator of the photographic project Humanæ. With this project, she has created portraits of many different people from all over the world, showing a wide range of age groups, skin colors and personal backgrounds. Her aim is to invite viewers to recognize the similarity of humans, regardless of individual differences.

In March 2016, Dass gave a TED talk called "The beauty of human skin in every color" about how skin colors "make us see each other as different, even though we are equal."

== Biography ==
Angélica Dass was born in Rio de Janeiro, Brazil, in 1979 and is based in Madrid, Spain. She combines her photographic work with sociological investigation and public participation as a contribution to human rights all over the world.

== Work ==
Angelica Dass's work goes beyond photographic exhibitions and is also used in classrooms or open spaces to create public awareness. She also has presented her photographic work at universities, such as the University of Salamanca, the University of Bologna, or the UERJ - Rio de Janeiro, as well as at venues such as the Tate Modern and the World Economic Forum.

== Project Humanæ ==
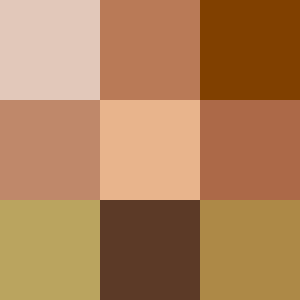
Sample Pantone color block showing hues for the color "chestnut"

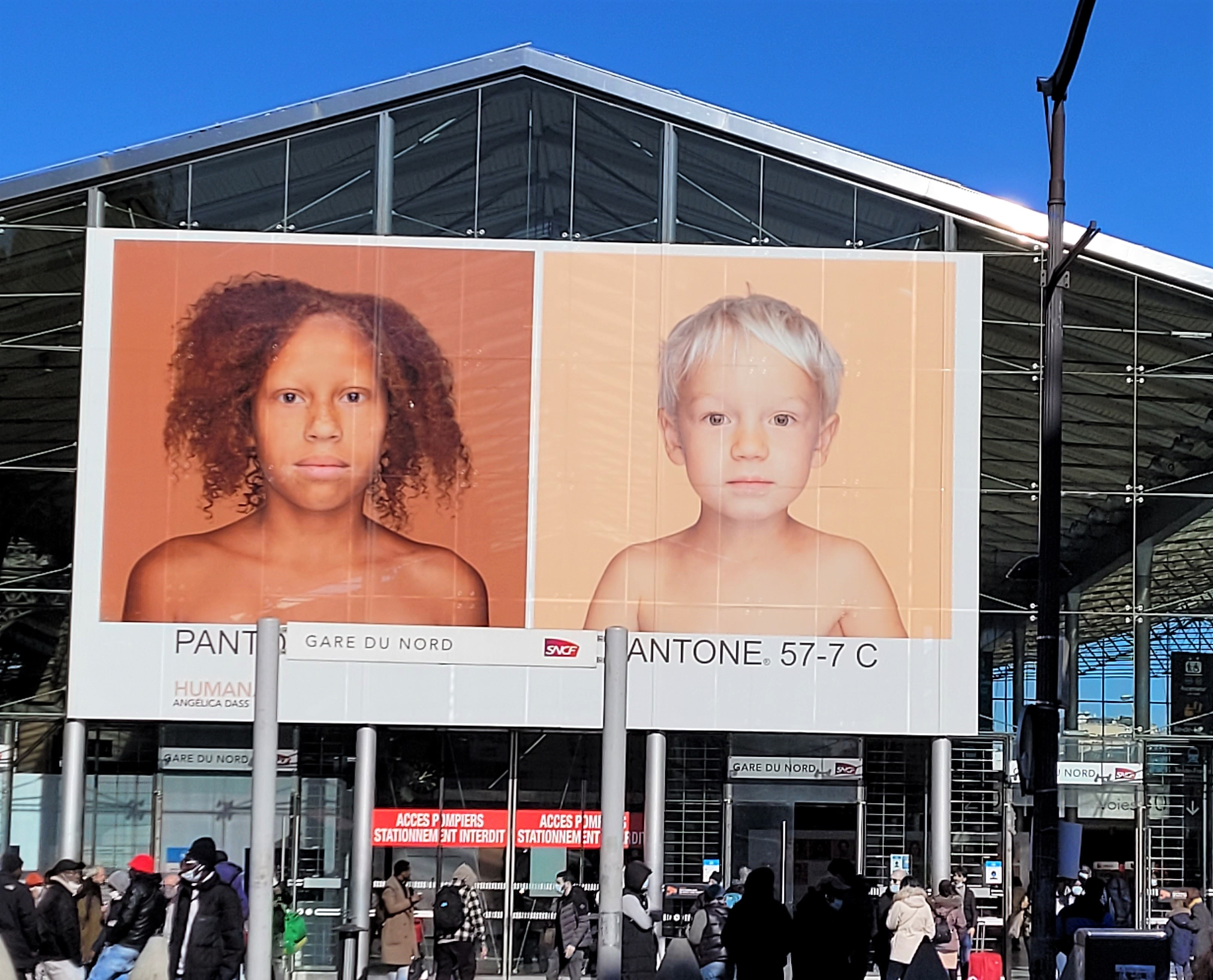
Open air exhibition of project Humanæ by Angélica Dass in Paris 2022

In 2012, Dass started her project Humanæ as a work-in-progress while studying at Spain's ETI. She began with portrait photographs of her Spanish husband, herself and their families. By matching a strip of pixels from the nose of a person's photograph to color cards from the Pantone color system, she has created a catalog of human skin colors that are displayed as a collage of Pantone portraits. This display is intended to create awareness about how we see each other and how we view race, ethnicity and identity It includes over 4,000 pictures of people in more than 17 countries and 27 cities around the world.

Humanæ is presented as a traveling exhibition and has been shown, among other places, in Spain, South Korea; Italy, Israel, the United Kingdom, Canada and the United States, and at Habitat III, the UN Conference on Housing and Sustainable Urban Development, in Quito, Ecuador.

In February and March 2022, an open air exhibition of her portraits was shown at the Gare du Nord in Paris, France, with several panels of individual portraits and two extra large pictures at the exterior of the train station.

From October 2023 to March 2024, the Wellcome Collection in London presented an exhibition titled "The Cult of Beauty". With more than 200 objects and artworks from a large variety of historical eras and geographic regions, the show presented different cultural notions of human beauty and industries related to social standards of beauty. Referring to photographic displays by Dass included in the show, The Observer's art critic Laura Cumming commented:

Since 2012, the Brazilian artist Angélica Dass has been photographing people of all ages and races, matching pixels from the nose of each subject to a Pantone colour that forms the background. Her camera is so attentive, the uniqueness of each being so graciously emphasised, that every face is as beautiful to the eye as the human race should be.

— Laura Cumming, The Observer, The Cult of Beauty review – delusional, divine, deadly…
