= Norton Museum of Art =

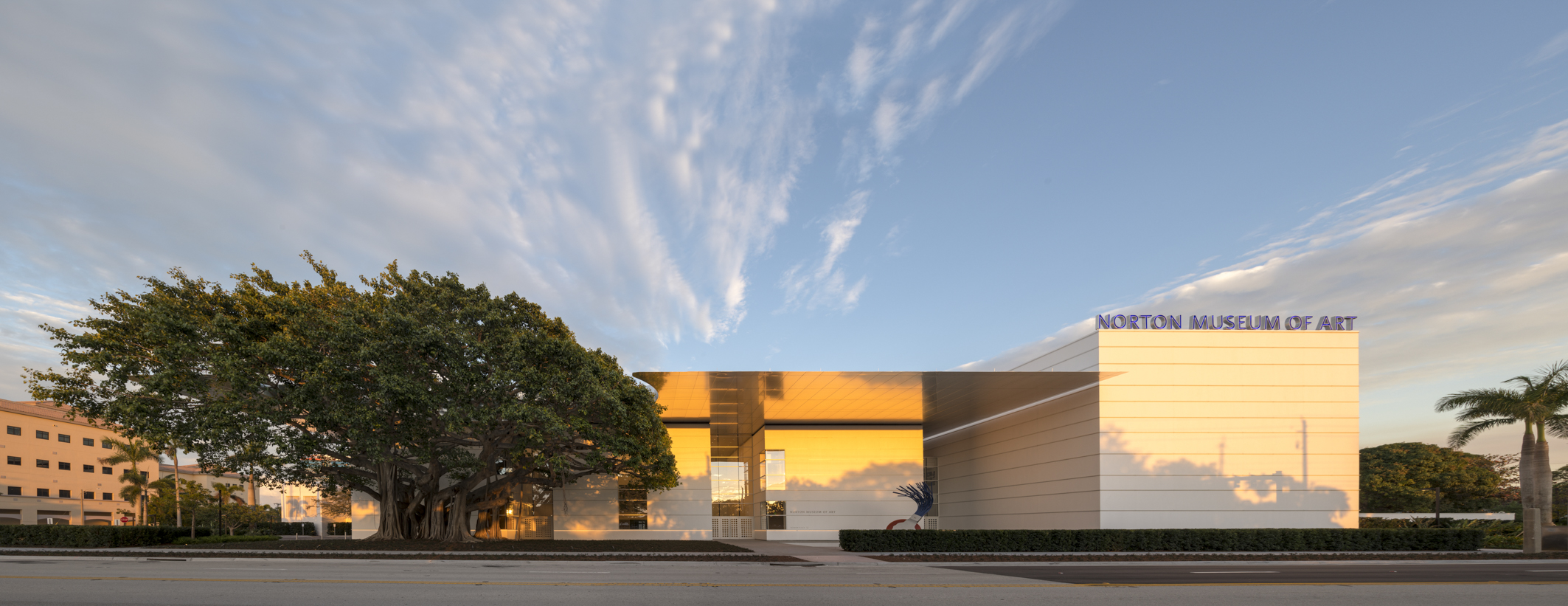

- Norton Museum of Art in West Palm Beach, Florida
- Established: 1941
- Location: West Palm Beach, Florida
- Coordinates: 26.700782°N 80.053000°W
- Type: Art museum
- Director: Ghislain d'Humières
- Architects: Marion Sims Wyeth and Lord Norman Foster
- Website: norton.org

The Norton Museum of Art is an art museum in West Palm Beach, Florida, United States. Its collection includes over 8,200 works, with a concentration in European, American, and Chinese art as well as in contemporary art and photography. In 2003, it overtook the John and Mable Ringling Museum of Art, in Sarasota, to become the largest museum in Florida.

== History ==
The Norton Museum of Art was founded in 1941 by Ralph Hubbard Norton (1875–1953) and his first wife, Elizabeth Calhoun Norton (1881–1947).

Norton, the former head of the Chicago-based Acme Steel Co., moved to West Palm Beach upon retirement and decided to share his collection of paintings and sculptures. The late Art Deco/Neoclassical building designed by Marion Sims Wyeth opened its doors to the public on February 8, 1941. Its mission statement is "to preserve for the future the beautiful things of the past."

== About ==
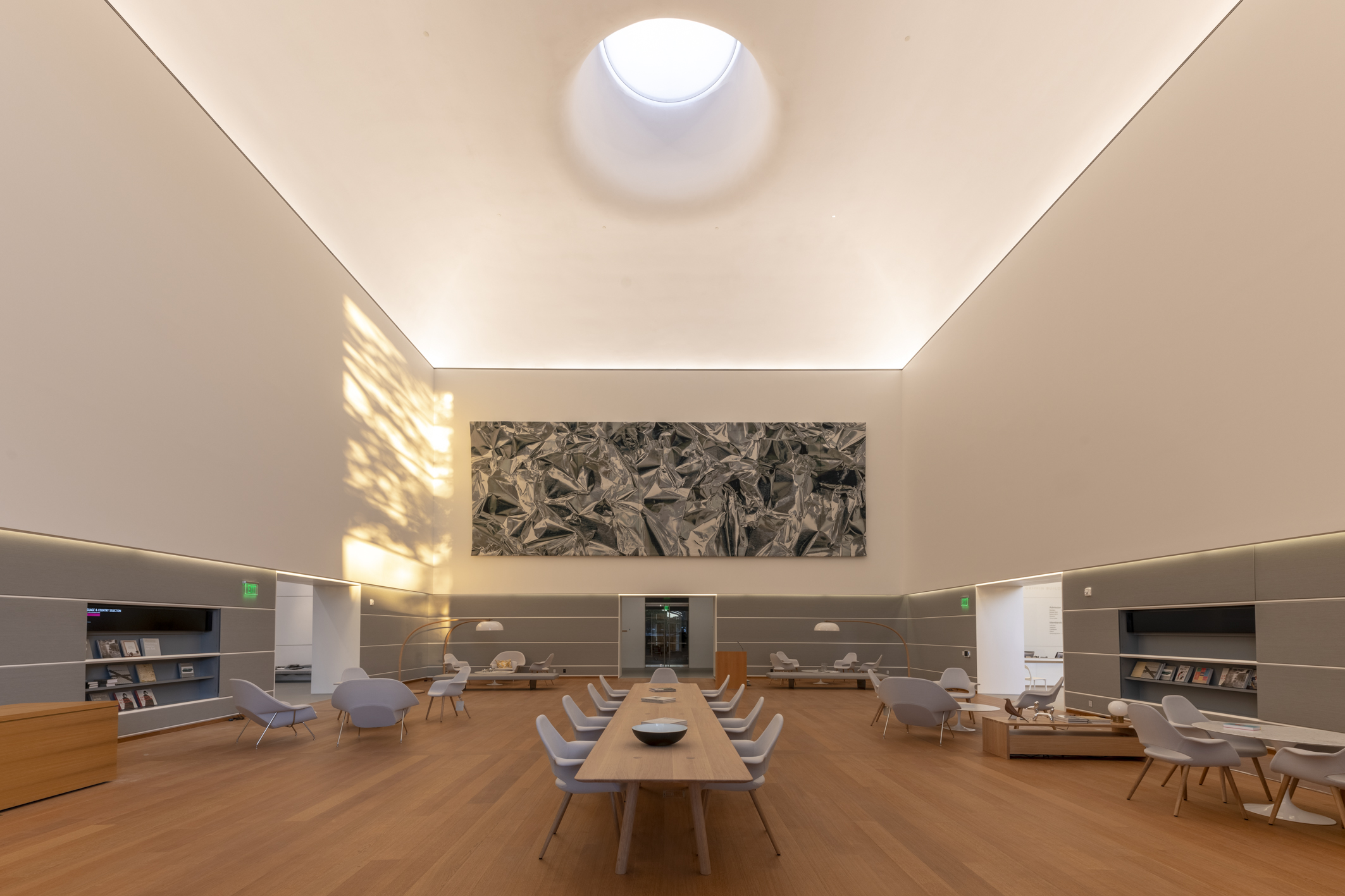
Ruth and Carl Shapiro Great Hall, featuring Pae White's tapestry Eikón

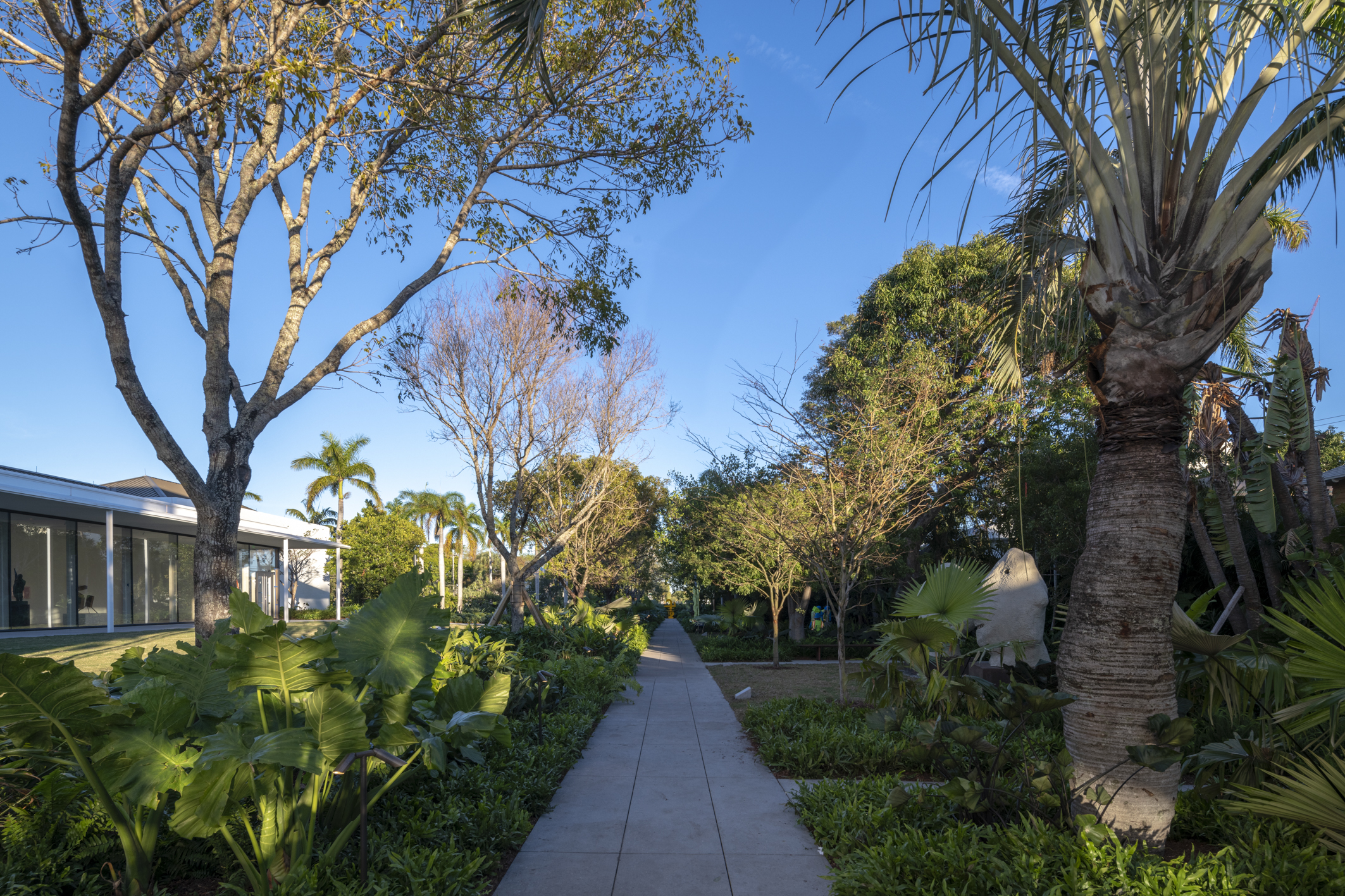
The Pamela and Robert B. Goergen Garden walkway

In 2001, the Norton Museum of Art underwent a significant expansion when the 45,000-square-foot (4,200 m^{2}) Gail and Melvin Nessel Wing was built and increased the size of the museum to 122,500 square feet (11,380 m^{2}).

In 2013, the museum unveiled a $60 million master plan designed by the British architect Norman Foster that would nearly double its gallery space and add an education center, auditorium and restaurant. The new West Wing added a 43-foot-high Great Hall. A parking lot next to the museum was converted into a 9,000-square-foot sculpture garden. A new entrance and forecourt along the main thoroughfare, South Dixie Highway, re-established the axial layout of Norton's original 1941 Art Deco building. As planned, the museum broke ground in 2016.

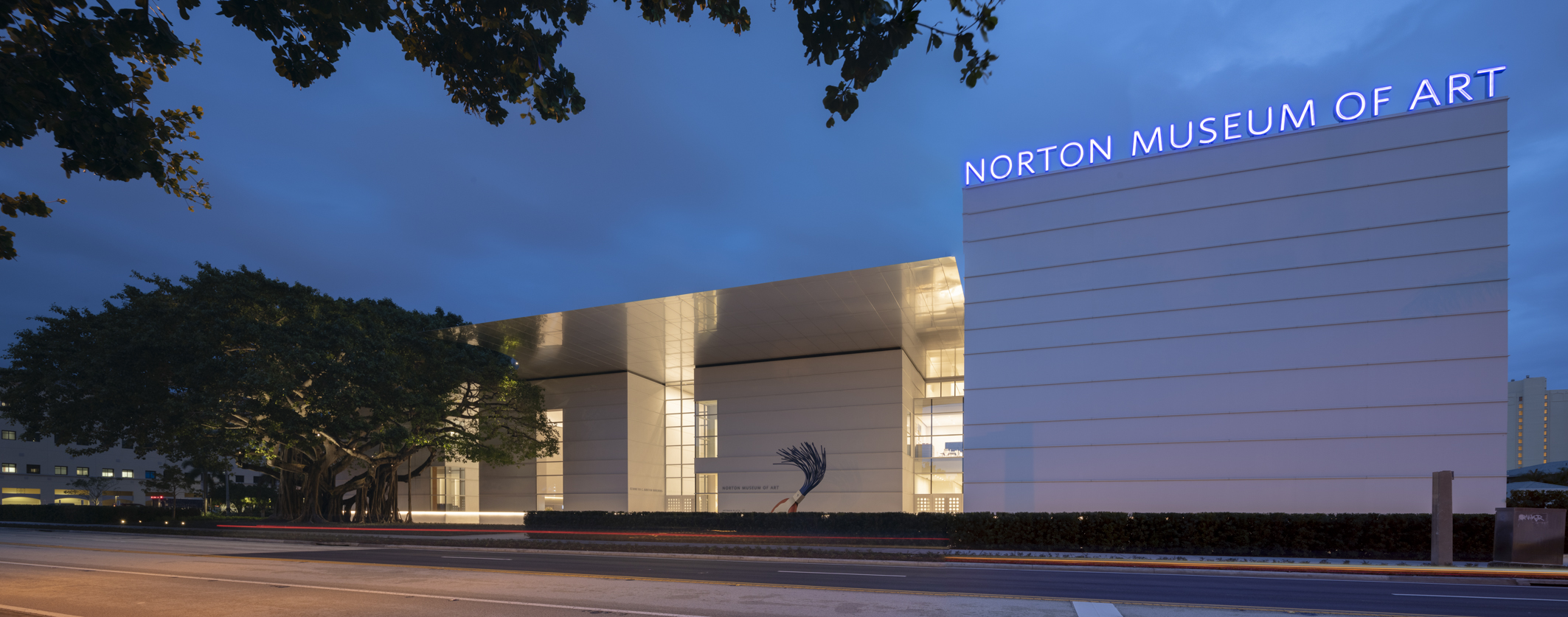
Front angle view of redesigned Norton Museum of Art in February 2019, designed by Foster & Partners

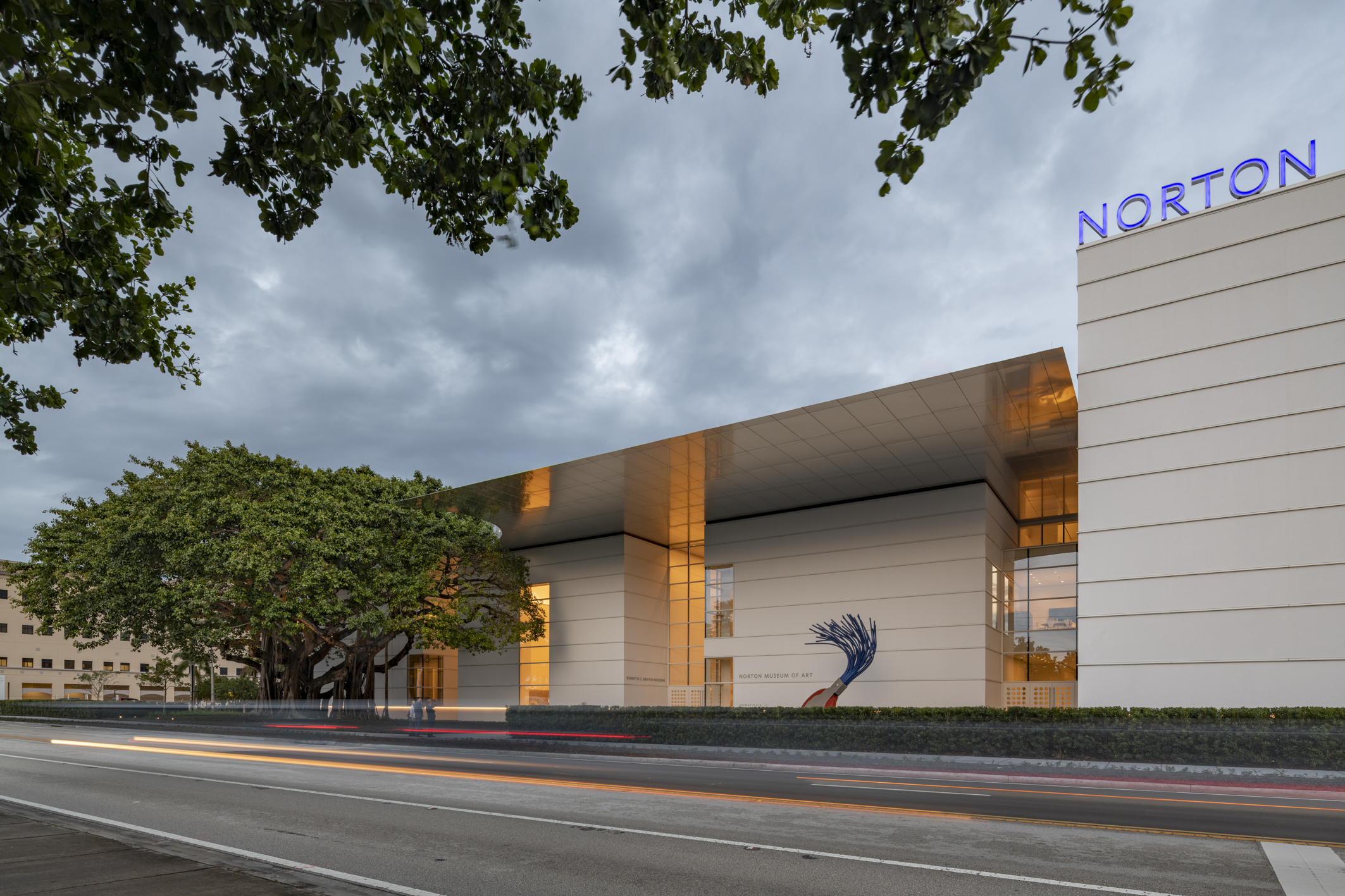
Front angle view of redesigned Norton Museum of Art in February 2019, designed by Foster & Partners

The museum closed in July 2018 for renovations. It reopened on February 9, 2019, adding 12,000 square feet (1,100 m^{2}) of gallery space, new classrooms, a restaurant, a 210-seat auditorium, and the sculpture garden.

Norton Museum closed for eight months in 2020 because of the COVID-19 pandemic. It reopened in November 2020 with new exhibits and safety precautions.

The museum hosts several special programs, including Lectures & Conversations, Art After Dark, Special Performances, Art Classes and Workshops, Families & Teens, Students & Teachers, and the Artist in Residence Program.

Its current hours are Monday, Wednesday, Thursday, and Saturday from 10 am to 5 pm. It is closed on Tuesday. It is open Friday from 10 am to 10 pm and Sunday from 11 am to 5 pm. Art after Dark occurs on Friday nights.

== Collection ==
The ground-level galleries showcase contemporary and 20th-century American and European art and a comprehensive collection of Chinese works. On the top floor of the museum are noteworthy paintings by late Medieval Italian painter Jacopo Da Firenze, Lucas Cranach the Elder, Joos van Cleve and Studio, Marcantonio Franceschini, Nicolas de Largillière, Peter Paul Rubens, Anthony van Dyck, David Teniers and Studio, Jan Thomas Yperen, Joshua Reynolds, Thomas Gainsborough, and Giovanni Panini. There also are examples of Chinese export porcelain.

In 2018, the Norton Museum of Art received a gift of more than 100 works from the collection of Howard and Judie Ganek, including pieces by Damien Hirst, Anselm Kiefer, Sigmar Polke, Ed Ruscha, Kara Walker, Donald Judd, Matthew Barney, Nan Goldin, Cindy Sherman, Lorna Simpson, and Pipilotti Rist.

== Rudin Prize for Emerging Photography ==
In 2012, the Norton Museum of Art launched the Rudin Prize for Emerging Photographers, with a $20,000 prize. It was initiated by Beth Rudin DeWoody and is given biennially to an emerging photographer who has never had a museum show.

2012

The inaugural Rudin Prize was awarded to Analia Saban, nominated by John Baldessari. The other nominees were:

- Eunice Adorno, nominated by Susan Meiselas
- Mauro D’Agati, nominated by Michal Rovner
- Gabriela Nin Solis, nominated by Graciela Iturbide
- Bjørn Venø, nominated by Yinka Shonibare

2014

The second Rudin Prize was awarded to Rami Maymon, nominated by Adi Nes. The other nominees were:

- Miriam Böhm, nominated by Thomas Demand
- Delphine Fawundu, nominated by Deborah Willis
- Renato Osoy, nominated by Luis González Palma

2016

The third Rudin Prize was awarded to Elizabeth Bick, nominated by Shirin Neshat. The other nominees were:

- Clare Benson, nominated by Arno Rafael Minkkinen
- Wesley Stringer, nominated by Michael Kenna
- Alexandra Hunts, nominated by Rineke Dijkstra

2020

The Rudin Prize was awarded to Kristin-Lee Moolman, nominated by Cindy Sherman. The other nominees were:

- David Spero, nominated by Ori Gersht
- Jess T. Duggan, nominated by Dawoud Bey
- Lina Hashim, nominated by Trine Søndergaard

== Leadership ==
- 2021–: Ghislain d'Humières
- 2019–2020: Elliot Bostwick Davis
- 2010–2019: Hope Alswang
- 1990–2009: Christina Orr-Cahall
