= International Photography Festival (Israel) =

International Photography Festival פסטיבל הצילום הבינלאומי
- Status: Active
- Genre: Festival
- Frequency: yearly
- Locations: Tel Aviv, Rishon Lezion, Jaffa
- Country: Israel
- Years active: 2009-
- Inaugurated: 2009
- Founder: Eldad Rafaeli, Eyal Landesman
- Major events: Photography
- People: Yitzhak Goren; Maya Anner

International Photography Festival is an international art fair of photography and multimedia art held annually since 2012 in Israel and produced by PHOTO IS:RAEL.

== History ==
Each year, Israeli International Photography Festival is held in different venue and chooses different main theme. Usually it consists of main exhibition, curated by Festival organizers and several small exhibitions, presented by guest galleries from around the world or curated by guest curators. The festival of 2014, which was held in Rishon Lezion, contained about 1000 pictures by 265 photographers. The displays were divided into 25 exhibitions.

== Festivals ==
- 2009 Hatachana Complex. Tel Aviv. Theme: Point of View.
- 2012 Jaffa Port. Theme: Sustainability.
- 2014 Rishon Lezion. Theme: Photographic Memory.
- 2016 Jaffa Port. Theme: Safe Space.
- 2017 Midtown Tel Aviv. Tel Aviv. Theme: Identity.
- 2018 "Golf" Complex. Tel Aviv. Theme: Relations.
- 2019 "Azrieli Sarona". Tel Aviv

== Photo Is:Rael ==
Photo Is:Rael is a non-profit public company behind the International Photography Festival. Founded in 2012, it started its activities with the festival, but gradually expanded to different projects. The organisation's motto is “better society through the language of photography”. Photo Is:Rael is working on social outreach and dialogue between art and various communities across Israel. Since its formation, the organization has offered different platforms for exhibition and research in photography. The organization developed method, called Photo is Voice, which is based on the belief that every individual in society has the right to represent themselves, their worldview and their message in a direct and unmediated way.

The members of PHOTO IS:VOICE program are social activists, volunteers, and professionals in the fields of photography and special education. The majority of program participants are coming from marginalized communities - addicts, people with disabilities, women, and youth-at-risk, different minority groups, the elderly, youth on the autism spectrum and more. They photograph themselves, crafting a direct message of their community.

== Notable participants ==
Over the last 10 years, a lot of notable photographers and curators have been involved or associated with the International Photography Festival at some point in their careers, including Roger Ballen, Angélica Dass, Paolo Pellegrin, Raghu Rai, Angelika Sher, Nissan N. Perez, David Adika, Gaston Zvi Ickowicz, Igor Zeiger.

== Meitar Award for Excellence in Photography ==
The Zvi and Ofra Meitar Foundation and "PHOTO IS:RAEL" started to award Meitar Award for Excellence in Photography in 2017. Twenty finalists and winner are exhibited during the International Photography Festival. The 2018 Meitar Award Finalist exhibition will also be exhibited at the international Head On Festival in Sydney, Australia in May 2019.

== See also ==
- Visual arts in Israel
