= Umm al-Fahm Art Gallery =

Art gallery in Umm al-Fahm, Israel

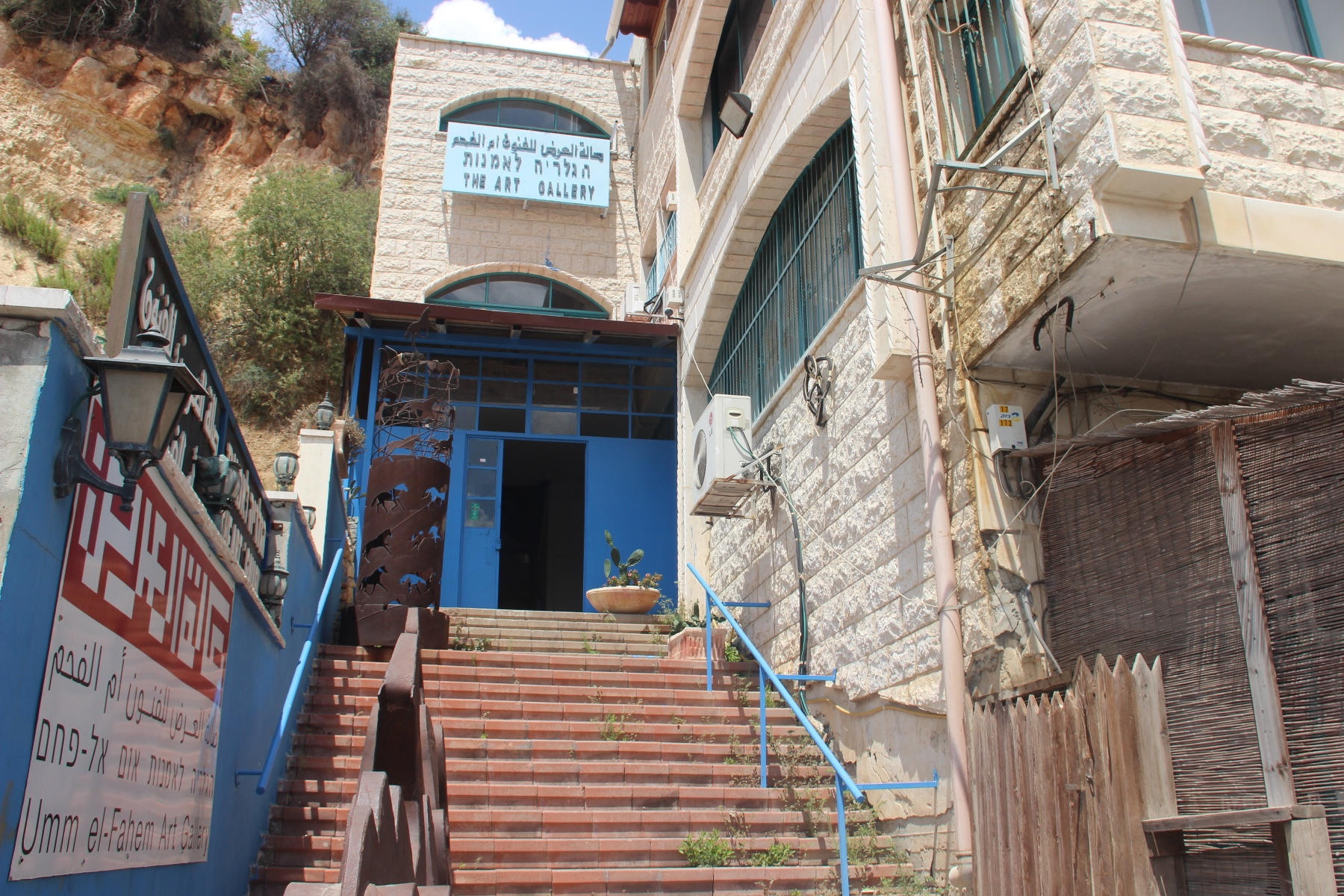
- Established: 1996
- Location: Haifa St, Umm al-Fahm, Israel
- Coordinates: 32.523833°N 35.154167°E
- Type: Art
- Director: Sayid Abu Shaqra
- Website: ummelfahemgallery.org

The Umm al-Fahm Art Gallery (Arabic: صالة العرض للفنون أم الفحم; Hebrew: הגלריה לאמנות אום אל־פחם) is an art gallery in Umm al-Fahm, Israel. The art gallery focuses on Israeli–Arab artwork, run by artist Sayid Abu Shaqra.

In July 2024, the gallery was recognized by the Museums Council as a museum, thus becoming the first museum of contemporary art in Arab society in Israel.

== History ==
The gallery was founded in 1996 in the heart of Umm al-Fahm, as the initiative of artist Sayid Abu Shaqra, who to this day serves as the gallery's director and head curator. Jewish and Arab artists' works can be found at the gallery, as well as works of other Arab artists and from the Western World. This gallery is said to be the meeting place for Israeli and Arab artists.

== The Umm el-Fahem Museum of Contemporary Art project ==
Owing to the success of the gallery, the gallery's management turned to Zaha Hadid in order to design a museum in Umm al-Fahm, though due to several delays Hadid dropped out of the project, and was replaced by Israeli-Arab architect Sanaan Abd al-Qadr. Due to several disagreements, his offer was denied, and a contest to find a suitable architect to design the museum was launched. In 2006, during a ceremony held in the Tel Aviv Museum of Art, the building of the Umm al-Fahm Museum for Contemporary Art was declared. The contest was won by architects Amnon Bar Or, Lior Zionov, and Lior Vitkin.

=== Cancellation of museum project ===
The project had to be inaugurated in 2013, but it was cancelled due to lack of budget, when sponsors from Gulf states found out the Israeli government is supporting the creation of the museum. Abu Shaqra had to give up on the plan to build a new museum. He currently tries to receive an official recognition as a museum in the gallery’s present 1700 square meter building.
