= WIZO Haifa Academy of Design and Education =

Art school in Haifa, Israel

Coordinates: 32°49′17″N 34°59′24″E

The Haifa University School of Design, established following a merger between the Neri Bloomfield School of Design and Education, formerly known as WIZO Haifa, and the University of Haifa. Before the merger, the academic center served as a college for training designers, integrating education studies into its programs.

The School of Design is located on the Campus Hamoshava in the German Colony of Haifa.

The Haifa School of Design, named after Neri Bloomfield and formerly WIZO Canada, is the leading professional and academic institution for higher education in art in northern Israel. The school Dean is Prof. Leah Peretz.

== History ==
The academy was founded in 1971 by the international WIZO organization to train professional artists and art teachers. Initially, the academy shared a building with the WIZO High School of Art in the neighbourhood of Upper Hadar. In 2004, the academy moved down to a refurbished modern building in the German Colony. In 2024 it was merged into the University of Haifa.

== Departments ==
The academy has six departments in the design professions - Architecture, Graphic design, Photography and Film and Fashion design. The design studies are combined with getting a diploma in education, and the academy is thus destined to qualify the students to become teachers in the post-primary schools in the fields of design and art.

== Building ==
The building that houses the academy today, formerly a youth centre owned by the city, was renovated by architects Yoram Poper and Esti & Eli Hirsch (E. E. Hirsch Architects) together with Galit Rmeo and Luciano Santandreu, winners of the design competition. The entrance floor serves as a gallery for alternating exhibitions of the students and artists. The building's interior was designed in a modern and dynamic style, whereas its exterior blends with the character of other old structures in the German Colony.
