= Uri Gershuni =

Israeli photographer and educator

Uri Gershuni אורי גרשוני
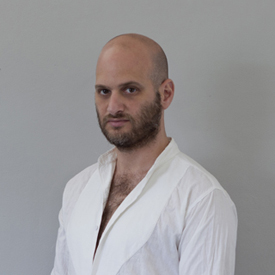
- Born: 1970 (age 55–56); Raanana, Israel
- Education: Bezalel Academy of Arts and Design
- Known for: Photography,
- Movement: Israeli art, modern art

Uri Gershuni (Hebrew: אורי גרשוני; born 1970) is an Israeli photographer and educator.

== Biography ==
Uri Gershuni was born in Raanana in 1970. He is son of Israeli painter Moshe Gershuni and sculptor and jewelry designer Bianca Eshel Gershuni.

Gershuni graduated from Bezalel Academy of Arts and Design’s Photography Department, holding BFA and MFA. He teaches at the Bezalel Academy of Arts and Design and in WIZO Haifa Academy of Design and Education. He works and lives in Tel Aviv.

He was a photographer for Yedioth Ahronoth from 2003 and 2007. From 2009 he has worked as a photographer for Haaretz.

Uri Gershuni works are in permanent collections of Tel Aviv Museum of Art, Haifa Museum of Art, Israel Museum, Petah Tikva Museum of Art, Shpilman Institute of Photography.

He is gay.

== Exhibitions ==
=== Israel ===
City	Venue	Type	Collection/Installation	Year(s)	Ref
Ashdod	Ashdod Museum of Art	Group	A Road to Nowhere	2011	
Ashdod	Ashdod Museum of Art	Group	Young Artist Awards	2013	
Bat Yam	David Ben-Ari Museum for Contemporary Art	Group	Sweet 16	2007	
Beit Berl	Hmidrasha Art Gallery	Solo	"The Phantom Menace"	2000	
Beit Berl	Hmidrasha Art Gallery	Solo	"Department"	2006	
Beit Berl	Ha'midrasha Photography Gallery	Solo	"Yesterday's Sun, Photography Book No. 1" (Curator: Noa Ben-Shalom)	2013	
Haifa	Haifa City Museum	Group	Between the Mountain and the Sea	2000	
Haifa	Haifa Museum of Art	Solo	"I Have a Gigantic Electricity Bill Too"	1999	
Haifa	Haifa Museum of Art	Group	Boys craft	2007	
Haifa	Haifa Museum of Art	Group	Haifa Museum of Art Collection: Dynasties	2014	
Haifa	New Aggaf Gallery	Group	Be My Guest	2013	
Haifa	University of Haifa Gallery	Group	Home	2003	
Haifa	University of Haifa Gallery	Group	Click....grrrr...	2008	
Herzliya	Herzliya Museum of Contemporary Art	Group	Behind Closed Doors	2003	
Herzliya	Herzliya Museum of Contemporary Art	Group	Eventually we'll die, young israeli art of the 90's	2008	
Herzliya	Herzliya Museum of Contemporary Art	Group	Cabinets of Wonder in Contemporary Art: From Astonishment to Disenchantment	2012	
Herzliya	Herzliya Museum of Contemporary Art	Group	"In the Court of the White Lady" (Curator: Aya Lurie)	2015	
Jerusalem	Israel Museum	Group	Books	2005	
Jerusalem	Israel Museum	Group	The Homes of Others	2008	
Jerusalem	Israel Museum	Group	Journeys (Curator: Kobi Ben Meir)	2014	
Jerusalem	Israel Museum	Solo	"Apollo and the Chimney Sweeper" (Curator: Noam Gal)	2015	
Jerusalem	Mishkenot Sha'ananim Gallery	Group	Streetwise	2008	
Jerusalem	Musrara School	Group	Youth	2008	
Jerusalem	Musrara School	Group	Teachers (Curators: Avi Sabag and Ayelet Hashahar Cohen)	2012	
Jerusalem	Musrara School	Group	The Time Defined by Human Beings is But a Dream (Curator: Ilanit Konopny)	2012	
Jerusalem	Musrara School	Group	The Wilderness My Brother Wanders (Curator: Eyal Ben Dov)	2013	
Kfar Saba	Kfar Saba City Gallery	Group	Culture Club (Curator: Hadassa Gorohovski)	2012	
Kiryat Tiv'on	Oranim Art Institute	Group	Mother	2003	
Kiryat Tiv'on	Oranim Art Institute	Group	Stills	2007	
Machanayim	Machanyim Art Gallery	Solo	"Cruciferae Family"	2001	
Petah Tikva	Petah Tikva Museum	Group	After	2006	
Ra'anana	Open University Gallery	Group	Sacred or Sacrilege? (Curator: Alec Mishory)	2013	
Ramat Gan	Ramat Gan Museum	Group	Ho mama	1997	
Ramat Gan	Ramat Gan Museum	Group	Minister of Culture Prize for Young Artist	2001	
Ramat Gan	Ramat Gan Museum	Group	Men	2006	
Ramleh	Ramleh City Gallery	Group	Snapshot	2008	
Rishon LeZion	Rishon LeZion City Gallery	Group	Sleep	2007	
Umm al-Fahm	Umm al-Fahm Art Gallery	Group	Fragile Line	2002	
Tel Aviv	A.A. Silver Gallery	Group	Plastic Sheet	2001	
Tel Aviv	Art Israel Internet Biennial 2	Group	Negotiation (Curator: Shalom Amira)	2012	
Tel Aviv	Artspace	Group	Portraits	2004	
Tel Aviv	BAAD Gallery	Group	Random	2012	
Tel Aviv	Baaley Hamelacha Gallery	Group	Net Games	2010	
Tel Aviv	Bealey Melacha	Group	Noise	2011	
Tel Aviv	Beir Ha'ir	Group	Night Stamp (Curator: Ayelet Bitan Shlonsky)	2013	
Tel Aviv	Beit Meyuhas	Group	The End of the World (Galit Semel)	2012	
Tel Aviv	Beit Reuven	Group	In those days	2004	
Tel Aviv	Bezalel-Salame Gallery	Group	Flock	2008	
Tel Aviv	Bezalel-Salame Gallery	Group	Four Openings in Israeli Art	2009	
Tel Aviv	Bezalel-Salame Gallery	Group	Casino Ayalon	2011	
Tel Aviv	Bineth Gallery	Group	Art Couture	2010	
Tel Aviv	Binyamin Gallery	Group	What is to Become (Curator: Etty Schwartz)	2013	
Tel Aviv	Braverman Gallery	Group	Reunion	2004	
Tel Aviv	The Center for Contemporary Art	Group	Knitted Registry (Curator: Ruty Chinsky-Amity)	2013	
Tel Aviv	Chelouche Gallery	Group	Re-location	2010	
Tel Aviv	Chelouche Gallery	Solo	"Yesterday's Sun"	2012	
Tel Aviv	Chelouche Gallery	Group	Time After Time	2013	
Tel Aviv	Chelouche Gallery	Solo	"Nothing but Darkness"	2015	
Tel Aviv	D&A Gallery	Group	Closer	2007	
Tel Aviv	The Diaghilev	Group	Be My Guest	2010	
Tel Aviv	Eretz Israel Museum	Group	Local Testimony 2013 (Curator: Moran Shoub)	2013	
Tel Aviv	Feinberg Projects Gallery	Group	Surface Currents (Curator: Yham Hameiri)	2013	
Tel Aviv	Gal-on-Gallery	Group	Z-B-A	2009	
Tel Aviv	Hachalalit Gallery	Group	Self service	2009	
Tel Aviv	Hachalalit Gallery	Group	Sex-sin	2010	
Tel Aviv	Hachalalit Gallery	Group	Statues	2013	
Tel Aviv	Hakibutz Gallery	Group	Desert Generation	2007	
Tel Aviv	Hamidrasha Gallery	Group	Side Effect	2003	
Tel Aviv	Haoman	Group	Passion	2007	
Tel Aviv	Hatachana	Group	Industry	2009	
Tel Aviv	HerzLilienblum Museum	Group	Israel Discount Bank Album No. 16.	2013	
Tel Aviv	Hilton Hotel	Group	Prologue	1999	
Tel Aviv	Inga Gallery	Group	Men	2009	
Tel Aviv	Inga Gallery	Solo	"Day and Night"	2010	
Tel Aviv	Inga Gallery	Solo	"Eye Contact"	2012	
Tel Aviv	Jaffa	Group	Three Chambers	2014	
Tel Aviv	Line 16 Gallery	Solo	"Decent Swinishness"	2000	
Tel Aviv	Line 16 Gallery	Group	Utility Furniture	2001	
Tel Aviv	Nehama Gallery	Group	Winter dreamers	1997	
Tel Aviv	Photography Festival	Group	Black Box	2012	
Tel Aviv	Port-house gallery	Group	Mama's Boy	2008	
Tel Aviv	Riding Power Station	Group	Omanut Haaretz festival	2005	
Tel Aviv	Rosenfled Gallery	Group	Power of Attraction	2014	
Tel Aviv	Sadnaot Haomanim Gallery	Group	Non stop art	2004	
Tel Aviv	Sadnaot Haomanim Gallery	Solo	""Dark Ages"	2005	
Tel Aviv	Shpilman Institute of Photography	Group	The Double Exposure Project (Curators: Aya Lurie, Orit Bulgaru, and Anat Ascher)	2014	
Tel Aviv	Sotheby's	Group	Emerging Artists	1999	
Tel Aviv	Spaceship at Hayarkon 70	Group	The Beauty of Mistake	2011	
Tel Aviv	Spaceship at Hayarkon 70	Group	Objects (Curator: Daniel Tsal)	2012	
Tel Aviv	Spaceship at Hayarkon 70	Group	Camera obscura (Curator: Hila Cohen Schneiderman)	2012	
Tel Aviv	Tavi Art Gallery	Group	Relocation	2010	
Tel Aviv	Tel Aviv Artists House	Group	My Beloved Pornography	2007	
Tel Aviv	Tel Aviv Artists House	Group	Public Garden	2007	
Tel Aviv	Tel Aviv Artists House	Group	Ethics - Esthetics	2009	
Tel Aviv	Tel Aviv Artists House	Group	Human Landscape	2011	
Tel Aviv	Tel Aviv Artists House	Group	A Piece of Cake	2011	
Tel Aviv	Tel Aviv Museum of Art	Group	Rose ce'st la vie	2004	
Tel Aviv	Tel Aviv Museum of Art	Group	Living Room	2010	
Tel Aviv	Tel Aviv Museum of Art	Solo	"Selective Mutism"	2011	
Tel Aviv	Tmuna gallery	Group	It is Not Israeli Art	2007	
Tel Aviv	Tmuna gallery	Group	The Secret Viewer	2008	
Tel Aviv	Zaritisky Artists' House	Group	Remembering Boaz Tal (Curator: Sorin Heller)	2012	
Tel Aviv	Zaritisky Artists' House	Group	Local Pulse (Curators: Orly Hoffman and Arie Berkovich)	2013	
Tel Aviv	Ziz Art Space	Group	Ziz Prints	2014	
Yad Mordechai	Dana Gallery	Group	Different Place (Curator: Ravit Harari)	2012	

=== Worldwide ===
Country	City	Venue	Type	Collection/Installation	Year(s)	Ref
Brazil	Rio de Janeiro	Photorial Festival	Group	City Space	2007	
England	London	The Gallery Soho	Group	Freedom of Expression - True Colors	2011	
England	London	100 Years Gallery	Group	The First Day	2013	
England	Manchester	The CUBE Gallery	Group	Freedom of Expression - True Colors	2011	
France	Marseille	Marseille Art Centre	Group	Marshim	2004	
Germany	Berlin	Artneuland Gallery	Group	Portraits	2007	
Germany	Berlin	Axel Springer	Solo	"Yad"	2007	
Germany	Berlin	Volume Gallery	Solo	"Publish"	2013	
Germany	Düsseldorf	Galerie Voss	Group	Lost Scapes	2015	
Russia	Moscow	Moscow Contemporary Art Center Winzavod	Group	Calm Before the Storm	2010	
Switzerland	Bellinzona	MACT/CACT Museum and Centre for Contemporary Art	Group	Deep Inside. Dissociations (Curator: Mario Casanova)	2012	
Switzerland	Bellinzona	MACT/CACT Museum and Centre for Contemporary Art	Group	The Solitary Body: Self-Portraiture in Contemporary Photography	2013	
United States	New York City	Cooper Union	Group	Chosen graduates	1997	

== Curatorial projects ==
- 2010 Sofia, Solo Exhibition of Bianca Eshel Gershuni, Inga gallery, Tel Aviv
- 2011 Hatima Tova, Group Exhibition, Inga gallery, Tel Aviv
- 2012 Incident Light, solo exhibition of Sasha Flit, Indie Gallery
- 2013 Big Yekatherina, solo exhibition of Valery Bikovsky, part of the exhibition Art's Outer Circles, Haifa Museum of Art
- 2014 Horror Movie, group exhibition, the International Photography Festival, Rishon LeZion
- 2014 Nehushtan, group exhibition, Chelouche Gallery, Tel Aviv

== Awards ==
- 1995 - Special presidential grant for excellence, Bezalel Academy of Art and Design, Jerusalem
- 2000 - Minister of education and culture award for young Israeli artist
- 2005 - Young photographers award on behalf of Haifa Museum of Art
- 2007 - Heskia Hacmun award
- 2012 - Israel's Minister of Culture ‘Art Encouragement’ Award

== Gallery ==
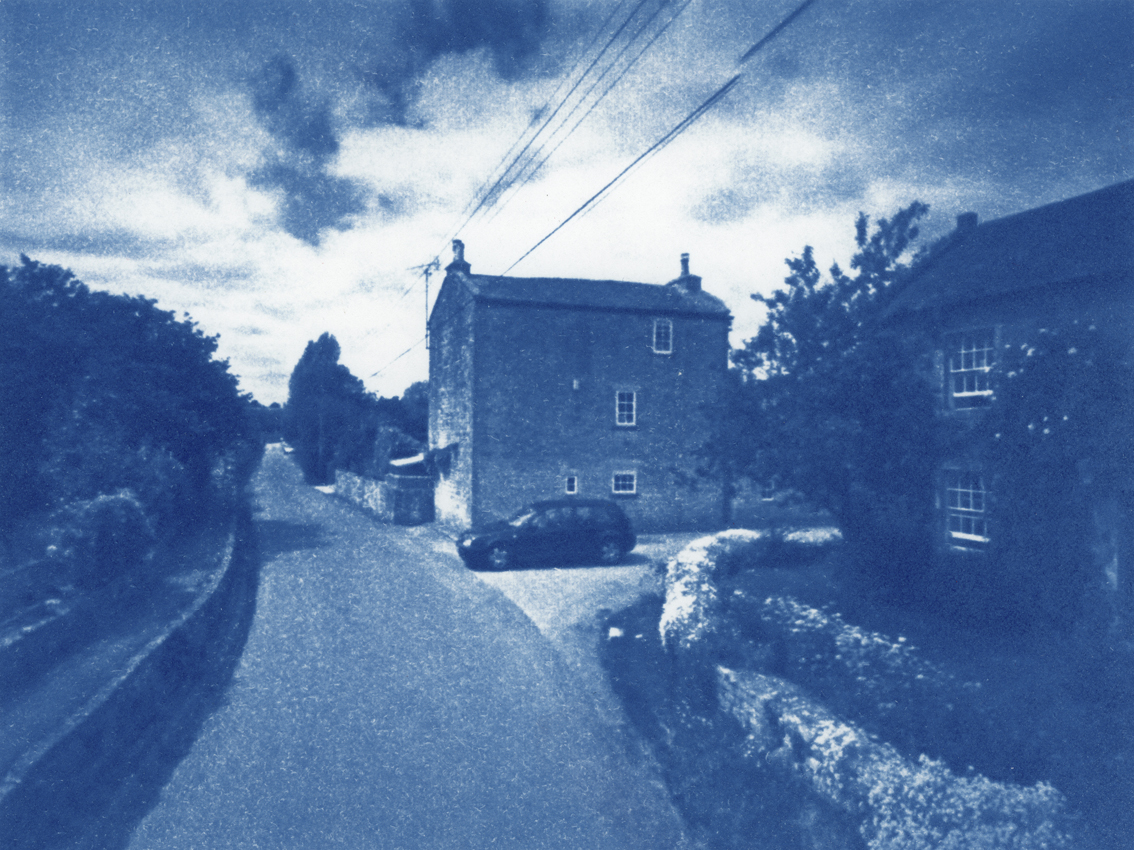
Blue Hour 2014

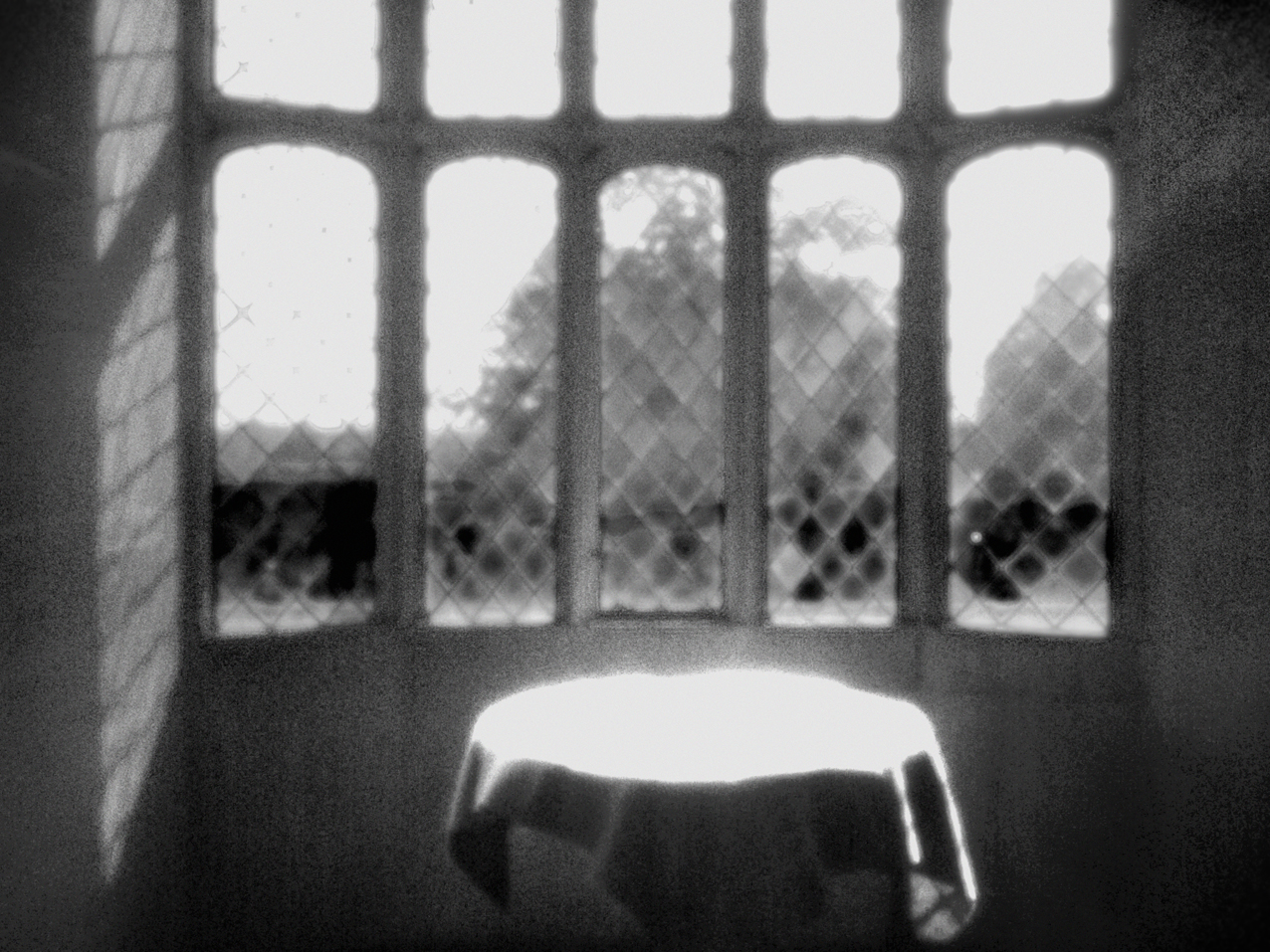
2010

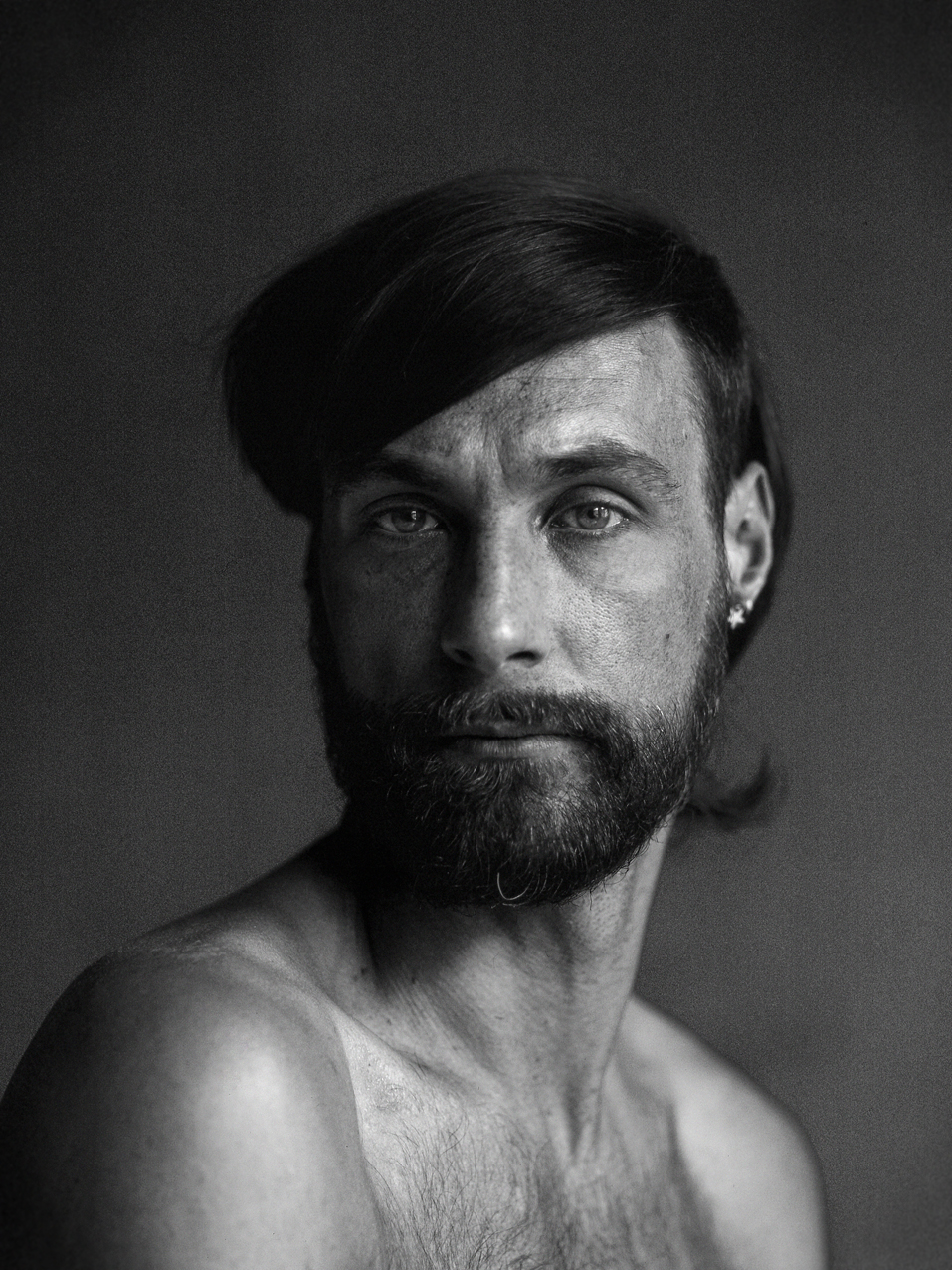
2009
