= Sharon Yaari =

Israeli photographer (born 1966)

Sharon Yaari שרון יערי
- Born: 1966 (age 59–60); Israel
- Education: Bezalel Academy of Art and Design,
- Known for: Photography
- Movement: Israeli art, modern art
- Website: https://sharonyaari.com/

Sharon Yaari (Hebrew: שרון יערי; born 1966) is an Israeli photographer.

== Biography ==
Sharon Yaari is an Israeli photographer and educator, mostly known for his landscapes, made using traditional film photography technic.

Yaari graduated with BFA from Bezalel Academy of Art and Design in 1994. He received Master of Philosophy from Faculty of Art Design and Technology of Derby University in 2002.

Sharon Yaari teaches in Bezalel Academy of Arts and Design, serving as senior lecturer at the Photography Department from 1994 and senior lecturer of master's degree program from 2002. He is also a lecturer at the Art Department, Faculty of Humanities in Haifa University since 2000.

Yaari's works are in following permanent public collections: Israel Museum, Tel Aviv Museum of Art, The Jewish Museum, Harvard University, The Schwartz Art Collection, Boston Business School, Herzliya Museum of Contemporary Art, Ella Fontanalls de Cisneros Collection, Progressive Collection, Ohio, Mishkenot Sha’ananim, Jerusalem.

== Exhibitions ==
=== Solo ===
- 1996 Boxes in the Garden, Camera Obscura Gallery, Tel Aviv
- 1999 Color Works, Herzliya Museum of Contemporary Art, Herzlyia
- 2000 Sommer Contemporary Art Gallery, Tel Aviv
- 2001 Last Year, Lombard/Freid Fine Art, New York
- 2002 Lisson Gallery, London
- 2002 Drexler University Art Gallery, Philadelphia USA
- 2002 Project Room Arco, Madrid, Spain
- 2002 Sommer Contemporary Art Gallery, Tel Aviv
- 2003 Dust, Lombard/Freid Fine Art, New York
- 2006 Hope for long distance photography, Tel Aviv Museum of Art
- 2009 Jerusalem Blvd. Sommer Contemporary Art. Tel Aviv
- 2009 Galerie Martin Janda, Vienna Austria
- 2011 Kunsthaus Baselland, Basel, Switzerland
- 2012 Expectancy, Galleria Martim Janda, Vienna, Austria
- 2013 Leap Toward Yourself, Tel Aviv Museum of Art
- 2014 Andrea Meislin Gallery, New York
- 2016 National Gallery of Art, Vilnius, Iris hermona was included as part of his "Red Slide" series (2015).

=== Group ===
- 1996 Machines for Living :Architecture of Visibility, Columns House, Tel Aviv
- 1997 Sight Seeing – A Topographical Reading: 19th Century British Photography from the Holyland / Contemporary Israeli Photography, Camera Obscura Gallery.
- 1997 Tel Aviv; Department of Photography Gallery, Bezalel Academy of Art and Design, Jerusalem
- 1998 Condition Report, Photography in Israel Today, Israel Museum, Jerusalem
- 1998 Habitation, Herzlyia Museum of Art
- 1999 Surveying the Landscape, Lombard/Freid Fine Art, New York
- 2000 Contemporary Landscape, traveling exhibition, MOCA, Roskilde, Denmark & Trondheim Kunstferning, Oslo, Norway LISTE 2000, Basel, Switzerland
- 2001 Aspiration, RIFFE Gallery, Columbus, Ohio and Buenos Aires
- 2002 Fragile Line, Um El Pahem Gallery
- 2002 Multitude Artists Space, New York
- 2002 Anthony Wilkinson Gallery, London
- 2003 Stranger-The 1st Triennial of Photography, ICP, New-York
- 2003 Fabula National Museum of Photography, Film & Television, Bradford, England
- 2004 A Point Of View, Tel Aviv Museum of Art
- 2004 Ashdod Museum of Art, Ashdod
- 2004 Behind Faces, Galerie Martin Janda Vienna
- 2005 Beyond Delirious Architecture: Selected Photographs from the Ella Fontanels Cisneros Collection, Miami, FL
- 2005 Such Stuff As Dream Are Made On Chelsea Art Museum, NY
- 2005 The New Hebrews, Martin Gropius Bau Museum, Berlin
- 2006 OMAUT. arte in Israele 1900–2006 Milano, Palazzo Reale, Italy
- 2006 Art of Living: Contemporary Photography and Video from the Israel Museum, The Contemporary Jewish Museum San Francisco USA
- 2007 Dateline Israel: New Photography and Video Art, The Jewish Museum, New York and Jewish Museum Berlin
- 2007 Engagement, Israeli Photography Now. The Israel Museum, Jerusalem
- 2007 Inside-Out, Contemporary Artists from Israel, MARCO – Museum of contemporary Art, Vigo, Spain.
- 2007 Omanut Haaretz, Tel Aviv Old Port
- 2007 The invisible snake show, Sommer Contemporary Art, Tel Aviv
- 2008 Can Art Do More? Art Focus 5, 2008, Pavilion, Jerusalem
- 2008 Depletion, Tel Aviv Museum of Art
- 2008 Eventually We'll Die – Young Art in Israel of the Nineties, Herzliya Museum of Contemporary Art
- 2008 Personal Landscapes: Contemporary Art from Israel, The American University Museum Washington
- 2008 Real Time: Art in Israel 1998–2008, the Israel Museum, Jerusalem
- 2009 Art Tlv 09- The Tel Aviv Biennial, Universal Circus – City Performances
- 2009 Boule to Braid, Lisson Gallery, London
- 2009 Time Tel Aviv, Tel Aviv Museum of Art
- 2010 What is the Political, Museum of Bat Yam, Israel
- 2010 Entanglment, Bezalel Academy Gallery, Tel Aviv
- 2010 In Detail, Haifa Museum of Art
- 2010 Looking In, Looking Out: The Window in Art, Israel Museum, Jerusalem.
- 2010 Photographs in conjunction with Traces IV – The Biennale for Drawing in Israel, Ticho House, Israel Museum, Jerusalem.
- 2010 Shelf Life, Haifa Museum of Art, Haifa
- 2010 The Ministry of Culture and Sport's 2009 Awards for Art and Design, Herzelia Museum
- 2011 A Road to Nowhere, Ashdod Museum of Art
- 2011 Southern Spirits – Aspects of the Negev in Contemporary Israel Art, The Negev Museum of Art, Beer Sheva
- 2012 Silverstein Annual, Bruce Silverstein gallery, New York City
- 2012 DB12 Volume 1 – The Dallas Biennial, Dick Higgins Gallery, Dallas USA
- 2012 Good Night, Israel Museum, Jerusalem
- 2012 The city, The Center for Contemporary Art, Tel Aviv
- 2012 The Compromised Land: Recent Photography and Video from Israel, Neuberger Museum, Purchase, New York
- 2013 Collecting Dust in Contemporary Israeli Art, Israel Museum, Jerusalem
- 2014 Journeys, Israel Museum, Jerusalem

== Awards ==
- 1996 America-Israel Cultural Foundation Award
- 1997 Young Artist Prize, Ministry of Education and Culture
- 1999 Gerard Levi Price, Young Photographer's Price, Israel Museum
- 2000 Recipient of the 2000 Minister of Culture and Science Prize, Israel
- 2004 Janet Gaphin Award, America-Israel Cultural Foundation
- 2005 The Nathan Gottesdiener Foundation Israeli Art Prize
- 2009 Creative Encouragement Award, Culture and Sport Ministry
- 2010 Constantiner Photography Award, Tel Aviv Museum of Art
