= Ella Littwitz =

Israeli artist (born 1982)

Ella Littwitz 'אלה ליטוויץ
- Born: 1982 (age 43–44); Israel
- Education: Bezalel Academy of Art and Design

Ella Littwitz (Hebrew: 'אלה ליטוויץ; born 1982) is an Israeli artist, living and working in Jaffa, Israel. Littwitz is a laureate of the HISK- Higher Institute for Fine Arts in Ghent (BE) in 2015 and received her BFA from Bezalel Academy of Art and Design (Jerusalem, IL) in 2009.

== Exhibitions ==
=== Solo ===
- 2024: Ontology of the Void, Alexander Levy Gallery, Berlin, Germany
- 2024: For Chaos They Yearn, curated by Dr. Kobi Ben Meir, Haifa Museum of Art, Israel
- 2024:The Day The Sky Hung Low, Harlan Levey Projects, Brussels, Belgium
- 2023: Axis Mundi, curated by Giulia Monroy, Una Boccata d’Arte, Pollina, Sicily, IT
- 2023: Red Mercury, curated by Christin Müller and Felix Ruhöfer, Basis, Frankfurt. Germany
- 2022: Correnti I - Animalia, Duo with Elena Mazzi, curated by Giulia Bortoluzzi, RITA URSO artopiagallery, Milan, Italy
- 2022: If Everything That Exists Has A Place, Place Too Will Have A Place, Copperfield Gallery, London, UK
- 2021: If Everything That Exists Has A Place, curated by Agata Ciastoń, SIC! BWA, Wrocław, Poland
- 2021: Pillar of Salt, Alexander Levy Gallery, Berlin, Germany
- 2021: A High Degree of Certainty, curated by Sergio Edelsztein, CCA Tel Aviv, Israel
- 2019: Facts on the Ground, Alexander Levy Gallery, Berlin, Germany
- 2019: The Promise, Kunsthalle St. Gallen, curated by Maren Brauner, Switzerland
- 2019: The Elephant in the Room, curated by Oriol Fontdevila, La Panera Art Center, Lleida, Spain
- 2018: And Waters Became Wormwood, curated by Agata Ciastoń, MWW Muzeum Współczesne Wrocław, Poland
- 2018: “And a third of the waters became wormwood”, Harlan Levey Projects, Brussels, Belgium
- 2017: Kwisatz Haderach, Curated by Drorit Gur Arie and Or Tshuva, Petach Tikva Museum of Art, Israel
- 2017: No Vestige of a Beginning, No Prospect of an End, Copperfield Gallery, London, UK
- 2017: Migration - Itchy Sharkia, curated by Irit Tal, The Tel Aviv University Art Gallery, Tel Aviv, Israel
- 2017: Everybody Knows That the Boat is Leaking, Galeria Silvestre, Madrid, Spain
- 2016: Divisi, Duo with Benjamin Verhoeven, De Bijloke, Gent, Belgium
- 2016: Tomograma, Salzburger Kunstverein, Curated by Seamus Kealy, Salzburg, Austria
- 2016: Dionysius' Ear, Duo with Klaas Vanhee, Galeria Silvestre, Tarragona, Spain
- 2015: Hedgehogs see everything in yellow, Galeria silvestre, Madrid, Spain
- 2015: Monolith, Galeria silvestre, Tarragona, Spain
- 2014: The Most Promising Artist Award Exhibition, Fresh paint 7, Tel aviv, Israel, curated by Matan Daube
- 2012: Sirius, Tivon gallery, Israel, curated by Taly Cohen-Garbuz

=== Group ===
- 2024: A Botanical Conversation, Harlan Levey Projects, Brussels, Belgium
- 2024: ASÍ QUE PASEN DIEZ AÑOS, Galeria Silvestre, Madrid, Spain
- 2024: Believe, Curated by Rinat Edelstein, Manofim Festival, Jerusalem
- 2024:Botanique des imaginaires, curated by Jonathan Pouthier and Inès Vásquez Messano, Exposition co-organisée par la Ville d'Auxerre et le Centre Pompidou, Abbaye Saint-Germain, Auxerre, France
- 2024: The wilderness and the dry land shall be glad; and the desert shall rejoice, and blossom as the rose, curated by Hila Cohen-Schneiderman, The School of Visual Theater Gallery, Jerusalem, Israel
- 2024: On a Silver Platter: Artists to Benefit CCA, CCA Tel Aviv, Israel
- 2024: What Are You Facing? Curated by Avital Barak, The Israeli Center for Digital Art, Holon, Israel
- 2024: Sounds Like a Whisper (Poetically Political), co-curated by Galina Dimitrova and Ariel Reichman, Sofia City Art Gallery, Bulgaria
- 2024: Heavy Water | of Coordinates, Containers and Containment, curated by Jessica Edwards, Alexander Levy Gallery, Berlin, Germany
- 2023: To Sing from the Broken Branch, curated by Shira Friedman, Zuzu Gallery, Israel
- 2023: WADI, curated by Dan Handel, Haifa Museum of Art, Israel
- 2023: Substrate, curated by Tamar Margalit, CCA Tel Aviv, Israel
- 2023: Rewilding, curated by graduators of Yona Fisher program for contemporary curation studies and museology, Jaffa Museum, Israel
- 2023: Who by Fire, Liav Mizrahi (Tel Aviv) in dialogue with Dr. Marc Wellmann, Haus am Lützowplatz, Berlin, Germany
- 2023: In This Earth, In This Soil, Curated by Savvanah Gorton, Artport, Tel Aviv, Israel
- 2023: Rooms of Resonance, Curated by Benedicte Goesaert and Chantal Pattyn, Cloud Seven, Brussels, Belgium
- 2023: What’s new? The collection is expanding: a selection of acquisitions of 2019 to 2022, Curated by Mirjam Varadinis, Kunsthaus Zürich, Switzerland
- 2023: METANOIA, Galeria Silvestre, Madrid, Spain
- 2023: The Unexpected Universe: Traces of the Anthropocene, Alexander Levy Gallery, Berlin, Germany
- 2022: Statecraft, curated by Katerina Gregos, National Museum of Contemporary Art (EMST), Athens, Greece
- 2022: Soil to Soil, curated by Irene Grillo, Altefabrik, Rapperswil, Switzerland
- 2022: Politics in Art, Curated by Maria Anna Potocka, Agnieszka Sachar and Martyna Sobczyk, MOCAK, Krakow, Poland
- 2022: A Place for the Affections: Dwelling in Anguish (Torment) and Love, co-curated with DJ Hellerman, Harlan Levey Projects 1080, Brussels, BE
- 2022: Locus Solus, curated by Selen Ansen, Arter, Istanbul, Turkey
- 2022: Material Imagination: Israeli Art from the Museum’s Collection, curated by Dalit Matatyahu. Assistant Curators: Tal Broitman, Adi Gross, Adi Dahan, Amit Shemma, Tel Aviv Museum of Arts, Israel
- 2021: Inaspettatamente, Co curated by Gregory Lang and Frédéric de Goldschmid, Cloud Seven, Brussles, Belgium
- 2021: Digging Down; Art Of The Pre-Future, curated by Shira Friedman, Bible Lands Museum, Jerusalem, Israel
- 2021: Talking To The Wall, curated by Dan Orimian, The Cube, Jerusalem, Israel
- 2021: Water Affairs, curated by Udi Edelman and Avital Barak, The Israeli Center for Digital Art, Holon, Israel
- 2021: Frequently The Woods Are Pink, Be-Part, Waregem, Belgium
- 2021: How Long Is Now, curated by Orly Rabi, The Israel Museum, Jerusalem, Israel
- 2021: K60, with Alexander Levy, Wilhelm Hallen, Berlin, Germany
- 2021: Tree Analysis, curated by Cornelia Saalfrank, Spiegelarche, Roldisleben, Thüringen, Germany
- 2021: Groundwater, curated by Ravit Harari, Ramat Hasharon Gallery, Israel
- 2021: DACH – Uit de Collectie van S.M.A.K., Kunstencentrum Ten Bogaerde, Koksijde, BE
- 2020: 6 Degrees, Liebaert Projects, with Harlan Levey Projects, Kortrijk, Belgium
- 2020: Bluets, co-curated by Stephanie Cristello and Ruslana Lichtzier, Exhibition Weekend by Expo Chicago
- 2020: "The Effects of Crossing & Self-Aggrandization in the Human Kingdom" curated by Scrum (Séamus Kealy & Tilo Schulz) Mario Mauroner contemporary art Vienna, Austria
- 2020: Back to nature, curated by Hadas Maor, The Botanical Gardens, Jerusalem, Israel
- 2020: Nonfinito, curated by Vardit Gross, Artport, Tel Aviv, Israel
- 2020: Accrochage, Alexander Levy Gallery, Berlin, Germany
- 2020: Presence in the Absence, Alexander Levy Gallery, Berlin, Germany
- 2019: Futur, curated by Michael Hiltbrunner, Casa d’Angel, Lumbrein, Switzerland
- 2019: Ax Bear Crow, curated by Vardit Gross, Artport, Tel Aviv, Israel
- 2019: Anecdotes on Origin, A plus A Gallery, Venice, Italy
- 2019: Buffer Zones, curated by Nat Pitt, Paradise Works, Manchester, UK
- 2019: Real Beauty, curated by Oriol Fontdevila, ADN Platform, Barcelona, Spain
- 2019: Colectiva V años, Galería Silvestre, Madrid
- 2019: The Lid, curated by Netta Laufer, Almacén Gallery, Yafo, Israel
- 2019: The Production Of Space, II, curated by Felix Fasolt and Guy Slabbnick, Gent, Belgium
- 2019: Photo Album, curated by David Adika, Yael Efrati and Rami Maymon, Braverman Gallery, Tel Aviv, Israel
- 2019: Non Non Fiction, curated by Moran Sulmirski Noam and Dvir Shaked, Emuna College, Jerusalem, Israel
- 2019: Seeds of the Land, curated by Tami Manor Friedman, Ticho House - The Israel Museum, Jerusalem, Israel
- 2019: Flowers of Our Land, curated by Udi Edelman, The Israeli Center for Digital Art, Holon, Israel
- 2018: The Dangerous Professors, curated by Ruslana Lichtzier, Flatland Gallery, Houston, Texas
- 2018: Je me demande pourquoi plus de fleurs n’ont pas d’épines, Une proposition curatoriale de Roman Moriceau, V2VINGT, Brussels
- 2018: Mystic Properties, curated by Elena Sorokina, Art Brussels, Brussels
- 2018: "The State is not a Work of Art", curated by Katerina Gregos, Tallinn Art Hall, Estonia
- 2017: What Goes Around Comes Around, curated by Shira Friedman, Neve Schechter Gallery, Tel Aviv, Israel
- 2017: 10th edition of LA BIENNAL D'ART LEANDRE CRISTÒFOL, curated by Cèlia del Diego, Oriol Fontdevila, and Javier Hontoria, Centre d'Art La Panera, Lleida, Spain
- 2017; ARCANA IMPERII. Art Research on Bureaucracy, curated by Oriol Fontdevila, Centre del Carme Cultura Contemporània. València, Spain
- 2017: Lives Between, curated by Sergio Edelsztein and Joseph del Pesco, CCA Tel Aviv, Israel
- 2017: "Lenta venganza de lo inmóvil", La gran gallery, Valladolid, Spain
- 2017: WE HAVE THE WEIGHTS, WE HAVE THE MEASURES, Copperfield Gallery, London, UK
- 2017: Euphoria project: 1967 Turns 50: Wartime Art, Curated by Dana Arieli, Mishkan Museum of Art, Ein Harod, Israel
- 2017: Antwerp Art Weekend with Harlan Levey projects, Antwerp, Belgium
- 2017: Mementos, curated by Jens Hoffmann and Piper Marshall, Art Brussels flag show 2017, Belgium
- 2017: SAMPLE, curated by Humberto Moro, Zona Maco with Harlan Levey projects, Mexico City, Mexico
- 2016:"Mother, I have reached the land of my dreams", curated by Alona Harpaz and Sharon Horodi, ID Festival Berlin 2016 With CIRCLE1, Berlin, Germany
- 2016: Fragmented Time, curated by Rachel Monosov, Catinca Tabacaru Gallery, NYC, NY
- 2016: Regard partagés. d'Ensor à Tuymans: coup d'oeil sur une collection privée, curated by Hans Martens, Marthe Donas Museum, Ittre, Belgium
- 2016: Do You Speak Synergy? curated by Denis Maksimov, Harlan Levey Projects, Brussels, Belgium
- 2015: It takes two to make an accident, Curated by Selen Ansen, HISK laureates 2015, Gent, Belgium
- 2015: Freitag, der 13. // יום שישי ה -13, Curated by Hannah Beck-Mannagetta, Circle 1, Berlin, Germany
- 2015: And no matter that the phone is ringing, curated by Oleg Matrokhin, co-curator Elena Kuprina-Lyakhovich, CCI Fabrika, 6th Moscow Biennale, Special Program, Russia
- 2015: Solid, Tivon gallery, Israel, curated by Taly Cohen-Garbuz
- 2015: Gatherer / Nonfunctional Display, Jerusalem Artists’ house, Israel, curated by Tali Ben-Nun
- 2014: Back to Berlin, Re-view, [Herzliya Museum of Contemporary Art, Israel| curated by Dr. Aya Lurie, Tal Bechler, Ghila Limon
- 2014: ITINERARIOS, XX Becas de Artes Plásticas, Santander, Spain
- 2014: The International Photography Festival, curated by Assaf Shaham, Israel
- 2012: NO OK, Stadtbad Oderberger, Berlin, Germany
- 2012: Cabinets of Wonder in Contemporary Art – From Astonishment to Disenchantment, Herzliya Museum of Contemporary Art, Israel | curated by D. Levin, G. Limon, D. Kaufmann
- 2012: Der Zweite Blick, curated by Susanne Hinrichs, Berlin Jüdisches Gemeindehaus Gallery, Germany
- 2011: 12th Istanbul Biennial, Turkey. Curated by Adriano Pedrosa & Jens Hoffmann
- 2011: Beauty, curated by Roi Kuper, Florentin 45 Gallery, Tel Aviv, Israel
- 2011: METAKOM … yet the sea is not full…, a Schir project: Kunstverein Kreis Gütersloh/ Raumordnung, Gesellschaft für urbane Kunst und Gestaltung, Krefeld/ Kunstverein Kreis Soest, Soest, Germany
- 2011: Terror: Artists Respond, curated by C. Evans & Y. Verwer, Industry City Gallery, Brooklyn, NY
- 2010: Selected Graduated from fine arts Academies, Tel Hai Museum, Israel
- 2010: HomeBase V, Berlin, Germany
- 2010: 100 JAHRE JUNG, UDK, Berlin, Germany
- 2009: 100 Years of Dialogue through Art, curated by Yona Fischer, Orangerie du Senate, Luxembourg Gardens, Paris, France
- 2009: David and the Girls, curated by David Adika, POV: The Israeli Photography Festival, Tel-Aviv, Israel

== Awards and residences ==
- 2008–2010: Sharett Scholarship Program, America – Israel Cultural Foundation, Israel.
- 2009: Mitchell Presser Excellence award granted by Bezalel Academy of Art and Design, Jerusalem, Israel.
- 2009: Excellence scholarship granted by Rea Ben David, Photography House, Tel Aviv, Israel.
- 2010: HomeBase V, Berlin, Germany.
- 2012: Arbeitsstipendium Stiftung Kunstfonds, Bonn, Germany.
- 2012–2013: The Botín Foundation grant, Santander, Spain
- 2013: The Igal Ahouvi Art Collection Promising Artist Award. Israel
- 2017: The Lottery Grant, Israel
- 2018: The Lottery Grant, Israel
- 2018: Dr. Georg and Josi Guggenheim foundation prize, Zurich, Switzerland
- 2018: Outset Studiomakers, Israel
- 2019: Artport Tel Aviv
- 2019: Guggenheim Stiftung exhibition support
- 2019: Artis exhibition grant
- 2020: Artis Grant for Exceptional Work in Uncertain Times
- 2022: The Ministry Of Culture - Creative Encouragement Award
- 2022: Rabinovich Foundation for the Arts Support
- 2023: Plumas art Foundation
