= Sheffy Bleier =

Israeli photographer and educator

Sheffy Bleier שפי בלייר
- Born: 1964 (age 61–62); Tel Aviv, Israel
- Education: Tel Aviv University, Beit Berl College, Open University of Israel
- Known for: Photography
- Movement: Israeli art, Modern Art

Sheffy Bleier (Hebrew: שפי בלייר) is an Israeli photographer and educator.

== Biography ==
Sheffy Bleier is an Israeli photographer and visual artist, mostly known for her provocative still life images primarily made of animal parts. Some of her works also research human relationships and motherhood, for example, the series "What remains" in which she exhibited images of still life objects related to her son Jonathan's early years.

Bleier was born and raised in Tel Aviv where she continues to work. In addition to being an artist, she is an educator, teaching at the HaMidrasha School of Art, Beit Berl College from 2001.

Bleier's works are in permanent collections of the Israel Museum in Jerusalem, the Haifa Museum of Art, the Museum of Israeli Art in Ramat Gan and the Open Museum of Photography in Tel Hai.

== Exhibitions ==
She has exhibited her works at many solo and group shows around the world and in Israel.

=== Solo ===
- 1995 "Photographs 1994," Limbus Gallery, Tel Aviv
- 1997 "My Mother and Father, My Brother, My Sister, My Little Sister, Me, My Husband, and My Son..." The Museum of Israeli Art, Ramat Gan
- 1999 "Bras, Pillows, and Used Condoms (Emotional Substitutes)," Limbus Gallery, Tel Aviv
- 2000 "Fooling Saucer" Haifa Museum of Art
- 2005 "My Mother and Father, My Brother, My Sister, My Little Sister, Me and My Son...", Herzliya Museum of Contemporary Art
- 2009-2010 "Body of Love", Open Museum of Photography, Tel Hai

=== Group ===
- "Meat After Meat Joy", Daneyal Mahmood Gallery, New York, 2008
- "Cabinet of curiosities". Herzliya Museum of Contemporary Art, 2012

== Awards ==
- 1989 Sharet Scholarship Program, America-Israel Cultural Foundation
- 1997 Creativity Encouragement Prize for the Visual Arts, Department of Visual Art, The Council of Culture and Arts, Israeli Ministry of Education and Culture
- 2009 The Yehoshua Rabinovich Foundation for the Arts
- 2010 The Israel Lottery Council for The Arts Prize
