= Shpilman International Prize for Excellence in Photography =

Shpilman International Prize for Excellence in Photography SIPEP
- Awarded for: Outstanding contributions for field of photography as contemporary art.
- Country: Israel
- Presented by: Israel Museum; Shpilman Institute of Photography; Shpilman family
- First award: 2010; 16 years ago
- No. of laureates: 5 Prizes to 5 Laureates as of 2016
- Website: www.imj.org.il/shpilmanprize/

The Shpilman International Prize for Excellence in Photography is an international bi-yearly photography prize awarded by Israel Museum in Jerusalem.

== History ==
The Shpilman International Prize for Excellence in Photography was created by Shalom Shpilman in 2010 and was awarded once a year. After the Shpilman Institute of Photography was closed in 2013, the Shpilman family endowed the Israel Museum in Jerusalem to award the prize every two years. The goal of the prize is to award individuals who work in photography. The prize money is 45000 USD. The decision is made based on review by an international jury of five jurors, appointed by Israel Museum. Candidates are nominated by art professionals, working with Israel Museum.

== Winners ==
year	winner	theme	honorable mentions	jury members
2010	Michal Heiman	Contribution of art to psychoanalysis, and vice versa.		Nissan N. Perez, Peter Galassi, Shlomo Lee Abrahmov (on behalf of Shpilman family), Marta Gili, Hanan Laskin
2011	Assaf Shaham			
2012	John Jacob	Reliquum: That Which Remains	Adam Broomberg and Oliver Chanarin, Katia Mazzucco	Nissan N. Perez, Dana Arieli-Horowitz, Hanan Laskin, Bodo von Dewitz, Wilkes Tucker
2014	Lisa Oppenheim	Experimental photography deriving from original research in the social history of the medium		Monika Faber, Quentin Bajac, Ruth E. Iskin, Galit Eilat, Noam Gal
2016	Servet Koçyiğit	Localities	Marion Belanger, Richard Moss, David Adika, Alec Soth	Virginia Heckert, Sebastian Cichocki, Gal Ventura, Noam Gal
2018	Alison Rossiter			
2020	Sara Cwynar	Action	Penelope Umbrico, Lebohang Kganye	Selen Ansen, Martin Barnes, Anne Lacoste, Nicola Trezzi, Noam Gal
2022	Laia Abril		Ruth Patir, Widline Cadet	Thyago Nogueira, SunJung Kim, Walter Moser, Anat Saragusti, Gilad Reich, Tamara Abramovitch
