= Koçyiğit =

Koçyiğit is a Turkish surname. Notable people with the surname include:

- Hülya Koçyiğit (born 1947), Turkish actress
- Kseniya Koçyiğit
- Servet Koçyiğit
- Yağmur Koçyiğit (born 1988), Turkish volleyball player
