= Servet Koçyiğit =

Dutch visual artist

Servet Kocyigit (born 1971) is a Turkish-Dutch visual artist based in Amsterdam, Netherlands.

== Biography ==
Kocyigit was born in 1971 in Kaman, Turkey. He studied art at Gerrit Rietveld Academy, Amsterdam and currently lives and works between Amsterdam and Istanbul. He participated in several artist residency programs: De Ateliers Amsterdam, Holland (1999), Wilhelm Lehmbruck Residency Duisburg, Germany (2000), JCVA Jerusalem Center for the Visual Arts, Israel (2006), JoBurg Now, Johannesburg, South Africa (2016).

== Exhibitions ==
Koçyiğit work was exhibited internationally, including galleries, art institutions and museums in Holland, Turkey, France, Germany, Brazil, Israel, China and Italy. Servet Kocyigit's solo exhibitions includes those at Rampa Gallery in Istanbul, Officine Dell’Immagine in Milan, Outlet Independent Art Space in Istanbul, Givon Art Gallery in Tel Aviv, Netherlands Photo Museum in Rotterdam, Israel Museum, Herzliya Museum of Contemporary Art and Haifa Museum of Art among others.

He has participated in group exhibitions including, 27th São Paulo Biennale in Brazil, 9th Istanbul Biennale, Biennale Cuvée, Linz in Austria, De Kleine Biennale Utrecht in Holland, Centrum Kultury ZAMEK in Poznań, Istanbul Modern Turkey (2014), Castrum Peregrini Amsterdam, Netherlands (2014), Lianzhou Foto Festival, China (2012), HOK (Henie Onstad Kunstsenter) Oslo, Norway (2012), ARTER Space For Art, Istanbul (2010), TANAS Berlin (2011), Palais Des Beaux Arts De Lille, France (2009), Smart Project Space, Amsterdam (2008), Haifa Museum of Art Israel (2007), Israel Museum Jerusalem (2006), Herzliya Museum of Contemporary Art, Israel (2006), MuHKA- Media Antwerp, Belgium (2005), Proje 4L Istanbul Museum of Contemporary Art (2002), De Appel Center for Contemporary Art, Amsterdam (2001), Wilhelm Lehmbruck Museum Duisburg, Germany (2000).

=== Awards ===
Servet Koçyiğit received several grants and prizes, including Shpilman International Prize for Excellence in Photography 2016, awarded by Israel Museum in Jerusalem. He is a winner of "The New best photographer of the year" at Lianzhou Foto festival in 2012. He received OC&V scholarship from Dutch Ministry of Culture (1997), Wilhelm Lehmbruck Fellowship (1999), Residency Grant from Mondriaan Fonds (2016), Working Grant, FBKvB The Netherlands Foundation for Visual Arts (2008). He has been nominated for PrixPictet (2010) "Growth" and for The Fritschy Award (2006).
