= Herzliya Museum of Contemporary Art =

Coordinates: 32.1620°N 34.8436°E

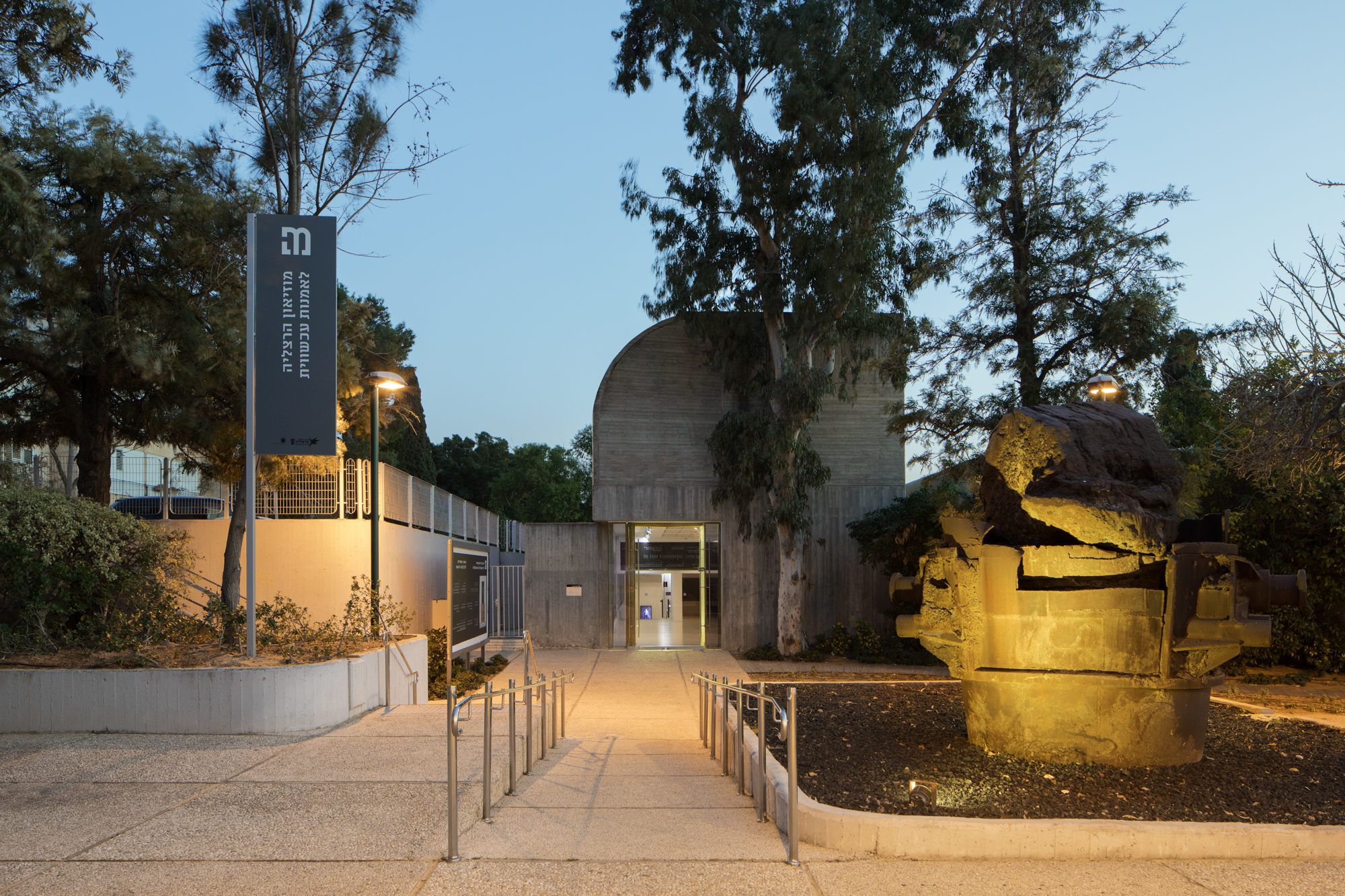
- Location: 4 Ha'banim St., Herzliya, 4637904
- Type: Contemporary art museum,
- Director: Dr. Aya Lurie
- Website: www.herzliyamuseum.co.il

The Herzliya Museum of Contemporary Art (Hebrew: מוזיאון הרצליה לאמנות) is contemporary art museum with a collection of over 1000 artworks. It curates four exhibitions each year.

== History ==
Established in 1965 in Herzeliya, Israel, the museum's main focus is Israeli and international contemporary art. The museum building was designed by Israel Prize laureate architect Yaakov Rechter.

The museum hosts painting, sculpture, video, installation, photography and architecture exhibitions, as well as video installations and digital media exhibitions.

It also has an educational program MUZA – A Place for Visual Experience. It holds different activities in the fields of video art and photography, including workshops and courses.

The Herzliya Museum of Contemporary Art is known for promotion of collaboration between Israeli and Palestinian artists by showing group exhibitions and organizing meetings and workshops for artists to work together. Herzliya Museum of Contemporary Art also exhibits art from different continents, showing works of artists acclaimed in their countries, yet not known well to the Western World.

== Collections ==
The museum began with a small collection of paintings, most of which were donated by Herzliya residents, led by co-founder Eugene da Villa, in the early 1960s, that were exhibited in its initial location, an apartment at 15 Bar Ilan Street. Its collection later comprised over one thousand works.

Works acquired by the museum include its:

- Jacob Alkow Collection
- Osias Hofstatter Collection
- Michael Adler Collection
- Yona Fischer Collection

== Exhibitions ==
Four exhibitions are staged by the museum annually. By 2022, it had staged over 850 exhibitions.

Artists exhibited at the museum include:

- David Adika
- Einat Arif-Galanti
- Ilit Azoulay
- Aziz + Cucher
- Sheffy Bleier
- Olaf Breuning
- Chien-Chi Chang
- Hou Chun-Ming
- Cliff Evans
- Parastou Forouhar
- Uri Gershuni
- Shachar Freddy Kislev
- Kendell Geers
- Miki Kratsman
- Ella Littwitz
- Uriel Miron
- Nira Pereg
- Alona Rodeh
- Hsieh Ying-chun
- Maya Zack

== See also ==
- List of museums in Israel
