= Assaf Shaham =

Israeli artist

- Born: אסף שחם; 1983 (age 42–43); Jerusalem
- Known for: photography
- Movement: contemporary art

Assaf Shaham (Hebrew: אסף שחם; born 1983) is an Israeli artist.

== Biography ==
Shaham was born in Jerusalem. He graduated from the Minshar School of Art in Tel Aviv in 2012. While still a student he was awarded the Shpilman International Prize for Excellence in Photography A year after his graduation he was awarded the Constantiner Photography Award for an Israeli Artist from Tel Aviv Museum of Art. Shaham studied at the Maumaus program in Lisbon and got his MFA from the University of Southern California. He divides his time between Tel Aviv and Los Angeles.

== Solo exhibitions ==
- 2012. The king is dead, long live the king!, Tempo Rubato Gallery.
- 2012. Assaf Shaham: New ways to steal old souls, Tel Aviv Museum of Art.
- 2014. The Vision of Division, Braverman Gallery, Tel Aviv.
- 2015. Division of the Vision, Yossi Milo Gallery, New York.

== Awards ==
- 2011. Shpilman International Prize for Excellence in Photography.
- 2012. The Constantiner Photography Award for and Israeli Artist.
- 2017. Winner of the Ministry of Culture and Sports Young Artist Prize.

== Collections ==
Shaham's works are held in the following public collection:

- Israel Museum, Jerusalem.
