= Hou Chun-Ming =

Taiwanese artist

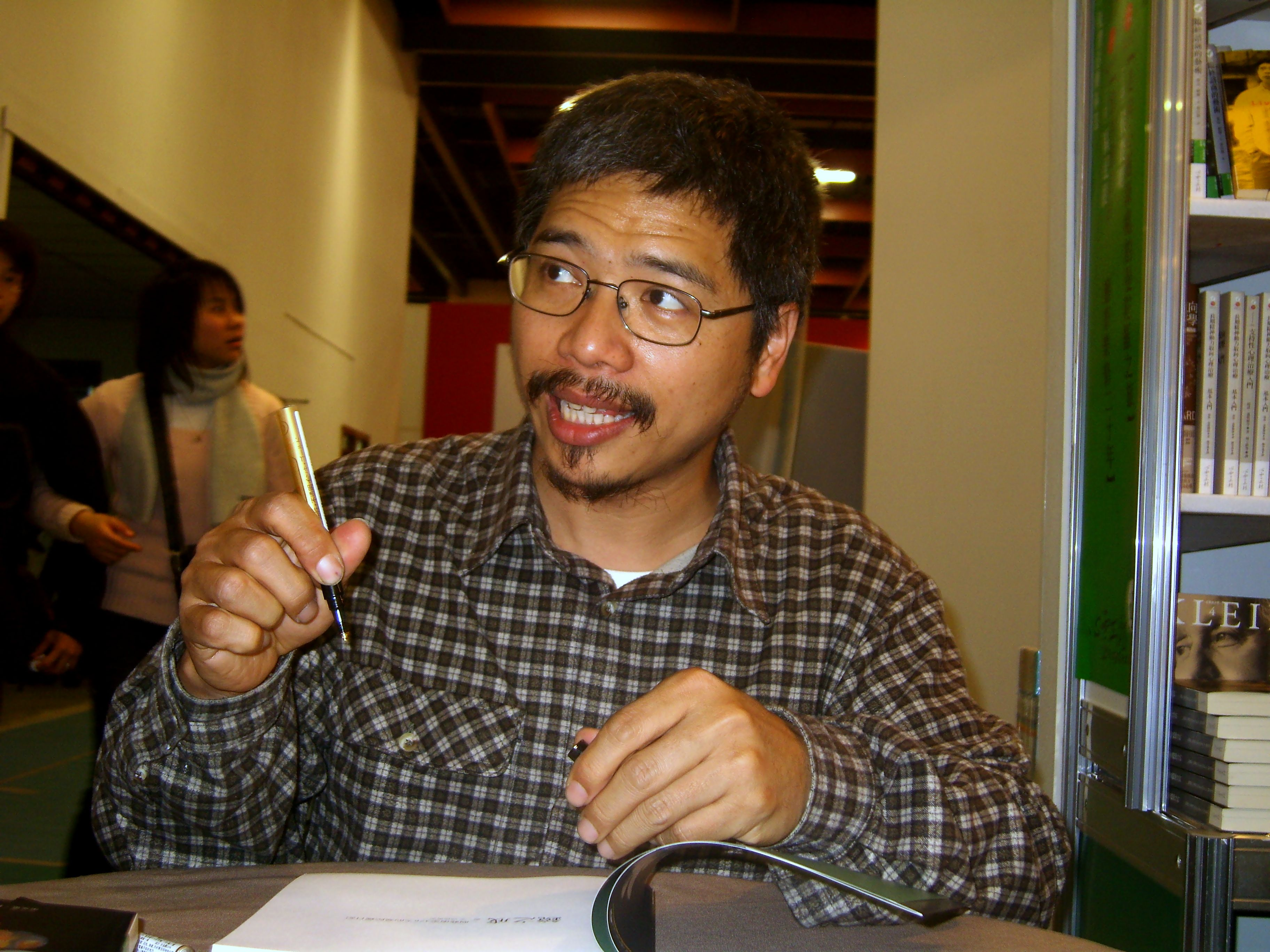
- Born: 1963 (age 62–63); Chiayi County, Taiwan
- Education: National College of Arts (Taipei National University of the Arts)
- Occupation: Contemporary Artists
- Writing career
- Years active: 1987–present

Hou Chun-Ming (traditional Chinese: 侯俊明) is a contemporary Taiwan artist from Chiayi County, Taiwan. After many years of relative obscurity as an artist, Hou Chun-Ming's quick ascent into the art world began in April 2007 when Hong Kong Sotheby's auctioned his graphic artwork Erotic Paradise. Although it was not considered a favorite, it nevertheless sold for $480,000 HKD, twelve times over the starting bid. New Paradise & God Hates You were each sold for over $1 million HKD and Anecdotes About Spirits and Immortals sold for a record $2.64 million HKD, the highest international auction price ever commanded by a contemporary Taiwan artist.

== Biography ==
Hou Chun-Ming was born on January 10, 1963, in Liuchiao Town, Jia Yi County in Taiwan. In 1982, he entered the Department of Fine Arts, National Art Academy and won the first prize in the National Oil Painting Exhibition in 1983.

After graduating from college in 1987, he became a prolific painter. In his representative painting of that era: The Intestine Sutra series, he attempted to magnify the conflict between “sex” and “folk lore” within his art.

In 1988, Hou's work Little Women was showcased at the Busan International Biennale in Korea. In 1990, Hou's Mythology & Desire Punishment were well received by critics. But what really shot him into the mainstream was Anecdotes about Spirits and Immortals. The title of Anecdotes about Spirits and Immortals was inspired by the name of Gan Bao's book In Search of the Supernatural.

His creativity was inspired by his many field trips with his teacher Chen Chuan-Xin. Teacher Chen took Hou to Tainan to see the Dongyue Temple, well known for its monks who communicate with ghosts. After visiting the Hall of Dragon Metamorphoses in Kaoshiung, Hou was shocked to find they chained the mental patients together. His creativity was equally fueled by the magical power of Taiwan's folklore. In fact he decided to create his own gods and weave his own mythology into his work. Consequently, in 1995，Anecdotes about Spirits and Immortals was selected to represent Taiwan in the Venice Biennale.

In 1997，Hou & his first wife divorced unexpectedly, which threw his world into total darkness. He lamented: “Geniuses such as poet Jean Nicolas Arthur Rimbaud、painter Vincent Willem Van Gogh、Amedeo Modigliani、Henri de Toulouse-Lautrec were all dead at the age of 37. When I was 10, I was fascinated that their lives could burst into flames so suddenly and so brilliantly, therefore, I thought to die young would be worth it. And if I were not meant to be an artist like them, to spend 37 years in art would be long enough, I should start looking for something else to do. To me, 37 years old was a great gateway, and before I realized it, I was in front of this gateway.”His creativity also stagnated. A Suicide Message of Dying on Love at Age 36, Hou writes: “ My whole body hurt sharply when I lie down, I was not spared the pain when I was out of the bed either.”。

Hou did not stay depressed for long, he participated in group therapy and become a freelance writer and to paint aimlessly. These were all attempts to cope with the pain. In particular, he found solace in painting the Mandala. For Hou, “The round mandala is a mirror reflecting your own inner world. You can meet yourself through painting aimlessly. A round Mandala is like a womb, a seed or an egg, it nourishes all possibilities.

In 2001，Hou became a father, which re-invigorated his artistic muse. From being a wandering ghost most of his life, he suddenly became a guardian of lives. Through voluminous freelance writing and graffiti paintings, Hou’s creative style had metamorphosed from the art of “challenging any opponent to a fight” to the search for one's inner soul.

At the end of 2005, an art collector sent Hou's work to Hong Kong Sotheby's Sales for auction. Much to his surprise, Hou Chun-Ming shot to international stardom and his name became recognized worldwide. In 2007, inspired by Taiwan god culture, his print Erotic Paradise became an overnight sensation. It was sold for $480,000 HKD. His print Strong Anal Sex：The Buddha with Refined Love then sold for $192,000HKD. Hou's fame quickly escalated to new heights. In the same year at Hong Kong Christie's auction, his woodblock printings Anecdotes about Spirits and Immortals, a set of 37 pieces, were sold for $2.64 million HKD. It holds the record for the highest price by any Taiwan artists at an international auction. The smashing success of this work put Hou on the map. For the longest time, art collectors paid little attention to Taiwan artists. Hou changed that. His talent and fame attracted global fascination to not just himself, but for the Taiwan art community at large.

Since 2012, Hou made himself the contemporary Cangjile who created the original Chinese script. Hou drew scripts and made them into charms with calling power. Hou believes that charms are scripts that have not yet been tamed, and charm's power came from the secret desires of a person. He said that each script when written out is actually a charm with strong calling power, for example, when we write love letters, we are calling for love, when we write in Facebook, we are looking for friendship and when we draft a complaint, we are seeking justice. Hou dissects words from short sentences and combine them into a charm, or he uses the sound, shape and meaning of words and the beliefs in Taiwan folklore, he develops them into new Chinese characters.

== Public reception and criticism ==
Hou believed that if each of us has a little chaotic black area within our heart that we usually block and suppress. But, with self-dissecting method, Hou analyzes our dark spaces with art. By combining traditional religious rituals, body symbols and sex, he aims to relieve observers from life's strangest phenomena. A Taiwan TV personality Tsai Kang-Yun evaluated Hou's work, he said: “I can always feel Hou's power and think that I owe him for that. May be because he created his paintings out of pain or out of restraint, but all of us who are inspired by him owe him.

== Publications ==
- 1993 Anecdotes about Spirits and Immortals by China Times Publishing
- 2002 A Suicide Message of Dying on Love at Age 36 by Locus Publishing
- 2005 Crawling on the Belly / Going Hom by Ali Temple Publishing
- 2006 Journal by Pillow by Ali Temple Publishing
- 2007 The Caution in Mirror by PsyGarden Publishing
- 2007 Grain Rain‧Amorous Affair by Cans Art
- 2007 Calm Down at Toufen by Moon Gallery
- 2008 Collision between Taboo and Desire by International Culture and Tourism Bureau, Miaoli County
- 2008 Legend Hou's Sin & Punishment by Garden City Publishing
- 2009 Asian father by L’orangerie International Art Consultant Co., Ltd.
- 2009 Way to the Mystic Heart by PsyGarden Publishing
- 2009 The Announcement of Hou's Resurrection by Cultural Affairs Bureau of Chaiyi City
- 2009 My Mandela Sketch Book by PsyGarden Publishing
- 2010 Star bright by Moon Gallery
- 2013 Suffer from Desires：Hou Chun Ming's Free Drawing by PsyGarden Publishing

== Exhibitions ==
【One-person exhibitions】

- 1993－Anecdotes about Spirits and Immortals, Taipei Lion Art Gallery
- 1995－Hou Chun-Ming's Print Solo Exhibition, Yokohama Najota Gallery
- 2009－International Culture and Tourism Bureau, Miaoli County, Taichung / Miaoli, Taiwan

【Major Joint Exhibitions and New Book Releases】

- 1992－Erotic Paradise, Extension vs Breaking, Taipei Biennale 1992, Taipei Fine Art Museum
- 1996－New Paradise, Taipei Biennale 1996, Taipei Fine Art Museum
- 1998－God Hates You, Taipei Biennale 1998, Taipei Fine Art Museum
- 2006－The Contemporary Landscape in Taipei, MOCA
- 2008－The Eight Immortals Crossing the Sea, Electronic Colorful Glass Flower – The Translation of Ordinary Culture, Kaohsiung Fine Art Museum
- 2012－ime game:Contemporary Appropriations Of The Past, Taipei Fine Art Museum

Modern Monsters / Death and Life of Fiction, Taipei Biennial 2012 /Taipei Fine Art Museum

- 2013－Hui Aggregation：Cross-Strait Contemporary Art Exchange， Shanghai Xuhui Art Museum

【International Exhibitions】

- 1990－Busan International Biennale, Korea
- 1995－"Anecdotes about Spirits and Immortals", The 46th Venice Biennale

"Taiwan Contemporary art - Erotic Paradise", The Museum of Contemporary Art, Sidney

- 1996－"Say Yes, My Boy", Container'96 - Art Across Oceans in Copenhagen

"Out of Gallery Sin and Punishment", Hong Kong Arts Center
"Taiwan Art Today", Ludwig International Art Forum Hall, Berlin

- 1997－"In Search of Taiwan", The Drawing Center, New York

"Lu-Ting (Lantou)", Hong Kong Arts Center

- 1998－"INSIDE OUT: NEW CHINESE ART", MoMA PS1 / San Francisco Museum of Modern Art / Asia Society Museum / Monterey Museum of Art / Hong Kong Museum of Art / Tacoma Art Museum
- 1999－"Taiwan Art Exhibition", Fukuoka Asian Art Museum

"God Hates You", "Fin de Siècle Rituals", Taipei Economic and Cultural Office, New York

- 2004－"Contemporary Taiwanese Art in the Era of Contention", Johnson Museum of Art, Cornell University
- 2006－"The 15th Jaala Biennia Exhibition", Kyoto Fine Arts Museum
- 2008－" In God's name" Pyo Gallery, Seoul Korea
- 2009－Asian Father Interview Project, Yokohama Museum of Art

“Paper Symbol - Medium Extending”, Tang Contemporary Art Center, Hong Kong
"Always(as it was)", Tang Contemporary Art Center, Banykok

- 2010－"Généalogie Culturelle Plurielle", Festival Of Imaginary, St. Germain des Près, Paris

"Mandala of Love", Ai Kowada Gallery, Tokyo
"Asian Father Interview Project" Ver Gallery, Thailand
"The Eight Immortals Crossing the Sea", Index Gallery, Toronto

- 2013－"Boundaries on the Move", Taiwan –Israel Cross-Culture Dialogue, Herzliya Museum of Contemporary Art, Israel

"Rolling：Visual Art in Taiwan", Seoul Museum of Art
"Confession by Jun-Meng at Age 47", The 55th Venice Biennale, Venice
"Gazing into Freedom": Taiwan Contemporary Art Exhibition, Museum of Contemporary Art of Vojvodina
