= Nira Pereg =

Israeli artist (born 1969)

Nira Pereg נירה פרג
- Born: 1969 (age 56–57); Tel Aviv, Israel
- Known for: video art, video installation, photography
- Movement: Israeli art
- Website: nirapereg.net

Nira Pereg (Hebrew: נירה פרג; born 1969) is a visual artist. She was born in Tel Aviv. She lived in Jerusalem for a short time, where she graduated with an MFA from Bezalel Academy of Arts and Design. She is an Associate Professor of Art at Shenkar College.

== Exhibitions ==
- 2004 Canicule, Braverman Gallery, Tel-Aviv, Israel
- 2007 Roundabout, Braverman Gallery, Tel-Aviv, Israel
- 2007 Rites and Rituals, Herzliya Museum of Contemporary Art, Herzliya, Israel
- 2009 Sabbath 2008, Edith-Russ-Haus für Medienkunst, Oldenburg, Germany
- 2010 Kept Alive, Shoshana Wayne Gallery, L.A., California, USA
- 2010 Sabbath 2008, Santa Monica Museum of Art, L.A., California, USA
- 2010 Tel-Aviv Museum of Art - Winner of the Nathan Gottesdiener Foundation, Tel-Aviv, Israel
- 2010 LOOP Barcelona, Video-Art Fair, Barcelona, Spain
- 2011 ArtPowe, LOFT Video Gallery, UCSD San Diego, California, USA
- 2011 Sabbath, Chiado Museum, Lisbon, Portugal
- 2011 Black Box Series, Hirshhorn Museum and Sculpture Garden, Smithsonian Institution, Washington, USA
- 2012 Kept Alive, Kunsthalle Düsseldorf, Düsseldorf, Germany
- 2013 Abraham & Sarah, Weatherspoon Art Museum, North Carolina, USA
- 2013 67 Bows, Museum Ein Harod, Kibuts Ein Harod, Israel
- 2013 All This Can Be Reconstructed Elsewhere, CCA - The Center for Contemporary Art, Tel-Aviv, Israel
- 2013 Aichi Triennale, Aichi, Japan
- 2014 Abraham Abraham & Sarah Sarah, Musée d'Art et d'Histoire du Judaïsme, Paris, France
- 2015 Ishmael, Art Basel, Feature Section, Basel, Switzerland
- 2015 Rights and Rites, Rose Art Museum, Boston, USA
- 2015 The Right to Clean, Israel Museum Ticho House, Jerusalem, Israel
- 2017 This Red Red Stuff, Kunsthalle Darmstadt, Darmstadt, Germany
- 2018 Melt Away Before You or I Can't Believe it's Not Battle!, Laxart, Los Angeles, USA
- 2021 "Twilight Zones", Braverman Gallery, Tel Aviv, Israel
- 2022 "The Script Remains the Same", DEPO, Istanbul, Turkey
- 2023 "Abraham Abraham Sarah Sarah", Tate Modern, London, UK

== Publications ==
- Abraham Abraham Sarah Sarah. Paris: Musée d'Art et d'Histoire du Judaïsme, 2014. ISBN 978-2-9133-9131-4
- All This Can Be Reconstructed Elsewhere. Tel-Aviv: The Center for Contemporary Art (CCA), 2013. ISBN 978-965-7463-18-5
- Kept Alive Monograph. Tel-Aviv: Tel Aviv Museum of Art, 2011. ISBN 9789659170609

== Awards and residencies ==
- Maratier Prize 2013, Musée d'Art et d'Histoire du Judaïsme, Paris, France
- Nathan Gottesdiener Foundation Israeli Art Prize's, 2010, Tel-Aviv, Israel

== Collections ==
- Tate Modern
- National Gallery of Canada
- Centre Georges Pompidou, Paris, France
