= Tale of the Scale and the Skull (artwork) =

2024 permanent public artwork, Berlin

Coordinates: 52°30′47″N 13°24′14″E

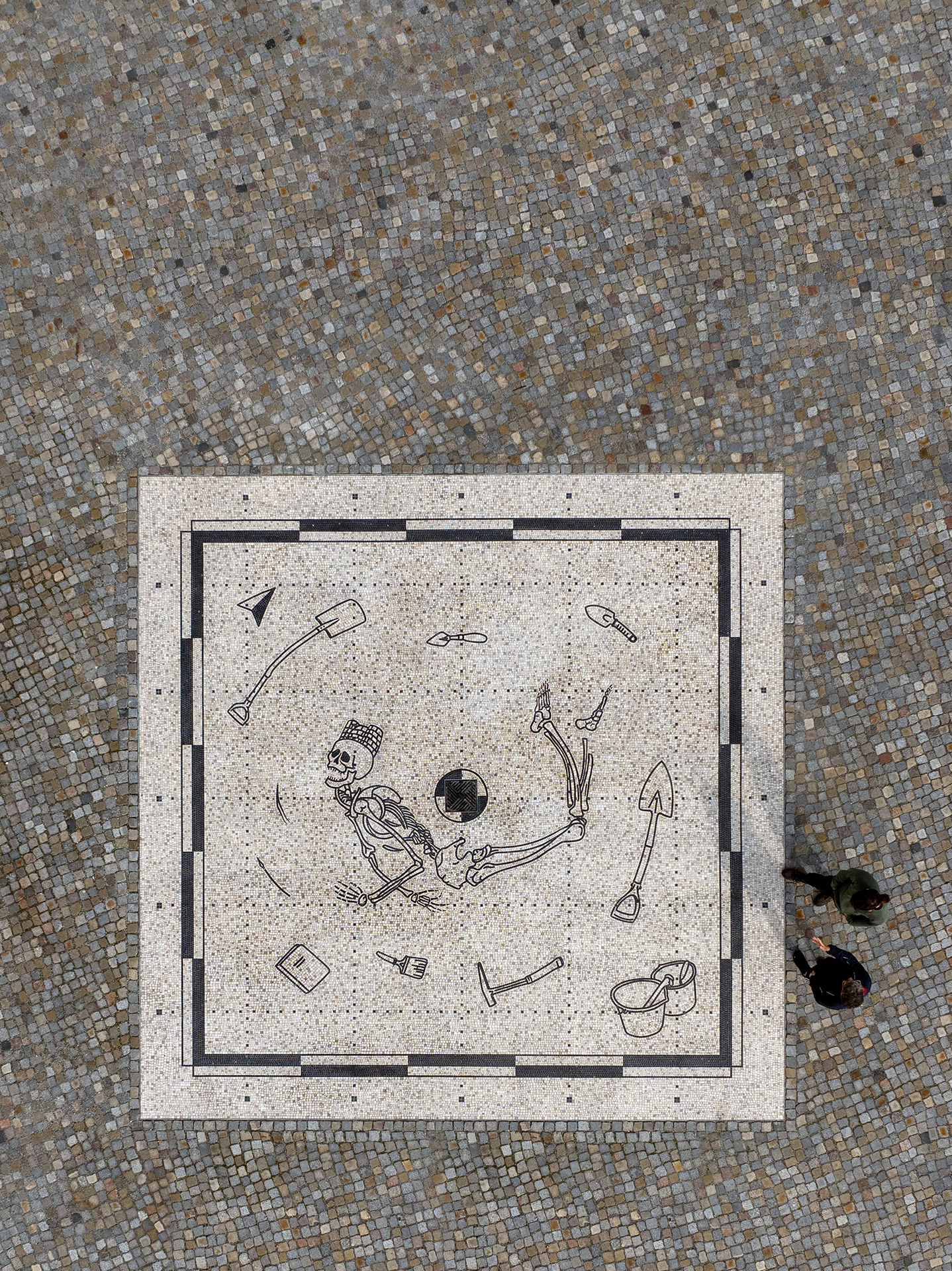
The Tale of the Scale and the Skull, Aerial view

The Tale of the Scale and the Skull is a permanent public artwork, a Kunst am Bau project by artist Alona Rodeh, which was installed in 2024 on the terrace of PETRI, the archaeological research and visitor center at Petriplatz in Berlin.

== Design ==
The work consists of 600 cm × 600 cm (240 in × 240 in) natural stone floor mosaic with a skeleton figure at the centre, which references medieval remains that were uncovered during excavations at the site, believed to be the "first Berliners". Surrounding the skeleton are illustrations of archaeological tools, bones, and measuring instruments. The composition also incorporates a depiction of the 19th-century allegorical statue Berolina, a female personification of Berlin.

The artwork was commissioned by Berlin’s Senate Department for Culture and Social Cohesion, in cooperation with Berlin’s Senate Department for Urban Development and Housing.
