= Shpilman Institute of Photography =

Israeli non-profit organisation

- Abbreviation: The SIP
- Formation: 2010
- Dissolved: 2015
- Type: International Non-profit organization
- Legal status: A legal entity operating in accordance with the laws of the Israel
- Purpose: Promoting photography art
- Headquarters: Israel
- Location: 27 Schocken St., 3rd floor, Tel Aviv, Israel
- Region served: Worldwide, Israel
- Members: National organization
- Official language: English, Hebrew
- Main organ: Board of Directors
- Website: www.thesip.org/language/en/frontpage/the-shpilman-institute-for-photography

The Shpilman Institute for Photography (SIP) was an Israeli non-profit organisation which promoted photography worldwide.

== History ==
SIP was founded in 2010 Shalom Shpilman in order to promote photography as an art in Israel and worldwide. The institute, located in Tel Aviv, hosts exhibitions, lectures and various artistic activities by people in the field of photography and media art.

The SIP also provides ground and holds academic research. It offers grants and scholarships to projects, both locally in Israel and internationally.

In addition to hosting temporary exhibitions, the SIP had a permanent collection with over 900 works, including photographs by Erwin Blumenfeld, Frederick Sommer, Berenice Abbott, Arthur Siegel, Nan Goldin, Cindy Sherman, Man Ray, Cecil Beaton, Elliott Erwitt, Bill Brandt, Andre Breton, Claude Cahun, Salvador Dalí, Harry Callahan, Paul Heismann, Yasuhiro Ishimoto, Adi Nes, Jeff Wall, Uri Gershuni, Ilit Azulay, Deganit Berest, Eli Lotar, Ohad Matalon, Lee Miller and Michal Heiman.

As of end 2016, Shpilman Institute of Photography ceased its activities and sold its permanent collection at Sotheby's and Christie's. Fifty-five works from the collection were purchased by Israel Museum. The organisation site's latest update was at the end of 2014 and the institute premises were vacated at the beginning of 2015. The Shpilman International Prize for Excellence in Photography remains active though patronage of Israel Museum.

== Shpilman International Prize for Excellence in Photography ==
The Shpilman Institute for Photography in collaboration with The Israel Museum in Jerusalem awards the bi-annual Shpilman International Prize for Excellence in Photography.

== Executive Board ==
- Shalom Shpilman. President and Founder
- Dr. Nissan M. Peretz. Vice President
