= David Adika =

Israeli photographer and educator (born 1970)

David Adika דוד עדיקא
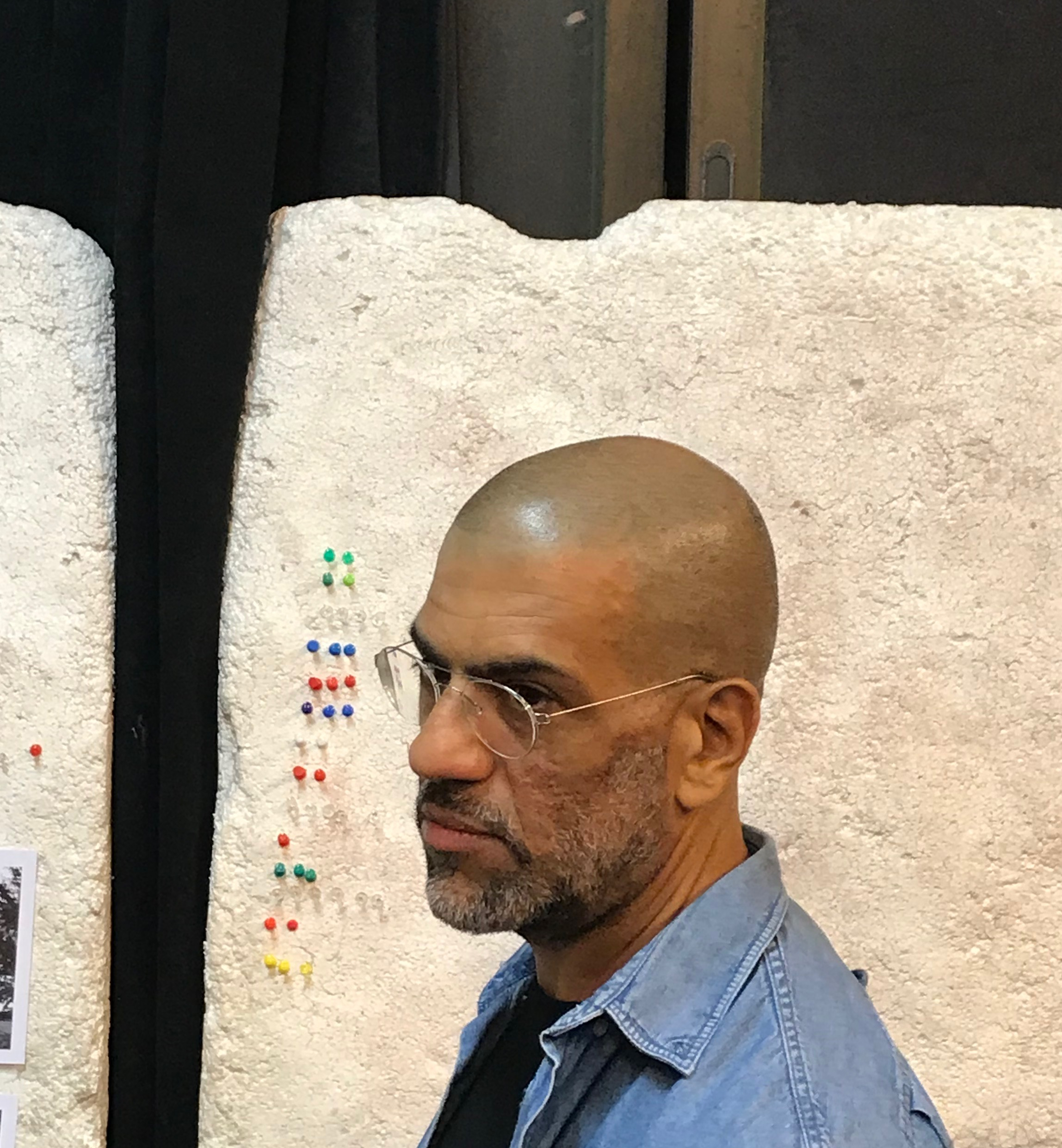
- David Adika at opening of International Photography Festival (Israel) in 2017
- Born: 1970 (age 55–56); Jerusalem, Israel
- Education: Bezalel Academy of Art and Design
- Known for: Photography
- Movement: Israeli art, Modern Art

David Adika (Hebrew: דוד עדיקא) is an Israeli photographer and professor of visual arts.

== Biography ==
David Adika (דוד עדיקא) was born in Jerusalem in 1970. He lives and works in Tel Aviv. Adika graduated from Bezalel Academy of Art and Design in 1997, receiving a BFA. He received an MFA in 2004, graduating from joint educational program of Bezalel Academy of Art and Design and Hebrew University Advanced Studies Program. He was appointed head of photography department of Bezalel Academy of Art and Design in January 2018.

== Academic career ==
- 1999–present: Bezalel Academy of Art and Design, Jerusalem. Professor.
- 2004–present: Shenkar College of Engineering and Design, Ramat Gan. Professor
- 2010–present: School of the Arts ''Campus Arison'', Tel Aviv. Head of the Visual Arts Department.
- 2018–present: Bezalel Academy of Art and Design, Jerusalem. Head of Department of Photography.

== Exhibitions ==
=== Solo ===
- 2016 Table studies - Museo Morandi, Bologna.
- 2014 As In Water Face Reflects Face - Latvian National Museum of Art, Riga.
- 2013 As In Water Face Reflects Face - The Open Lens Gallery, Braverman Gallery, Tel Aviv
- 2012 Equator - The Open Lens Gallery, The Gershman Y, University of the Arts, Philadelphia [Curator: Jordan Rockford]
- 2011 Oululu - East Central Gallery, London
- 2010 Living Room - Helena Rubinstein Pavilion, Tel Aviv Museum of Art [Curator: Hadas Maor]
- 2009 Every Monkey is a Gazelle in Its Mother's Eyes - Braverman Gallery, Tel Aviv (Artist Book)
- 2007 Come Thou Beauty - 3 solo shows, The Art Gallery, University of Haifa [Curator: Ruti Direktor]
- 2006 Fix (‘Tikkun’) - Braverman Gallery, Tel Aviv
- 2006 After Winter Must Come Spring - Q! Gallery, Glasgow International Festival of Contemporary Visual Art [Curator: Rancis McKee]
- 2005 In–Out - Ashdod Museum of Art, Monart Center [Curator: Yona Fischer]
- 2004 Multi-Function - Graduation Show, Bezalel Gallery, Tel Aviv
- 2004 Will It Shine - Kav 16 Gallery, Tel Aviv [Curator: Galia Yahav]
- 2004 Works - Neta Eshel – House for Art, Caesarea (with Gal Weinstein)
- 2003 Mahogany - Herzliya Museum of Contemporary Art, Herzliya [Curator: Dalia Levin]
- 2002 Mother Tongue/Portraits - Hagar Gallery, Jaffa [Curator: Tal Ben-Zvi]
- 2002 Sacker Garden - Oranim Gallery, Tivon (with Eli Petel) [Curator: David Wakstein]
- 2001 Lifestyle - Borochov Gallery, Tel Aviv; in collaboration with the Photography Department Bezalel Academy of Art and Design, Jerusalem [Curator: Sharon Yaari]

=== Group ===
1998

- To the East -Orientalism in the Arts in Israel - Israel Museum, Jerusalem [Curators: Yigal Zalmona, Tamar Manor-Friedman]

2003

- Tel Aviv-Glasgow-Tel Aviv - Bezalel Gallery, Tel Aviv, in cooperation with GSA (Glasgow School of Arts) [Curator: Nachum Tevet]
- Mother Tongue - Museum of Art, Ein Harod [Curator: Tal Ben-Zvi]
- Matter of Taste - The Israel Museum, Jerusalem [Curator: Hagit Allon]

2004

- Alphabet - Israelisk Samtidskonst, Kristinehamns Konstmuseum, Sweden [Curator: Tali Cederbaum]
- Lets Food - Bat Yam Museum of Art, Bat Yam
- Omanut Haaretz - (Art of the Land) Festival, Tel Aviv [Curator: Ruti Director]
- Animal, Vegetable, Mineral - Bezalel Gallery, Tel Aviv [Curator: Nachum Tevet]
- Pets - Time for Art – Center for Contemporary Art, Tel Aviv [Curator: Tali Cederbaum]
- In Days Gone By, At this Time - Rubin Museum, Tel Aviv [Curator: Carmela Rubin, Shira Naftali]
- The Scream 2 - Homage Exhibition to Edvard Munch's “The Scream”, Kav 16 Gallery, Tel Aviv [Curator: Galia Yahav]

2005

- Prizes in Art and Design from the Ministry of Education, Culture and Sport - 2004, Tel Aviv Museum of Art [Curator: Ellen Ginton]
- Artic 7 - Recipients of the Sharett scholarship for Young Israeli Artists, The Museum of Israeli Art, Ramat Gan
- Yona at Bezalel - Issues in Contemporary Curating, Bezalel Gallery, Tel Aviv [Curators: Sarit Shapira, Sandra Weill]
- Reunion - Braverman Gallery, Tel Aviv [Curator: Yani Shapira]

2006

- 3rd Generation - Photography in Estate of Identity Crises, Minshar Gallery, Tel Aviv [Curator: Yair Barak]
- Present Now, Omanut Haaretz Festival - Reading Power Station, Tel Aviv [Curator: Tal Ben-Zvi]
- Incorrigible Young & Restless Romantics, Noga Gallery of Contemporary Art, Tel Aviv [Curator: Jossef Krispel]
- El Hama’ayan - The Yarkon Stream as a Cross-Section in the Israeli Metropolis, Tel Aviv Museum of Art [Curators: Meira Yagid Haimovici, Nathalie Kertesz, Ze’ev Maor]

2007

- Through the Object - The Open Museum of Photography, Tel Hai Industrial Park [Curator: Naama Haikin]
- Somewhere Better Than this Place - Braverman Gallery, Tel Aviv [Curator: Sally Haftel Naveh]
- The Rear - The 1st Herzliya Biennial of Contemporary Art, Herzliya [Curator: Joshua Simon]
- New Acquisitions - Haifa Museum of Contemporary Art, Haifa [Curator: Tami Katz-Freiman]

2008

- Territoires - The 6th Biennale of International Photography, Liege - Belgium [Curator: Dorothee Luczak]

2009

- Watermelons - Rubin Museum, Tel Aviv [Curator: Carmela Rubin, Shira Naftali]
- David and the Girls - POV Festival of Contemporary Photography, Tel Aviv [Curator: David Adika]
- 4 Openings in Israeli Art - Salame Gallery, Tel Aviv [Curator: Ruti Direktor]
- Faces: Inside and Out - Eretz Israel Museum, Tel Aviv [Curators: Danna Taggar Heller]
- Maximalism - Avni Institute - Tel Aviv [Curator: Aline Alagem]
- Solace - Inga Gallery, Tel Aviv [Curator: David Adika]
- Tel Aviv Time, Tel Aviv Museum of Art, Tel Aviv [Curator: Nili Goren]

2010

- Looking In, Looking Out - The Window in Art, Israel Museum, Jerusalem [Curator: Hagit Allon]
- Memoria Technica - eastcentral gallery, London [Curator: Adi Gura]
- Stop Making Sense - Oslo Fine Art Society [Curator: Marianne Hultman]
- Shelf Life - Haifa Museum of Art [Curators: Tami Katz-Freiman, Rotem Ruff]
- With This Ring - Beth Hatefutsoth, Tel Aviv [Curator: Raz Samira]
- True Colors - Soho Gallery, London. The Cube Gallery, Manchester [Curator: Daniel Cahana Levinson]

2011

- Jerusalem Beach - The Artists’ Studios - Art Cube Gallery, Jerusalem [Curator: Iris Mendel]
- Nimrod's Descendants - Jerusalem Artists’ House Gallery, Jerusalem [Curator: Gideon Ofrat]

2012

- The Winners - The Minister of Culture Award for Fine-Art Artist, Ministry of Science, Culture and Sport, Jerusalem. Petach-Tikava museum of Contemporary Art [Curator: Naomi Aviv]
- Making Room, Contemporary Israeli Photography, From the Museum Collection - Tel Aviv Museum Of Art, [Curator: Nili Goren]
- Archive - Fresh Paint Art Fair, Special Project [Curator: Iris Rivkind]

2013

- Lot's Wife - The Photographic Gaze, The Open Museum of Photography [Curator: Naama Haikin]
- Curator - Yona Fischer, Beginnings of Collection, Ashdod Museum of Art, Monart Center [Curators: Yuval Beaton, Roni Cohen-Binyamini]
- Human Nature - Braverman Gallery, Tel Aviv [Curator: Adi Gura]
- Night Stamp - "Beit Ha'ir museum", Tel Aviv [Curator: Claudette Zoree, Ayelet Bitan Shlonski]

2017

- Regarding Africa: Contemporary Art and Afro-Futurism. Tel Aviv Art Museum.

== Scholarships and awards ==
- The Minister of Culture Award for Fine Art Artist, Ministry of Science, Culture and Sport, Jerusalem, 2011
- The Jack Nailor Award for Photography, Haifa Film Festival, 2011
- Sharet Scholarship, America-Israel Cultural Foundation, 2005
- Young Artist Award, Ministry of Science, Culture and Sport, Jerusalem, 2004
- P.S.S. Pilot Summer School, Glasgow School of Arts, Scotland Foreign Ministry and British Council, 2003
- Dean's Award, yearly scholarship, Bezalel Academy of Art and Design, Jerusalem, 1996
- Dean's Award, yearly scholarship, Bezalel Academy of Art and Design, JerusalemMulti-Function, Graduation, 1995
