= Alona Rodeh =

Israeli-Romanian visual artist born 1979

- אלונה רודה
- Alona Rodeh in her Berlin studio, 2020
- Born: 1979 (age 46–47); Ben Ami, Israel
- Education: Bezalel Academy of Arts and Design, Jerusalem
- Known for: Visual art
- Website: alonarodeh.com

Alona Rodeh (Hebrew: אלונה רודה; born 1979) is a contemporary artist and DarkSky advocate whose work combines sculpture, video, immersive sound and light installations and public art.

== Biography ==
Alona Rodeh was born and raised in Israel. She earned a Bachelor of Fine Arts degree from the Bezalel Academy of Arts and Design in Jerusalem in 2003 and participated in the BFA exchange program of the Academy of Fine Arts, Vienna. She completed her Master of Fine Arts degree at the Tel Aviv campus of Bezalel in 2009, spending a semester at the Sculpture Department of the Royal College of Art in London. Rodeh lives and works in Berlin.

== Art career ==
Applying her experience as a stage designer for theater, Rodeh creates room installations combining light, movement, and sound. She describes these creations as a performance without performers offering a time-based experience. She also produces animation films (namely: CORE DUMP, which won the Off-Limits Award at Annecy Animation Festival in 2026 and an honorary mention for New Animation Art at Ars Electronica, Linz Austria. She has installed several Public Art and Kunst am Bau projects in Germany and Israel.

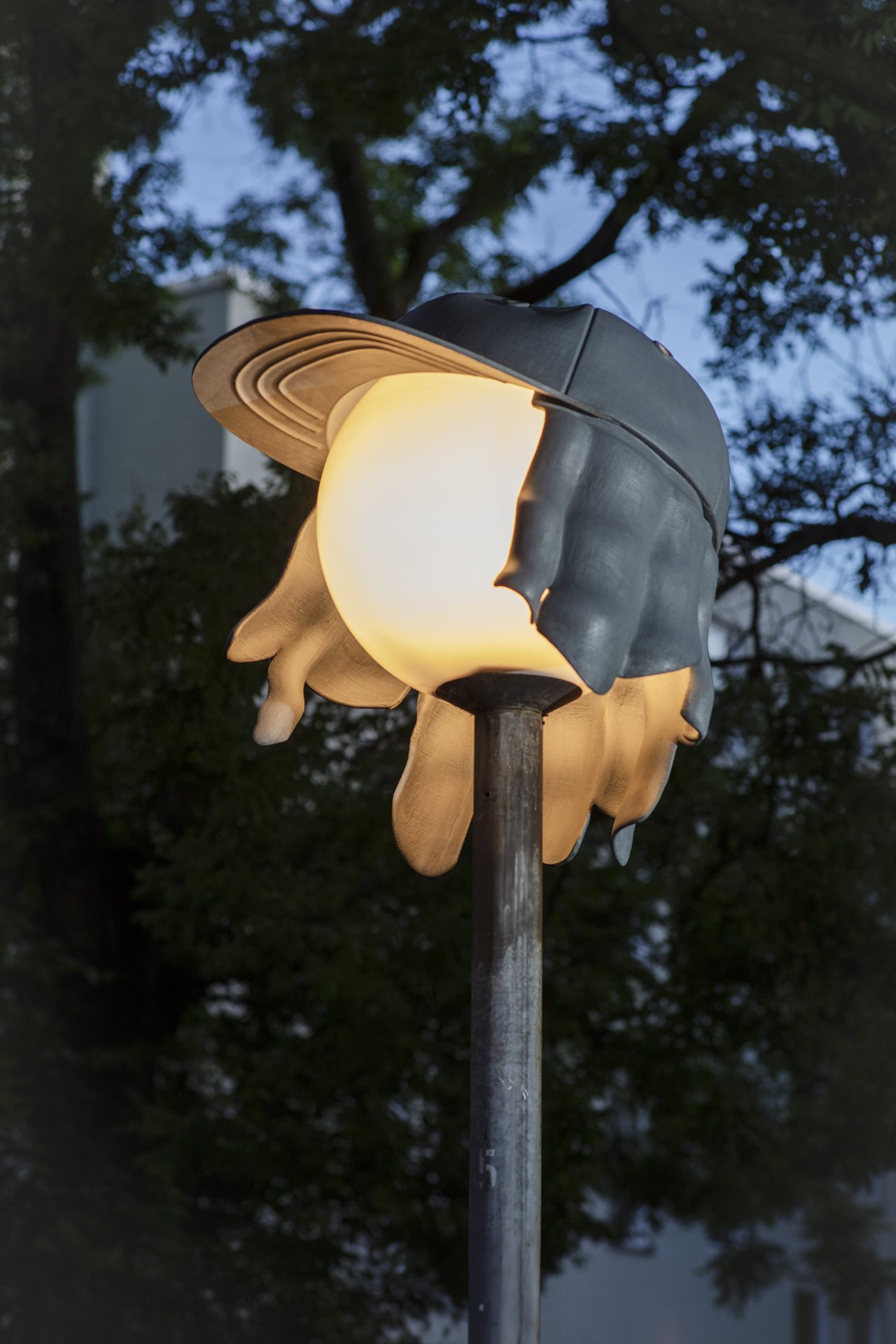
Nighcaps (Hot), Alona Rodeh in Brunnenviertel, Berlin Wedding 2025

Rodeh's Safe and Sound Project explores the history of off-the-shelf reflective and fluorescent illumination technologies.

== Solo exhibitions ==
- Phenomenal!, The Center for Digital Art, Holon 2025
- Interzone, Kunstmuseum Gelsenkirchen, May 2024
- CITY DUMMIES, Rosenfeld Gallery Tel Aviv, 2022
- Architecture of The Nights, Kunstpalais Erlangen, 2019
- DARK AGES 2020, Salzburger Kunstverein, 2019
- The Runner (LIVE), KOENIG2 by_robbygreif, Vienna, 2017
- Safe and Sound (Evolutions), Grimmuseum Berlin, 2015
- Safe and Sound I, Künstlerhaus Bethanien, Berlin, 2014
- Above and Beyond, CCA Tel Aviv, 2013
- The Resurrection of Dead Masters, Plug In Institute of Contemporary Art, Winnipeg, 2012
- The Etheric Body, Petach Tikva Museum of Art, 2011

== Group exhibitions (selection) ==
- The Opposite of Now, Jewish Museum Berlin, 2026
- Access Kafka, Jewish Museum Berlin, 2024
- CLUB, Dittrich and Schlechtriem, 2024
- In the Spotlight of the Night: Life in the Gloom, Marta Herford, 2019
- Showtime, Helena Rubinstein Pavilion for Contemporary Art, Tel Aviv Museum of Art, 2013

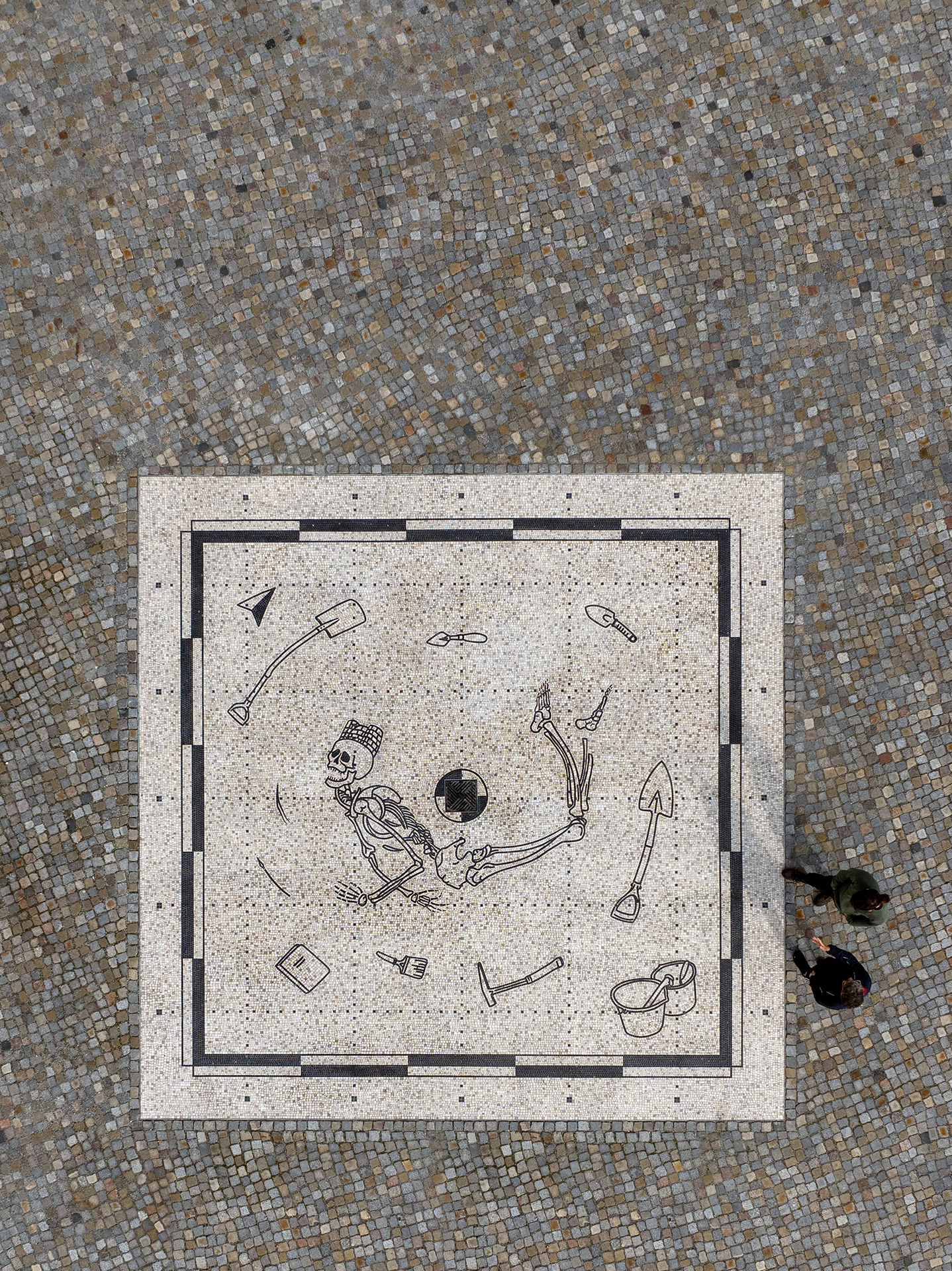
Alona Rodeh, The Tale of the Scale and the Skull, Petriplatz Berlin 2024

== Public Art / Art in Public Space ==
- The Observers, 2026: a permanent public artwork (a Kunst am Bau Projekt) installed at Paderborn University in NRW, Germany, consisting of a large Aluminum cast sculpture and landscaping elements in the grass lawn of the University campus.
- The Tale of the Scale and the Skull, 2024: a permanent public artwork installed on the terrace of PETRI Berlin, an archaeological research and visitor center at Petriplatz, Berlin
- Nightcaps, 2021/2024/2025: sculptures on street lamps addressing light pollution and cultural head coverings.
- Night walks: Rodeh conducts nocturnal walks through urban environments as part of her artistic research into the aesthetics and infrastructure of artificial illumination. These walks inform her broader investigation into how light technologies shape perceptions of safety, visibility, and control in public space.

== Video games ==
- Wasted, 2024

== Awards and recognition ==
Rodeh was the recipient of the 2011 Young Artist Prize from the Israeli Ministry of Culture and Sport. She also won various stipends from Stiftung Kunstfonds Bonn (2019), the Berlin Senate for Culture and Europe (2019, 2017), the Israel Lottery Council for Culture and Arts (2014, 2012), Artis (2013, 2010, 2008), Rabinovich Foundation (2013, 2012) Outset Israel (2013) and the Ostrovsky Family Fund (2013) and others. Fellowships included, among others, a six months residency at the Berlin Fire Brigade (in the frame of KUNSTrePUBLIK and ZK/U Berlin Artist Dis-Placement Residency), and a year-long residency at Künstlerhaus Bethanien, Berlin. Her short animation film CORE DUMP won the Off-Limits Award at Annecy Animation Festival in 2026 and an honorary mention for New Animation Art at Ars Electronica, Linz Austria.

== Published works ==
- Deiss, Amely; Kröger, Malte, eds. (2019). Safe & Sound: The Third Dimension, Kunstpalais Erlangen (in English and German). Kunstpalais Erlangen. ISBN 978-3-923899-51-7. With contributions by Deiss, Amely; Esteve, Pol; Hood, Raymond M.; Kealy, Séamus; Kroeger, Malte; Lam, William MC; Rodeh, Alona; and Wiggam, Marc.
- Rodeh, Alona, ed. (2017). Fire: Safe & Sound (in English and German). ZK/U Press. ISBN 978-3-945659-07-6. With contributions by Karjevsky, Gilly; Schöder, Thore; McCleary, Kristen; Hensler, Bruce; and Meinhoff, Ulrike.
- Rodeh, Alona, ed. (2015). Safe and Sound Delux Edition (in English and Hebrew). The Green Box. ISBN 978-965-7463-20-8. With contributions by Atwan, Shachar; Gallanti, Fabrizio; and Schwartz, Hillel.
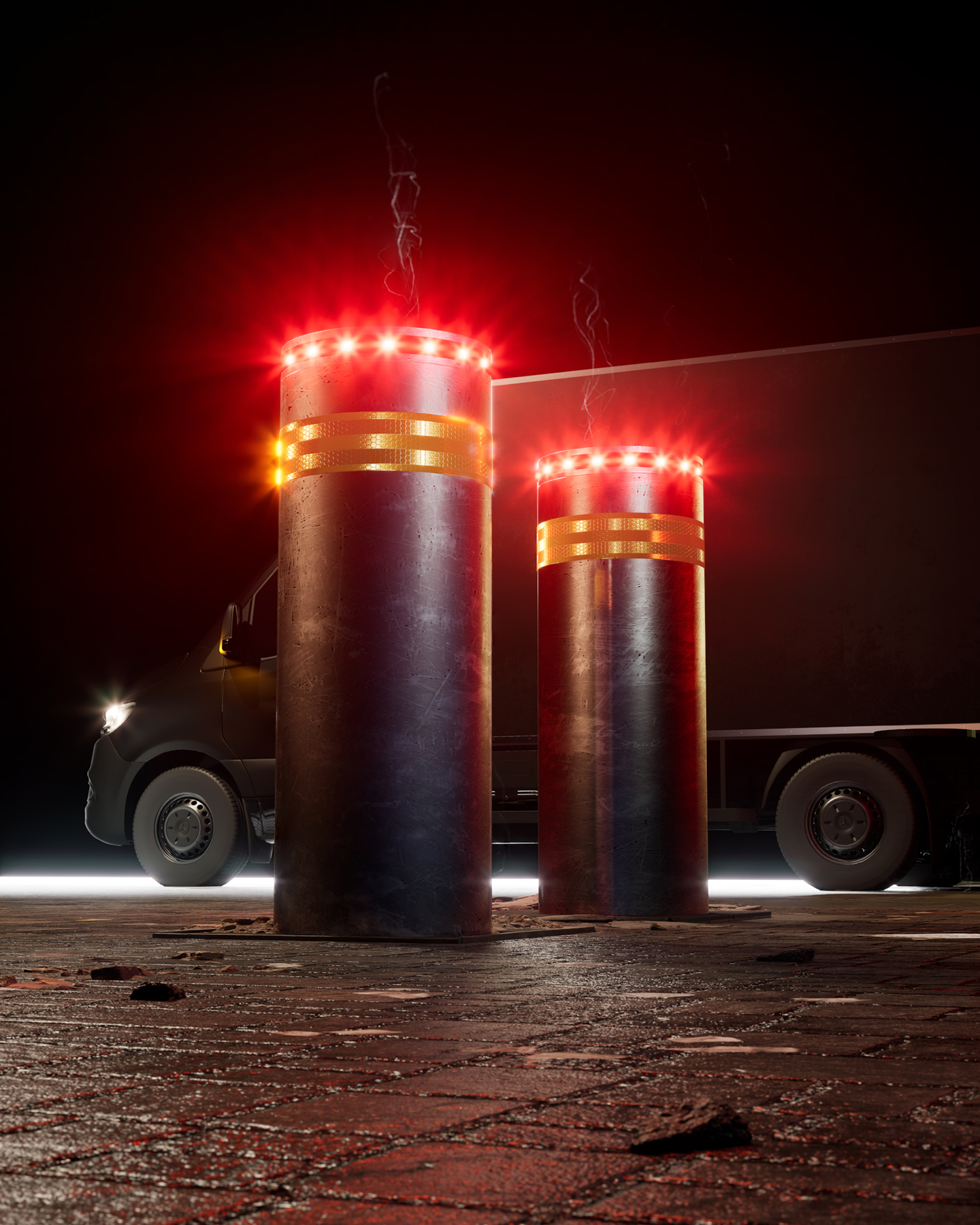
- Alona Rodeh, Bollard as Ashtray, Production stills, 20222
  Rodeh, Alona, ed. (2013). Above and Beyond (in English and Hebrew). CCA Tel Aviv. ISBN 978-965-7463-20-8. With contributions by Tamir, Chen; Rodeh, Alona; and Brand, Roy.
