= Tsibi Geva =

Israeli educator and music/art critic (born 1951)

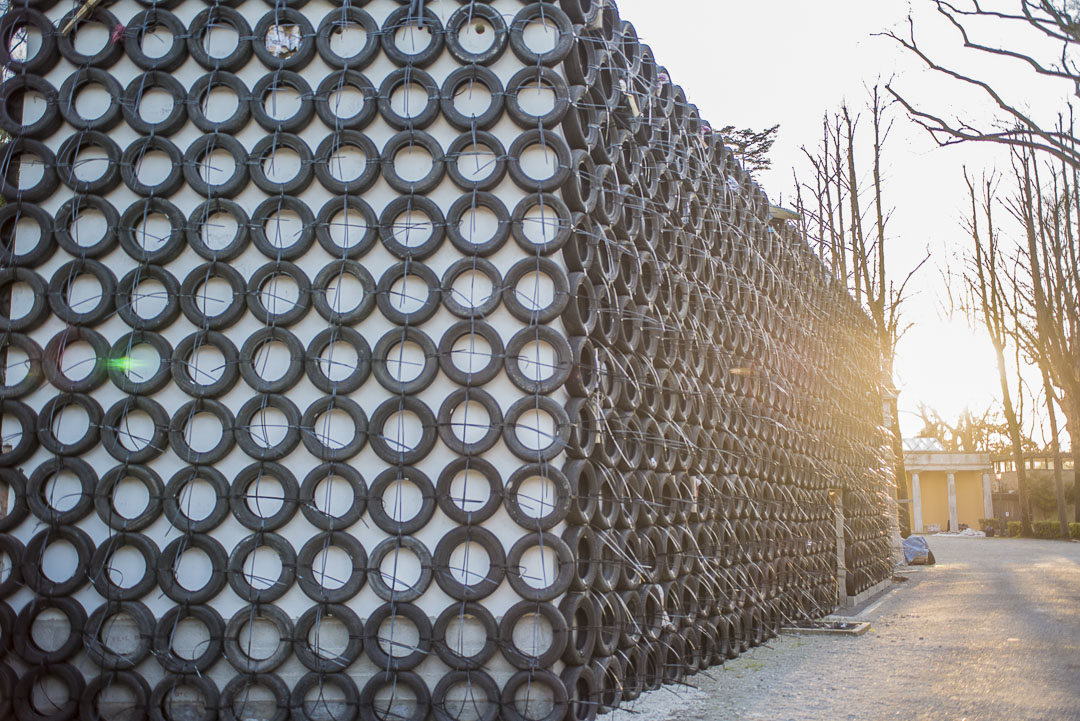
Venice Biennale Israel 2015 Tsibi Geva

Tsibi Geva (Hebrew: ציבי גבע) is one of Israel's most prominent and influential artists. (born 1951) is an Israeli educator and music/art critic. Geva's work is a cross between graffiti, sculpture and abstract expressionism.

== Biography ==
Tsibi Geva was born in 1951 in Kibbutz Ein Shemer, Israel. Geva lives and works in Tel Aviv and New York.

Since 1979, Geva has exhibited at the Israel Museum, Jerusalem (1984); the Institute of Contemporary Art, Boston (1985); the Tel Aviv Museum (1988); the Haifa Museum, Haifa (2003); the Tel Aviv Museum (2008); the American University Museum at the Katzen Arts Center, Washington, DC (2013); the MACRO Testaccio, Rome (2014) and the Mönchenhaus – Museum of Modern Art, Goslar (2015) and the Israeli Pavilion at the 56th Venice Biennale (2015).

== Art career ==
Geva's participation in international group exhibitions include the Kunsthaus Zürich Orangerie Herrenhausen, Hannover (1989); The Jewish Museum, New York(1989), Whitebox, NY (2013); Royal Palace of Milan, Milan (2006); Martin-Gropius-Bau, Berlin (2005); El Espacio Aglutinador, Havana, Cuba (1998); The Israel Museum, Jerusalem (2012); Tel Aviv Museum of Art (2016); Museum on the Seam, Jerusalem (2010), Dehallen Belfort, Bruges Belgium (2006), and CCA Andratx, Mallorca (2010).

Geva's works are included in galleries and collections including The MoMA Collection, NY; The Jewish Museum, New York; Rothfeld Collection, American University Museum, Washington DC; Museum on the Seam, Jerusalem; Tel Aviv Museum of Art; The Phoenix collection; Annina Nosei, NY; Arturo Schwartz, Italy; Donald Rothfeld, NY; Joshoua Gessel, Zurich; Michael Recanati, NY; Monique and Max Burger, Zurich.

Geva is a professor at the School of Visual Arts, MFA program, NY; the University of Haifa, and Hamidrasha School of Art, Beit Berl College, Israel.

== Solo exhibitions ==
- 1979 Tsibi Geva, Kibbutz Gallery, Tel Aviv
- 1979 Tsibi Geva, Sara Gilat Gallery, Jerusalem
- 1982 December 82, Kibbutz Gallery, Tel Aviv
- 1983 New Works, Sarah Gilat Gallery, Jerusalem
- 1984 Tsibi Geva, Julie M. Gallery, Tel Aviv
- 1984 Tsibi Geva, Special Exhibition, The Israel Museum, Jerusalem
- 1984 Streams: Tsibi Geva, ICA, Boston
- 1985 Tsibi Geva, Julie M. Galler,y Tel Aviv
- 1988 Tsibi Geva: Paintings, Tel Aviv Museum of Art
- 1989 Tsibi Geva, Julie M. Gallery. Tel Aviv
- 1990 Tsibi Geva, Anina Noosei Gallery, New York
- 1990 The Refuge and other paintings 1985–1988, Julie M. Gallery. Tel Aviv
- 1992 No, Julie M. Gallery. Tel Aviv, Bograshov Gallery, Tel Aviv
- 1993 Tsibi Geva, Anina Noosei Gallery, New York
- 1993 Blinds 1994, Julie M. Gallery Tel Aviv
- 1994 Tsibi Geva - Works 1988–1994, The Museum of Art, Ein Harod
- 1995 Tsibi Geva, Anina Nozay Gallery, New York
- 1995 The Great North Window of the Classroom, Julie M. Gallery. Tel Aviv
- 1997 Works, Julie M. Gallery Tel Aviv
- 1998 Tsibi Geva: December
- 1982 - December 1998, Kibbutz Gallery, Tel Aviv
- 1998 Caffé and Balata paintings, Ambrosino Gallery, Miami, Florida
- 1999 Kaffiyeh, Espacio Aglutinador, Havana, Cuba
- 1999 Summer, The Art Gallery of Kibbutz Beeri
- 2000 Works, Art Gallery, Kibbutz Rosh Hanikra
- 2001 High Holidays, Anina Noisy Gallery, New York
- 2001 Rage, Gallery Now, Berlin
- 2001 Gallery, Hagar Gallery, Jaffa
- 2001 The High Holidays, Tmuna Theater, Tel Aviv
- 2002 Background, Art Gallery, Kibbutz Kabri; Art Gallery of Kibbutz Lohamei Hagetaot
- 2003 Master Plan, Haifa Museum of Art, Haifa
- 2003 Birds of Our Country, 16th Line Gallery, Tel Aviv
- 2003 What Does the Bird Care About, Goren Art Gallery, Emek Yezreel Academic College
- 2004 Anina Noisy Gallery, New York
- 2005 After, Anina Noisy Gallery, New York
- 2006 Mount Analogue, The Midrasha Art Gallery, Tel Aviv
- 2006 Other Flowers, The New Gallery, Beit Gabriel on the Sea of Galilee
- 2007 Still Life, Armno Tedeschi Gallery, Rome
- 2008 Tel Devarim, Tel Aviv Museum of Art
- 2009 Biladi, Biladi - Works 1983–1985, Warehouse 2, Jaffa Port
- 2009 Inayach, Herzliya Museum of Art
- 2010 The Other Works, Pratt Gallery, Tel Aviv
- 2010 Song of the Land, San Galo Art Gallery, Florence
- 2010 Tsibi Geva - New Works, Anina Noisy Gallery, New York
- 2011 Tsibi Geva, Winners Two Thousand and Ten, Museum of Israeli Art, Ramat Gan
- 2011 Kaffiyeh, Artist Wall, Peres Center for Peace
- 2012 The bird inside is standing outside, Hyrcanus Orca, Messina, Sicily
- 2012 New Works, Studio in Alfasi, Tel Aviv
- 2012 Object, Crossing, Ashdod Museum of Art, Monart Center, Ashdod
- 2015 Exhibition, The Israeli Pavilion to the Biennale of Art, Venice

== Awards ==
- 1984 - America-Israel Cultural Foundation, Sharett Scholarship for Continuing Education Abroad
- 1985 - Koliner Prize for Young Artist, The Israel Museum, Jerusalem
- 1994 - Prize of the Minister of Science and the Arts for Plastic Arts
- 1996 - Isracard Prize for Art, Tel Aviv Museum of Art
- 1997 - Sandberg Prize for Israeli Art, The Israel Museum, Jerusalem
- 2001 - Jeanette and George Jaffin Prize, America-Israel Cultural Foundation
- 2003 - The Haifa Museum of Art Prize
- 2004 - Eva and Mendel Pundik Foundation Prize for Israeli Art, Tel Aviv Museum of Art
- 2010 - Lifetime Achievement Award, Israeli Ministry of Culture
