= Uriel Miron =

Israeli artist and sculptor (born 1968)

Uriel Miron (Hebrew: אוריאל מירון; born 1968) is an Israeli artist and sculptor.

== Biography ==
Uriel Miron was born in Tel Aviv in 1968. His grandmother is Dvora Schocken, An Israeli art collector. For many years he lived with his father, the literary critic Dan Miron, in the United States. In the 1980s he learned Literature at Yale University. in the 1990s he returned to live in Israel and studied Art at Bezalel. Many of his sculptures based on hybrid skeletons and anatomies originate in such ordinary objects and materials as plastic lawn chairs or cardboard boxes.

== Gallery ==
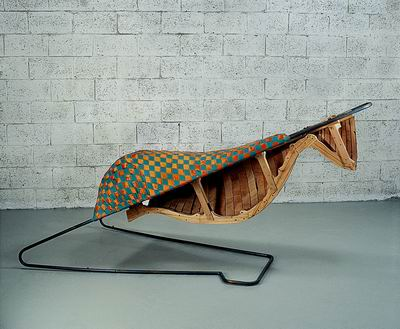
Momento Mobili, 1999, The Israel Museum, Jerusalem Collection

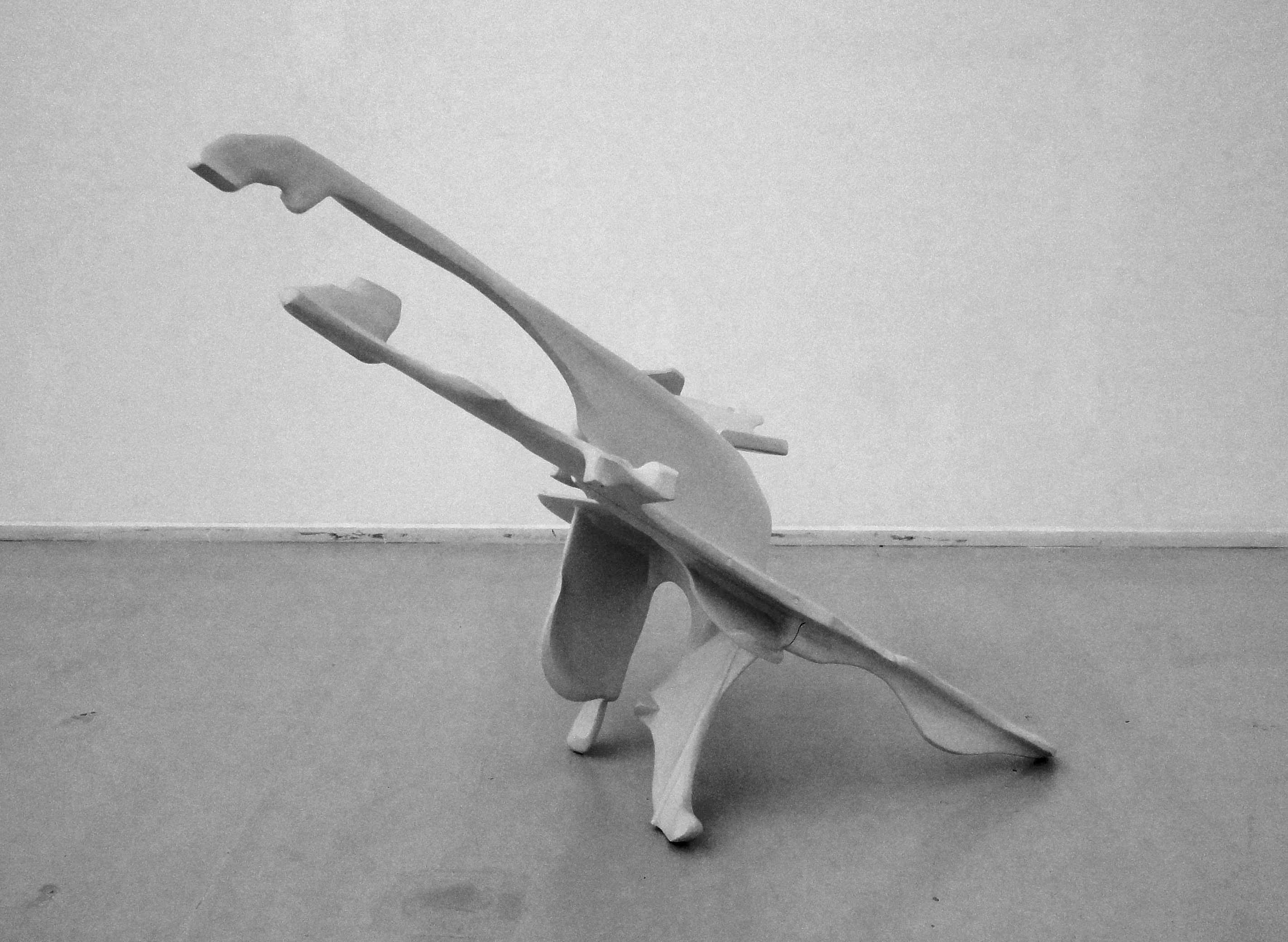
A Bone's Throw 3 (Roll), 2013

== Education ==
- 1986–1990 Yale University, B.A. in literature, magna cum laude, with distinction in the major
- 1990–1995 Bezalel, Jerusalem, art, graduated with Honors
- 1996–1998 School of Visual Arts, New York, M.F.A. cum laude

== Prizes and awards ==
- 1989 Dorot Fund grant for photography project
- 1995 Prize for Excellence in Art, Bezalel Academy of Arts and Design, Jerusalem
- 1996–1998, Excellent Achievement Prize, School of Visual Arts, New York City
- 1998 Faculty Committee Scholarship, School of Visual Arts, New York City
- 2002 Paula Rhodes Memorial Award
- 2005 Artists' achievement award, Ministry of Education, Culture and Sport, Israel
- 2009 Scholarship, Rabinovich Foundation, Tel Aviv
- 2012 Support of an Artist for Exhibiting Abroad, The Council of Art and Culture at the National Lottery
- 2013 Prize in Visual Arts, Ministry of Culture and Sport, Israel
