= Ashdod Museum of Art =

Coordinates: 31.7919°N 34.6374°E

- מוזיאון אשדוד לאמנות
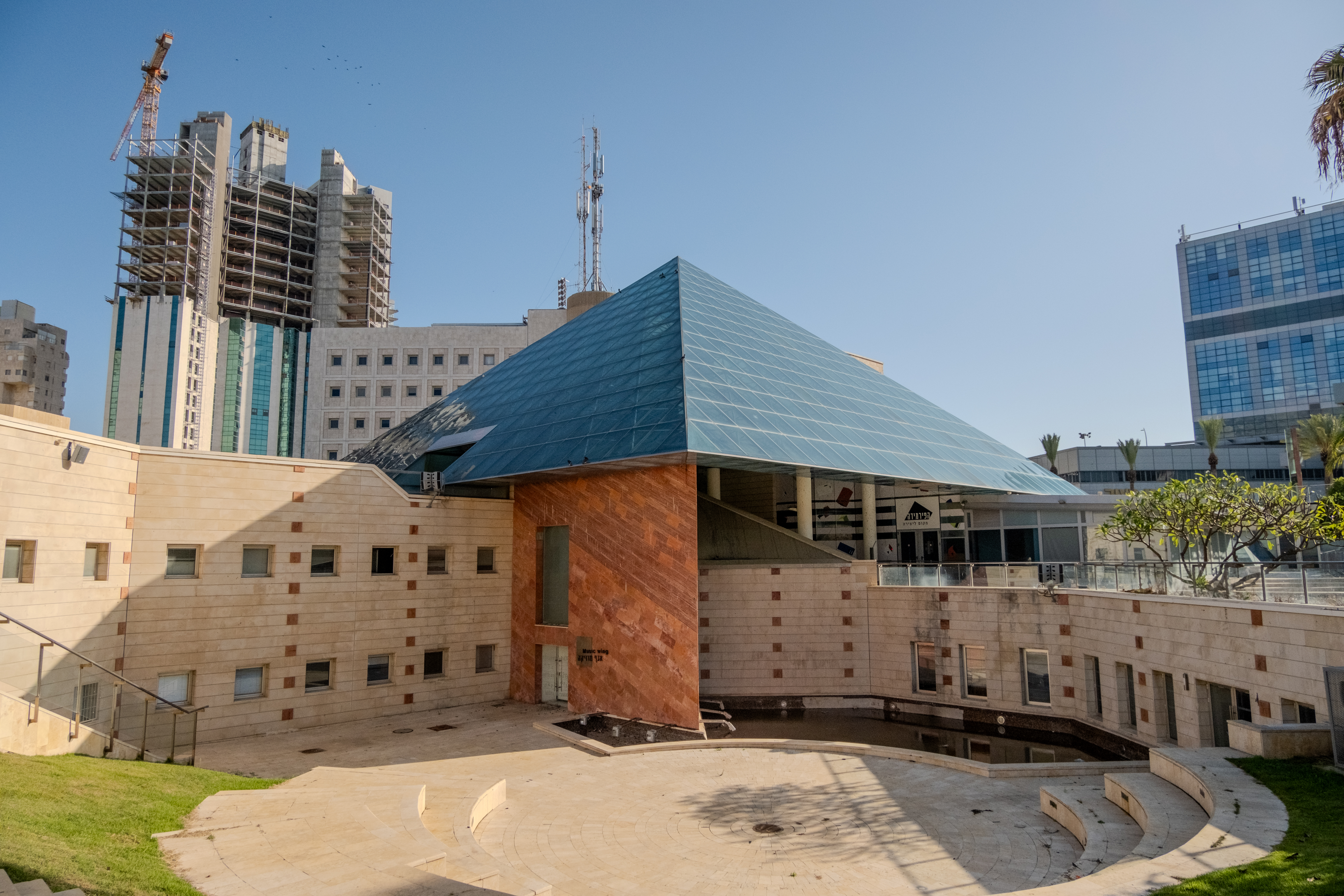
- Established: 2003
- Location: Derech Erets 8, Ashdod
- Type: Art museum, Contemporary art museum
- Curator: Yuval Biton
- Website: Official website (in Hebrew)

The Ashdod Museum of Art (Hebrew: מוזיאון אשדוד לאמנות) is located in the center of Ashdod, Israel, near the marina. The museum holds exhibitions of Israeli and international contemporary art. The museum has 12 galleries and two halls. In addition, it has a pyramidal space where cultural events are held. The museum was inaugurated in 2003. The museum was officially recognized by the State of Israel only in 2009.

One of museum's galleries – the Mishbetzet gallery – usually hosts original works by Israeli artists for children's education purposes. The visitors are encouraged to study works of art, including touching them. The Green Submarine gallery is dedicated to environmental art. The works exhibited in this gallery are made from recycled materials and readymades.

The Ashdod Museum of Art is also known for having an underground vault for protecting art in case of rocket attacks. This vault was used during the 2014 Israel–Gaza conflict to protect works of the Israeli artist Tsibi Geva.
