= Haifa Museum of Art =

Museum in Haifa, Israel

Coordinates: 32°49′19.6″N 34°59′31.98″E

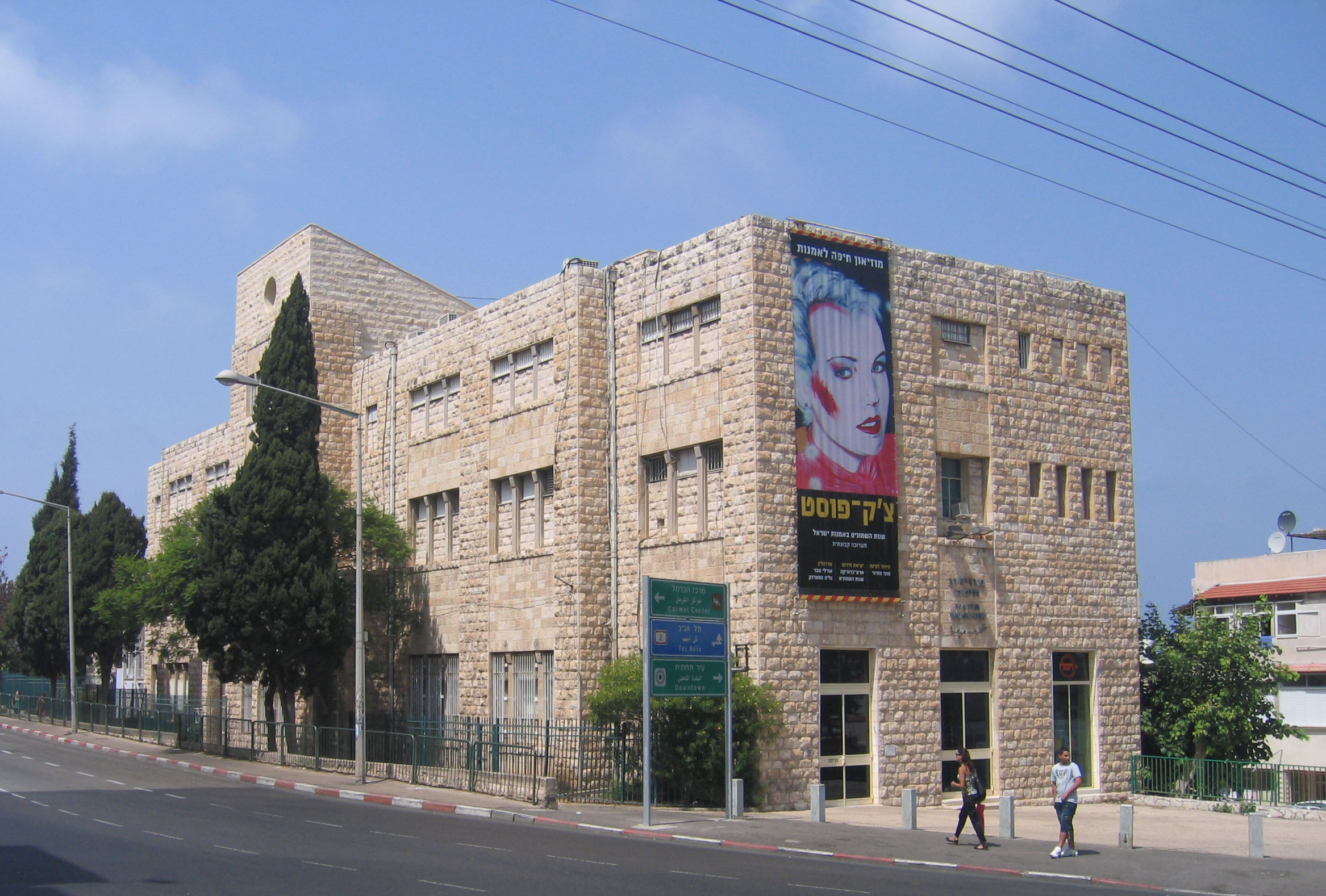
- Haifa Museum of Art
- Established: 1951
- Location: 26 Shabbetai Levi Street, Haifa, 3304331
- Type: Art museum
- Director: yotam yakir
- Curator: kobi ben meir
- Website: www.hma.org.il/eng

The Haifa Museum of Art (Hebrew: מוזיאון חיפה לאמנות, Arabic: متحف حيفا للفنون), established in 1951, is located in a historic building built in the 1930s in Wadi Nisnas, downtown Haifa. Ranking as Israel's third largest art museum, the museum focuses on Israeli and international contemporary art, and its collection includes 7,000 items, mostly of contemporary Israeli art.

== History ==
The Haifa Museum of Art was founded in 1951 in Haifa for a large exhibition of Marc Chagall. The museum was moved to its current stone building in Wadi Nisnas in 1977.

== Building ==
The building was built in the late 1920s and was inaugurated in the early 1930s as an Anglican school for girls. After the establishment of the State of Israel, it served as an immigrant center and from the early 1950s it hosted the private high school called the "High School for the Children of Workers", which was run by a teachers' cooperative and belonged to the Workers Movement. At the end of the 1960s, a branch of the Histadrut "Mishlav" school, which was preparing adult students for matriculation exams, began operating in the afternoon. In 1978 the site was opened to the public as a municipal museum, after extensive renovation designed to prepare exhibition spaces and galleries.

== Permanent collection ==
The permanent collection includes works of Joseph Zaritsky, Mordechai Ardon, Lea Nikel, Raffi Lavie, Moshe Gershuni, Michal Na'aman, Pinchas Cohen Gan, Tsibi Geva, Yechiel Shemi, Yitzhak Danziger, David Adika, Igor Zeiger, Ranan Lurie, Marc Chagall, Honoré Daumier, Odilon Redon, Chana Orloff and André Masson.

== Gallery ==
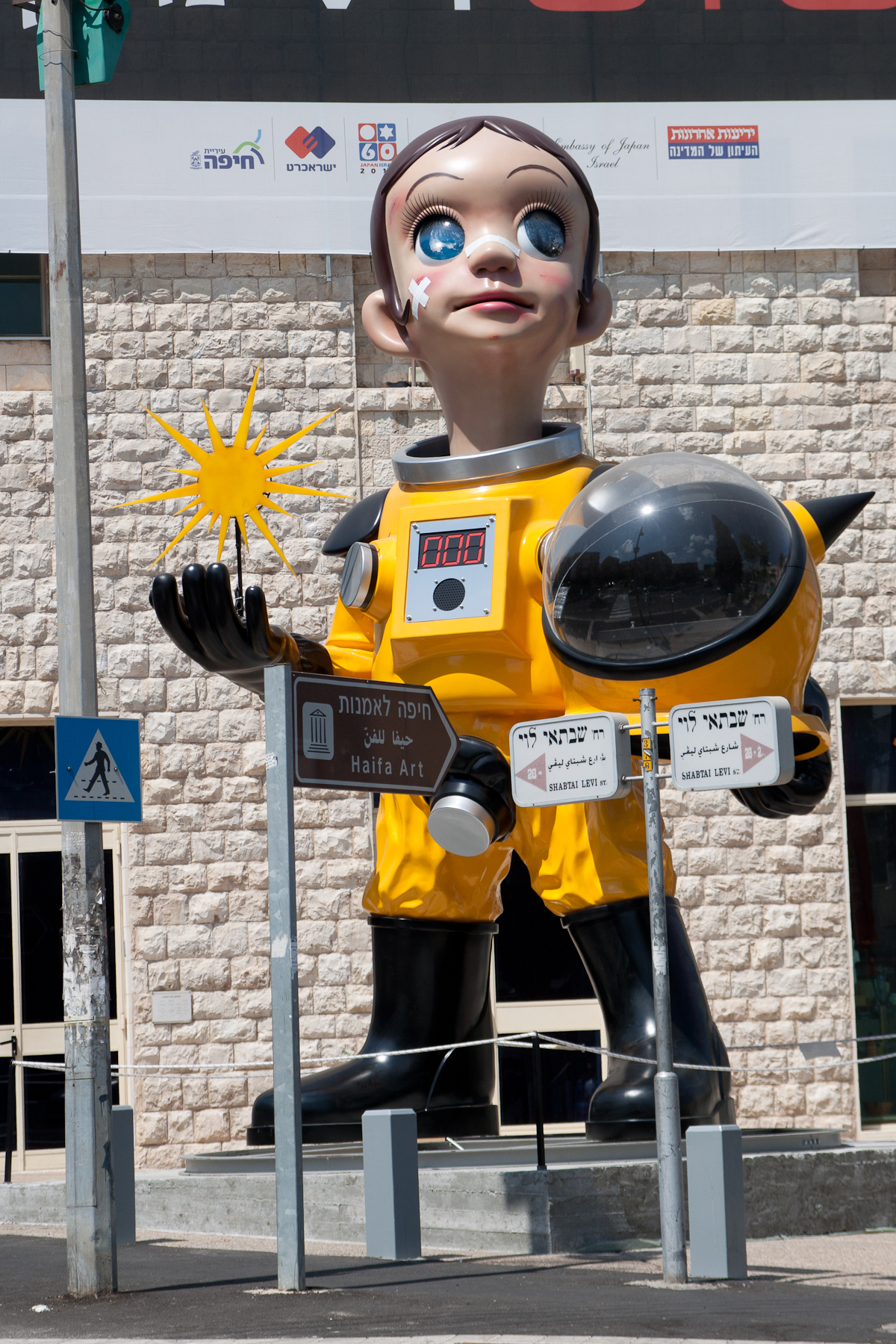
Kenji Yanobe's "Sun Child" outside the Haifa Museum of Art, part of the "Double Vision" exhibition of contemporary Japanese art

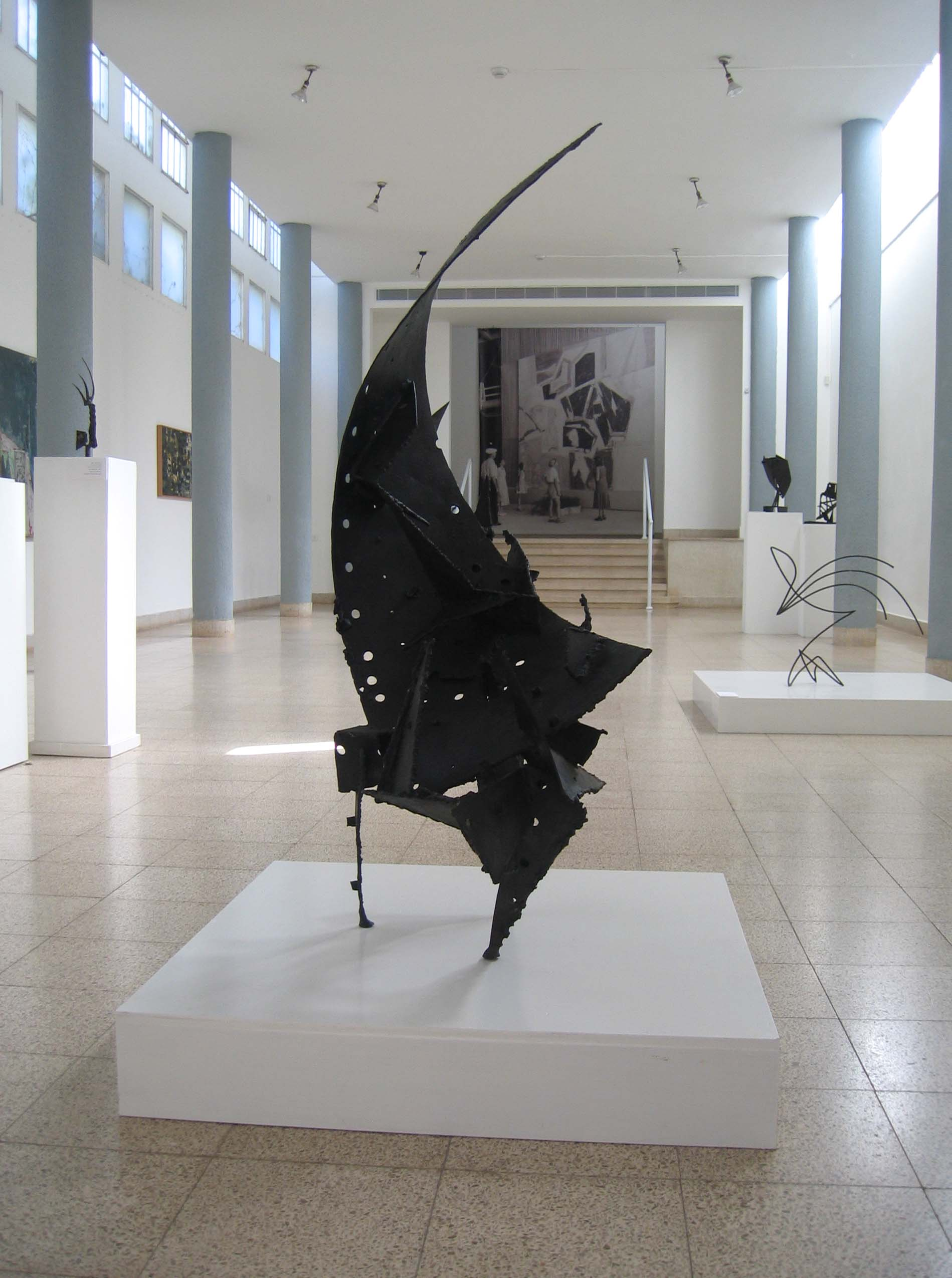
The Burning Bush (1959) by Ithak Danziger

== Haifa Museums conglomerate ==
Other institutions under the auspices of the Haifa Museums include the Mané Katz Museum dedicated to paintings from the School of Paris and Jewish artifacts; and the City Museum of Haifan History, located in the Germany Colony. The Museum of Ancient Art, housed in the university of Haifa, which specializes in archaeological finds discovered in Israel and the Mediterranean basin, was inaugurated in 1984.

Also under the museum's aegis are the Museum of Prehistory, the Israeli National Maritime Museum, the Tikotin Museum of Japanese Art and latest addition is Hermann Struck Museum, opened in 2013.

== Controversies ==
=== Ronald McDonald ===
After the museum exhibited a sculpture by Finnish artist Jani Leinonen of Ronald McDonald titled 'McJesus,' , Haifa's Arab Christian community protested and tried to enter the museum to remove it. The museum was firebombed twice between 10 and 11 January while local Christians threw stones at the police outside the museum and injured three officers.

== See also ==
- List of museums in Israel
