= Smadar Sheffi =

Israeli art critic

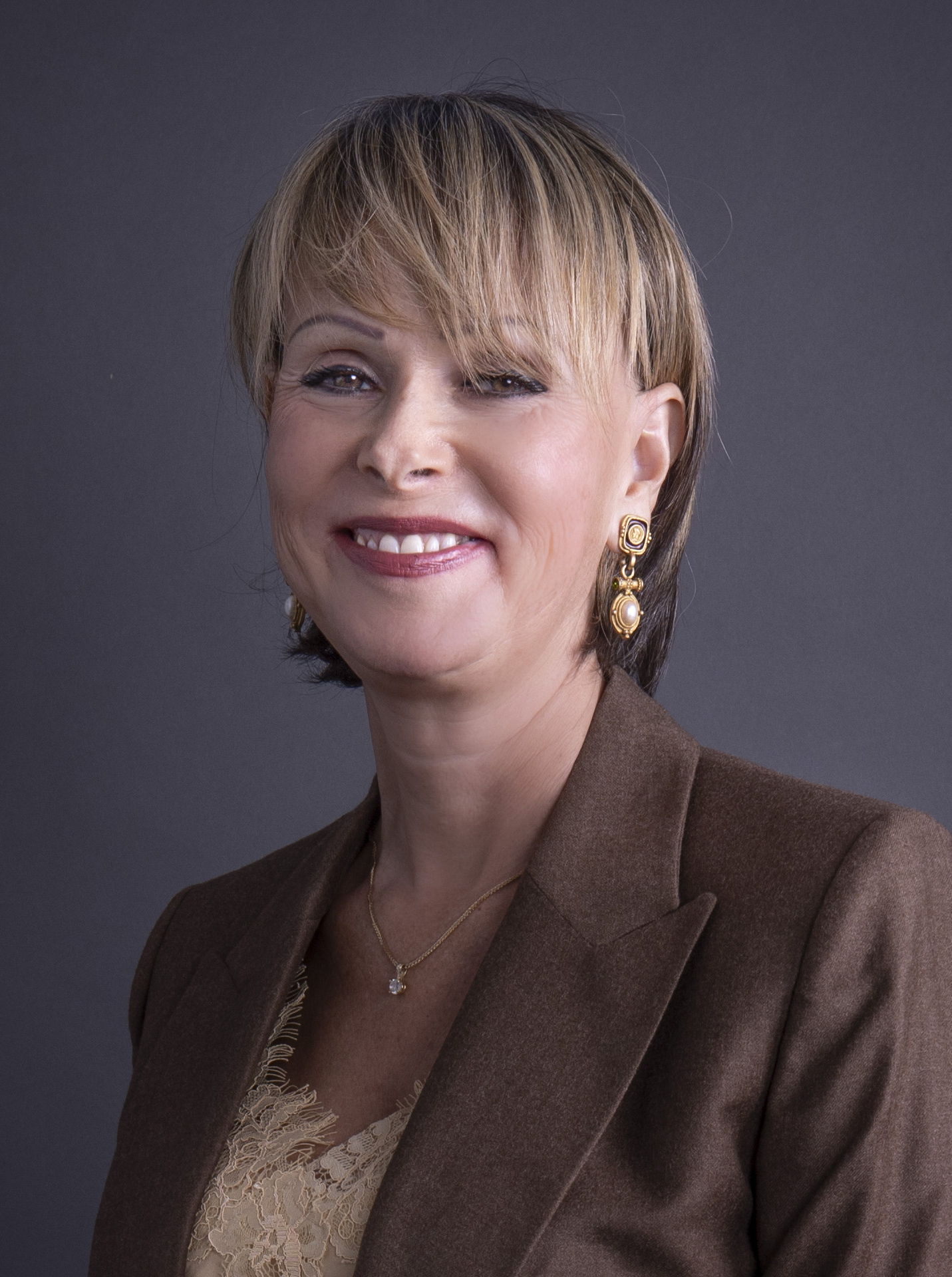
- Born: 1963 (age 62–63)
- Education: Hebrew University
- Occupations: Critic, Curator
- Writing career
- Genre: Contemporary art
- Subject: Art

Smadar Sheffi (Hebrew: סמדר שפי) is an art critic, researcher of art and culture, and a curator of contemporary art. She founded the Contemporary Art Center, Ramle – CACR (2019 - 2024) and was the Chief Curator. She specializes in curating exhibitions in historical venues, such as the Bialik House Museum in Tel Aviv, Jerusalem Artists House, Contemporary Art Center, Ramla - CACR, and the Pool of Arches, Ramla. Sheffi's bilingual blog of art criticism and notes on contemporary culture, The Window, has been active since 2012.

== Biography ==
Smadar Sheffi holds a Ph.D. in Art History from the Hebrew University of Jerusalem. Her doctoral dissertation, "From Vienna to Jerusalem: Forgotten portraits by Grete Wolf Krakauer", was written under the direction of Gannit Ankori. Since 2018 Sheffi has been a lecturer at the COLLMAN - College of Management Academic Studies, Rishon Lezion. She is a past lecturer at the Tel Aviv University, Hebrew University of Jerusalem, and the Institute for Israeli Art. Her research interests include representations of the Holocaust in contemporary art, Israeli art and Modernism.

Since 2013 Sheffi is the contemporary art curator of the Bialik Museum in Tel Aviv. In 2023, the book Art. Bialik. was published by the Municipality of Tel Aviv-Yafo on the occasion of the 150th centennial events marking the birth of the national poet. The book is a compilation of the exhibitions from 2013 to 2023 and an anthology of the writings by Bialik that inspired them.

Sheffi was the chief curator of the CACR – Contemporary Art Center Ramla, an art initiative she launched in 2019. The curatorial program she led welcomed difference and multiple viewpoints as core values, addressing issues of diversity and civil society as reflected in contemporary Israeli art.

Since 2024, she has been editing and curating an annual literature–art project in collaboration with the Institut français in Tel Aviv, focusing on the works of major figures in French literature: Georges Perec in 2024 and Marcel Proust in 2025. Each project comprises a group exhibition of contemporary Israeli art in dialogue with the featured author's work, alongside a public cultural program.

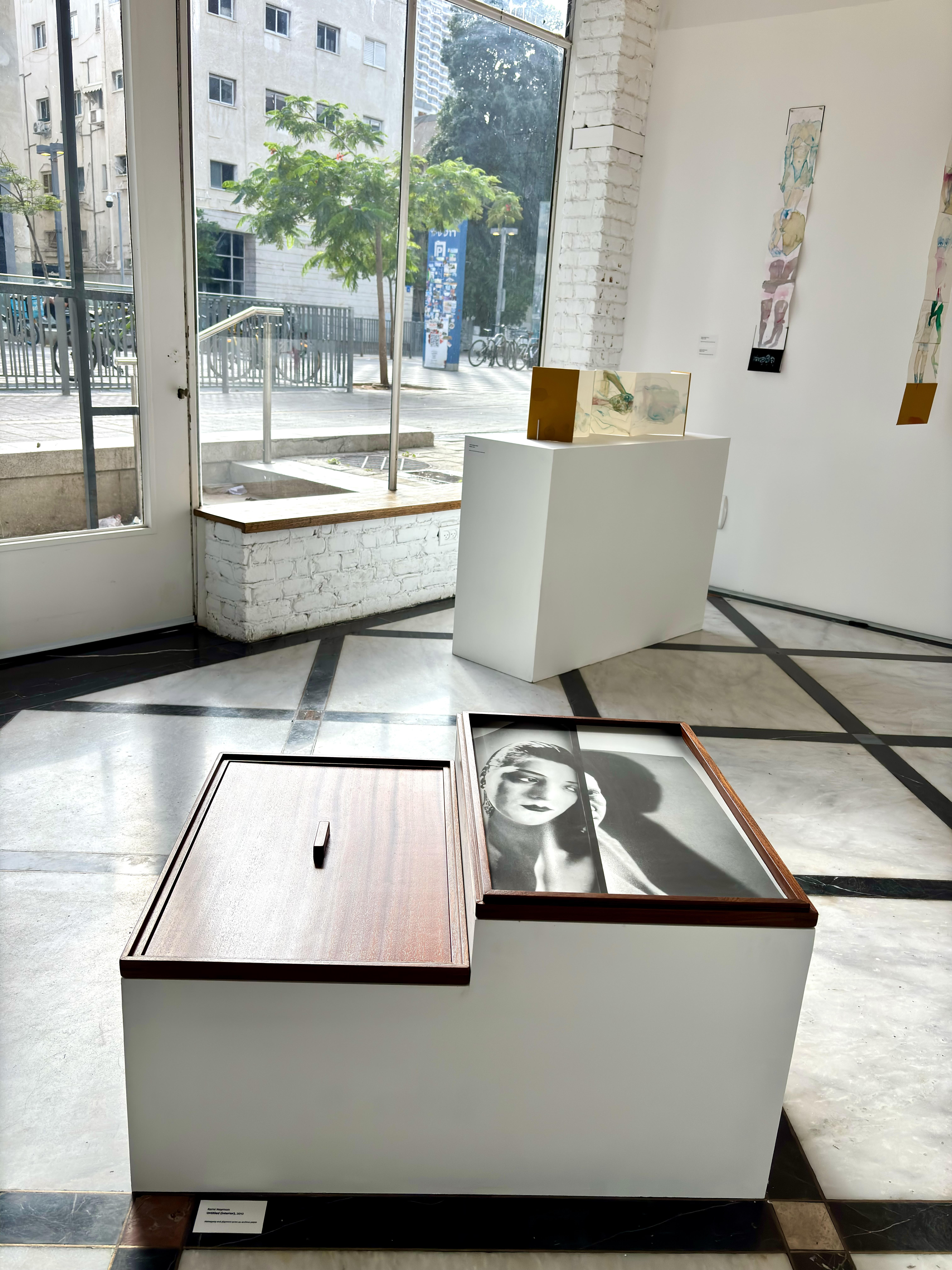
From the project "Proust – Tel Aviv – Proust" 2025

In recent years, she has curated several solo exhibitions for leading artists, including Yoav Weinfeld at the Eretz Israel Museum, Michal Heiman at Mishkenot Sha'ananim as part of the opening events of the International Writers Festival, and Merav Shin Ben-Alon at Max Liebling House in Tel Aviv.

Sheffi curated two exhibitions in 2023–2024 at the Laurie M. Tisch Gallery at the JCC, Manhattan: "Tales + Textiles" and "Cities and Valleys".

Continuing her research on contemporary Israeli art, Sheffi delivered lectures at the Summer University for Jewish Studies, Hohenems, Austria ("Food in Modern Israeli Art"); The Jewish Museum, Munich ("Reflection on the 'other': The image of the Arab in Israeli Art"); and at the American University, Washington DC at the conference Refugees and Asylum Seekers in Israel ("Portraying states of uprootedness in Israeli art").

Sheffi is frequently interviewed in Israeli Media, was the art critic for Galei Zahal Radio from 2007 to 2023, and for 20 years was the art critic for leading Haaretz. She is the author of numerous catalog articles and gallery texts, an art consultant, and leader of in-depth Israeli and international art tours.

== Curated exhibitions ==
- 2012, New Directions I – Beit Mani, Tel Aviv. (Participating artists: Shay Azoulay, Dana Yoeli, Roy Mordechay, Tali Navon, Yehudit Raviv, Alon Kedem)
- 2013 New Directions II – Beit Mani, Tel Aviv. (Participating artists: Shira Gopstein Moskowitz, Eitan Ben-Moshe, Yair Barak)
- 2014 Simon Adjiashvili, One city, one summer, Gallery Rothschild Fine Art Gallery, Tel Aviv
- 2015 United Colors of Judaica – Eliahou Eric Bokobza – Beit Hatfutsot Museum of the Jewish People Ramat Aviv.
- 2015 Lisa Gross, Turmoil, Tel Aviv Artists' House
- 2016 genius loci, Rothschild Fine Art Gallery Tel Aviv. (Participating artists: Yehuda Armoni, Uri Bleier, Hadar Gad, Tali Navon, Mosh Kashi, Stuart Shils, Eleanor Ray
- 2016 Intricate Affinities: Recollections of Western Tradition in Local Contemporary Art, Petah Tikva Museum of Art. (Participating artists: Amir Shefet, Gili Lavy, Ilana Hamawi, Nadav Naor, Simon Adjiashvili, Sasha Okun, Meydad Eliyahu, Yossi Mark, Mosh Kashi)
- 2017 Partial Portrait: Fragmentation of Identity, Jerusalem Artists' House (Participating artists: Asaf Shaham, Aram Gershuni, Yaron Lapid, Michal Heiman)
- 2018 Grete Wolf Krakauer: From Vienna to Jerusalem, Mishkan Museum of Art, Ein Harod (Guest artists: Gaston Zvi Ickowicz, Anna Yam, Marik Lechner)
- 2019 Adi Oz-Ari: Epidermis, Photo Lab Gallery, Tel Aviv
- 2019 Human Nature: Shared Sensitivities, the Jerusalem Biennale 2019 (Participating artists: Micha Ullman, Vardi Bobrow, David Benarroch, Avner Sher, Pesi Girsch)
- 2019 Things We Remember, CACR – Contemporary Art Center Ramla (Participating artists: Dganit Ben Admon, Mati Elmaliach)
- 2019 Behind the City, CACR – Contemporary Art Center Ramla (Participating artists: Shlomit Fogel, Yehuda Armoni)
- 2019 Beloved, CACR – Contemporary Art Center Ramla (Participating artists: Eliahou Eric Bokobza, Maya Smira)
- 2021 Diana Kogan: "Time didn't exist, Space didn't either", Almacen Gallery, Jaffa
- 2022 Dor Zlekha Levy: "Reflection", installation at the Pool of the Arches, Ramla
- 2022 Meydad Eliyahu, "Copper Wing", CACR – Contemporary Art Center Ramla
- 2023 Nahed Abo Alhega Hamza, Anna Hayat and Slava Pirsky, "Tales + Textiles", the Laurie M. Tisch Gallery at the JCC, Manhattan
- 2024 Eliahou Eric Bokobza, Esther Cohen, "Cities and Valleys", the Laurie M. Tisch Gallery at the JCC, Manhattan
- 2025 Merav Shin Ben-Alon, "Das Israelitische Krankenhaus - The Jewish Hospital", Max Liebling House, Tel Aviv
- 2025 Yoav Weinfeld "Wuthering Heights", Eretz Israel Museum, Tel Aviv
- 2025 Michal Heiman "Punctuation Marks", Mishkenot Sha'ananim, Jerusalem
- 2025 Pesi Girsch, Ruthi Helbitz Cohen and Adi Oz-Ari, "The Black Eye of Midnight – Echoes and Reflections on Else Lasker-Schuler", Felicja Blumental Center, Tel Aviv
- 2013 -, Art Intervention Projects, Beit Bialik Museum, Tel Aviv
- 2018 -, "The Second Floor in Beit Bialik" - a series of site-specific, research-based exhibitions in cooperation with the Bialik Archive
- 2024 -, Annual literature–art project in collaboration with the Institut français in Tel Aviv

== Publications ==
- 2013 - Catalog for solo exhibition by Beverly Barkat
- 2015 - Catalog for solo exhibition by Eric Eliahou Bokobza – United Colors of Judaica
- 2015 - Booklet for solo exhibition by Lisa Gross Turmoil
- 2016 - Exhibition Catalog, Intricate Affinities: Recollections of Western Tradition in Local Contemporary Art, Petach Tikva Museum of Art
- 2018 - Catalog of the exhibition, Grete Wolf Krakauer: From Vienna to Jerusalem
- 2023 - The book Art. Bialik., Bialik Museum, Tel Aviv

== Interviews and podcasts ==
- Interviewed by Goel Pinto, Kan Culture, on "Partial portrait: Fragmentation of identity" (from 1:06:52)
- Podcast on Kan TV with Shiri Lev-Ari "War here, war there", Part 1 and Part 2
- Interview by London et Kirshenbaum 04.04.18 on "Grete Wolf Krakauer: From Vienna to Jerusalem" (from 0:38:04)
- Interview on Grete Wolf Krakauer, "Eretz Vateva" Magazine, #181 "Aliya" (June 2018)
- Interview with Goel Pinto, Kan Culture, on 'Me and you' - Checks and balances inspired by H.N. Bialik's poem 'See Saw' (from 1:01:34)
- Lecture at the Annual Conference of the Association of Israeli Archivists, about the Second Floor in Beit Bialik series
- Lecture at the Institute for Israeli Art at the Academic College of Tel Aviv-Yafo, about Pesi Girsch
- Appearance in an item in the art and culture magazine of "Kan 11" about "Beloved" (from 10:53)
