= Krakouer =

Kracauer, Krakauer, or Krakouer is a German-language surname, a demonym for a person from the Polish city Kraków (German: Krakau). Notable people with the surname include:

- Andrew Krakouer (1983–2025), Australian footballer
- Andrew L. Krakouer (born 1971), Australian footballer
- Boris Krakover (1919–1999), Argentinian photographer, photojournalist, and tango composer
- David Krakauer (musician) (born 1956), American clarinetist
- David Krakauer (scientist) (born 1967), American evolutionary biologist
- Grete Wolf Krakauer (1890–1970), Austrian-Israeli artist
- Jim Krakouer (born 1958), Australian footballer
- John Krakauer, American neurologist
- Jon Krakauer (born 1954), American author and mountaineer
- José Krakover (1880–1957) Argentinian pioneer of the profession of phitography
- Leopold Krakauer (1890–1954), architect and painter
- Nathan Krakouer (born 1988), Australian footballer
- Phil Krakouer (born 1960), Australian footballer
- Shaul Krakover (born 1947), Israeli geographer
- Siegfried Kracauer (1889–1966), German journalist, sociologist, film critic, and author
