= Anita De Bauch =

English model (born 1986)

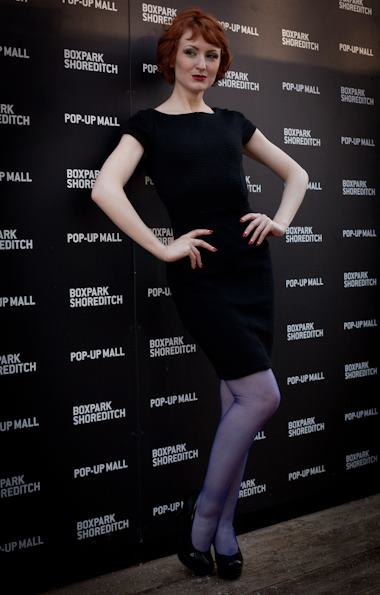
- Anita De Bauch at the Playful Promises fashion show in London, February 2012
- Born: 15 January 1986 (age 40)
- Occupation: Model
- Modeling information
- Height: 5 ft 7 in (1.70 m)
- Hair color: Red
- Eye color: Blue

Anita De Bauch (born 15 January 1986) is the professional name used by an English model from London, England.

De Bauch started modelling in 2004 for her hair extensions business (which closed in 2008) but did not model for other clients until 2007, when she graduated from Lancaster University with an upper second Bachelor of Science degree in psychology.

De Bauch began modelling for British photographers in 2006 and for bespoke corset company Heavenly Corsets in 2007, appearing in full-page advertisements for the company in the December 2007 and January 2008 issues of Scarlet.

Since 2007 she has modelled internationally for various latex clothing and other clothing and lingerie designers and appeared at such fashion shows as the Skin Two Rubber Ball and opening the show at London Alternative Fashion Week 2010, an event that annually raises money for various charitable organisations. De Bauch starred in the Vivienne Westwood/Dans La Vie fashion film Oyster (director: Marie Schuller), which premiered in London on 15 April 2012. Bizarre described her as "bewitching, imaginative, zany, avant-garde, retro, radical and elegant" and a "sizzling siren" in an interview given in 2008 under the pseudonym Chic Freak, and more recently as a "sex bomb".

De Bauch has appeared on several covers including the international mail order catalogue for global photographic brand Quantum, Alt fashion magazine, on several pages of fetish fashion photographer Emma Delves-Broughton's coffee table book Kinky Nature, in clothing catalogues, music videos, album covers, various nightclub advertisements, calendars and on Fashion TV for vintage lingerie brand Playful Promises. She is as well known for her art nude and pin-up as her fashion work and is also one of the most popular alternative models of all time, according to Bizarre. In August 2011, Skin Two reported De Bauch to be "one of the world’s top fetish models".

The book Anita De Bauch by photographer Seán McCormack, consists of 21 pages of colour fashion and nude photographs of De Bauch, was self-published in February 2011 using Lulu. In 2012, McCormack released a follow-up titled Anita De Bauch: Chameleon, with 72 pages of colour latex and nude photographs.

Anita De Bauch is the author of The "Ugly" Girl's Guide to Modelling, which was published in hardback and paperback form by New Haven in 2015. The book is a five-step guide to beginning, maintaining and improving a career as a freelance female model.

She has two Sphynx cats, named Dexter and Lilith.
