= Mosher =

Mosher may refer to:

== People ==
- Bob Mosher (1915–1972), American scriptwriter
- Charles Adams Mosher (1906–1984), American Congressman
- Edward Mosher, software developer (see Standard Generalized Markup Language)
- Clelia Duel Mosher (1863–1940), author
- Eliza Maria Mosher (1846–1928), American physician, educator, medical writer, inventor
- Frederick C. Mosher (1913–1990), academic
- Gene Mosher, author of the first graphical point of sale software
- Gregory Mosher (born 1949), stage and film director
- Harry Stone Mosher (1915-2001), chemist
- Howard Frank Mosher (1942–2017), author
- James Mosher (born 1984), American visual artist
- John Mosher (1928–1998), jazz double Bassist
- John Mosher (writer) (1892–1942), writer and film critic
- Ken Mosher, a guitarist with American indie band The Never
- Lafayette F. Mosher (1824–1894), U.S. politician and judge
- Leah Mosher, pilot in the Royal Canadian Air Force
- Loren Mosher (1933–2004), psychiatrist
- Louis C. Mosher (1880–1958), Philippine–American War Medal of Honor recipient
- Samuel B. Mosher (1892–1970), American oil entrepreneur, industrialist and horticulturalist
- Scott Mosher (born 1973), field hockey player
- Sharon Mosher, American geologist
- Steven W. Mosher (born 1948), political author
- Terry Mosher (born 1942), cartoonist
- Thomas Bird Mosher (1852–1923), publisher

== Places ==
- Mosher, Baltimore, Maryland, a neighborhood in the United States
- Mosher, South Dakota, an unincorporated community

== See also ==
- John Mosher Bailey (1838–1916), US Congressman
- Alfred Mosher Butts (1899–1993), inventor of Scrabble
- Moshing, a type of dance
- Mosh (disambiguation)
