= Moch =

Moch may refer to:

== Places ==
- Moch, Federated States of Micronesia, an island and municipality

== People ==
- Moch, Palatine of Hungary (12–13th century), Hungarian lord
- Cheryl Moch, American writer
- Dontay Moch (born 1988), American football player
- Gaston Moch (1859–1935), French activist
- Jules Moch (1893–1985), French politician
- Manfred Moch (1930–2011), German musician
- Robert Moch (1914–2005), American rower

== See also ==
- Johannes Mötsch (born 1949), German historian
- Mosh (disambiguation)
