= Mosh (disambiguation) =

Moshing is a form of concert dancing.

Mosh or MOSH may also refer to:

== Science and technology ==
- Mineral oil saturated hydrocarbon; see Petroleum jelly
- Mosh (software), an Internet remote terminal application
- MOSH (Nokia), Nokia's content-sharing site

== Organizations ==
- Maryland Occupational Safety and Health, a division of the Maryland Department of Labor, Licensing and Regulation, US
- Memphis Museums of Science and History (MoSH), Tennessee, US
- MOSH Mobile, a former mobile virtual network operator
- Museum of Science and History, in Jacksonville, Florida, US

== People ==
- Mosh (wrestler) (1971), professional wrestler
- Mosh (model) (born 1989), Russian-American alternative model and burlesque performer
- Mosh Ben-Ari (Moshe "Mosh" Ben Ari; born 1970), Israeli musician
- Mosh Kashi (born 1966), Israeli painter

== Other uses ==
- "Mosh" (song), a song by Eminem

== See also ==
- Mosh BMX, a sub-brand of Giant Bicycles
