= Hadar Gad =

Israeli artist (born 1960)

Hadar Gad הדר גד
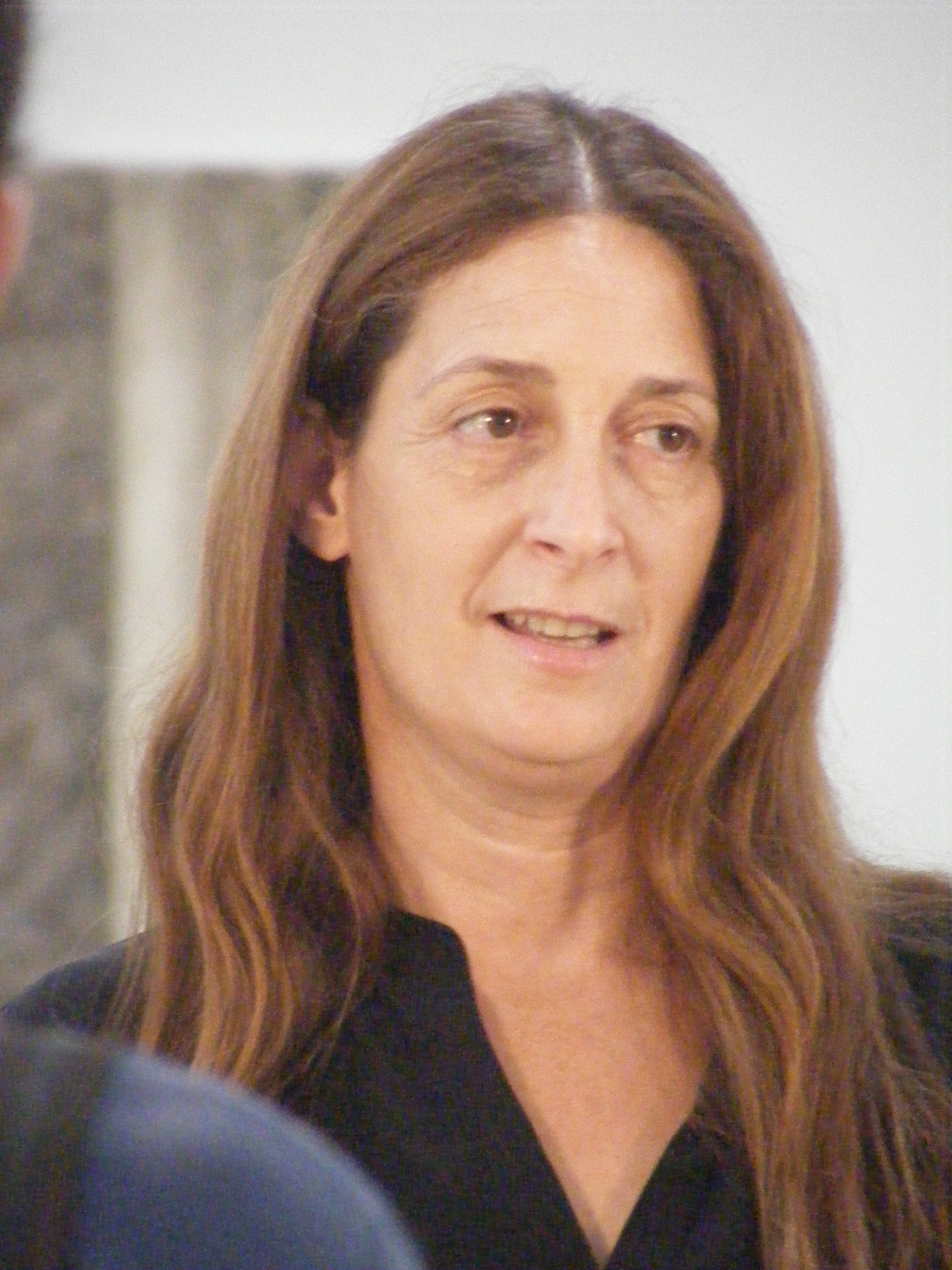
- Born: 1960 (age 65–66); Ein Harod
- Education: Académie de la Grande Chaumière; Avni Institute of Art and Design
- Occupation: Artist

Hadar Gad (Hebrew: הדר גד; born 1960) is an Israeli artist.

== Biography ==
Hadar Gad was born in kibbutz Ein Harod Meuhad, and raised in Beersheba and kibbutz Karmia. She studied at the Académie de la Grande Chaumière, Paris, from 1981 to 1983, and at the Avni Institute of Art and Design, Tel Aviv, from 1983 to 1987. There she practiced printmaking technique, specializing in engraving. In the years 1984, 1985 and 1986 she received scholarships from the Israeli Ministry of Education. After graduation she worked as an assistant in The Etching Workshop Tel Aviv Artists House. In 2016 she was the recipient of The Ministry of Culture Award from the Ministry of Culture and Sport, Israel. In 2024, she was awarded the Plumas Art Foundation grant.

Gad has taught painting and drawing in several places over the years, including the Meyerhoff Art Center, Tel Aviv Museum of Art. As of 2022 she is the art curator in “Hamussach”, the National Library of Israel literature and art journal. She operates as the head of the art department at the Collaborative Art Center – Givat Haviva.

== Art career ==
In a 2011's solo exhibition at the Rothschild Fine Art Gallery Gad presented interior paintings focusing on the most mundane objects such as scattered underwear, a saucer with used tea bags, and a sink full of dishes. In the paintings, the objects were transformed into sites of pain and joy, personal memory, containing within themselves those experiences. In another series which deals with objects apparently trivial but symbolic, like a salt shaker paired with the words "salt of the earth," an antique silver platter with bills and coins, a milk carton and jar of honey from Pardes Hanna placed on a small map of Israel, portions of gefilte fish on porcelain plates. Irena Gordon, the curator, describe her works as both ironic and lyrical, and created a portrait of "Israeliness" through a precise and witty "I."

Starting 2007 for an eleven-year period Gad visited the Jezreel Valley cemeteries on a weekly basis and created a series of painting, notably of the cemetery of Kibbutz Ein Harod, where she was born and both her grandparents, Arieh Gad and Esther Budko, sister of artist Joseph Budko are buried. The works are generally associated with the myth of the Kibbutz, the ethos of the pioneers, and the place of graveyards, mourning and remembrance in early Israeli society. Gad's own correspondence with death and memory is joined with a pursuit for beauty and redemption. In 2009 she exhibited a collection of her works on the subject in "Block, Section, Row", a solo show at the Mishkan Museum of Art.

Gad exhibited a series of Pardes (orchard) paintings in a solo exhibition at the Rothschild Fine Art Gallery in 2012. This is the orchard rooted in her memories from childhood visits to Ein Harod. She has been painting at Ein Harod's first cemetery, located in Gidona at the foot of the Mount Gilboa, and at the cemetery of Ein Harod Meuchad. At the same time she describes landscape of the Jezreel Valley as they spread below the Kumi Hill, at whose foot lies the kibbutz.

Gad exhibited her single show “Red” at the Rothschild Fine Art Gallery, Tel Aviv in 2017. The paintings are series of Kibbutz Ein Harod and Sha'ar Menashe mental health center. Kibbutz Ein Harod lies in the very heart of the Israeli consensus, while Sha’ar Menashe is the rejected and repressed. Gad sketches in pencil on the red oil canvases and uses a utility knife, referred to as a Japanese knife in Hebrew, to create her works, occasionally adding yellow to the red and creates an impression of internal combustion. The red symbolizes warning, signaling threat. Light being a metaphorical good, whether in religion or politics.

Gad participated in “Afterlives”, an exhibition at the Jewish Museum, Manhattan, in 2021/2022. The show explored looted art by the Nazis during World War II, some of which that was recovered and returned to their rightful owners or museums. Gad was one of a four contemporary artists that were commissioned to address the subject. Based on archival photographs of the ruins of a Jewish assets whether of religious dwellings or objects of the minds such as books and drawings, Gad created large works that examine the relation between memory and place. She was also influenced in part by her uncle involvement in the Second Polish Republic, and depict the Great Synagogue that existed in the Free City of Danzig and was demolished in May 1939.

== Gallery ==
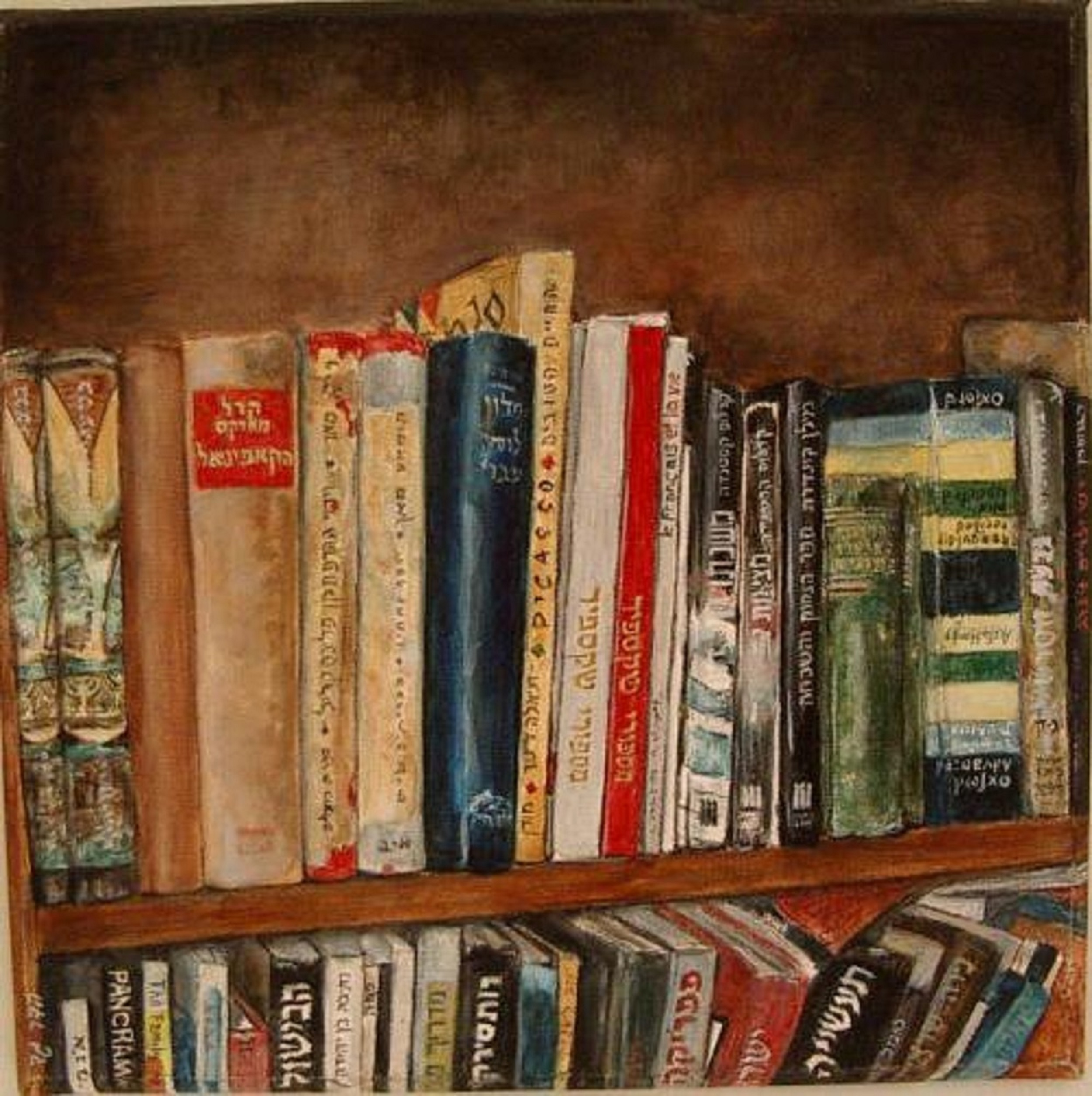
Interior series, oil on canvas, 30x30, 2000

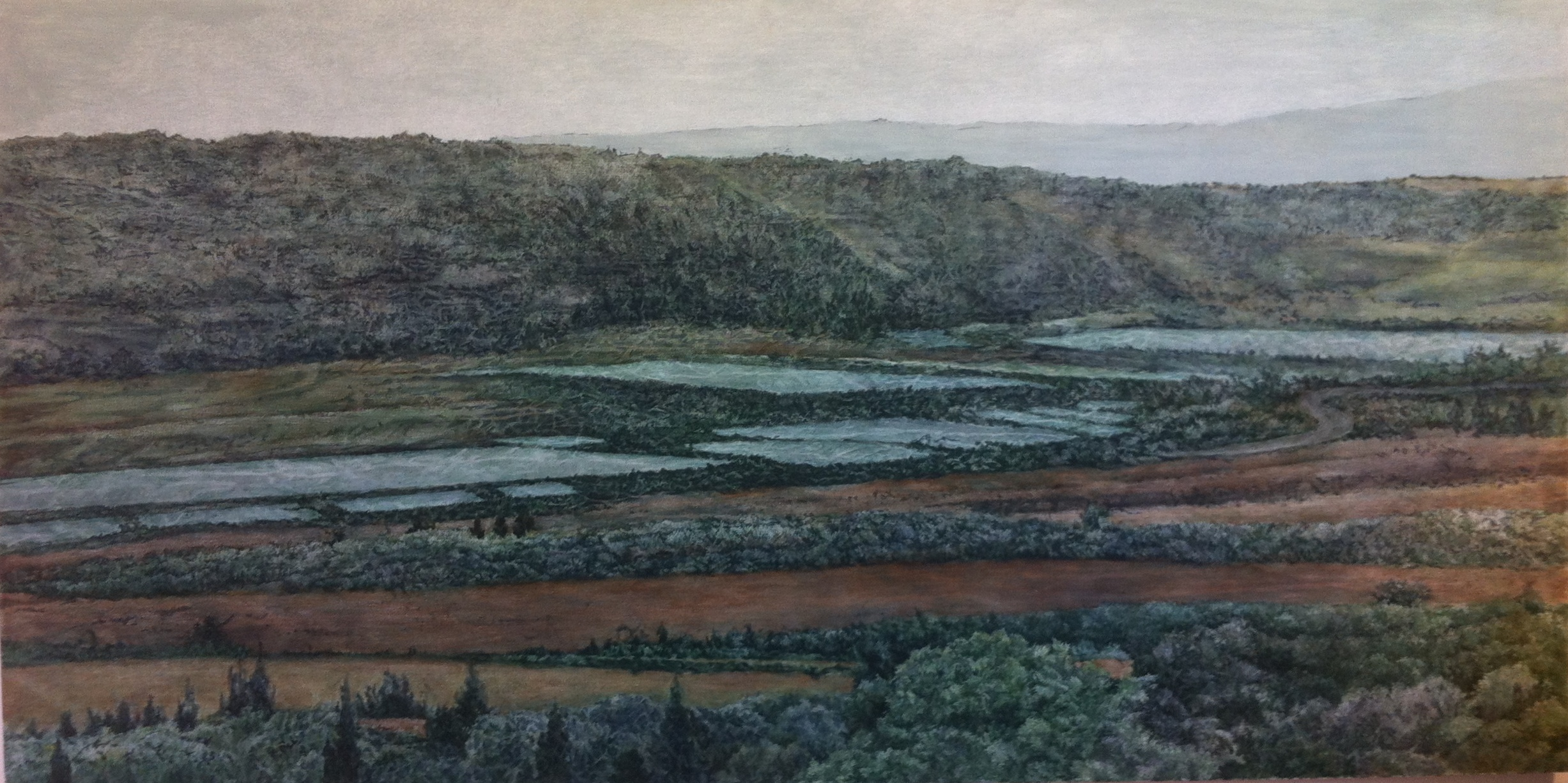
Kumi, oil on canvas, 100x200, 2012

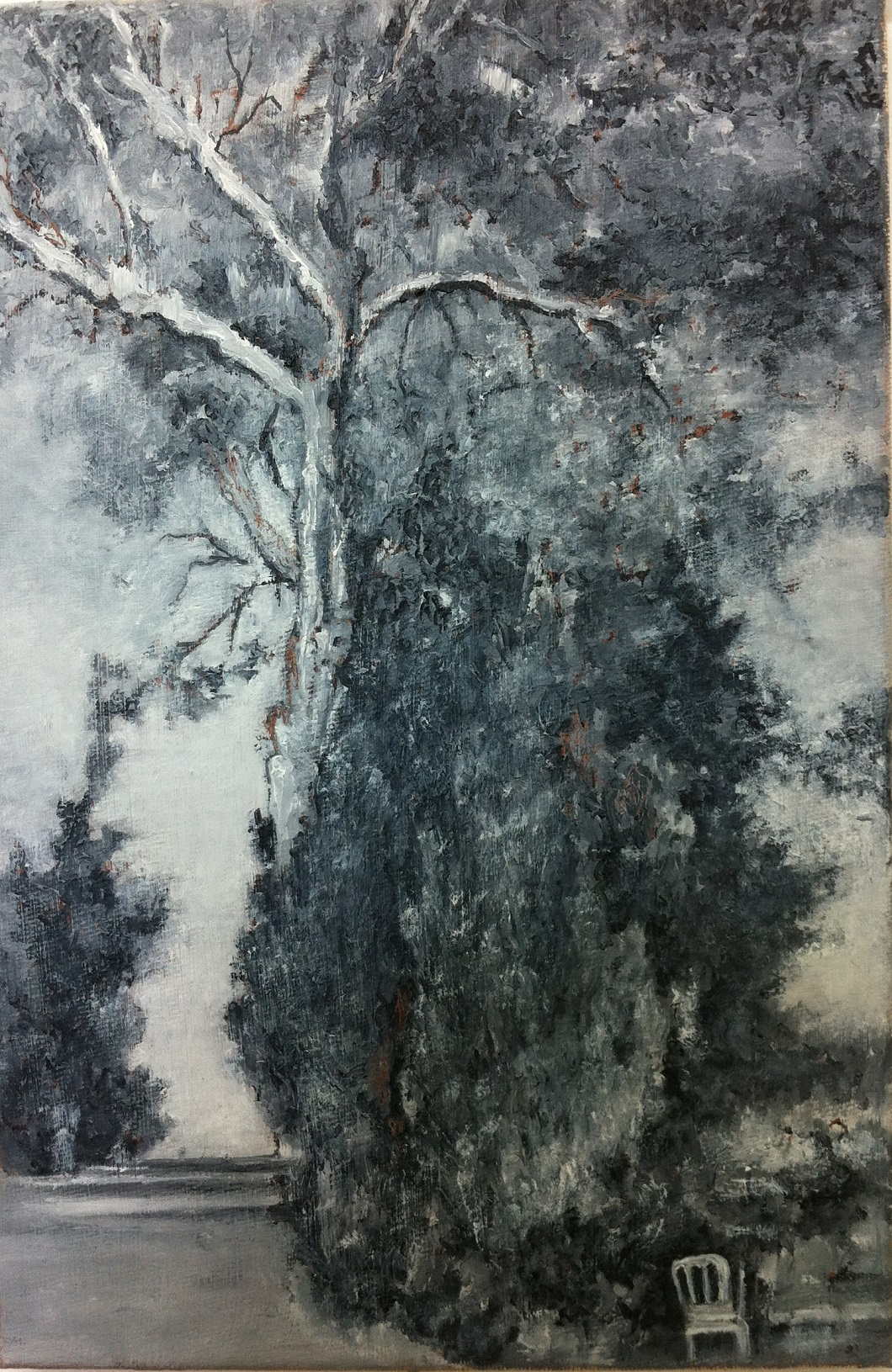
Ein Harod, oil on canvas, 30x20, 2013

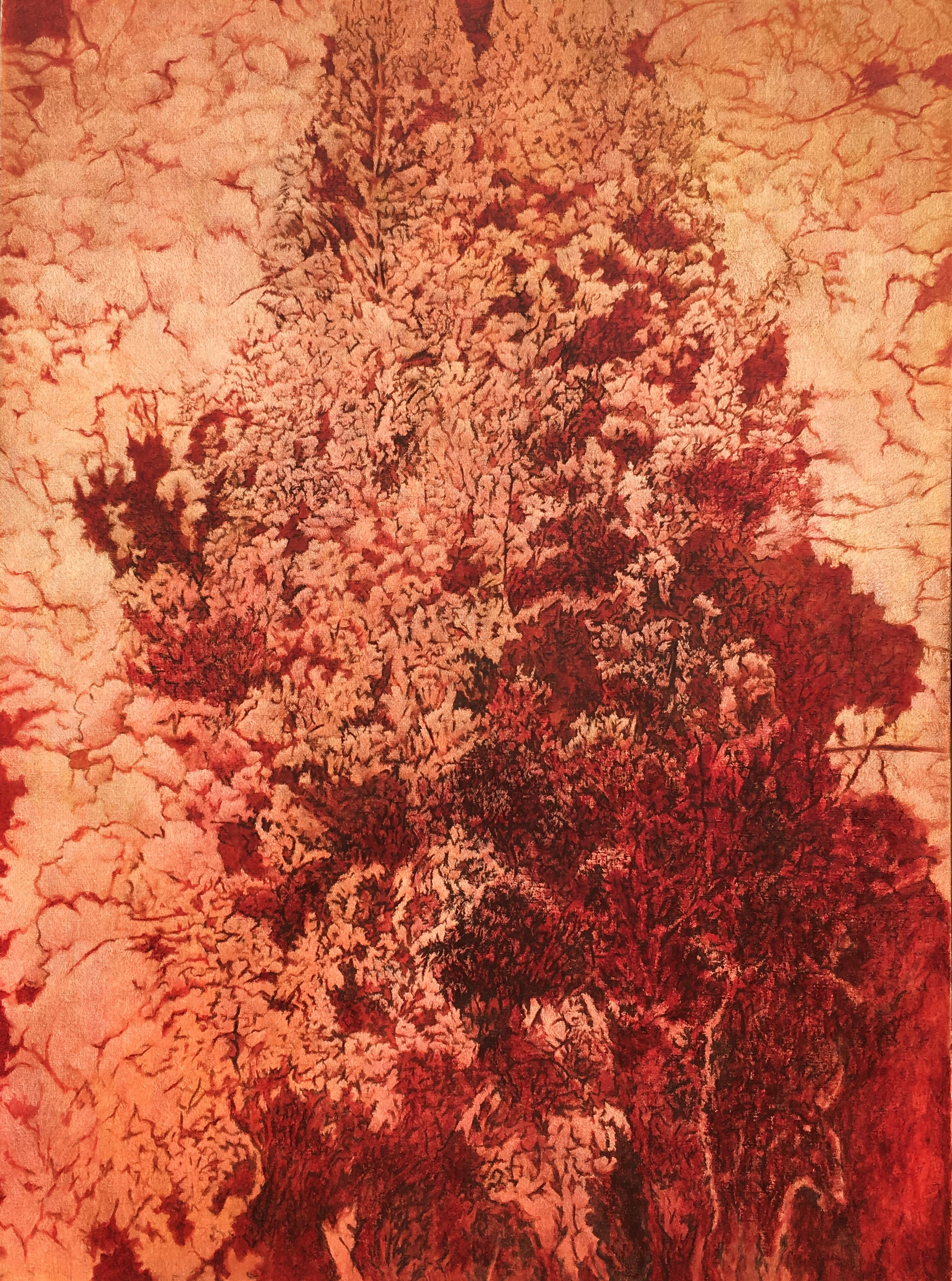
Red series, oil on canvas, 196x145, 2017

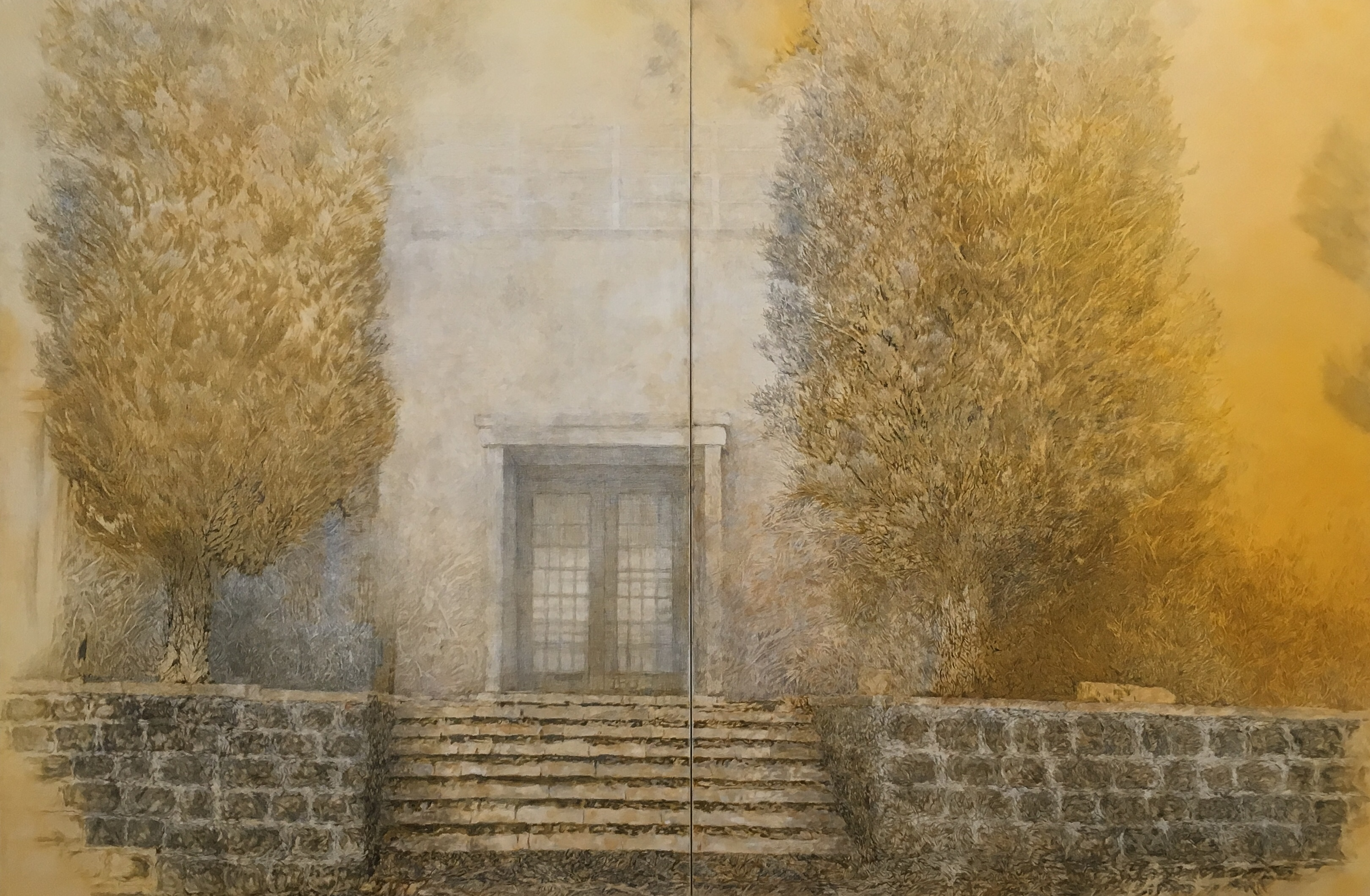
Ein Harod, oil and pencil on cavass, Diptych, 200x300, 2018–19

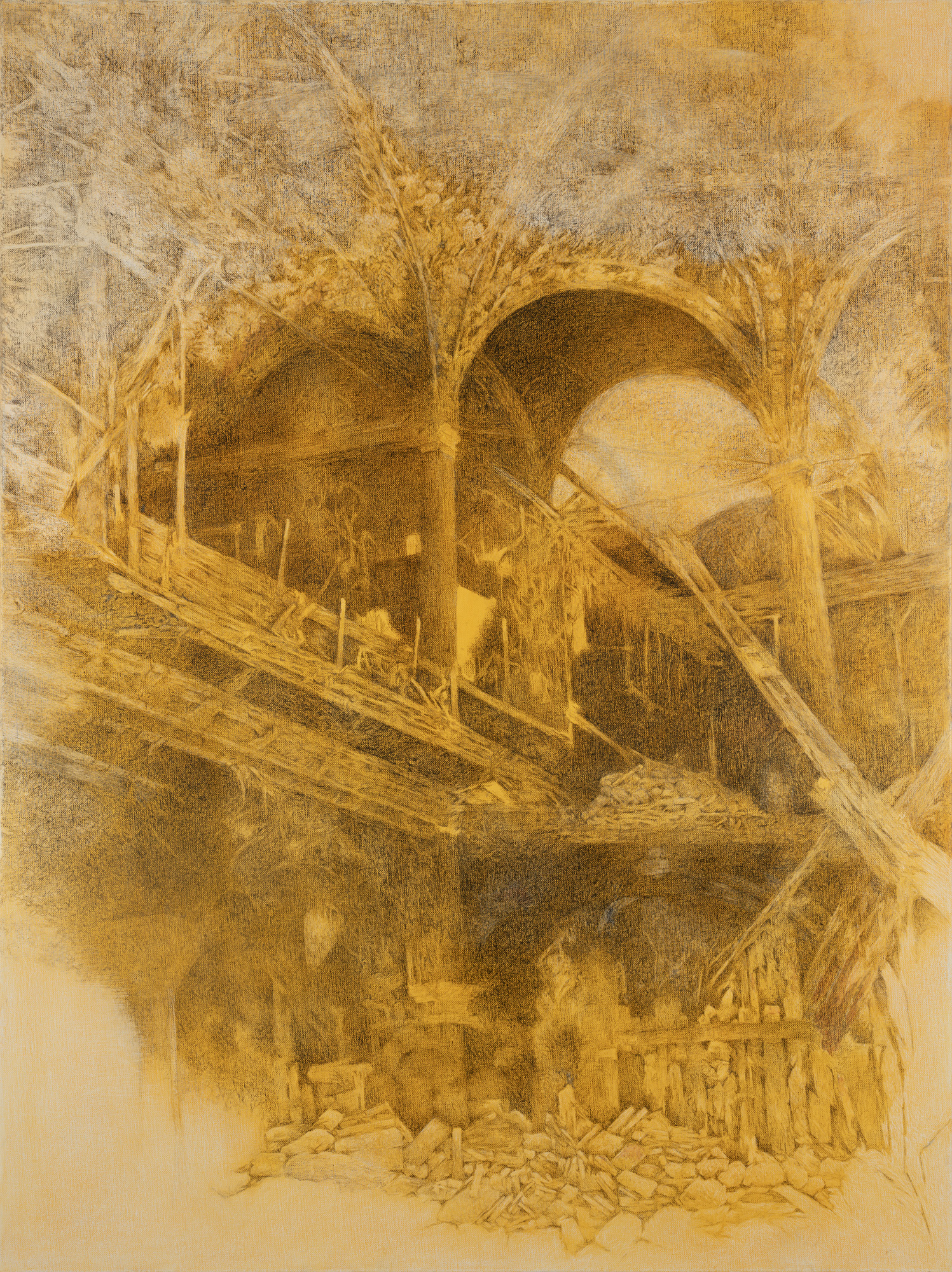
Polish Landscape, 200x150, 2020

== Solo exhibitions ==
- 2024 "Close to There", Maanit Gallery, Kibbutz Ma'anit. Curator: Tamar Dichter.
- 2024 "Land Distance", Lohamei Ha'Getaot Gallery, Kibbutz Lohamei HaGeta'ot. Curators: Michal Horovitz, Koby Sibony.
- 2022 “Intolerable Beauty”, Rothschild Fine Art Gallery, Tel Aviv, Israel. Curated by Smadar Sheffi.
- 2021 "Afterlives: Recovering the Lost Stories of Looted Art" project commissioned by The Jewish Museum, New York City. Curated by Darsie Alexander and Sam Sackeroff.
- 2020 Bar-David Museum, Baram, Israel. Curated by Avi Ifargan
- ”14 Interpretations: Portrait of a Museum", Mishkan Museum of Art, Ein Harod, Israel. Curated by Yaniv Shapira
- 2019 “The canvas is white also from within”, The Apter Barrer Gallery & Art Center, Ma'alot-Tarshiha, Israel. Curated by Naama Haikin, (catalogue)
- 2017 “Red”, Rothschild Fine Art Gallery, Tel Aviv, Israel. Curated by Smadar Sheffi
- 2014 ART Karlsruhe, Karlsruhe, Germany (catalogue)
- 2013 Givat-Haim Gallery, Israel. Curated by Vered Nahmani
- 2013 “Tow Years”, Dwek Gallery, Jerusalem, Israel.
- 2012 Rothschild Fine Art Gallery, Tel Aviv, Israel
- 2011 Breisach, Freiburg, Germany,
- 2011 Rothschild Fine Art Gallery, Tel Aviv, Israel
- 2009 "Block, Section, Row", Museum of Art, Ein Harod, Israel. Curated by Galia Bar-Or (catalogue)
- 2008 “Chapters from a Diary”, Shalom Tower Art Gallery, Tel-Aviv, Israel. Curated by David Sharir (catalogue)
- 2007 Rodeo Drive private space, Beverly Hills, CA, United States
- 2005 International artists exhibition, Grasse, France
- 2004 Aykis Gallery, Tel-Aviv, Israel (catalogue)
- 2001 “Inner Space”, Opal Gallery, Tel-Aviv, Israel (catalogue)
- 1994 Sharet Institute, Givatayim, Israel
- 1993 Art-Center, Hadera, Israel
- 1991 Vital Gallery, Tel-Aviv, Israel
- 1991 Mishkan Museum of Artd, Israel, Curated by Galia Bar-Or

== Group exhibitions ==
- 2026 “The Movement: The Kibbutz in Israeli Art”, Ramat Gan Museum of Israeli Art, Curator: Yaniv Shapira.
- 2025 “The Binah movement”, ZUZU Gallery, Israel. Curator: Rotem Ritov.
- 2025 “Mom not really dead”, Minshar Gallery Tel Aviv, Israel. Curator: Nurit Tal-Tene.
- 2025 “Translating Darkness into Signs of Light”, The Artists; House Gallery, Tel Aviv, Israel. Curators: Dalia Danon.
- 2024 “The Split”, Sturman Museum, Ein-Harod, Israel. Curator: Ofra Baram.
- 2022 “In Search of Lost Memory”, Bar-David Museum, Bar'am, Israel. Curator: Sorin Heller.
- 2022 “The Institution”, Ramat Gan Museum of Israeli Art, curator: Svetlana Reingold.
- 2019 "Seeds of the Land", Israel Museum Ticho House, Jerusalem. Curated by Tamar Manor-Friedman. (catalogue)
- 2018 "Glorious Valley" Beit Hankin Gallery, Kfar Yehoshua, Israel. Curated by Neta Habar and Orna Etkin (catalogue).
- 2018 "Local Legend", Afula City Gallery, Afula, Israel. Curated by Oz Zaluf
- 2018 “Treasures of the Mishkan Museum of Art”, Mishkan Museum of Art. Curated by Yaniv Shapira.
- 2018 “Once upon a time there was me”, ZUZU Gallery, Israel. Curator: Rotem Ritov.
- 2018 “Pain.ting Landscape”, The Artists House, Tel Aviv, Israel. Curated by Ruthi Hinski and Ruth Marcus (catalogue).
- 2018 “Gadish”, Beit Hankin Gallery, Kfar Yehoshua, Israel. Curated by Idit Levavy and Neta Haber
- 2017 “We Hereby Declare: 2016 Ministry of Culture Awards for Visual Art and Design", MoBY - Museums of Bat Yam, Israel. Curated by Joshua Simon (catalogue)
- 2017 “BRB”, Zadik Gallery, Jaffa, Israel (catalogue)
- 2017 “Kubya Salon”, Kubya Gallery, Jerusalem, Israel
- 2017 “Mezer-Meisser”, Ein-Shemer, Israel.
- 2017 “Paintings Camp 2016: Activists", Negev Museum of Art, Israel. Curated by David Vakshtain
- 2016 “Genius Loci”, Rothschild Gallery, Tel Aviv, Israel. Curated by Smadar Sheffi
- 2015 “On the face”, Zadik Gallery, Jaffa, Israel. Curated by Hanna Koman (catalogue)
- 2015 "Ten Meters Over Sea Level”, Maz"e, Tel Aviv, Israel. Curated by Smadar Shefi
- 2015 "Israeli Forest?! between memory and escapism" The Art Workshop, Yavne, Israel. Curated by Bat-Sheva Granit.
- 2014 "Money” Zadik Gallery, Jaffa, Israel. Curated by Hanna Koman
- 2013 “Poket-Landscapes”, P8 Gallery, Tel Aviv, Israel. Curated by Ron Bartos.
- 2012 “Conversations", Dwek Gallery, Jerusalem, Israel. Curated by Irena Gordon.
- 2012 “On the line", Stern Gallery, Tel Aviv, Israel.
- 2012 “Bezeir Anpin", Zadik Gallery, Jaffa, Israel. Curated by Hanna Koman.
- 2011 Group drawings exhibition, Rothschild Gallery, Tel Aviv, Israel.
- 2011 “What's in a landscape? ", Stern Gallery, Tel Aviv, Israel. Curated by Debby Luzia.
- 2011 “Appropriated Place", Zadik Gallery, Jaffa, Israel. Curated by Hanna Koman.
- 2010 “Objects of Desire", Stern Gallery, Tel Aviv, Israel. Curated by Debby Luzia
- 2009 “Kibbutz”, Gan Shmoel Art Gallery.
- 2005 “Both together and each apart”, Enav Center of Culture, Tel-Aviv, Israel.
- 2005 “Transparencies”, Aykis Gallery, Tel-Aviv, Israel.
- 2005 "House", Raanana, Israel
- 2002 "Peace", Givat-Hviva Gallery, Israel
- 1991-3 International Art print exhibition, Barcelona, Spain (catalogue)
- 1991 International Triennial of art, Krakow, Poland (catalogue)
- 1990 Painters association in Tel-Aviv, Israel
- 1986 Jaffa Museum, Jaffa, Israel

== Collections ==
- The Collection of the Jewish Museum and Pruzan Family Center for Learning, Manhattan, New York City.

== See also ==
- Visual arts in Israel
