= Trude Dothan =

Austrian-Israeli archaeologist

- טרודה דותן
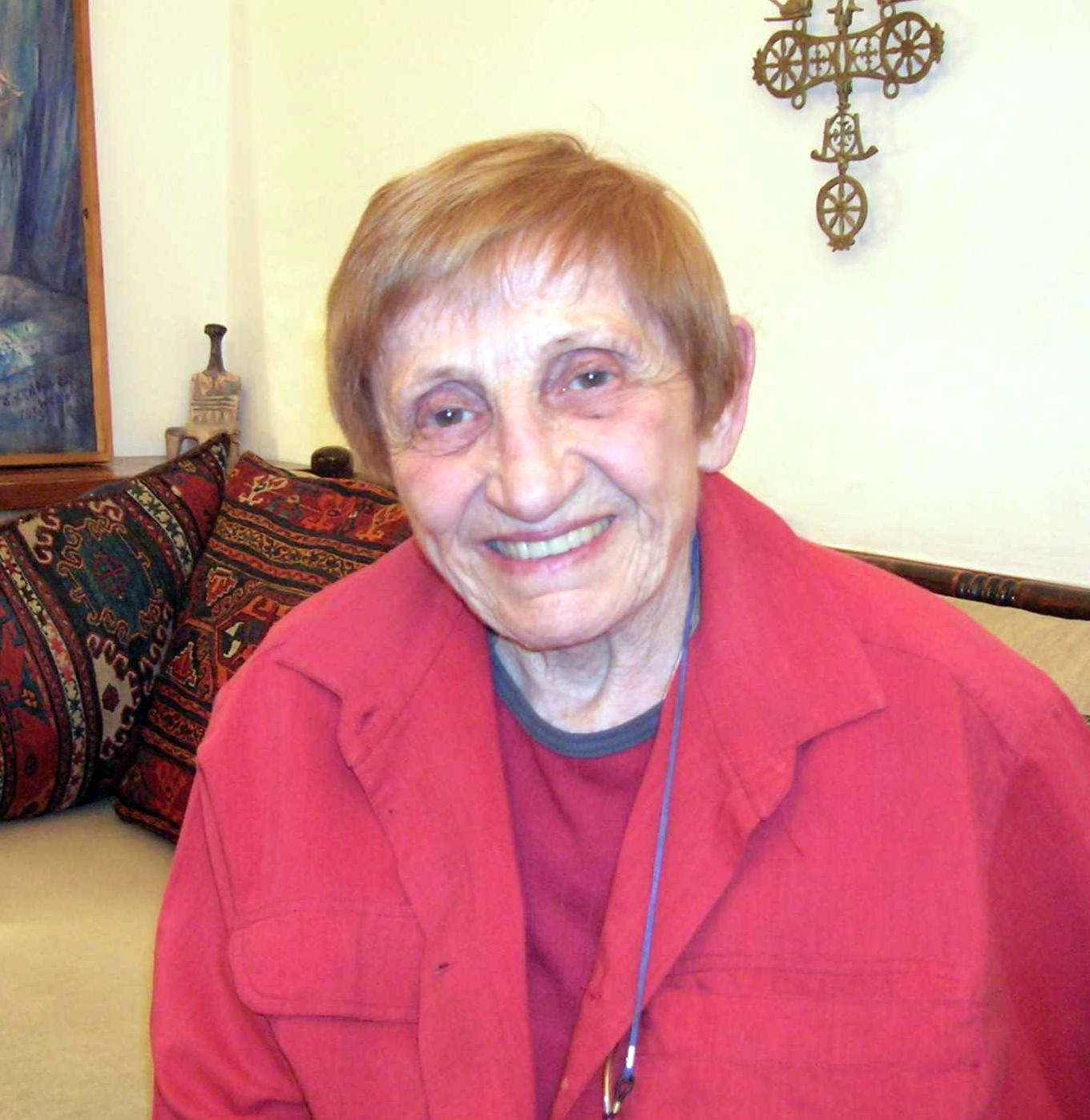
- Born: 12 October 1922; Vienna, Austria
- Died: 28 January 2016 (aged 93); Jerusalem
- Father: Leopold Krakauer

Academic background
- Education: Hebrew University of Jerusalem

Academic work
- Discipline: Archaeologist
- Sub-discipline: Bronze Age and Iron Age
- Institutions: Hebrew University of Jerusalem

Trude Dothan (Hebrew: טרודה דותן; 12 October 1922 – 28 January 2016) was a professor of archaeology at the Hebrew University, who focused on the Late Bronze and Iron Ages in the region, in particular in Philistine culture. Winner of the Israel Prize in Archaeology Research for the year 1998.

== Biography ==
Trude Krakauer (later Dothan) was born in Vienna, the daughter of Grete Wolf Krakauer (née Wolf, 1890–1970), a painter, and Leopold Krakuer, an architect and artist who subsequently designed several Bauhaus-style buildings for Jerusalem's "garden city" of Rehavia. In 1924, Dothan emigrated with her parents to Mandatory Palestine, settling in Jerusalem, where they joined the local community of intellectuals and artists, many of whom were German speakers. She attended the Rehavia Gymnasium for her high school education, and then studied archaeology at the Hebrew University of Jerusalem on Mount Scopus. Her first excavation experience was at Tel Beit Yarah (Khirbet Karak). After serving in the IDF during the War of Independence, Dothan completed her M.A. thesis in 1950 on the pottery at Tel Beit Yerah, which she completed under the guidance of Elazar Lipa Soknik. Another excavation she was involved in at that time was at Tell Qasile, then on the northern outskirts of Tel Aviv, where she first encountered Philistine culture. Dothan's subsequent preoccupation with the Philistines and their relationship with other ancient peoples remained with her and characterised much of her academic work.

Dothan went on to study at both the Oriental Institute of the University of Chicago and the Archaeological Institute at the University of London. At the latter, she encountered the pioneering British woman archaeologist Professor Kathleen Kenyon who influenced her greatly. Dothan later received her doctorate from the Hebrew University in 1961, the topic of the dissertation being "Philistine and Egyptian ceramics in the Land of Israel during the Early Iron Age", completed under the supervision of Professor Benjamin Mazar. Thereafter, Dothan joined the staff of the Archaeological Institute of the Hebrew University in 1962, working there until her retirement in 1992. In 1974 Dothan was appointed full professor and in 1977 made head of the Lauterman Chair for Philistine Archaeology. Between 1977-1982 Dothan headed the Berman Center of Biblical Archaeology and in 1985 she was made professor in the Elazar Lipa Soknik Chair. She served as a guest lecturer and on sabbaticals at the Institute for Advanced Study in Princeton, New York University, Harvard University, Columbia University and Brown University.

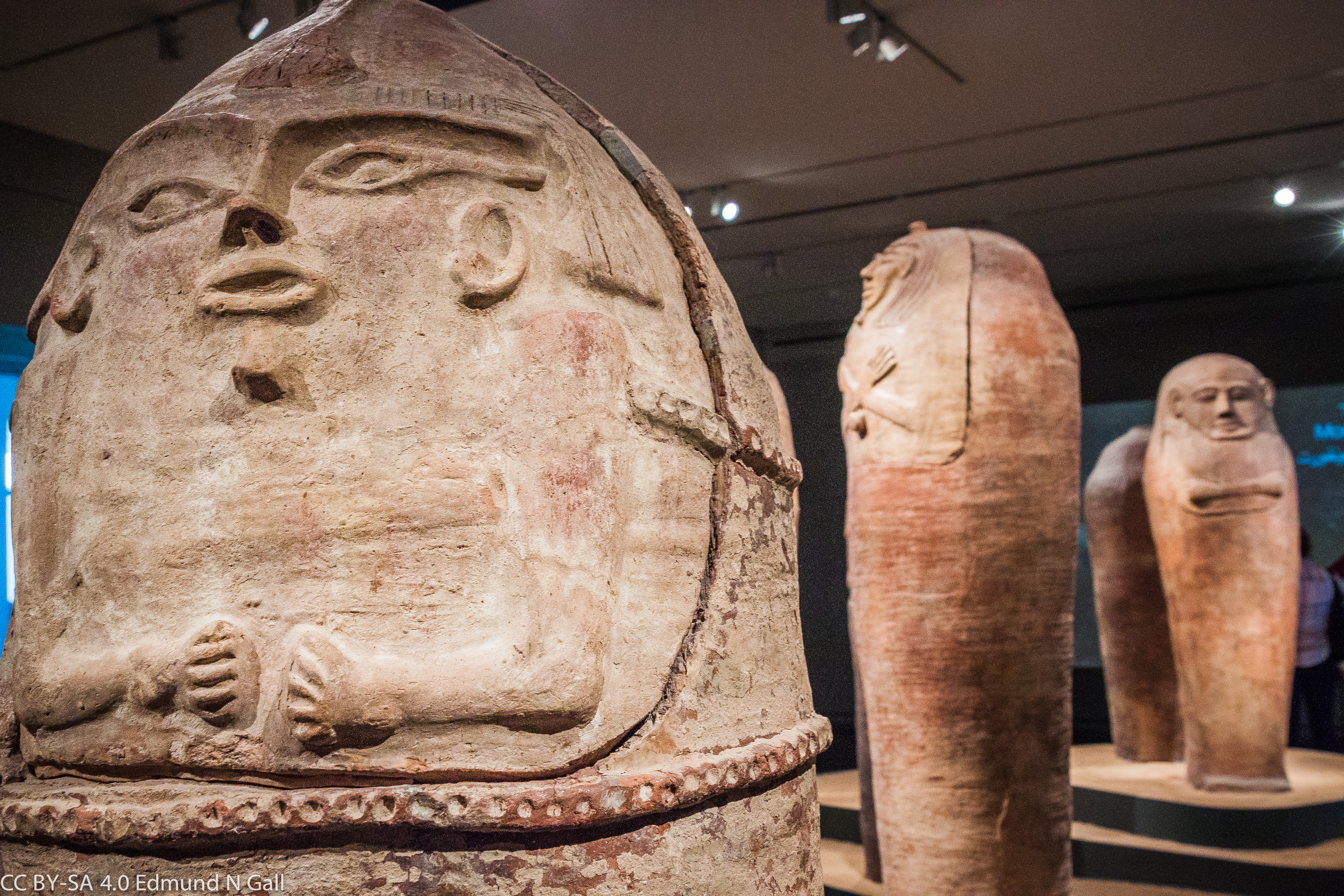
Some of the sarcophagi from Deir al-Balah are on display at the Israel Museum in Jerusalem.

Excavations Dothan was involved in included Tel Hazor (in 1952 and between the years 1955-1960) with Yigal Yedin and at Ein Gedi with Benjamin Mazar in 1961-1962. Between the years 1971-1972 she excavated with Amnon Ben-Tor in Athienou, Cyprus. Between the years 1971-1982, Dothan excavated at Deir al-Balah, where a large Canaanite-Egyptian fort and a large number of human-like coffins (anthropoid) were discovered. From 1981 to 1996, alongside American archaeologist Seymour Gitin, she excavated Tel Miqne (Ekron), which was revealed as a large industrialized and planned city from the Philistine culture.

In 1991, she won the Parshia Shimel Award for her contribution to the archaeology of the Land of Israel from the Israel Museum. In 1998, Dothan was awarded the Israel Prize in Archaeology. Since 1999, an annual series of lectures named after Truda Dothan has been held under the auspices of the Albright Institute for Archaeology and in collaboration between the Hebrew University and Al-Quds University. In 2003 she was awarded an honorary doctorate from Hebrew Union College. Her private collection of books is now in the Lanier Theological Library, Houston, Texas.

In 1951 she married Moshe Dothan (1919–1999), a fellow archaeologist with whom she shared interest in biblical archaeology and particularly the Philistine culture. They had two children together, one of them Dan was vocalist for the Israeli rock and new wave band HaClique. She died on 28 January 2016, aged 93.

== Awards and recognition ==
- 1991 – Percia Schimmel Award in archaeology, awarded by the Israel Museum.
- 1998 – Israel Prize, for archaeology.
- 2003 – an honorary PhD from the Hebrew Union College, Jerusalem.

== Published works ==
- The Philistines and Their Material Culture, 1982
- People of the Sea: Search for the Philistines (with Moshe Dothan), 1992
- Deir el-Balah: Uncovering an Egyptian Outpost in Canaan from the Time of the Exodus

== See also ==
- List of Israel Prize recipients
- Women of Israel
