= Sasha Okun =

Israeli artist, author and educator (1949–2025)

- סשה אוקון
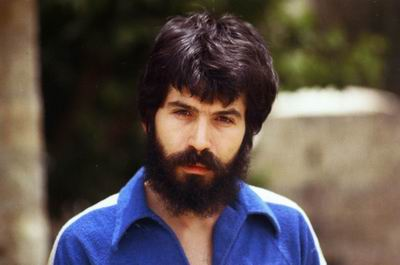
- Okun in 1982
- Born: Alexandr Nisonovich "Sasha" Okun'; 12 May 1949; Leningrad, Russian SFSR, USSR
- Died: 6 November 2025 (aged 76)
- Education: Stieglitz State Art and Industry Academy (MA)
- Known for: Painting, drawing, sculpture

Alexander "Sasha" Okun (Hebrew: אלכסנדר "סשה" אוקון; Russian: Саша Окунь, Александр Нисонович Окунь, Alexandr Nisonovich Okun'; 12 May 1949 – 6 November 2025) was an Israeli artist, author, and teacher. He is best known for his work in the medium of painting and has been compared to Hanoch Levin. Okun's art is characterised for its reference to classical baroque traditions, which he identified as tragic comedy in the tragicomic absurd perspective. He was a senior lecturer at Bezalel Academy of Arts in Jerusalem, where he taught for almost 40 years.

== Life and career ==
Okun was born in Saint Petersburg (then Leningrad), USSR on 12 May 1949. From 1961 to 1964, he began painting in the studio Solomon Levin at the Palace of Pioneers. Okun studied at Art School 190 from 1964 to 1966. Okun later studied at Stieglitz State Art and Industry Academy, where he graduated with Master of Arts in 1971. He taught drawing at the Art School Number 2 and in the House of Pioneers in Leningrad from 1972 to 1976.

During this time, Okun was also a member of the "Alef" section of the underground art movement. He exhibited at the first exhibition of non-conformist art in the "Gaza" Palace of Culture. Okun also exhibited at the "Nievsky" Palace of Culture in Leningrad, as well as in the Museums of Contemporary Art in Erevan (Armenia) and museums and galleries in the United States. He immigrated to Israel in 1979.

According to art critic and curator Smadar Sheffi, "The superb painterly qualities of the paintings link Okun to the European post-Renaissance tradition. Okun's paintings neither reflect nor imitate. They walk a fine line between caricature and the grotesque, but do not stoop to crudity. His works have been rightly compared to frescoes in terms of the sensation they create. We can think of Giulio Romano's Hall of the Giants in the Palazzo del Te, Mantua, from the 16th century, or some of the figures in the San Antonio della Florida in Madrid by Goya (1799), both wall paintings full of fantasy and severity."

Okun Is the illustrator of many books of I. Guberman, B. Kamyanov and S. Schwartzband.

From 1986 to 2023, Okun taught drawing at the Bezalel Academy of Art in Jerusalem as a senior lecturer. From 1988 to 2001, he taught drawing and painting at Emunah College in Jerusalem. By the late 1980s, Okun collaborated with Igor Guberman to broadcast "Eight and a Half" on Israel Radio. He also worked with Guberman to create the Israeli television programme "On Three", which was released in 2003.

Okun translated Elie Wiesel's Souls on Fire into Russian. The book was first published underground in 1979 and has been published three times under the name Scattered Sparks in Russia. His books The Book of Tasty and Healthy Life (2002), The Guide to the Country of the Elders of Zion (2009), which were co-authored by Guberman were published in Russia number of times. He also published in Russia Culinary Midrash (2000), Placebo (2007), Kamov and Kaminka (2015), and Romance with a pencil (2019). Romance with a pencil, and Kamov and Kaminka were translated into Hebrew and was published in Israel at 2022, 2023, and 2025. Okun also illustrated of books for Guberman, Boris Kamyanov and Sholom Schwartzbard.

Sasha Okun died on 6 November 2025, at the age of 76.

== Collections ==
Okun's works are represented in private collections in Australia, Austria, Canada, France, Israel, Italy, Mexico, Poland, the Netherlands, Russia, and the United States, as well as in museums in Russia, Israel, and Austria. The most notable venues include Stieglitz State Art and Industry Academy, the Museum of the Non-conformist Art and the Russian Museum in Saint Petersburg, State Hermitage in Saint Petersburg, Yad Vashem, the Israel Museum in Jerusalem, the Tel Aviv Museum of Art, the Albertina in Vienna, the Negev Museum in Be'er Sheva, the Janko Da-Da Museum in Ein Hod, the Ilana Goor Museum in Jaffa, the Bar David Museum in Bar'am, and the Tefen Open Museum in Galilee.

=== Selected exhibitions ===
- 2025 – "Gates of Justice", Dina Recanati Art Foundation Gallery, Herzliya
- 2025 – "Corpus", Tel Aviv Museum of Art
- 2025 – "A Pair Or", the exhibition with Judith Anis, Koresh 14 Gallery, Jerusalem
- 2025 – "Tina Kalisher, architect Yossi Shapira and others", Petah Tikva Museum of Art
- 2025 – "If I was Body", Petah Tikva Museum of Art
- 2024 – "Gates of Justice", Albertina Klosterneuburg, Vienna
- 2024 – Jewich Museum, Vienna
- 2022 – exhibition of multiple works from Albertina permanent collection, Albertina, Vienna
- 2019 – "Where Art Thou", State Russia Museum, St. Petersburg
- 2018 – "Summer Exhibition", Royal Academy of Arts, London
- 2017 – Albertina, Vienna
- 2016 – "Harmony and Dissonance", Gallery U & I, London
- 2014 – Winners of the Ish Shalom prize exhibited at Gallery "Agripas 12" Jerusalem
- 2014 – Museum of Fine Arts, Vitebsk, Belarus
- 2013 – "Master and Disciple", together with Asya Lukin at Gallery "Nora"
- 2013 – Contemporary Israeli Art Museum, Ramat Gan
- 2011 – Gallery Bait Adom, Tel Aviv – Yafo
- 2010 – Paddington Central, London
- 2006 – Artists House, Jerusalem
- 2005 – Basis Gallery, Adassa Neurim
- 2000 – Contemporary Israeli Art Museum, Ramat Gan
- 1999 – The Open Museum, Tefen, Galilee
- 1998 – Gallery Nora, Jerusalem
- 1994 – Janko Da-Da Museum, Ein Hod
- 1994 – Museum of Fine Arts, Ein Harod
- 1992 – Israel Museum, Jerusalem
- 1988 – Jerusalem Theater
- 1987, 1989 – Horace Richter Gallery, Tel Aviv – Yafo
- 1987 – Cite des Arts, Paris
- 1985 – The Jewish Museum, New York
- 1981–1983, 1985, 1986, 1988 – Debel Gallery, Jerusalem

== Critique ==
- "It is not for nothing that curator Hagai Segev defines Okun as "the most important artist in Israel who is almost unknown; the only Renaissance artist living among us in Israel"", Haaretz, Naama Geinbaum, 2024
