= Billi Gordon =

American actor and neuroscientist (1954–2018)

- Born: Wilbert Anthony Gordon Jr. September 2, 1954; Dowagiac, Michigan, US
- Died: February 22, 2018 (aged 63); Los Angeles, California, US
- Occupations: Actor; model; neuroscientist
- Spouse: Robert Lindsay Schallert (m. 1988; died 2018)

Wilbert Anthony Gordon Jr. (September 2, 1954 – February 22, 2018), better known as Billi Gordon, was an American author, television writer, neuroscientist, actor and model.

== Life and career ==
Gordon was born in 1954 in Dowagiac, Michigan. He graduated from Dowagiac Union High School. After high school, in 1972, Gordon entered the Roman Catholic Crosier Seminary in Onamia, Minnesota, but left during his freshman year to attend the University of Michigan at Ann Arbor. In his junior year, he withdrew from the university and moved to Los Angeles.

In L.A. he worked as an escort for an exclusive agency until 1982 when he became an alternative model and appeared on more greeting cards than any other model in the world, At the height of his career, he was paid $12,000 an hour; after which he began writing and performing as a woman. Gordon is the author of three works of non-fiction: Billi Gordon's You've Had Worse Things in Your Mouth Cookbook, which the Saturday Review described as "the humor classic of 1985"; Eat This Book: The Last Diet Book, and Your Moon Is in Aquarius but Your Head Is in Uranus, published by West Graphics.

Gordon was a television and film actor who portrayed male and female characters, including a role in the film Coming to America. He portrayed Belle on Married With Children and Chu Lin on Women in Prison. As a writer, he wrote an episode of the sitcom 227. Gordon also wrote and starred in the television pilot Next of Kin for Westway/Odessa.

In the mid-1990s Gordon returned to the University of Michigan and finished his degree in 1997. He went on to receive a Ph.D. in neuroscience and did his post-doctoral training in functional neuroimaging and brain research at the David Geffen School of Medicine at UCLA. Gordon investigated the pathophysiology of stress as antecedent to obesity-related diseases at the UCLA Gail and Gerald Oppenheimer Family Center for the Neurobiology of Stress for the Ingestive Behaviors and Obesity Program.

In 2009, Gordon was profiled on the front page of the Los Angeles Times, in a piece which focused on his dramatic weight changes and how it related to his career and lifestyle. Over the years, his weight has fluctuated between 300 and close to 1,000 pounds. At the time of the story, he had been admitted to the hospital at a weight of 701 pounds. A follow-up story reported that he had lost 175 pounds over the intervening five months, which allowed him to be able to fit into an MRI machine at 526 pounds, allowing doctors to further diagnose a large mass growing on his upper thigh.

He married Robert Lindsay Schallert, on August 6, 1988. They resided in Los Angeles, California. Gordon died on February 22, 2018, at the age of 63.

== Filmography ==
| Year | Title | Role | Notes |
|---|---|---|---|
| 1984 | The Party Animal | The New Dean | |
| 1988 | Coming to America | Large Woman | |
| 1993 | Married... with Children | Belle | |
