= Alternative model =

Outside mainstream ideals of beauty

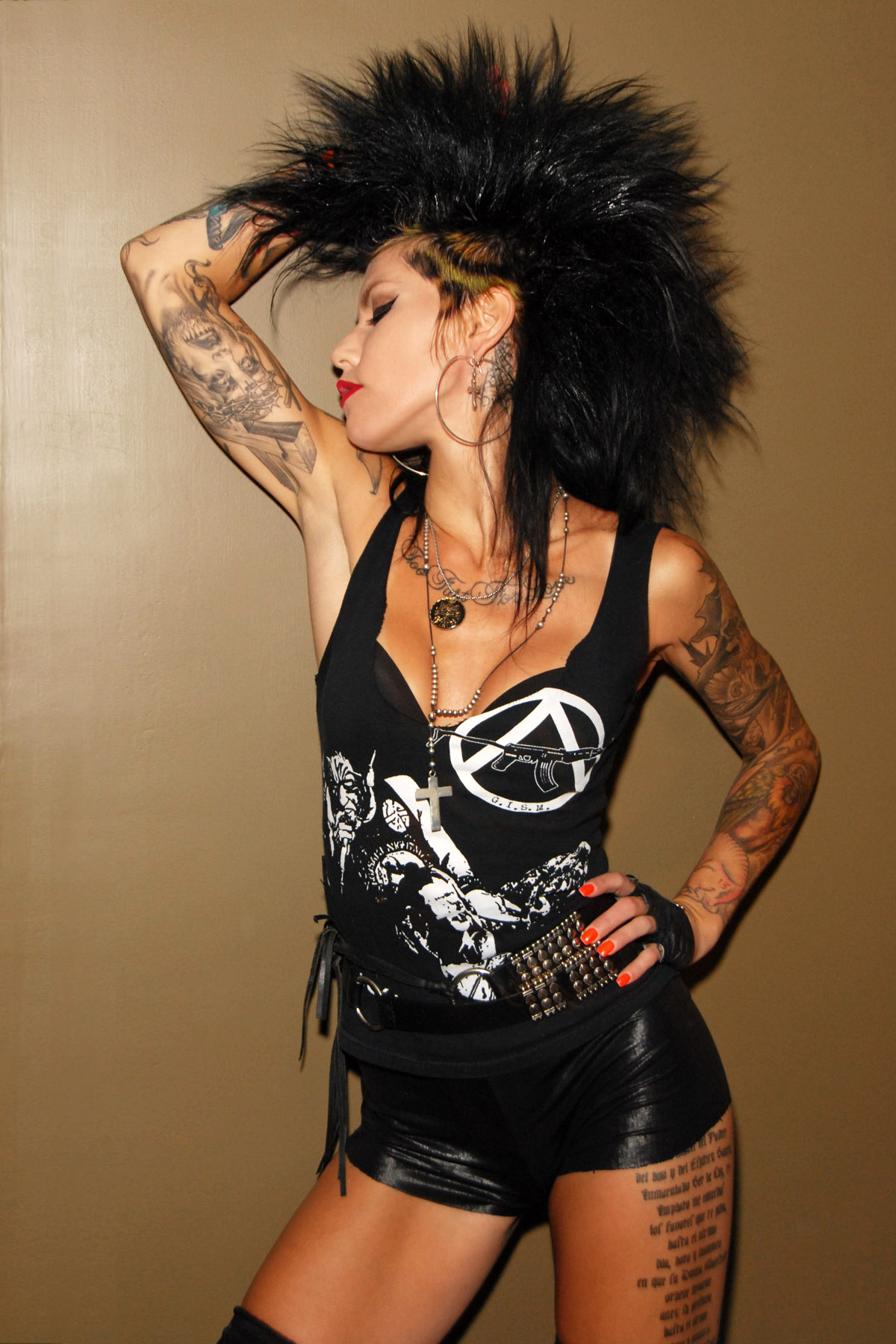
Malice McMunn, with her trademark mohawk

Alternative modeling is a branch of the modeling industry that features models who do not conform to mainstream ideals of beauty. Alternative models are often niche-specific, with a personal style that represents subcultures like goth, steampunk, and fetishism. An alternative model may, for example, be tattooed, pierced, or have other body modifications, have distinctively subcultural hair such as being shaved, dyed a distinctively unnatural color, or styled into a mohawk or dreadlocks. Alternative modeling can be clothed or unclothed.

Alternative modeling was given substantial mainstream media coverage in the 2000s and 2010s, partly through the creation and popularization of community-based alternative modeling paysites, like GodsGirls and SuicideGirls. Alternative modeling community sites usually promote their models for their personalities as well as for their looks and portfolios.

== Markets ==
Alternative models are often employed to promote niche products, either in shops or online, particular subcultural clothing shops and websites.

== Notable models ==
- Yasmin Benoit
- Anita De Bauch
- Billi Gordon
- Kato
- Mosh
- Ulorin Vex
- Dita Von Teese

== See also ==
- Alternative culture
- Alternative fashion
- Model (profession)
- Fetish model
