= Beverly Barkat =

Israeli artist

Beverly Barkat בברלי ברקת
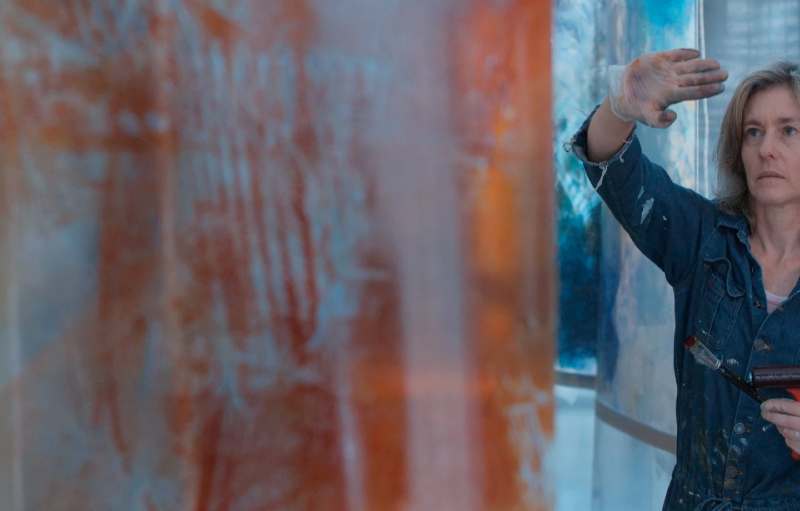
- Born: 1966 (age 59–60); South Africa
- Known for: Sculpture, painting

Beverly Barkat (Hebrew: בברלי ברקת; born 1966) is an Israeli visual artist.

== Biography ==
Beverly Sakalovsky (later Barkat) was born in 1966 in Johannesburg, South Africa to Louis and Lorna Sakalovsky, both artists themselves. In 1976, the family immigrated to Israel. She finished her studies at Bezalel Academy of Arts and Design in 1990, earning a BFA from the Department of Metalsmithing and Jewellery Design.

Barkat is married to former Jerusalem Mayor and current Minister of the Economy Nir Barkat, with whom she has three daughters.

== Art career ==
In 1995, Barkat worked in glass art in the Czech Republic and was invited to participate in an international glassblowing and sculpting symposium. From 2006 to 2009, Barkat studied painting in Israel Hershberg's Master Class at the Jerusalem Studio School. She took part in the JSS Summer Program in Italy twice, studying and participating in workshops alongside artists Lennart Anderson, Stuart Shils, and Raoul Middleman. Barkat experimented with new materials and architectural spaces. She dedicated herself to architectural projects such as the building and renovation of private homes, as well as communal spaces and libraries in elementary schools to improve the educational climate. In 2009 Barkat opened her own studio in Jerusalem. Her works have been presented internationally, in group and solo exhibitions.

Barkat’s early paintings were largely figurative and in keeping with the traditional Western genres.

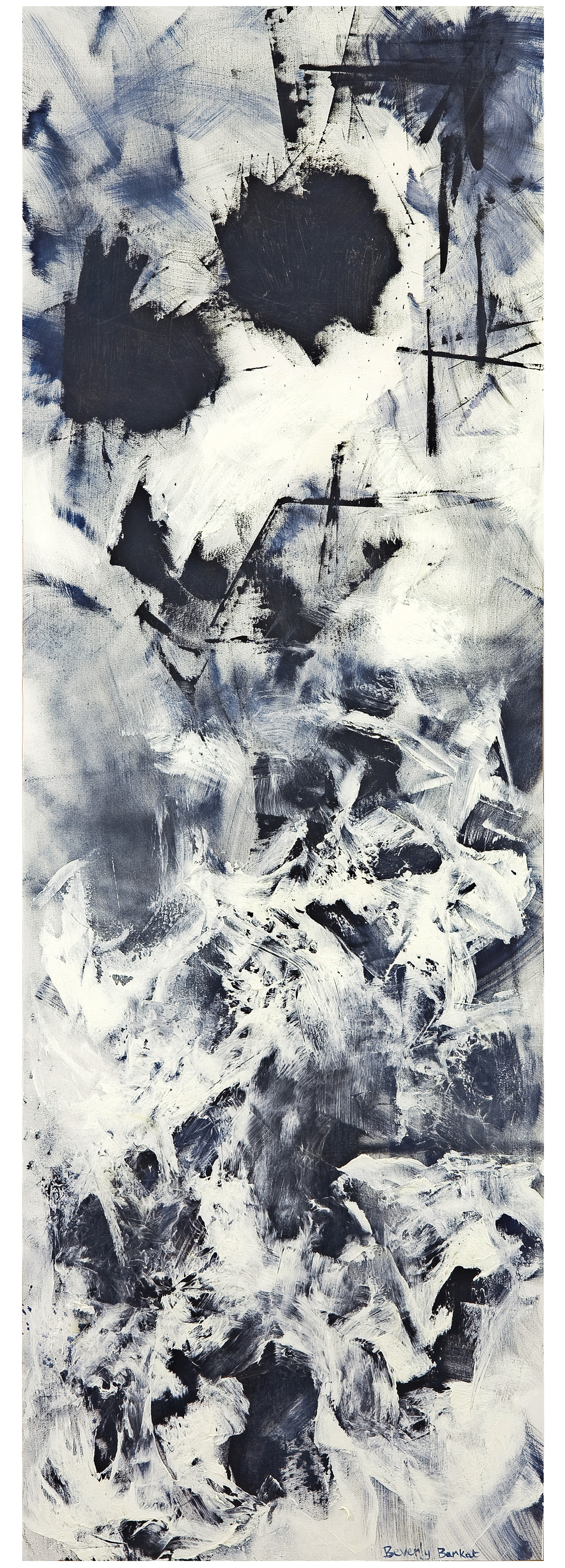
#173 from the Japanese series, Kyoto City International Foundation Curators' Award 2014.

Around 2009, her paintings took a turn towards formal abstraction, with influences of Cubism and Abstract Expressionism from her formative years becoming more apparent. Although she continued to draw from life, she started to deconstruct the figure and at the same time, capture movement on a two-dimensional surface with dynamic lines. In 2014, her set of paintings were inspired by Japanese calligraphy. She was awarded the Curator's Award at the 28th International Exhibition of Art & Design in Kyoto, Japan. Barkat started experimenting with new techniques, application methods and materials, the most prominent being the use of transparent PVC sheets as support for her paintings. These she paints in a manner reminiscent of action painting. Sally Haftel Naveh, the curator of her 2017 exhibition in Venice, comments on her use of this new material in the exhibition catalogue:

“The PVC sheets that Barkat picks for her paintings differ from other more conventional supports first and foremost in their transparency, so that while each side carries its own self-contained painterly motif, it echoes at the same time the one found overleaf. The work process progresses on both sides simultaneously, in constant symbiosis, free of any predetermined precepts or hierarchies.” The centrepiece of her 2017 site-specific exhibition entitled Evocative Surfaces, supported by Outset Contemporary Art Fund and exhibited at Palazzo Grimani in Venice, were 12 large PVCs hung from the ceiling. Their abstract and colourful surfaces interacted with the light and the architectural surroundings of the stately Venetian edifice.

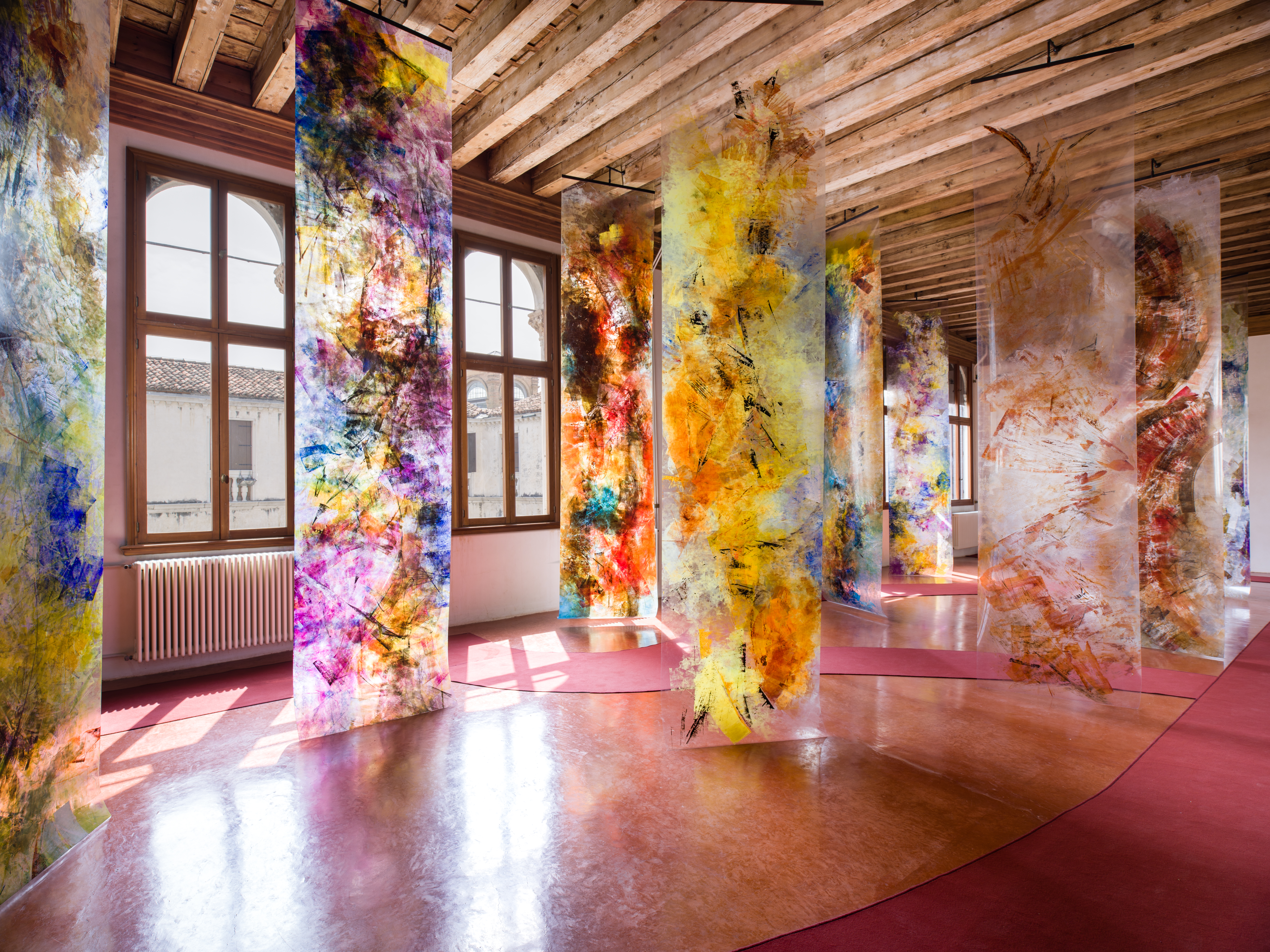
Evocative Surfaces exhibition, Museo di Palazzo Grimani, Venice 2017.

In 2018 Barkat held her second institutional exhibition in Italy, at Museo Boncompagni Ludovisi in Rome. The exhibition, titled After the Tribes, was curated by Dr. Giorgia Calo, who explains in the exhibition catalogue:

"After the Tribes is a large abstract, three-dimensional trompe-l’œil that dialogues with the mural paintings of the tree-lined allées and gardens of Villa Ludovisia, painted on the walls of the Salone delle Vedute, where the installation is located. After the Tribes projects the spectator into another dimension, in which space is annulled and viewers find themselves in an imaginary place that evokes a story reaching back across the millennia."After the Tribes was sponsored by Polo Museale del Lazio, Embassy of Israel in Italy and Nomas Foundation.

In 2022, she completed Earth Poetica, a sphere of 13 feet in diameter, made of metal-framed panels filled with plastic waste. The work is currently installed at the Gottesman Family Aquarium in Jerusalem, and will later be exhibited in the lobby of a building in the new World Trade Center overlooking Ground Zero in lower Manhattan.

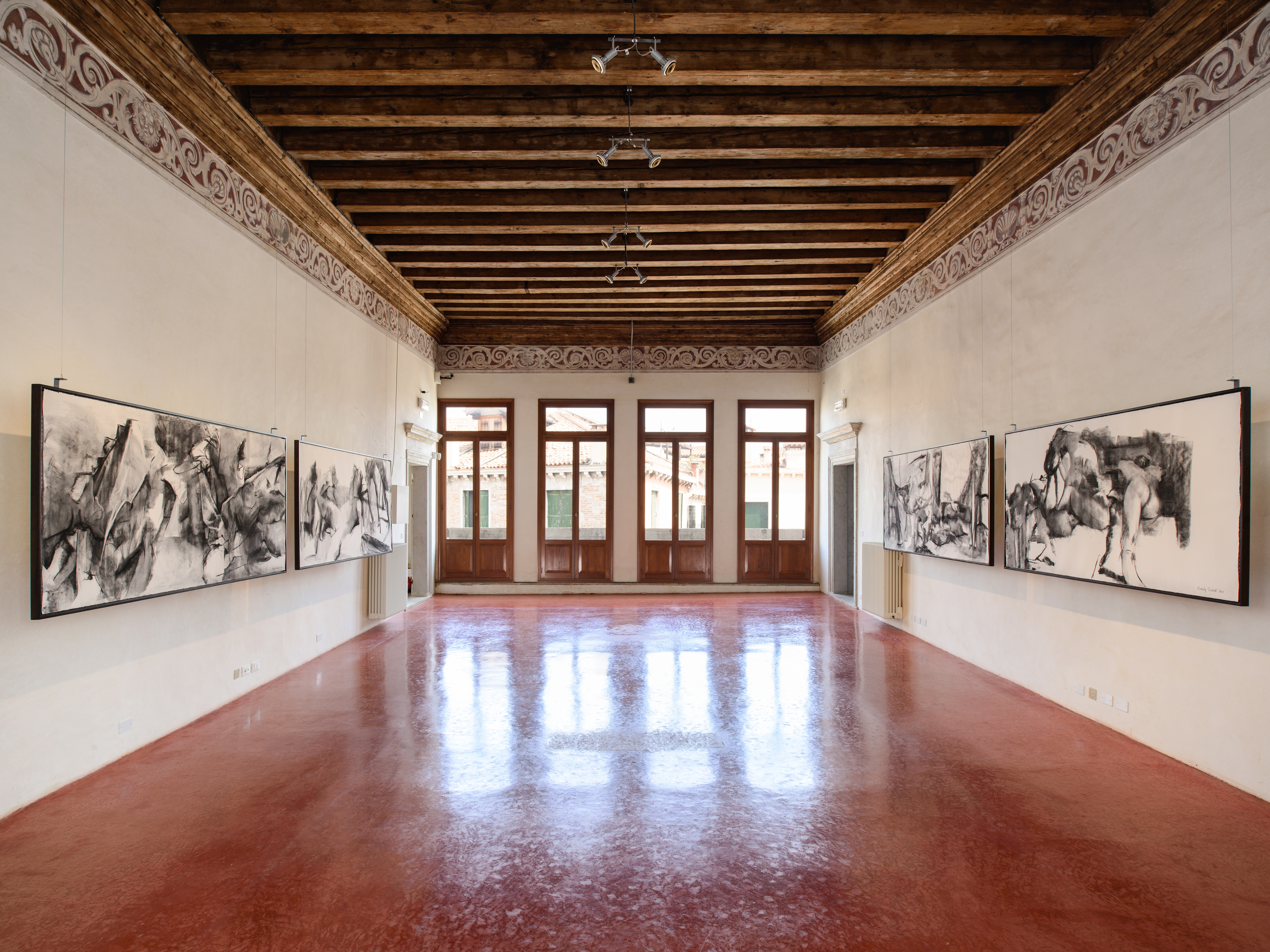
Model Series, Evocative Surfaces exhibition, Museo di Palazzo Grimani, Venice 2017

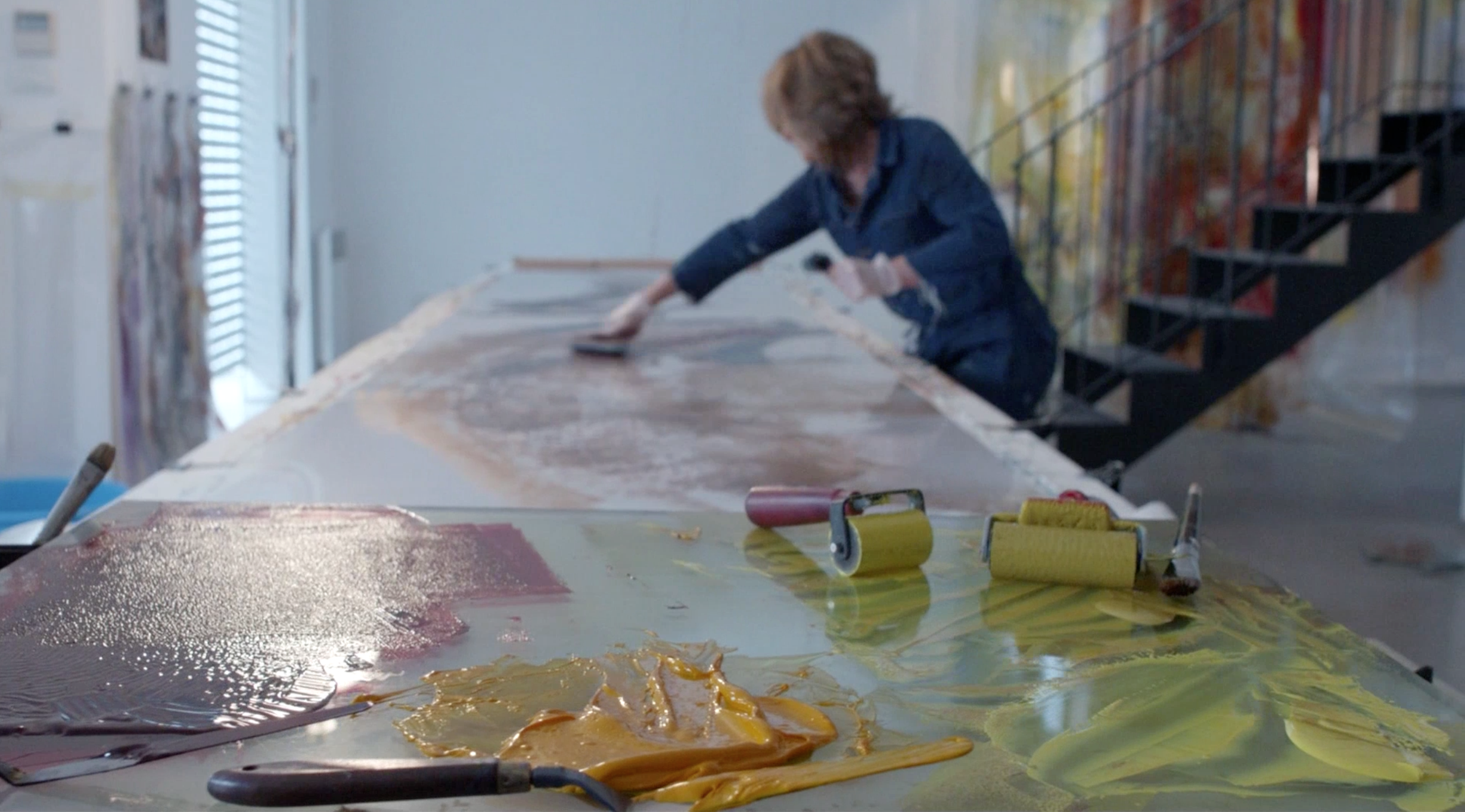
Beverly Barkat working in her studio, in Jerusalem.

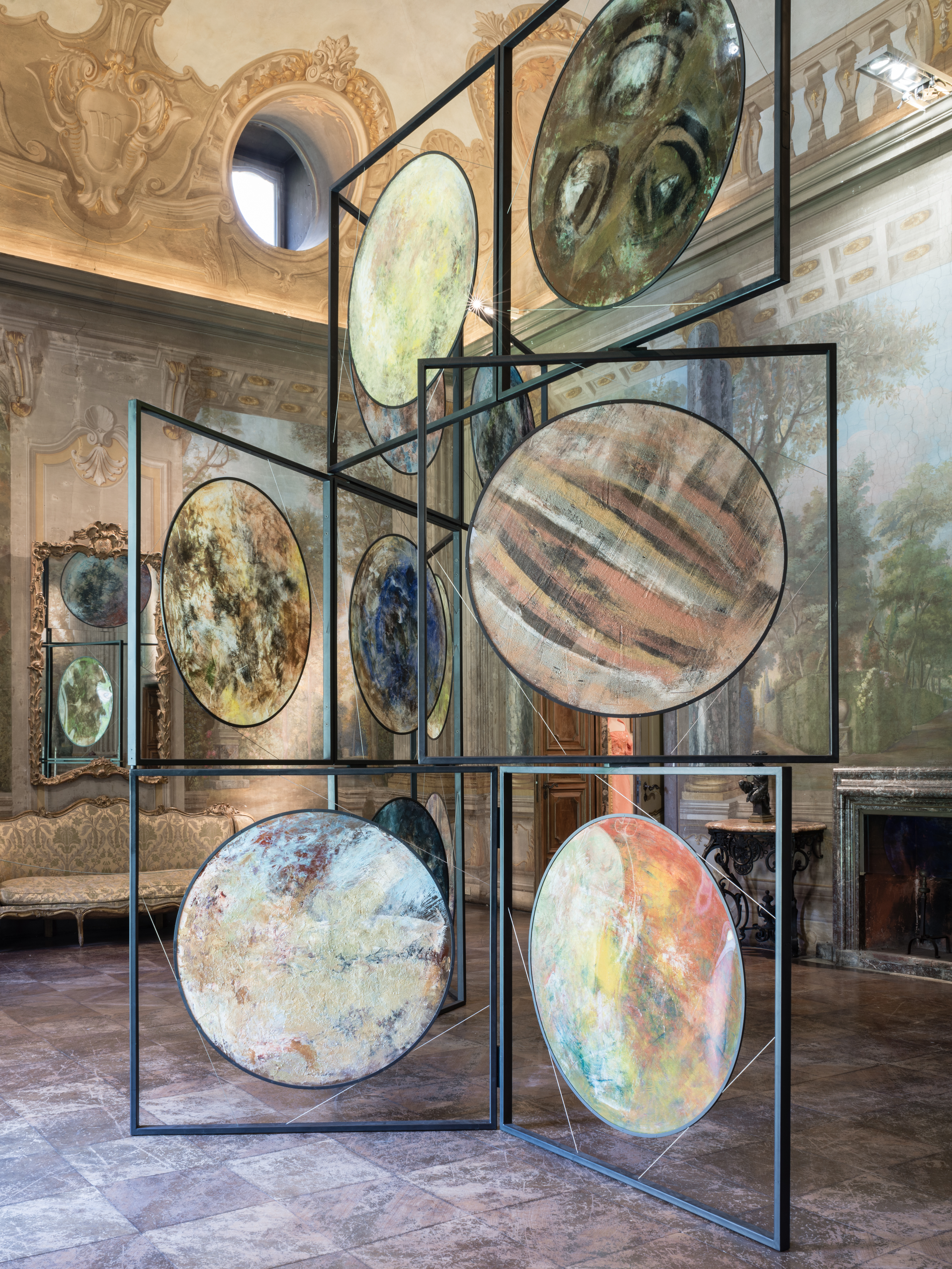
After The Tribes exhibition, Museo Boncompagni Ludovisi, Rome 2018

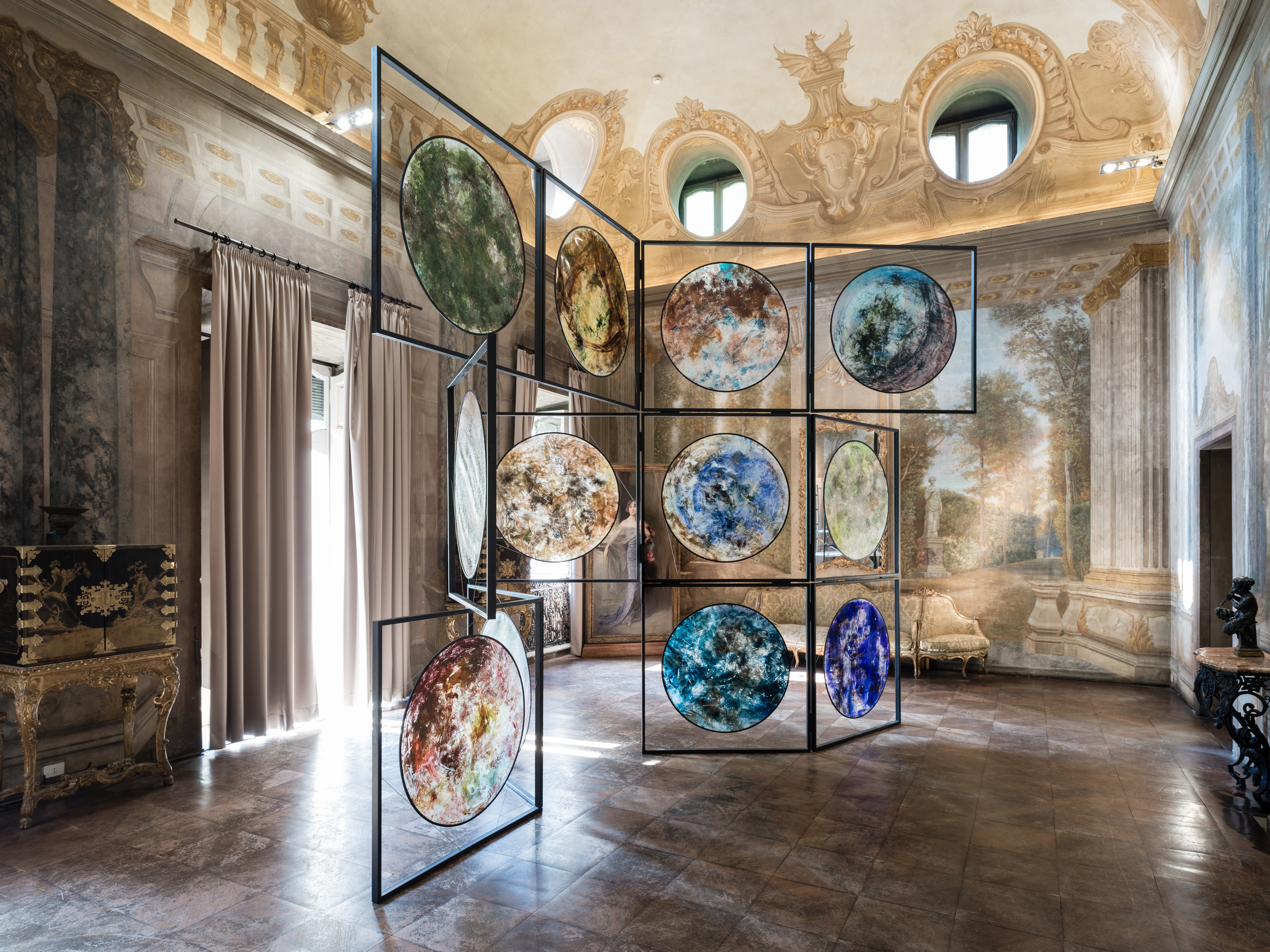
After The Tribes exhibition, Museo Boncompagni Ludovisi, Rome 2018

== Selected exhibitions ==
- N&N Aman Gallery, Tel Aviv, Israel 2013 N&N exhibition, curated by Naomi Aviv.
- Artists' House Tel Aviv, Israel, 2013 Screening Layers, curated by Smadar Sheffi.
- International Community House, Kyoto, Japan, 2014 The International Art & Design Exhibition.
- Kyoto Art Museum, Kyoto, Japan, 2014 The 28th International Exhibition of Art & Design (Kyoto City International Foundation Curators' Award).
- Luciano Benetton Collection, Tel Aviv, Israel, 2015 Imago Mundi Israel / One – Contemporary Artists from Israel, curated by Naomi Aviv.
- Museo di Palazzo Grimani, Venice, Italy, 2017 Evocative Surfaces, curated by Sally Haftel Naveh.
- Museo Boncompagni Ludovisi, Rome, Italy, 2018 After the Tribes, curated by Dr. Giorgia Calo.
- The Gottesman Family Aquarium Jerusalem, Israel, 2022, Earth Poetica, curated by Dr. Raffaella Frascarelli, Nomas Foundation

== See also ==
- Visual arts in Israel
- Women of Israel
