= Skin Two =

British fetish magazine

- First issue: 1983; 43 years ago
- Country: United Kingdom
- Language: English
- Website: https://www.skintwo.com
- ISSN: 0962-9297
- OCLC: 1115088905

Skin Two is a fetish magazine covering aspects of the worldwide fetish subculture. The name is a reference to fetish clothing as a "second skin".

== History and profile ==
Skin Two was founded as a fetish nightclub in 1983. In 1984, Skin Two magazine was produced by the publisher Tim Woodward and the photographer Grace Lau.

Published in London, England and circulated throughout the globe, Skin Two magazine provided information about fetish fashion, events, parties, people and news. A major concentration of the magazine is latex and other fetish clothing and the people and events related to the wearing of this clothing and alternative fashion in general. There is also a lot of information and features on fetishism and BDSM in general. The German version of the magazine, Skin Two Germany, was started by Peter Czernich in 1987. It was closed in 1989.

The magazine has also provided a stepping stone to further success for several internationally known writers, fetish models and photographers. Notable names featured in Skin Two include Tim Burton, Jean-Paul Gaultier, Dita Von Teese and Katy Perry.

Tim Woodward's company KFS Media, later launched a sister periodical called KFS Magazine, covering the wider range of alternative sexuality as a whole.

== Skin Two Clothing ==
Skin Two is also a clothing and accessories label, which is currently manufactured and sold by UK-based fetishwear company Honour Ltd under licence of KFS Media. As of 2022, Honour has re-branded itself as Skin Two.

== Skin Two Rubber Ball ==
Tim Woodward hosted this ball for fetish-related wear and people into fetishism and BDSM in general. It raised money for charities and was the central event in a weekend of fetish parties, held in London annually. Tim still runs a fetish nightlife business called The Chardmore Society.
