= Grete Wolf Krakauer =

Austrian-Israeli painter (1890–1970)

Grete Wolf Krakauer גרטה וולף קרקאואר
- Born: Grete Wolf; 1890; Moravia, Austria-Hungary
- Died: 1970 (aged 79–80); Jerusalem, Israel
- Known for: Painting
- Spouse: Leopold Krakauer

Grete Wolf Krakauer née Wolf (Hebrew: גרטה וולף קרקאואר; 1890–1970) was an Austrian-Israeli painter.

== Biography ==
Wolf Krakauer was born in Witkowitz, Moravia, on December 10, 1890, to a relatively assimilated, middle class Jewish family. One year later, her family moved to Vienna, where she received a modern education and was introduced to the latest ideas in art and philosophy, such as socialism and psychoanalysis. She studied art at the University of Applied Arts Vienna. She went on to travel and study with Johannes Itten, Albert Weisgerber and Adolf Hölzel. Her first solo exhibition was at the Kunstsalon Heller in Vienna in 1913, just before World War I began. She joined an avant-garde group of artists, the Bund der Geistig, and met her future husband, Leopold Krakauer. She became known for her portraits, painting leading figures in Red Vienna, and her work was included in the 1922 Venice Biennale.

In 1924, her husband moved to Jerusalem and she followed, along with their daughter Trude, a few months later. Instead of becoming active in the local art scene, she continued to develop her career in Europe exhibiting her work there and traveling there frequently until rising anti-Semitism made this impossible in 1932. Almost her entire family was murdered in the Holocaust and she only returned to Europe once after 1932.

In pre-state Israel (the Yishuv), Zionist organizations such as the Jewish National Fund and Keren Hayesod commissioned paintings from Wolf Krakauer of pioneering settlements. She also created documentary sketches of the Peel Commission proceedings and established the Marionette Theatre, a puppet theater. She traveled widely and her work was exhibited in Australia, South Africa, and Thailand as well as in Jerusalem. In 1969, Wolf Krakauer was the recipient of the Jerusalem Prize for Painting and Sculpture. She died in 1970 in Jerusalem.

== Legacy ==
Wolf Krakauer was included in the 2017 exhibition The Better Half: Jewish Women Artists Before 1938 at the Museum Dorotheergasse. Wolf Krakauer was the subject of a 2018 retrospective, Grete Wolf Krakauer: From Vienna to Jerusalem at the Mishkan Museum of Art. Her work was included in the 2019 exhibition City Of Women: Female artists in Vienna from 1900 to 1938 at the Österreichische Galerie Belvedere.

Her estate was preserved by her daughter, Prof. Trude Dothan, in her home in Jerusalem. She was restored to the canon of Israeli art after decades of oblivion in the wake of Smadar Sheffi’s doctoral research under the guidance of Prof. Gannit Ankori, submitted to the Hebrew University of Jerusalem in 2011. Part of the research was the basis for the exhibition Grete Wolf Krakauer: From Vienna to Jerusalem, at the Mishkan Museum of Art, Ein Harod, in 2018, curated by Dr. Smadar Sheffi.
