= Pesi Girsch =

Israeli photographer (born 1954)

Pesi Girsch פסי גירש
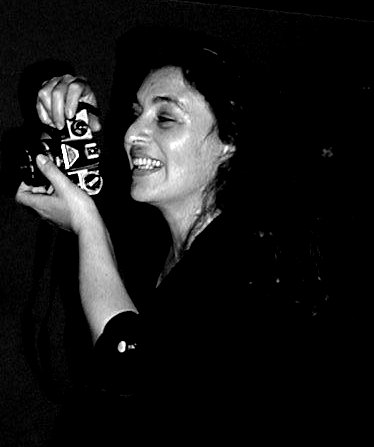
- Girsch in 2001
- Born: 1954 (age 71–72); Munich, West Germany
- Known for: Photography
- Movement: Israeli art

Pesi Girsch (Hebrew: פסי גירש; born 1954) is a German-born Israeli photographer.

== Biography ==
Pesi Girsch was born in Munich, West Germany to Holocaust survivors. In 1968, she immigrated to Israel with her mother and four siblings. She studied sculpture with Rudi Lehmann. After serving in the army, she studied drawing with Yosef Schwartzman and traveled to Germany to continue her studies. In 1977, she moved to Zaire, Africa with her husband. Two years later, she resettled in Tel Aviv-Yafo.

== Art career ==
In the 1980s, she abandoned sculpture, studying photography and education at the Midrasha Le'Omanut. Among her best-known work is the photography series "Glory to the Photographer's Model" (1991) in which she shows staged portraits of figures in the water with ritualistic overtones. In Natures Mortes from the early 2000s, Girsch shows still life using the corpses of dead animals. Stark, symmetrical compositions and lyrical lighting invest the photographs with symbolic meaning.

== Education ==
- 1969-74 Sculpture with Rudi Lehmann
- 1972-74 drawing with Yosef Schwartzman, Tel Aviv
- 1974-77 Sculpture, Academy of Fine Arts, Munich, Germany
- 1982-87 Photography, Art Teachers College, Ramat Hasharon
- 1982-87 Meisterschule of Kathe Kollwitz, Tel Aviv

== Teaching ==
- From 1986 WIZO France School, Tel Aviv, Photography
- From 1992 Haifa University, Creative Art Group

== Awards and recognition ==
- 1988 The America-Israel Cultural Fund Scholarship
- 1988 Gerard Levy Prize for a Young Photographer, Israel Museum, Jerusalem
- 1989 Prize for a Young Artist, Ministry of Education
- 1995 Grant from German Academy, Berlin, for Exchange of Artists
- 1999 Hadassah and Raphael Klatchkin Grant for Art, America-Israel Cultural Foundation
- 2001 Eli Oshorov Prize for an Outstanding Artist; Painter and Sculptors Association, Tel Aviv
- 2001 Prize, Ministry of Education and Culture
