= Scarlet (magazine) =

Defunct women monthly magazine

- Categories: Lifestyle
- Frequency: Monthly
- Founded: 2004
- First issue: November 2004
- Final issue: June 2010
- Country: United Kingdom
- Language: English
- Website: www.scarletonline.co.uk

Scarlet was a monthly women's magazine with a focus on sex topics run by Helix Media until it was relaunched in November 2004 with the tag line, "the new magazine for women who get it". It was published by Blaze Publishing Ltd, then sold to Interactive Publishing. It was distributed UK-wide at retailers such as W H Smith, Tesco, Superdrug and Somerfield.

Scarlet went into liquidation and ceased publication in June 2010. It was subsequently bought by a new publishing company and in February 2025, it became a digital entity at www.scarletonline.co.uk utilising relevant archive content and new content.

== Intentions ==
Scarlet claims to empower women to lead healthier lives through "frank informative features that talk to the readers the way women talk to each other when men aren't around." Its fiction section 'attempts to promote safe sex through eroticising condom use. launched a campaign against Fatism in the media. Scarlet has received positive reviews in UK daily newspapers The Times and The Guardian. When the magazine was closed down, there were several tributes in the press.
