= Mosher, South Dakota =

Unincorporated community in South Dakota, U.S.

Coordinates: 43°28′06″N 100°17′53″W

Mosher is an unincorporated community in Mellette County, in the U.S. state of South Dakota.

== History ==
Mosher had its start in 1930 when the railroad was extended to that point. The community has the name of Harmon B. Mosher, a railroad official. A post office was established at Mosher in 1930, and remained in operation until 1974.
