= Michal Heiman =

Israeli photographer

Michal Heiman (Hebrew: מיכל היימן; born in Tel Aviv) is a Tel Aviv-Yafo based artist, curator, theoretician and activist. She is the founder of the Photographer Unknown Archive (1984) and creator of the Michal Heiman Tests No. 1-4 (M.H.T). Her work bears on issues of history, human and women's rights, trauma, and memory, as well as an examination of the photographic medium, using reenactment, installation, archival materials, photographs, film, and lecture-performances.

Heiman teaches at the Bezalel Academy of Art and Design in Jerusalem and is a member of the Tel Aviv Institute for Contemporary Psychoanalysis.

== Artistic career ==
Michal Heiman, Nouraldin Musa (b. Bendisea, W, Darfur, Sudan, 1976), asylum seeker, photographer and actor in Legislative Theatre Group Holot, lives in Canada. Asylum (The Dress) 1855-2017, 2015, digitally printed photograph, 80X60 cm

For over three decades, since graduating from Art Studies at Hamidrash School of Art in 1984, Heiman has been developing a discipline that inhabits a field between photography, psychoanalysis, human rights, theory, and praxis. Heiman's work has been exhibited in leading venues around the world.

In 1997, Heiman represented Israel at Documenta X in Kassel, Germany, debuting her first Michal Heiman Test box and procedure. In 2008, her solo exhibition Attacks on Linking debuted at the Helena Rubinstein Pavilion for Contemporary Art, Tel Aviv Museum of Art. In 2017, Heiman exhibited her solo exhibition, AP – Artist Proof, Asylum (The Dress, 1855-2017), at the Herzliya Museum of Contemporary Art – a large-scale installation and performance work that incorporated the participation and input of visitors, and which raised questions concerning the notion of the right to return. Among her notable works are a lecture/film on British psychoanalyst Wilfred Bion and video works based on case studies by psychoanalysts Sigmund Freud and D. W. Winnicott.

Heiman has also exhibited in venues such as the University of Melbourne Museum of Art; Le Quartier Centre d'Art Contemporain, Quimper, France; the Jewish Museum, New York City; the Museum of Modern Art, Saitama, Japan; the Van Abbemuseum, Eindhoven, the Netherlands, and the Changjiang Museum of Contemporary Art, China, and others.

Heiman brings her critical voice to bear on issues of history, while engaging with human rights and more specifically, women's rights, exploring and questioning the ability of visual tools to penetrate traumatic experiences through different tactics and pre-enactments, as well as examine the photographic medium, its therapeutic potential, and its role in the struggle for social justice. Her enactment and installation works, archival materials, photography and film series, and her lectures/performances are deeply rooted in the political, familial, and social arenas.

From 2019 to 2020, Heiman exhibited work in the United States, focusing on her growing archive of narratives and histories of marginalized, pioneering, and revolutionary women, first with Radical Link: A New Community of Women, 1855–2020 in Washington, D.C., and then with Hearing in Los Angeles, California.

== Activism ==
Heiman has been active as a women's right advocate for many years. In 2015, she founded the organization Women in Academia to protect and advance women's equality in Bezalel Academy of Art and Design, and in 2018, she founded the public-benefit corporation An Academy of Her Own, which advocates for gender equality in various academic institutions.

== Personal life ==
Heiman has two children, Leigh (26) and Emily (22).
