= Mosh (model) =

American model

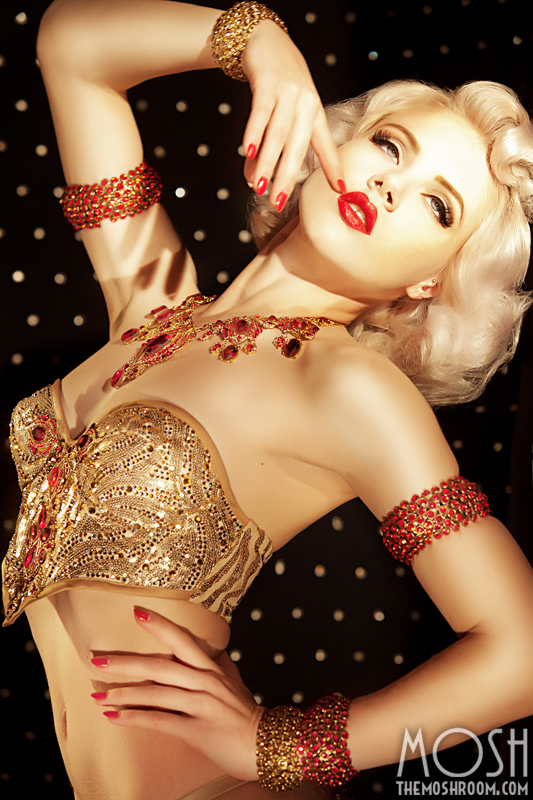
- Born: August 21, 1989 (age 36); Russia
- Occupations: Model, alternative model, fetish model, burlesque dancer
- Modeling information
- Height: 5 ft 3 in (1.60 m)
- Hair color: Blonde
- Eye color: Blue

Mosh (born August 21, 1989, in Russia) is a Russian-American alternative model and burlesque performer. Called "one of the world's leading alternative and fetish models" by ModelMayhem.com, she has been on the cover of Bizarre magazine a near-record seven times, as well as LA Weekly, OC Weekly, Girls and Corpses, DDI Mag, and numerous others. She has been featured on Playboy.com and Maxim en Espanol, and also stars in the music video for Pink's "Blow Me (One Last Kiss)." along with Nick 13's music videos for "Nighttime Sky" and "In the Orchard" from his eponymous album. More recently, she appears in the Smashing Pumpkins video "Silvery Sometimes (Ghosts)".

== Background ==
Mosh was born in what was then the Soviet Union, but moved to the United States with her family at the age of three. She trained in gymnastics for more than 10 years in school and was a cheerleader in high school, but injured her elbow in her first year as an acrobat. This limited her movement, and soon she began developing an interest in fetishwear, bondage, and pinup photography, She later undertook alternative and fetish modeling and performed burlesque.

== Career ==
Mosh began building her modeling portfolio at the age of 17, networking on Modelmayhem.com to set up photo shoots with local photographers while juggling high school, a job and an internship. She learned how to do her own styling and makeup, partially out of financial necessity, which led to the development of her self-styled signature look. After some years of modeling, Mosh began to combine her tease and fetish aesthetics with her gymnastic experience from her childhood, becoming a burlesque and fetish performer.

Her fetishes include latex, corsets, stockings, ropes, and more. She operated a subscription website, which offered members-only photos, videos, and information.
