= Leopold Krakauer =

Austrian-Israeli architect and painter (1890-1954)

- לאופולד קראקואר
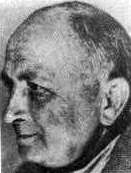
- Born: 30 March 1890; Vienna, Austria
- Died: 1954 (aged 63–64); Israel
- Occupations: Architect, painter
- Known for: Prominent architect in Israel during the 1920s; International Style architecture
- Spouse: Greta Wolfe
- Children: Trude Dothan
- Relatives: Danny Dotan (grandson), Uri Dotan (grandson)

Leopold Krakauer (Hebrew: לאופולד קראקואר; March 1890 – December 1954) was an architect and a painter. He was one of the most prominent architects who worked in Mandatory Palestine in the mid-1920s. He was also a painter who presented drawings and paintings at exhibitions in Israel and all over the world. Krakauer lived in Israel from 1924 until his death.

== Biography ==
Leopold Krakauer was born in Vienna, the capital of Austria on March 30, 1890. His father, Joseph-Moses, was a merchant in iron products. He studied at the Imperial and Royal High School in Vienna and between 1907 and 1912 he studied engineering and architecture at the Higher Technical School and then at the Imperial Academy of Fine Arts in Vienna. Until the First World War he worked in a Viennese planning office and as a draftsman for the architect Karl Seidel. During the war he served in a technical unit on the Italian front. In 1920-1921 he participated in the planning of the parliament building in Belgrade. In 1919, he exhibited some of his paintings at an exhibition in Vienna, as part of the avant-garde artist group "Bund der Geisitig Tätigen", where he met the painter Greta Wolff, who also exhibited at the same exhibition and as part of the group's activities, and they married. In 1924, the two immigrated to Israel, at the time Mandatory Palestine, together with their daughter Trude Dotan, and Krakouer began working in the planning office of Alexander Baerwald in Haifa. After that, he moved to Jerusalem and opened a private office (among others, the architects Shrega Friedrich Rohtin and Zev Weltsch worked in his office). He often designed private homes, both within Jerusalem and outside, and was one of the prominent planners in the workers settlement movement, where he designed communal dining rooms and other public buildings. He was also engaged in planning outline plans. He was one of the first architects to bring the modern trend in architecture to the Land of Israel, a trend that deliberately avoided decorative elements and strove for maximum functionality. He was particularly influenced by the architect Adolf Loos, who was also a visitor to his home in Vienna.

In 1948, he was appointed as a member of the Committee of the Flag Symbol, under the Provisional State Council. Krakauer helped choose the symbol of Israel.

Krakauer died on December 19, 1954, and was buried on the Mount of Comfort (Har HaMenuchot) in Jerusalem. A month after his death, an exhibition was held in his memory in Bezalel. In 1978, the Stamp Service issued a stamp with one of his thorn drawings. Another stamp, depicting the dining room at Kibbutz Tel Yosef, was issued by the Stamp Service in 1990. Krakauer is survived by his wife, the painter Greta Wolf, and his daughter, the archaeologist Prof. Trude Dotan. His grandchildren are the singer and writer Danny Dotan and the artist Uri Dotan. The Krakauer archive is currently kept in the Central Zionist Archive.

== His Work as an Artist ==
The influence of expressionism and post-impressionism and the influence of painters such as Oskar Kokoschka and Vincent van Gogh are evident in the work of Krakauer as a painter in Vienna. Art researcher Gideon Ofrat writes that the exhibition of Van Gogh's paintings that was shown in Vienna before the First World War is evident in the expressionistic charcoal drawings of flowers that Krakauer created in Vienna between 1921-1924 and is also evident in the quick and short lines of Krakauer in the later charcoal drawings of the Judean Mountains that he created between The thirties to the early fifties.

In 1919, Krakauer created "Creation", a cycle of charcoal drawings dealing with Jewish mysticism and the Kabbalistic myth of chaos.

Since his immigration to the Land of Israel, most of Krakauer's work in the field of art has focused on charcoal drawing. Most of his drawings are horizontal and were made on paper of an almost uniform size of half a sheet (approximately 50 x 70 cm) or slightly less. He always draw on cream or yellow grid paper (to depict sunny day scenes) or on bluish or greenish grid paper (to depict night scenes).

Most of Krakauer's work focuses on field drawing. Many of his works depict Jerusalem and its landscapes. His works are in the collections of major museums in Israel (including the Israel Museum and the Tel Aviv Museum of Art), and in museums in Amsterdam, Munich and Zurich, as well as others all over Europe.

His topics are divided into three:

- Figures of beggars/prophets/wretched people who blend into the landscape or emerge from it (including drawings of Jesus crucified and Jesus as a tree trunk).
- Still life: withered flowers recorded in charcoal with touches of watercolor (early 1920s), flowers and mainly thorns (1943-1954).
- Expressive views of the Jerusalem mountains and the city of Jerusalem recorded in charcoal (mid-1920s to mid-1950s)

=== Landscape works ===
Krakauer recorded expressive landscape paintings, mainly in the surrounding Jerusalem Mountains, villages in the Judaean Mountains, the tombs in the Kidron River and the walls of Jerusalem. According to the philosopher Martin Buber "Karkauer's loneliness met the loneliness of this landscape; and under the influence of this, his own loneliness became another" while the curator and the art critic Yona Fischer described him as someone who "emphasizes the volumetric structure of the landscape, on the one hand, and his dramatic nature, on the other hand".

=== Architectural Work ===
His most famous architectural works include:

- "Bunam House", "The Boksboim" and "Kisher House" in the Rehavia neighbourhood of Jerusalem
- Beit Ussishkin museum on Kibbutz Dan
- Dining rooms in Beit Alfa, Tel Yosef 1933
- Hotel Talpash in Haifa
