= Mosh Kashi =

Israeli painter and artist (1966)

- מוש קאשי
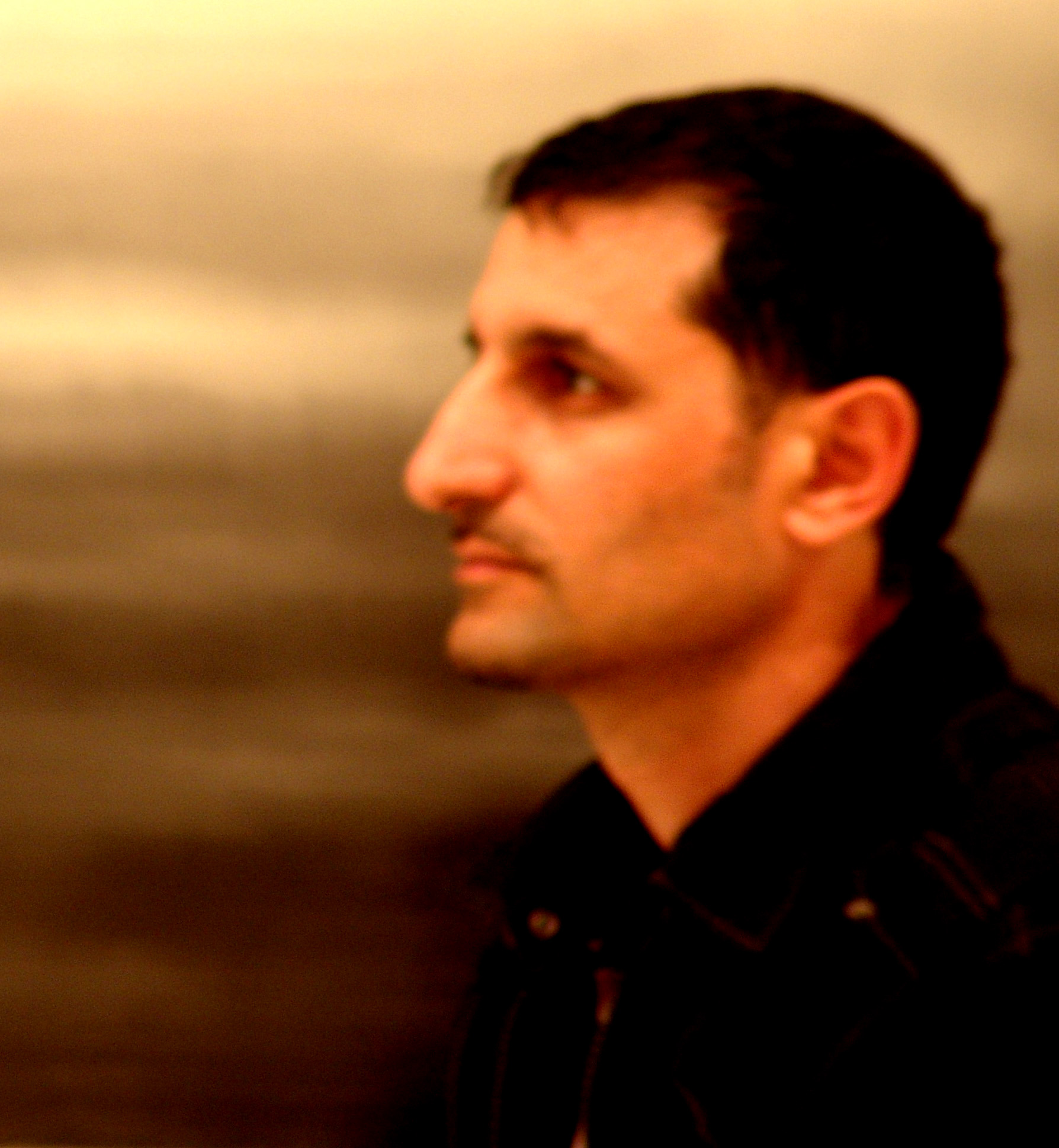
- Born: 1966 (age 59–60); Israel
- Education: Bretton Hall College of Education
- Known for: Painting, sculpture
- Website: moshkashi.com

Mosh Kashi (Hebrew: מוש קאשי; born in 1966 in Jerusalem) is an Israeli painter and artist. Senior Lecturer at the Bezalel Academy of Arts and Design in Jerusalem. In his works, Kashi raises issues that deals with painting in the contemporary era. Kashi's art has been exhibited in Israel and worldwide. He won the Young Artist Award (1994), Artistic Achievement Award (1997) and Ministry of Education (Israel) Culture and Sport Prize (2004).

== Early life and education ==
Kashi was born in 1966 in Jerusalem to an eight-person family. His father Efraim Kashi was a construction worker employed by Solel Boneh, and participated for years in building the Israel Museum. At age 13 Kashi was sent to boarding school in the Ben Shemen Youth Village. These years later produced the series of painting "Cronos", and there he painted wide fields, dark and black from one side to the other. The loneliness, the difference and the feeling of a luck of home in his period of studding in the boarding school, sharpen the idea of the "Non Places" that later appeared as a repeating motto in his works that mainly shows fields, night vegetation, thorns and trees floating from grasping in the ground, as well as his three-dimensional balls painted in entanglement till the last detail, and in 2000 also the porcelain gold balls scattered all over the gallery space. Between the years 1984–1987, Kashi studied in The School of Art – HaMidrasha, Between the years 1998–2000, Kashi completed his studies for his master's degree in art and education at Bretton Hall College of Education in Leeds, UK.

== Career ==
Kashi first exhibited in 1992, that year he won the America-Israel Cultural Foundation Prize for a young artist. In 1994 he won the young artist prize from the Science and Technology Minister of Israel. In 1996, he received a staying scholarship in Cite Des Arts in Paris, France. In 1997, he received the prize for art encouragement, and in that same year Kashi started to hold a position as a lecture at the Bezalel Academy of Arts and Design in Jerusalem.

In 2003 Kashi exhibited his works in Landscape Art Forum in Berlin. In 2004 he won the Minister of Education (Israel) Prize for Plastic Arts, and in that same year he received a scholarship on behalf of the Israel's state lottery for an artist book that was released for his solo exhibition "Cronos" that took place in 2006 in Noga Art Gallery in Tel Aviv. In 2010 Kashi exhibited an installation in his solo exhibition “There Golden Island” that took place in Bialik house Museum, Tel Aviv. In 2012, Kashi was invited to exhibit a solo exhibition of his works in the Tefen Museum. In honor of the exhibition, an artist book was released that was produced and support by the Tefen Museum and Noga Gallery, Tel Aviv.

The works of Kashi can be found in the collecation of public institutions, museums and private collectors in Israel and worldwide such as Israel Museum, Haifa Museum of Art, Tefen Museum and Herzeliya Museum. Kashi exhibited his works in many exhibitions in Israel and around the world, among them is the Israel Museum, Tel Aviv Art Museum, Haifa Museum of Art, the Tefen Open Museum (Israel), and the Magnes Museum in Berkeley, California. He also exhibited in selected art fairs abroad in Berlin, New York, Paris and Miami.

== Style ==
Gold Balls Installation

Kashi is a contemporary pantheist that his painting study field is based on views and imagery from nature. His paintings include fields, trees and entanglement, landscape and wide open space that try to express a place of which time stops, which is timeless and space less. Kashi's paintings are not created as a single painting but are created as a series of paintings. Every painting stands by itself and in every series there's a slow and research like attendance of the chosen subject. This kind of method of work allows Kashi to investigate, analyze and accuracy.

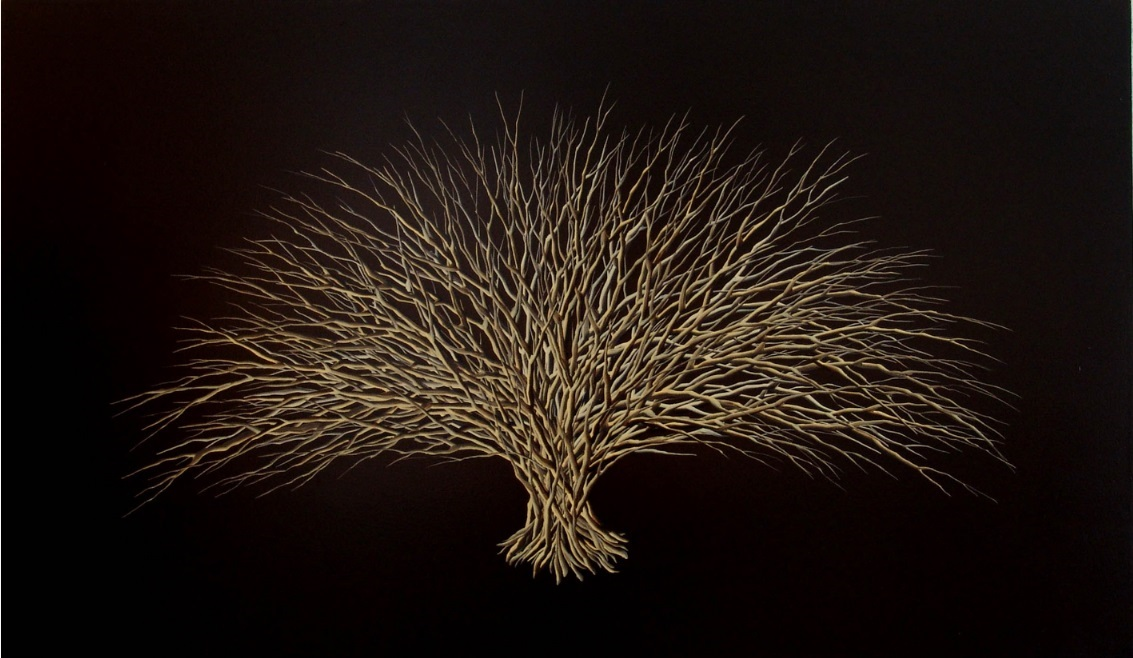
Bois Tree, 2009

== Awards ==
- 2004 Minister of Education and Culture Prize for the Visual Arts
- 2004 Israel National Lottery Council for the Arts' Scholarship for an artist book
- 1997 Creation Encouragement Prize, Ministry of Science and Education
- 1996 Blumenkopf Foundation Scholarship, France
- 1996 Cite des Arts Scholarship, Paris
- 1994 Young Artists' Award, Ministry of Science and Education
- 1992 America-Israel Cultural Foundation Prize

== Selected solo exhibitions ==
- 2023 Corpus, Noga Gallery of Contemporary Art, Tel Aviv
- 2014 Ash Dreamer, Noga Gallery of Contemporary Art
- 2012 Mosh Kashi, Tefen Museum, Tefen
- 2009 Ivory Dawn, Noga Gallery of Contemporary Art, Tel Aviv

== Selected group exhibitions ==
- 2026 Frequencies, Institute for Israeli Art, Tel Aviv
- 2026 The Back Page and Hezy Leskly, Minus 1 Gallery, "Haaretz" art collection, Tel Aviv
- 2026 Encounter, Tel-Hai Arts Institute, Tel-Hai
- 2026 In The Making, Noga Gallery of Contemporary Art, Tel Aviv
- 2025 Biennale for Drawing in Israel, Jerusalem Print Workshop
- 2024 MONOCHROME, Noga Gallery, Tel Aviv
- 2023 Truth Exposed, The Geological Museum, Ramat-Hasharon
- 2022 Sereality, The Gallery of Israeli Art at Tivon, Israel
- 2015 One, Cini Foundation, Venice, Italy
- 2012 Good Night, The Israel Museum, Jerusalem
- 2008 art.israel.world, Judah L. Magnes Museum, Berkeley
- 2007 News 2007: new acquisitions, Haifa Museum of Art, Haifa
- 2004 Shame, Installation (Rosenwasser), Digital Art Center, Holon
