= List of Israeli museums =

Below is an incomplete list of Israeli museums, some of which are located in East Jerusalem.

Name	Location	Primary display/topic	Annual visitors
ANU - Museum of the Jewish People	Tel Aviv	Jewish history	220,000
Israel Museum	Jerusalem (Givat Ram)	Archaeology, art, sculpture	~1,000,000 (2023)
Yad Vashem	Jerusalem (Mount Herzl)	Holocaust	~1,000,000
Rockefeller Museum	Jerusalem (East Jerusalem)	Archaeology	
Siebenberg House	Jerusalem (Old City)	Archaeology	
L. A. Mayer Institute for Islamic Art	Jerusalem (Katamon)	Islamic art, antique clocks & watches	
Gush Katif Museum	Jerusalem (Nachlaot)	History (Gush Katif)	
Heichal Shlomo Jewish Heritage Museum	Jerusalem (King George Street)	Judaica	
Menachem Begin Heritage Center	Jerusalem	Biographical – Menachem Begin	
Friends of Zion Museum	Jerusalem	Jewish history	
Beit Agnon	Jerusalem (Talpiot)	Biographical – Shmuel Yosef Agnon	
Museum of Underground Prisoners	Jerusalem (Morasha)	Jewish resistance in the British Mandate	
Bible Lands Museum Jerusalem	Jerusalem (Givat Ram)	Biblical history, archaeology	
Bloomfield Science Museum	Jerusalem (Givat Ram)	Hands-on science and technology	300,000
Ticho House	Jerusalem	Paintings by Anna Ticho, Judaica	
Tower of David	Jerusalem (Old City)	History of Jerusalem	500,000+ (2023)
Herzl museum	Jerusalem (Mount Herzl)	Biographical – Theodor Herzl, history of Zionism	
U. Nahon Museum of Italian Jewish Art	Jerusalem	Italian Jewish art, Italian synagogue	40,000
Jerusalem Tax Museum	Jerusalem (Jaffa Road)	Historical documents	
Tel Aviv Museum of Art	Tel Aviv	Modern art, contemporary Israeli art	1,070,714 (2022)
Frenkel Frenel Museum	Safed	Art of Franco-Israeli painter and sculptor, Isaac Frenkel Frenel	
Independence Hall	Tel Aviv	History of Israel (independence)	
Batei HaOsef	Formerly Tel Aviv, now being transferred to Latrun	Israel Defense Forces	
Bauhaus Museum	Tel Aviv	White City of Tel Aviv	
Bialik House	Tel Aviv	Hayyim Nahman Bialik	
Ben-Gurion House	Tel Aviv	David Ben-Gurion	
Hetzel Museum	Tel Aviv	Irgun pre-state Jewish underground	
Etzel House (Beit Gidi)	Tel Aviv	Irgun – Operation Hametz	
Steinhardt Museum of Natural History	Tel Aviv	Natural history	
Yitzhak Rabin Center	Tel Aviv	Yitzhak Rabin	100,000
HerzLilienblum Museum of Banking and Tel Aviv Nostalgia	Tel Aviv	Banking and old Tel Aviv culture	
Lehi Museum – Beit Yair	Tel Aviv (Florentin)	Lehi	
The Olympic Experience	Tel Aviv (Hadar Yosef)	Sports	
Nahum Gutman Museum of Art	Tel Aviv (Neve Tzedek)	Art by Nachum Gutman	
Farkash Gallery collection	Tel Aviv (Old Jaffa)	Posters	
Ilana Goor Museum	Tel Aviv (Old Jaffa)	Israeli art and culture	
Jaffa Museum	Tel Aviv (Old Jaffa)	Israeli art and culture, antiquities	
Eretz Israel Museum	Tel Aviv (Museum Campus)	Archaeology, history of Eretz Yisrael	
Beit HaPalmach	Tel Aviv (Ramat Aviv)	Jewish resistance during the British Mandate – Palmach	
Haifa Museum	Haifa	Contemporary Israeli art	
Tikotin Museum of Japanese Art	Haifa	Japanese art	
Israel Railway Museum	Haifa	Transportation – railways	
Israeli Clandestine Immigration and Naval Museum	Haifa	Israel Defense Forces – Sea Corps	
Israeli National Maritime Museum	Haifa	Maritime history	
Israel National Museum of Science, Technology, and Space	Haifa	Science and technology, hands-on exhibits	400,000
Moshe Shteklis Museum of Prehistory	Haifa	History – prehistory	
Hecht Museum	Haifa	Archaeology, Art	
Munio Gitai Weinraub Museum of Architecture	Haifa	Architecture	
Mane-Katz Museum	Haifa	Art	
Arad Bible Museum	Arad	Archaeology	
Arad Doll Museum	Arad	Comedia del arte figures, handcrafted dolls	
Arad Glass Museum	Arad	Glass sculpture	
Arad Museum of Art	Arad	Art	
Beit HaGdudim	Avihayil	Jewish Legion	
Ashdod Museum of Art	Ashdod	Art	
Karin Maman Museum	Ashdod	Archaeology	
Negev Museum of Art	Beersheba	Art	
Biblical Museum of Natural History	Beit Shemesh	Hands-on animals, Torah, history and science	
Ralli Museum	Caesarea	Art	
Ein Harod Museum of Art (Mishkan)	Ein Harod	Art	
Sturman Museum	Ein Harod	Natural history	
Janco Dada Museum	Ein Hod	Art (Israeli)	
Wilfrid Israel Museum	HaZore'a	Art (Asian)	
Israeli Air Force Museum	Hatzerim Airbase	Israel Defense Forces – Air Force	
Herzliya Museum of Contemporary Art	Herzliya	Art (contemporary Israeli)	
Holon Children's Museum	Holon	Children; visually impaired; hearing impaired	
Design Museum Holon	Holon	Design	
Egged Historical Vehicle Museum	Holon	Transportation – buses	
Yad La-Shiryon	Latrun	Israel Defense Forces – Armor Corps	
Mini Israel	Latrun	Miniature park, architecture	
Ghetto Fighters' House	Lohamei HaGeta'ot	Holocaust and Jewish Resistance	
Museum of Prehistory of the Hulah Valley	Ma'ayan Barukh	Archaeology	
Masada Museum	Masada	History of Masada	
International Jewish Sports Hall of Fame	Netanya	Sports	
Petah Tikva Museum of Art	Petah Tikva	Art	
Museum of Israeli Art	Ramat Gan	Art (Israeli)	
Museum of Russian Art	Ramat Gan	Art (Russian)	
Yehiel Nahari Museum of Far Eastern Art	Ramat Gan	Art (Far Eastern)	
Yemenite Jewish Heritage Center and Museum	Rehovot	Yemenite Jewish Heritage	
Rishon LeZion City Museum	Rishon LeZion	City	
The Arab Museum of Contemporary Art	Sakhnin	Art (Contemporary Arab, Israeli and Mediterranean Art)	
Museum for Archaeology and Knowledge of Israel	Sasa	Archaeology	
Qassam Museum	Sderot	Qassam rockets	
German-Speaking Jewry Heritage Museum Tefen	Tefen Industrial Zone	Jewish history	
Umm al-Fahm Art Gallery	Umm al-Fahm	Art (Arab)	40,000 (2010)
Beit HaTotchan	Zikhron Ya'akov	Israel Defense Forces – Artillery Corps	
Urigeller Museum	Old Jaffa, Tel Aviv-Yafo	Art, History	
