= Hugh Nissenson =

American writer (1933–2013)

- Born: Hugh Howard Nissenson; March 10, 1933; New York City, New York, U.S.
- Died: December 13, 2013 (aged 80); Manhattan, New York City, New York, U.S.
- Education: Fieldston School
- Alma mater: Swarthmore College
- Occupation: Writer
- Spouse: Marilyn Nissenson
- Children: 2
- Writing career
- Language: English
- Notable awards: Edward Lewis Wallant Award (1965)

Hugh Nissenson (March 10, 1933, in New York City – December 13, 2013, in Manhattan) was an American writer.

Nissenson drew heavily on his Jewish background in his writing, exploring themes of mysticism, Israel, and the Holocaust.

== Biography ==
Hugh Nissenson was born in New York on March 10, 1933, the only child of Charles and Harriette Nissenson. Nissenson's father immigrated to the United States from Warsaw in 1910, working in a sweatshop sweater factory and later as a salesman. His mother, born Harriette Dolch, was born in Brooklyn to immigrant parents from Lvov, Poland.

After attending the Fieldston School in The Bronx, New York, Nissenson attended Swarthmore College in Swarthmore, Pennsylvania, graduating with a bachelor's degree in 1955. He worked briefly as a copy boy at The New York Times, but was encouraged by his mother to pursue his love of fiction. Nissenson spent time in Israel in the 1950s and 1960s, reporting on the Adolf Eichmann trial for Commentary magazine, and spending time in kibbutz Ma'ayan Baruch, which formed the basis for his 1968 book Notes from the Frontier.

In 1976, Nissenson published his first novel, My Own Ground.

Nissenson died on December 13, 2013, at his home in Manhattan, New York. He was survived by his wife Marilyn and two daughters, Kate and Kore.

== Publications ==
- A Pile of Stones (1965)
- Notes from the Frontier (1968)
- In the Reign of Peace (1972)
- My Own Ground (1976) ISBN 978-0060970758
- The Tree of Life (1985) ISBN 978-0966491326
- The Elephant and My Jewish Problem (1988) ISBN 978-0060159856
- The Song of the Earth (2001) ISBN 978-1565122987
- The Days of Awe (2007) ISBN 978-1402207563
- The Pilgrim (2011) ISBN 978-1402209246

== Awards ==
=== Won ===
- 1965 Edward Lewis Wallant Award – A Pile of Stones
- 2002 Gaylactic Spectrum Awards – The Song of the Earth

=== Nominated ===
- 1985 National Book Award – The Tree of Life
- 2001 James Tiptree, Jr. Award – The Song of the Earth
- 2011 Langum Prizes – The Pilgrim
