= Siebenberg House =

Archaeological museum in Jerusalem

Coordinates: 31.7746°N 35.2332°E

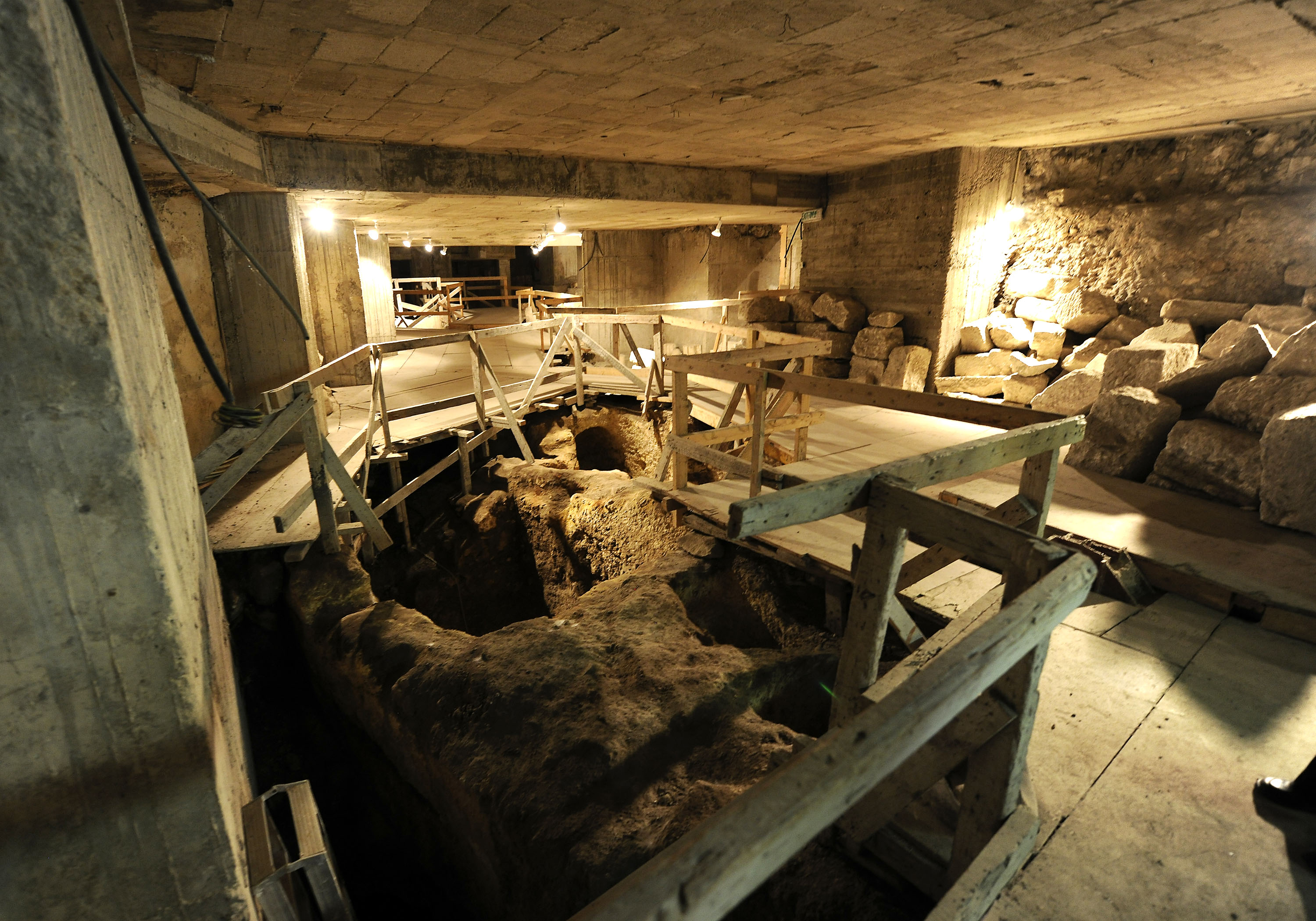
- Location: 5 Beit HaShoeva Alley; Jewish Quarter; Jerusalem
- Type: archaeology and history
- Website: siebenberghouse.com

Siebenberg House (Hebrew: מוזיאון בית זיבנברג) is an underground archaeology museum, located below a house, in the Jewish Quarter of the Old City of Jerusalem.

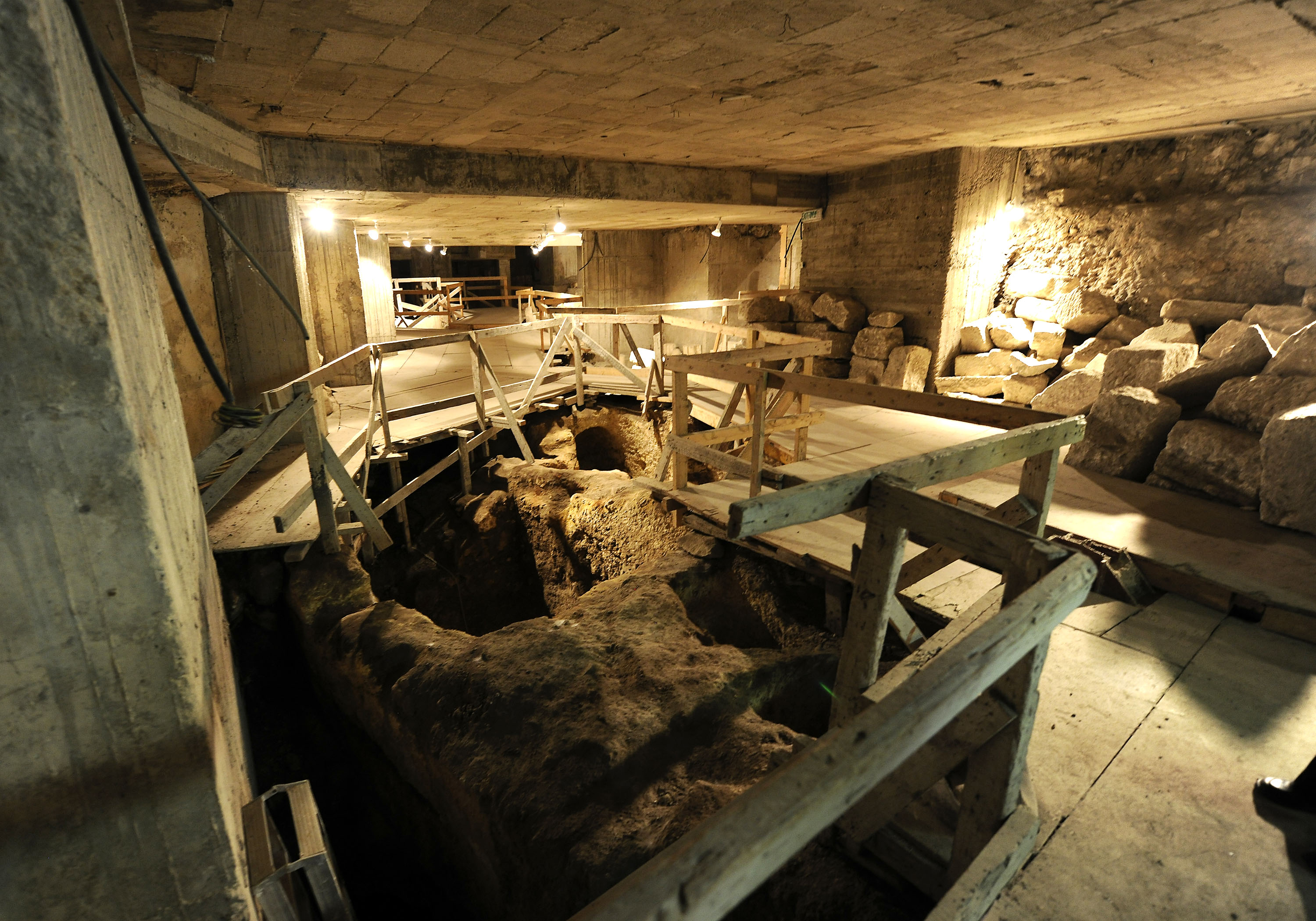
Siebenberg House

The founder of the museum, Theo Siebenberg, moved to the Old City of Jerusalem in 1970 and started excavating underneath his home in order to fulfil his lifelong dream of finding an inextricable link between the Jerusalem of today and the Jerusalem of nearly three thousand years ago.

The excavations carried out underneath the Siebenberg home in the course of 18 years have revealed remains of ancient dwellings, rooms cut from rock, mikvehs (ritual baths) an aqueduct, two huge cisterns and a burial vault, reaching back 3,000 years to the days of King David and the First Temple period, as well as from the Second Temple period. It also shows artifacts, including pottery, glass, mosaics, coins, jars and weapons.

== Theo Siebenberg (founder) ==
Theo Siebenberg was born in Antwerp, Belgium in 1925, into a Zionist home. Theo was educated in the Tachkemoni school. In 1936, at the home of Yechiel Meir and Milka Siebenberg (Theo's parents), the Jewish State Party, which was led by Meir Grossman and had separated from Jabotinsky's Revisionist Movement, was established. In this gathering many of the heads of congregations (rabbis) of major communities in Western Europe were in attendance, including Robert Stricker who was the head of the congregation of Vienna. After being in a Zionist environment for all of his life, Theo, was a budding Zionist himself already. At the age of 10, Theo loved looking at the stamps from the letters his parents received from Jerusalem, depicting Jerusalem's Old City skyline of the Dome of the Rock and the Tower of David. Looking at the stamps, Theo started dreaming about Jerusalem, a place he thought of as his ancestral home.

On May 10, 1940, when Theo was 14, Germany marched into Belgium. The following day Theo and his family fled Belgium, and were on the run for close to a year. They passed through Dunkirk, the Maginot Line, and the whole of France to Marseilles. From there they had to cross the Pyrenees mountains to get into Spain, and from there they went into Portugal where they got onto a boat to America. The boat ride was delayed and took six weeks to get to America because they had to pass through German conveys along the way. Theo and his family reached Ellis Island and gained entry into the United States.

When Theo was a teenager in America, in the early 1940s, he participated in demonstrations and helped raise funds for Israel. After the war ended Theo spent half his time in America and half his time in Antwerp. In Antwerp in 1946, Theo joined the Lehi movement, a Zionist group. On November 29, 1947, Theo went as a journalist to Lake Success, where the United Nations General Assembly was voting on the partition plan.

As a Jew in the diaspora, Theo was yearning and longing to fulfill his dream of coming to live in Jerusalem. In 1970, Theo built his home in the ancient Jewish Quarter in Jerusalem's Old City. Everywhere Theo walked he saw a bridge to the past and it was there that Theo started to fulfill his lifelong dream of finding a direct connection and link between the Jews of today and the Jews in the time of King David and King Solomon. Theo had a hunch that beneath his home he would find archeological evidence of the Jews who lived there nearly 3,000 years ago. In the course of 18 years of excavation, countless historic artifacts have been found. "The sense of the continuity of Jewish history comes right up from the basement," Mr. Siebenberg said. "Here, in one spot, you can see Jewish history vertically. It is not like taking children to a museum and showing them arrowheads with this date on them or jars with that date. It's all here. Here we were and here we are". The museum officially opened its doors in 1987, and eventually the museum and all of its artifacts will be donated to the public.

== History ==
The Siebenberg House tells of three periods of the reign of the Kingdom of Israel. During their millennia-spanning history, the Jewish people have had sovereignty and independence only three times: 3,000 years ago, during the reigns of King David and King Solomon; 2,000 years ago, during the period of the Hasmoneans; and in the present, in the form of the State of Israel.

The Siebenberg House is more than a convergence of the periods of Jewish independence and sovereignty, it contains a timeline of Jewish history and its underlying story all under one house in the center of Jewish life, Jerusalem. The significance of this archaeological find under the modern house is the story and message that history tells to us today. The continuity of the Jewish people. Where apparently the palace of a Hasmonean once stood now resides the Siebenberg family some 2,000 years later.

=== First Temple Period ===
According to the Bible Solomon's Temple, also known as the First Temple, was the Holy Temple (Hebrew: בֵּית־הַמִּקְדָּשׁ: Bet HaMikdash) in ancient Jerusalem, on the Temple Mount (also known as Mount Zion). Before its destruction by Nebuchadnezzar II after the Siege of Jerusalem of 587 BCE. The Hebrew Bible states that the temple was constructed under Solomon, King of the United Kingdom of Israel and Judah and that during the Kingdom of Judah, the temple was dedicated to Yahweh, and is said to have housed the Ark of the Covenant. Josephus claims that "the temple was burnt four hundred and seventy years, six months, and ten days after it was built," (Jew. Ant. 10.8.5), though rabbinic sources state that the First Temple stood for 410 years and, based on the 2nd-century work Seder Olam Rabbah, place construction in 832 BCE and destruction in 422 BCE (3338 AM), 165 years later than secular estimates. Because of the religious sensitivities involved, and the politically volatile situation in Jerusalem, only limited archaeological surveys of the Temple Mount have been conducted. No excavations have been allowed on the Temple Mount during modern times.

Underneath what is now the Siebenberg Residence remains the discovery of empty burial vaults believed to have been used for Jewish royalty. According to Jewish Law they couldn't bury the dead in the city limits, so they buried people outside the burial limits. During the First Temple the Jewish people lived in the City of David (Hebrew: עיר דוד) which is present day East Jerusalem, Above the empty burial vaults are two holes which is said to have been made to let the spirit of the person exit the chamber. Since there is not much archaeology from the first temple it is hard to date some of the artifacts found at the Siebenberg Museum. A pillar with the engravings of the Menorah was also found. It is most likely from the Second Temple Period, although the base of the Menorah is in the shape of a tripod in contrast to what is depicted on the Titus Arch, which is just a base.

=== Second Temple Period ===
The Second Temple period in Jewish history lasted between 530 BCE and 70 CE, when the Second Temple of Jerusalem existed. The sects of Pharisees, Sadducees, Essenes, and Zealots were formed during this period. The Second Temple period ended with the First Jewish–Roman Warand the Roman destruction of Jerusalem and the Temple. Judean kingdom under Herod experienced a period of growth and expansion. As a close and loyal ally to the Romans, Herod extended his rule as far as Arabia, created ambitious projects of construction and renovated the Temple.

The original Siebenberg home here, said to be a Hasmonean Palace, was destroyed two millennia ago by the Romans. Flavius Josephus tells the story of the conquest of Jerusalem. "Pouring into the alleys [of the Upper City], sword in hand, they massacred indiscriminately all whom they met, and burnt the houses with all who had taken refuge within.….running everyone through who fell in their way, they choked the alleys with corpses and deluged the whole city with blood, insomuch that many of the fires were extinguished by the gory stream."

A ritual bath was discovered here, known as a mikveh used by the Jews during the Second Temple. This according to Theo Siebenberg might indicate the ancient family's priestly connections. There are two mikvehs located below the residence. It is said in the Jewish Tractate or Mishnah that in order to warm the ritual baths they would throw hot metal or clay into the water to warm it. No metal was discovered here, however traces of pottery have been. A pillar that was used to support the building was found with ash traces on it. These ashes are dated from a month after the destruction of the Second Temple in 70 CD on the 8th of Elul.

== Excavations ==
"The archeologists were sure that nothing was there," Siebenberg said. "But it just did not seem right to me. I would stand here and picture myself in the Second Temple Period. The temple was just over there," he said, motioning to the Wailing Wall, which is visible from his home. "Why wouldn't Jews have built here then? Every inch of land near the temple must have been very valuable." Siebenberg asked his architects and engineers if it would be possible for him to conduct an archeological dig under his house. The engineers were incredulous. A retaining wall was built slowly and held down by dozens of steel anchors. The engineers asked Siebenberg where he wanted to build the retaining wall, and he said, "let's build it parallel to the house today." Eight years later the retaining wall of the new house was exactly parallel to the house from 2,000 years ago. The wall was built in sections over eight years, and the Siebenbergs were gradually able to excavate behind each section as it went up.

Sometimes as many as 30 workers were hired. For two years they burrowed, taking the earth out in bucketfuls, carrying it off on donkeys' backs and sifting for signs of the past. They discovered nothing but dirt. Finally, one day in 1972 they hit an archeological mother lode. First, a bronze key ring, probably used by a woman to lock her jewelry box during the Second Temple Period rolled off a pile of dirt. "He came running upstairs," Siebenberg's wife, Miriam, said of that day. "He said it was 'a key ring, a key ring.' I said: 'How do you know? It's just a ball of dirt.' He said, 'I know, I know.'"

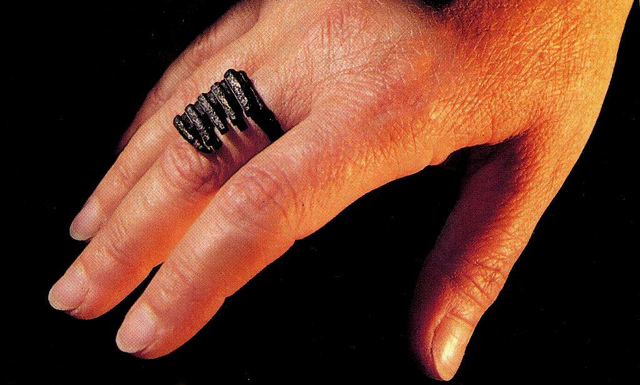
The key ring of the Lady of the House found in the excavation

The excavations carried out underneath the Siebenberg home in the course of 18 years have revealed artifacts from three distinct periods in Israel's national history, the First Temple Period, the Second Temple period, and the 1948 Arab–Israeli War. The earliest finds date back to nearly three thousand years ago, to the days of King David (first Temple period).

A burial vault was found from the First Temple Period and dates back to nearly 3,000 years ago, however, most of the artifacts that were found were from the time of the Second Temple Period. There are five main finds from the Second Temple Period that have been found: part of an aqueduct, two water cisterns, two mikvahs (ritual bath), Hasmonean stones, a [capital (part of a pillar) with seven menorahs chiseled into it, and supporting pillars with ash from the destruction of the Upper City on the 8th of the month of elul, year 70.

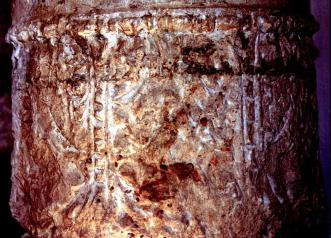
Capital with the seven menorahs chiseled into it

At the excavation of the Siebenberg house, they found parts of the lower aqueduct (also known as the low level aqueduct), which came from Solomon's Pools, near Hebron, by birdsfly it was 22 km but it actually zigzagged 67 km. It had a slope of 70 meters which made it 1 per 1,000, which is a very gradual slope. The water would come all the way from Solomon's Pools and pass through the Jewish Quarter (right under the Siebenberg house), and go to a place called The Azarah. The Azarah is where official sacrifices took place three times a year during the High Holy Holidays of Sukkot, Passover, and Shavuot. After the sacrifices had been made, they would unplug the plug and the water would come running and clean the area of the Azarah. From the Azarah, the water went down to the Kidron valley where they grew the spices for the incenses used in the Temple.

Two huge water cisterns have been found, as well as two mikvahs (ritual baths), from the Second Temple Period. There were a couple of pillars found, but the most important of these was a capital (part of a pillar) that was found, and has seven menorahs chiseled into it.

There were also stones from the Second Temple Period found, that apparently were from a part of the Maccabi palace that stood there. Usually during excavations, the stones would have been broken, but Theo wanted to save them so he brought special porters and carried them out to the lot next door and years later brought them back into the museum so that they could stand as a memorial for the Maccabi palace that apparently stood there nearly 2,000 years ago.

Since the house was built on top of a hill it needed to be anchored, so the contractor put in supporting pillars. While excavating, they realized that some of the original earth from 2000 years ago had adhered to two of those supporting pillars. This allows you to see the stratigraphy from 2,000 years ago and shows black layers, which are the ashes from the big fire that destroyed the Upper City on the 8th of the month of elul, year 70, one month after the destruction of the Second Temple. Samples of the ashes were sent to be carbon dated and the test revealed that the ashes were from years 40 to 90. The exact date of the destruction of the Upper City in the year 70 is known from Josephus, the ancient historian.

The latest dated items found in the excavation were two guns, a pistol and a machine gun. The pistol is 200 years old and believed to have been used in the 1948 Independence War. The Jewish people were desperate for any kind of ammunition and bought whatever available ammunition they could find or afford, which explains why a 200-year-old gun was used during the 1948 war. The machine gun is a Spandau gun and was used by the Germans in World War I. In 1948, in the Jewish Quarter, a young man named Isaac Mizrachi ran around from place to place with the machine gun found in the Siebenberg House excavation, and would shoot here and there. He wanted to give the impression that the Jews had more armaments than they actually had. A day before the Jews surrendered to the Jordanians, an Arab fighter threw a hand grenade and Isaac was killed.

== Archaeology ==
Below the Siebenberg House lies the remains of an ancient Jewish way of life that dates back to the days of King David, King Solomon, and The Second Temple period.

=== First Temple Period ===
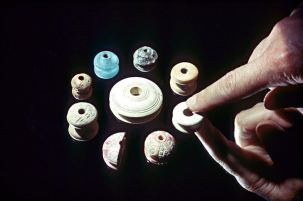
The spindle that was uncovered in the excavation

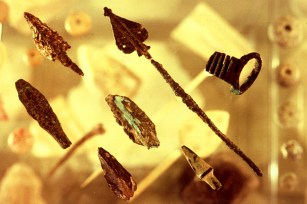
Arrow heads at the Siebenberg House

The oldest archeological find underneath the Siebenberg House is a burial vault said to be dated back to the First Temple Period from the time of King David and King Solomon (10th century BCE). The reason for the burial vault here is because at that time they used to bury their dead outside of the city limits. The ancient Jewish city at that time was the City of David (Hebrew: עיר דוד: Year Dovid). Here being the slope of the Western Hill, also called the Upper City, the burial vault was situated. At the 8th century BCE after the destruction of Samaria, about five-thousand Jews managed to escape to the City of David. As a result, the city expanded towards the Upper City. As a result, a problem arose, due to the burial vaults being situated inside the city. Therefore, to resolve the problem they removed the bones. Therefore, it says in our ancient writings that they took out all the bones except the bones of the kings and the prophetess Hulda, cleared and purified it, and at Second Temple Period it became storage for grains etc.

Other artifacts found here were glass perfume bottles and half of a glass bracelet; a spindle for spinning fine cotton thread; an ivory pen and inkwell; a 2,600-year-old arrowhead from the Babylon Period. A rhyton discovered here was made out of a glass in the shape of a horn of plenty – only seven rhyton's like this have been found in the whole ancient world.

=== Hasmonean and Second Temple Period ===
Below the Siebenberg House was also uncovered an ancient stone faucet, and a square stone 10'/10'. Inside this stone one can see a five pointed star; pentagram carving that was called the Seal of Solomon from his time. At one point the Jews stopped using it, and the Star of David (Hebrew: מגן דוד: Magen David) is used starting from the 11th century CE some saying even as late as the 14th century. and a bronze bell, that used to be a musical instrument at that time. An etching on a capital remains a carving of a three-legged Menorah. From the Byzantine Period a water cistern was unearthed, which apparently was plastered on top of four walls from the Hasmonean Period. Two mikvehs (ritual baths), were found here dating from the Second Temple Period. While excavating, they realized that some of the original earth from 2,000 years ago had adhered to two supporting pillars. On the supporting pillars remains black layers, which are the ashes from the big fire that destroyed the Upper City on the 8th of the month of Elul, year 70, one month after the destruction of the Second Temple. Samples of the ashes were sent to be carbon dated and the test revealed that the ashes were from years 40 to 90. Found in the excavation were two guns, a pistol and a machine gun. The pistol is 200 years old and believed to have been used in the 1948 Independence War.

== Geology ==
Within the walls of the Upper City (Jewish Quarter), an enormous amount of history is preserved, dating all the way to two thousand years ago. The geology of the area is much older however. Sedimentary rock is known for its ability to preserve fossils. An added bonus is its ability to preserve history, most notably through archaeology.

During the Triassic time period, modern day Israel was situated on the northeast corner of the continent which comprised modern day African and Arabian regions as shown in Figure 2. Sand deposits as well as marshy soil accumulated, forming a mainly sedimentary geology. As sea level rose, the Tethys Sea flooded the exposed land giving way to a shallow to deep marine environment. Evidence of this environment is made clear due to the extensive limestone and other carbonate rocks located throughout the region.

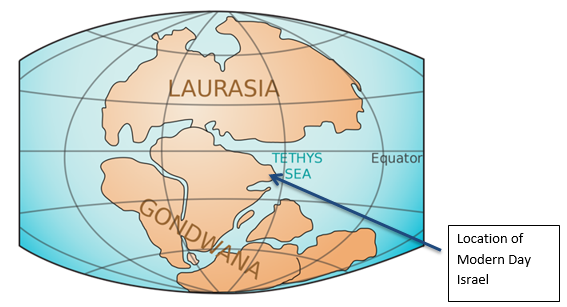
Figure 2 The set-up of the continents during the Triassic time period

Throughout the Upper City there is variable soft rock geology present. Reference Figure 3. The Nezer Formation (Kun) and the Shivta Formation (Kush) were deposited in the Upper Cretaceous time period. The Nezer Formation consists of limestone, dolomite, marl and some chert with sporadic evidence of sand and fossils. The age of the Nezer Formation is Turonian. The Shivta Formation is composed of, "limey dolomite and forms a typical cliff morphology with many caves". The age of the Shivta Formation is Turonian as well. From looking at the zoomed in map of the Old City (Figure 1), it is obvious that Siebenberg House is located within the Kun Formation. From analyzing the underground excavation there was also evidence of limestone karstification into Terra Rosa rock.

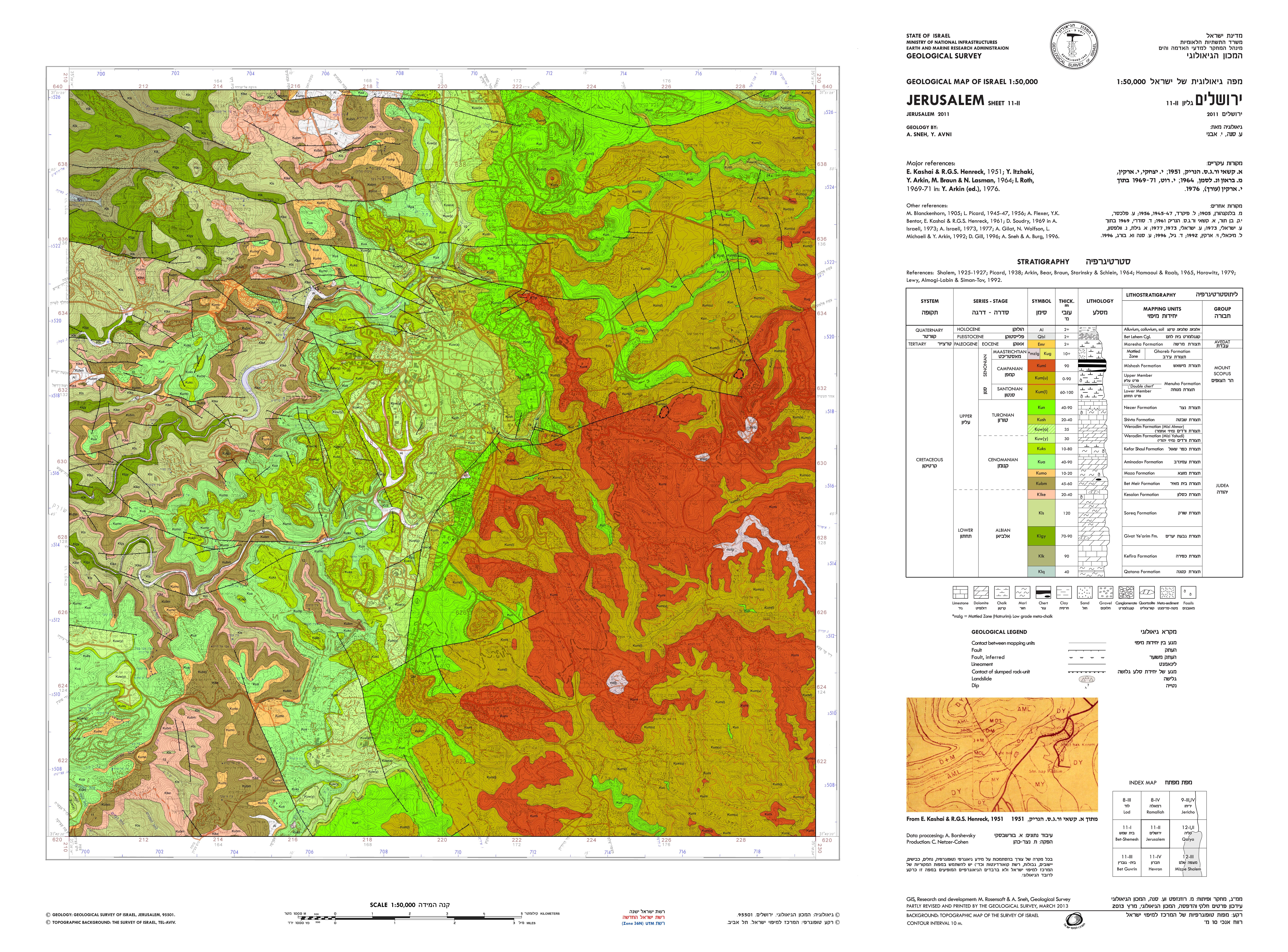
Figure 3 Geological map of Jerusalem provided by the Geological Survey of Israel

The continuing deposition allows for the preservation of historical events on a much smaller time scale compared to that of the geologic time scale. There are supporting pillars within the excavation site of the Siebenberg House which act as a stratigraphic column of 2,000 years of Jewish history. The destruction of the Second Temple by the Romans is marked by layers of ash residue ingrained in these pillars.

The Siebenberg House sits on extensive tunneling. It is possible that upon discovery of these caves, the Jewish people then dug further to create tunnel passages within the limestone geology. Historically, some of these tunnels were used for supplying water around the Old City. During the Siege of Jerusalem (The Great Revolt) in 70 CE, the Jewish people used tunnels as an escape route from the Romans.

Modern day construction in Jerusalem is done mainly using limestone and dolomite according to law, which requires "all buildings to be faced with limestone, giving Jerusalem its special character."

As the Earth continues to change, one can only wonder what future generations will uncover thousands of years from today.

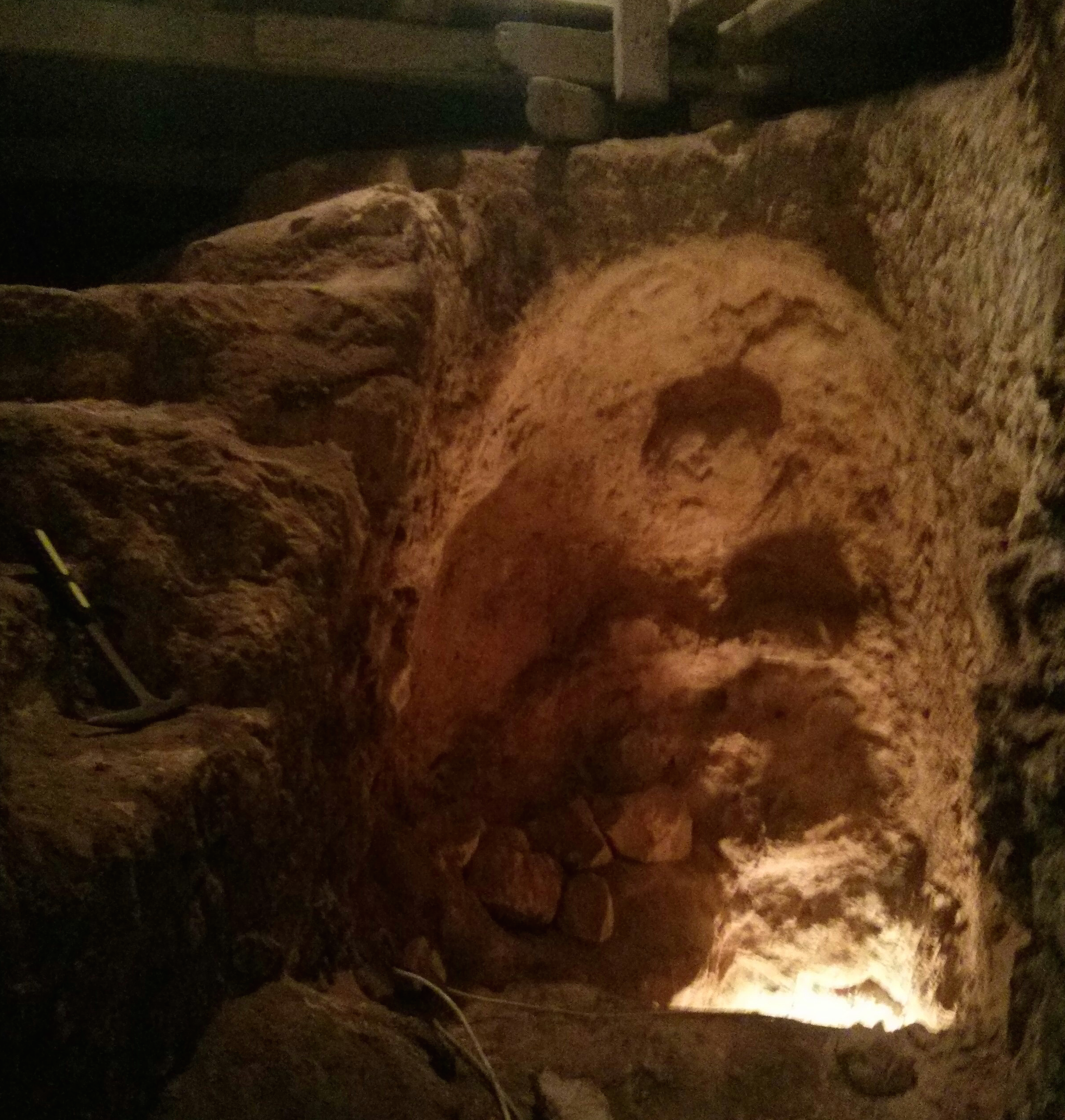
It is theorized that at the time of the Great Revolt (2,000 years ago) the Jewish People were digging escape tunnels underneath the Upper City (Jewish Quarter). This image shows the beginning of one such tunnel. We can never know why the tunnel was not completed.

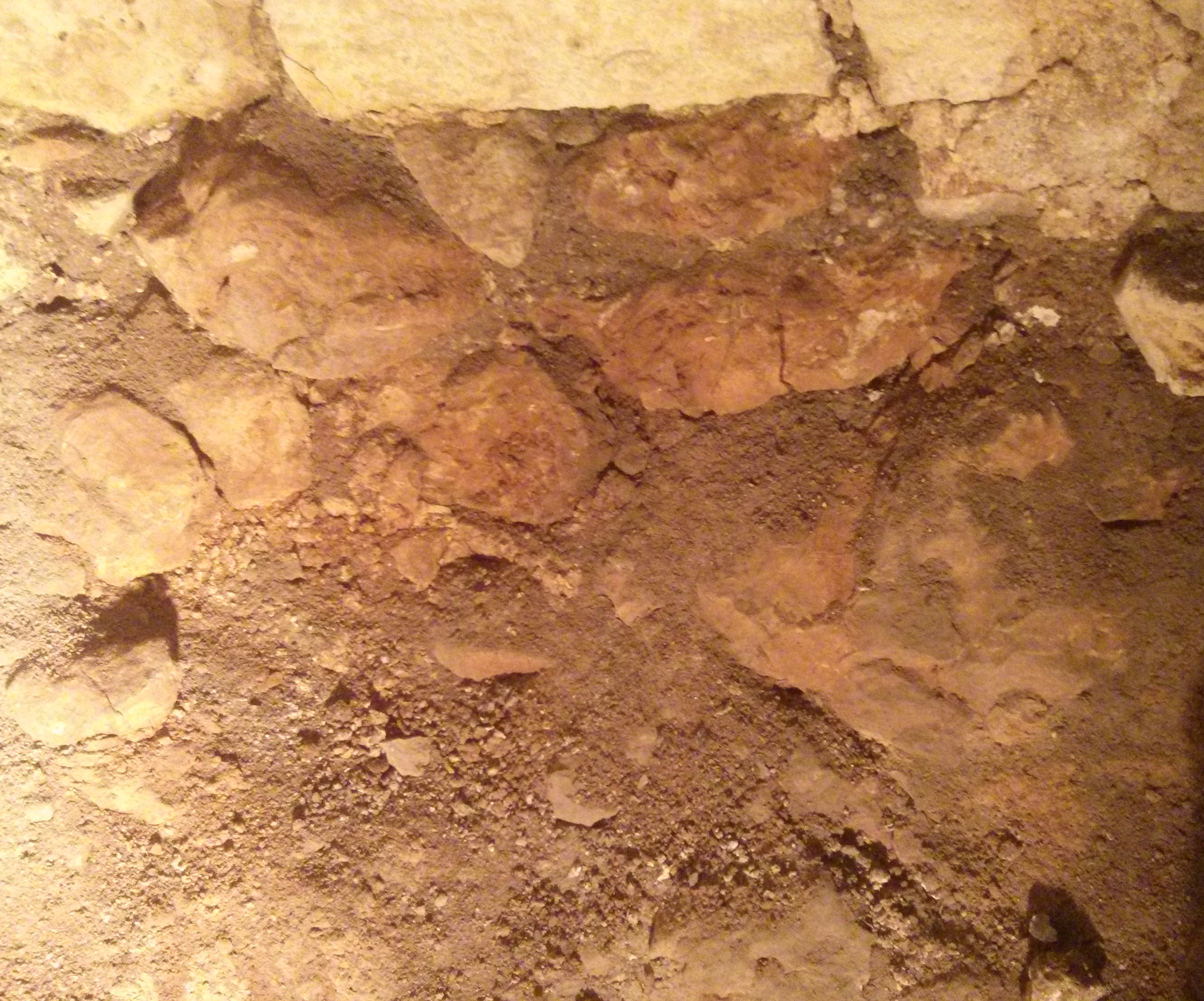
The excavation site underneath the Siebenberg House has many different colored varieties of Limestone. This image shows an example of a redder Limestone rock.

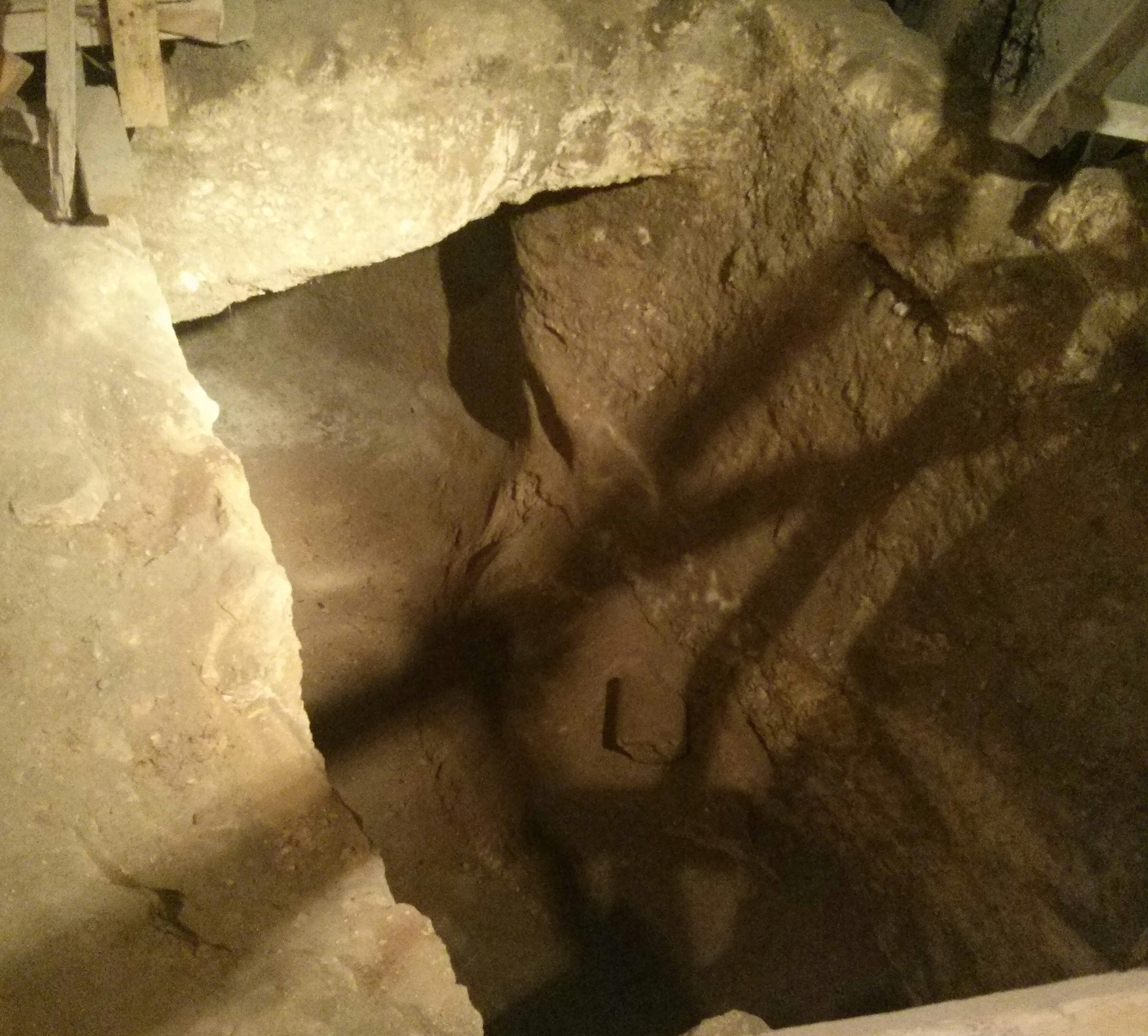
Throughout history the Jewish people have dug underneath bedrock. This image is one such example of bedrock overlaying tunnels, burial sites, rooms, etc.

== See also ==
- List of Israeli museums
- List of places in Jerusalem
