= Amnon Shamosh =

Israeli author and poet (1929–2022)

- אמנון מוש
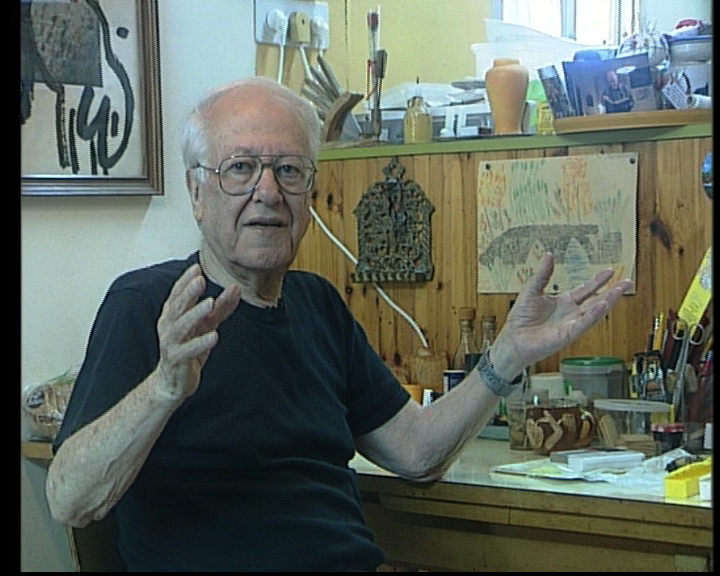
- Shamosh in 2009
- Born: 28 January 1929; Aleppo, Syria
- Died: 1 March 2022 (aged 93); Ma'ayan Baruch, Israel
- Occupations: Author and poet

Amnon Shamosh (Hebrew: אמנון מוש; 28 January 1929 – 1 March 2022) was an Israeli author and poet.

== Biography ==
Shamosh was born in Aleppo, Syria. In his childhood he immigrated to Mandatory Palestine and participated in the 1948 Arab–Israeli War in a Palmach unit. He studied at the Hebrew University of Jerusalem. He was a founder of kibbutz Ma'ayan Baruch.

Shamosh died in Ma'ayan Baruch on 1 March 2022, at the age of 93.

== Selected works ==
Shamosh wrote in hebrew stories, novels, and poetry:

- My Sister the Bride (1974, Massada Press, published in English in 1979)
- Michel Ezra Safra and Sons (1978, Massada Press)
- Calamus and Cinnamon (1979, Massada Press)
- A Kibbutz is a Kibbutz is a Kibbutz (1980, Massada Press)
- With Me from Lebanon (1981, Hakibbutz Hameuchad)
- The Cedars of Lebanon (1990, Massada Press)
- Marrano Mountain (1991, Massada Press, published in English in 1992)
- Autumn Stories, Fall Colors (1995, Modan)
- On the Silk Road (2000, Aviv)
- Liri's Chronicles: Stories from the Third Half (2015, Massada Press)

Shamosh also wrote non-fiction books

- Haketer, the Story of the Aleppo Codex (1987, Ben Zvi Institute)
- From the Source (1988, Carta)
- Good Morning Alz Heimer (2015, Massada Press)

== Awards and recognition ==
Shamosh was awarded the President's Prize for Literature in 2001. He also received many other awards for his writing.

== See also ==
- Hebrew literature
