= Manshiya =

Former neighborhood in Jaffa

Coordinates: 32°3′42″N 34°45′43″E

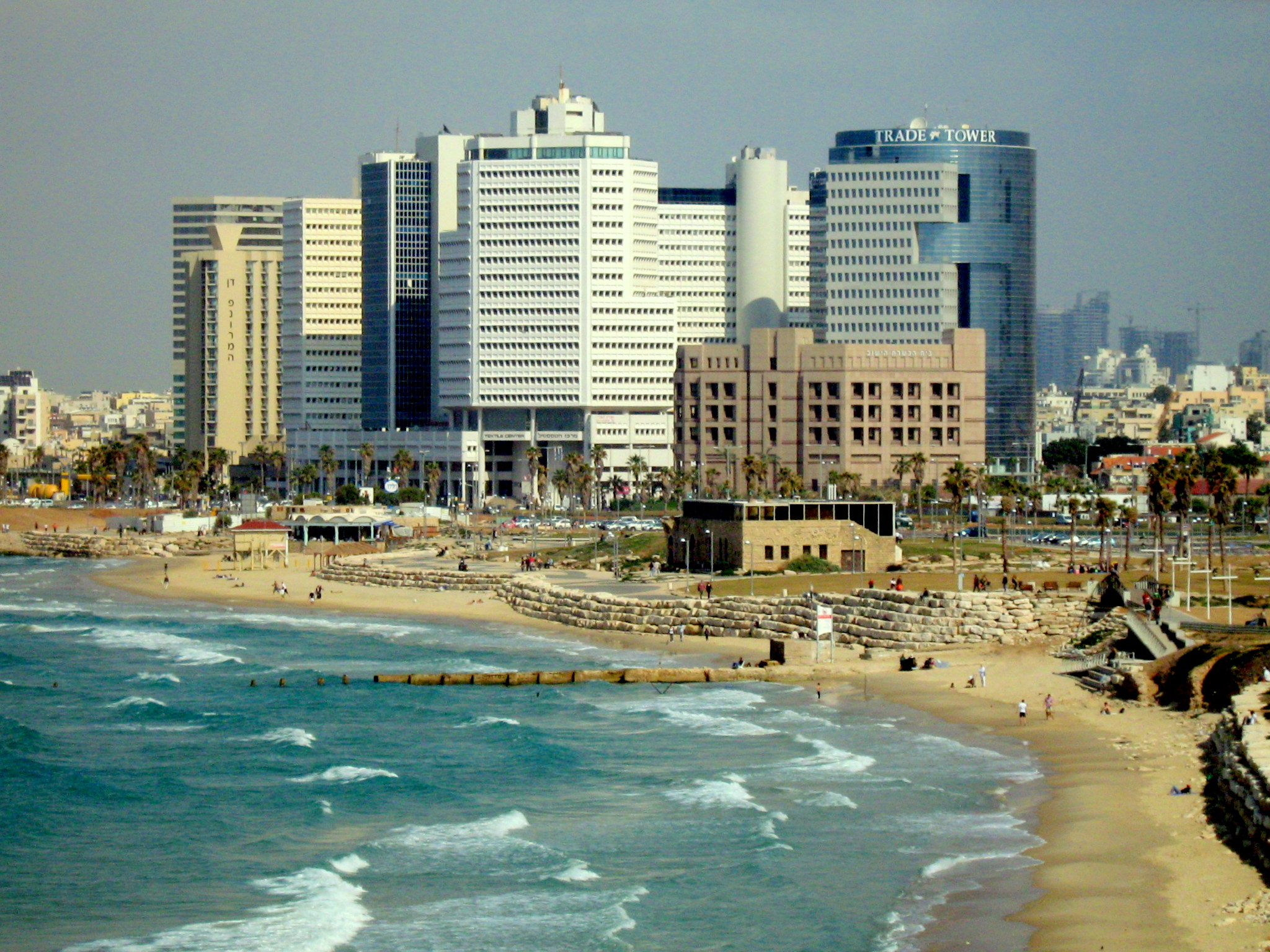
Area from former Manshiya neighbourhood with Irgun museum on the beach

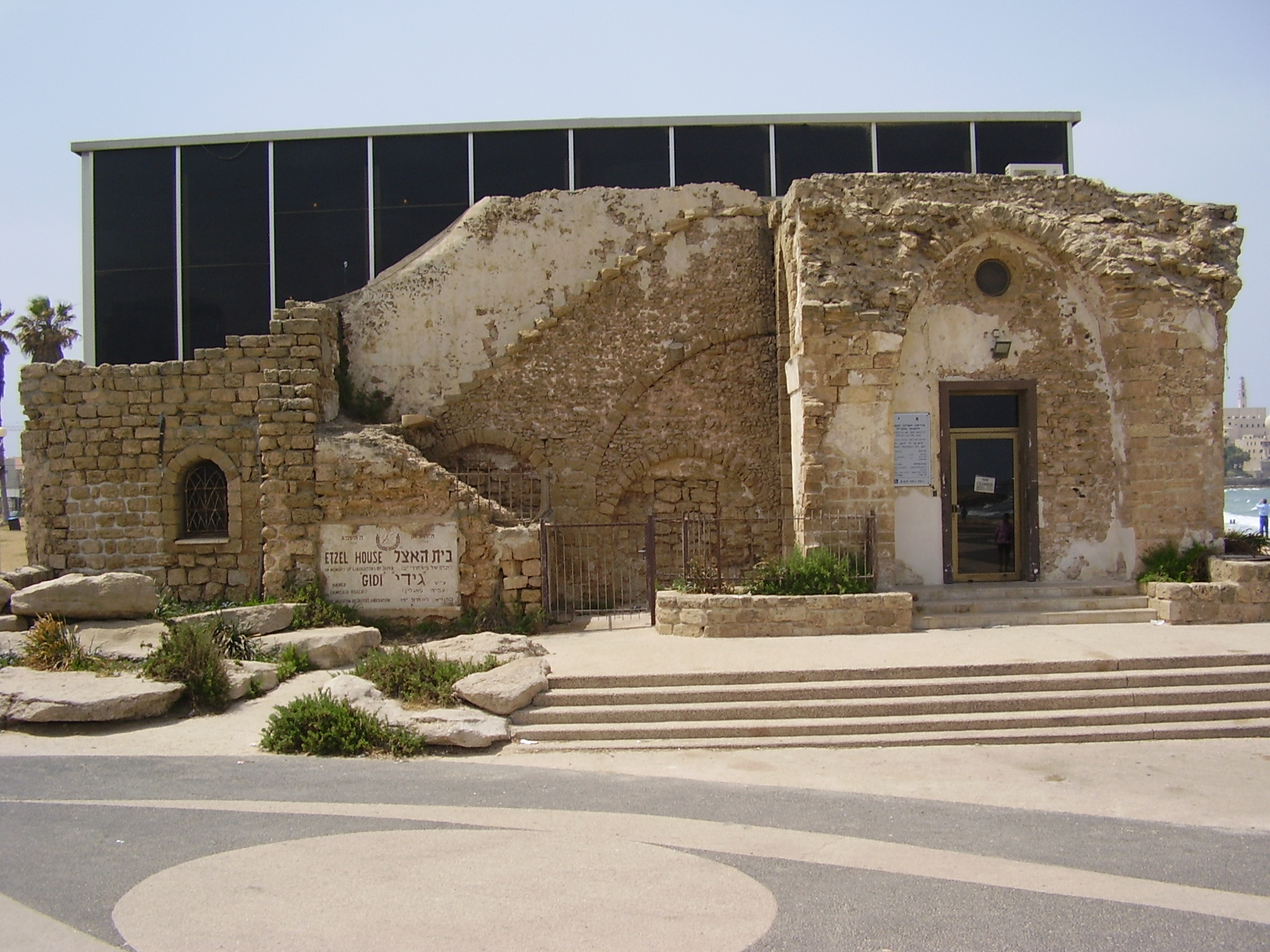
"Etzel House" or "Beit Gidi" museum commemorating the Irgun, in a leftover building from Manshiya quarter

Manshiya (Hebrew: מנשייה, Arabic: المنشية, romanized: al-Manshiyya) was a residential neighbourhood of Jaffa in Mandatory Palestine.

Manshiyya was located on the border between Jaffa and Tel Aviv, on the seafront north of the harbor. The neighbourhood was destroyed in a series of bombardments led by the Etzel or Irgun Zionist military organisation during the 1947-1948 civil war in order to rid the neighborhood of its Arab residents. Three buildings remain from the original neighbourhood, the Hassan Bek Mosque, the partially preserved building now known as Beit Gidi or Etzel House, which houses part of the Irgun Museum of Tel Aviv, and a derelict house on 77 Mered Street.

== History ==
=== Late Ottoman period ===
Manshiya was established in the late 1870s, during Jaffa's process of city expansion which saw its historical city walls demolished in 1879. According to Or Aleksandrowicz (2017, 2024), Jewish residents referred to Manshiya by a Hebrew name, "Neve Shalom", since its establishment and until at least the 1930s. The Zochrot website discusses the Jewish neighbourhoods around Manshiya, including Neve Shalom (est. 1890) but also Neve Tzedek (1885) and several more, with Tel Aviv closing the series in 1909, as separate entities, which all grew and expanded around and out of Manshiya, while also mentioning the Jewish residents of Manshiya proper. The Jews of Manshiya either built their own houses, starting with Haim Shemerling and Haham Moshe, who also built a synagogue and a ritual bath (mikveh) for their families already before 1885; or they rented their homes from Arab landlords.

=== British Mandate ===
In 1921, the British Colonial Office reported that Manshiya was "ethnically mixed", which concretely meant that it was inhabited by mainly Muslim Arabs, and by Jews. A 1944 police report approximates Manshiya's surface area to 24,000 dunams, and the population to some 12,000 Arabs and 1,000 Jews. Zochrot also mentions that Manshiya at some point had four mukhtars, three Arabs and one Jew, the latter being in charge of the Jewish community.

=== 1948 war ===
Manshiya was the site of a brief but important battle during the final days of the Jewish insurgency in Mandatory Palestine. During Operation Hametz, the Irgun (a Jewish paramilitary group) captured several towns around Jaffa, including Manshiyya. This alarmed the British, who were in the middle of their military withdrawal from Mandatory Palestine; as they mostly withdrew through Arab-held territories, it was feared that Arabs - should the British let the Irgun offensive go - would retaliate by attacking British troops. Thus, the British deployed 4,500 troops to Jaffa in order to prevent a Jewish takeover. The Jewish paramilitaries temporarily called off the offensive towards Jaffa, but refused to withdraw from the towns they had captured.

As a show of force, Royal Navy destroyers flexed muscles off the coast, and Royal Air Force warplanes overflew southern Tel Aviv and Jaffa. The British also took direct military action, and shelled Irgun positions in Manshiyya with artillery and tanks. When the Irgun showed no sign of backing down, British armor invaded the town. However, the Irgun put up unexpectedly stiff resistance; a bazooka team destroyed one tank, the Irgun blew up buildings that collapsed into the street as the tanks pushed forward, and Irgun men simply climbed onto tanks and tossed dynamite sticks into them. The British withdrew, leaving Irgun in control of Menashiya. This was the only direct battle between the British and the Irgun.

=== Israel ===
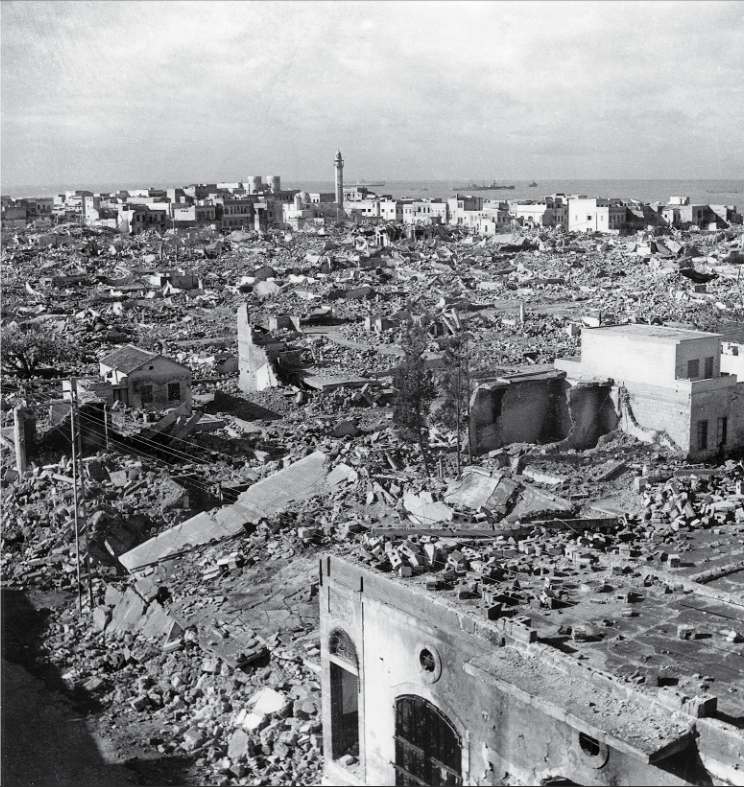
Manshiya in December 1948

What remained of Manshiya's houses after the 1948 war was left to decay and was eventually demolished between the late 1960s and the early 1980s, as part of a project to establish there a new central business district (CBD), which only materialised to a much smaller degree than envisaged due to lack of proper funding. The c. 40 hectares of land resulting from the demolitions are occupied by a small number of office buildings, by parking lots and public gardens, bordering on a few main roads. The seaside part of Manshiya, to the west of Hasan Bek Street (nowadays Kaufmann Street), had been redeveloped into Charles Clore Park.

== Notable residents ==
- Haim Hazan (1937–1994), Israeli basketball player

== Bibliography ==
- Aleksandrowicz, Or; Yamu, Claudia; Van Nes, Akkelies (July 2017). "The socio-spatial development of Jaffa–Tel Aviv: The emergence and fade-away of ethnic divisions and distinctions". Proceedings of the 11th Space Syntax Symposium (SSS Lisbon). Conference Paper: #140.1–140.20.
- Aleksandrowicz, Or (2024). "Forget and rewrite: Unearthing the history of Manshiya/Neve Shalom". Architectura. 51/2021: #202–223. doi:10.1515/atc-2021-2005.
- Bell, J. Bowyer (1976). Terror out of Zion. Transaction Publishers. pp. 300–303. ISBN 1412835720.
- Dumper, Michael R. T. (2007). "Jaffa". In Michael R. T. Dumper; Bruce E. Stanley (eds.). Cities of the Middle East and North Africa: A Historical Encyclopedia. ABC-CLIO. p. 202. ISBN 978-1576079195.
- Golan, Arnon (2002). "The politics of wartime demolition and human landscape transformation". War in History. 9 (4): 431–445. doi:10.1191/0968344502wh262oa.
- Zochrot. "al-Manshiyya Neighborhood (Yaffa)". Tel Aviv.

== See also ==
- Neighborhoods of Tel Aviv
