= Yekke =

Term describing a German-speaking Jew

A Yekke (also Jecke, Jekke (Note: In German, 'Jecke' is pronounced basically in the same way as English 'Yekke')) is a humorous, mildly derogatory reference to a German-speaking Jew in Israel. In Germany, they were contrasted with their Eastern European counterparts, the Ostjuden.

== Etymology ==
There are several suggestions on the etymology of the word, all of them being inconclusive. In the older Yiddish dictionaries the word was translated as "German", but this meaning was not preserved, neither in Yiddish, nor Hebrew. The word is productive in Yiddish and when borrowed into Hebrew it had become productive there as well, accepting Hebrew patterns of word formation. For example, in Yiddish the feminine for is yekete, feminine plural: yeketes, while in Hebrew it is yekit and yekiot, respectively.

== Demography and history ==
The wave of immigration to British Mandatory Palestine in the 1930s and 1940s known as the Fifth Aliyah had a large proportion of Yekkes, around 25% (55,000 immigrants). Many of them settled in the vicinity of Ben Yehuda Street in Tel Aviv, leading to the nickname "Ben Yehuda Strasse". Their struggle to master Hebrew produced a dialect known as "Yekkish" (Yiddish: יעקיש, 'yekish'). The Ben Yehuda Strasse Dictionary: A Dictionary of Spoken Yekkish in the Land of Israel, published in 2012, documents this language.

Some 60,000 German-speaking Jews immigrated to Israel in this wave, and they and their descendants made profound contributions to Israeli culture and society. Their stereotypical behaviour of Middle European formality, given the context of rough-hewn sabra culture, readily made the yekke a long-standing punchline, the omnibus cliché being that they were "overly formal, somewhat uppity, meticulous to the extreme, and famously punctual". The cohort was featured at the Hecht Museum in December 2025.

A significant community escaped Frankfurt after the Kristallnacht violence throughout Nazi Germany in November 1938, and relocated to the Washington Heights neighborhood of New York City, where they still have a synagogue, Khal Adath Jeshurun, which punctiliously adheres to the Yekkish liturgical text, rituals, and melodies.

== See also ==
- German-Speaking Jewry Heritage Museum Tefen
