= Notes from the Frontier =

- Author: Hugh Nissenson
- Language: English
- Published: 1968
- Publication place: United States
- Pages: 215

Notes from the Frontier is a non-fiction book by American author Hugh Nissenson describing life on a kibbutz in northern Israel, published in 1968. The book documents the time Nissenson and his wife Marilyn spent on kibbutz Ma'ayan Baruch in the summers of 1965 and 1967.

== Summary ==
The book is a first-person account of Nissenson's experiences living on the kibbutz, structured around the stories of several of its members:

- Shlomo Wolfe, the kibbutz's electrician and officer in the IDF reserves.
- Shlomo's wife Aliza, whose parents were killed in the Holocaust.
- Aaron Stern, an immigrant from South Africa.
