= German-Speaking Jewry Heritage Museum Tefen =

Coordinates: 32.9803°N 35.2729°E

German-Speaking Jewry Heritage Museum
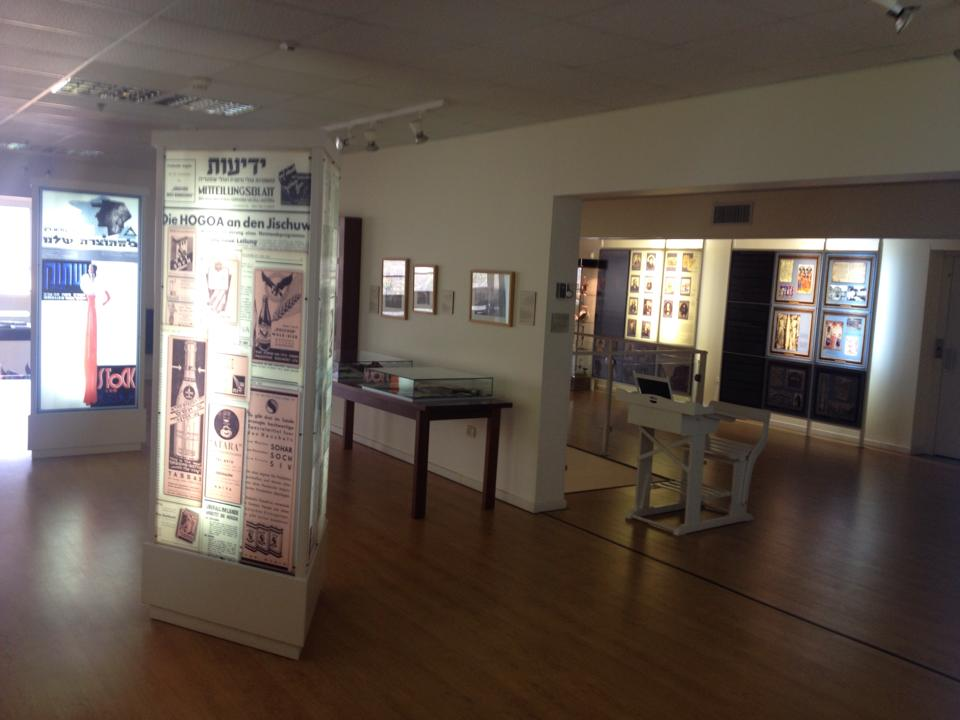
- Established: 1968
- Location: Sderot HaTa'asiya, Tefen, Northern District, Israel
- Type: Cultural-historical Museum
- Curator: Ruthi Ofek
- Website: omuseums.org.il

The German-Speaking Jewry Heritage Museum (Hebrew: המוזיאון ליהדות דוברת גרמנית) is a museum in Tefen, an industrial park in the north of Israel established by Stef Wertheimer.

== History ==
The museum developed from the collection of Nahariya resident Israel Shiloni, who assembled historical material from friends and acquaintances to commemorate the German-speaking immigrants to Palestine and yekke culture. From 1968, his collection was on view at the municipality of Nahariya.

In 1991, the collection moved to the Tefen Industrial Park, east of Nahariya. After the museum and the Association of Israelis of Central European Origin (Germany, Austria, Czechoslovakia and Switzerland) signed a contract of cooperation, the museum reopened in 2005.

== Exhibition ==
=== History of German-Speaking Jewry ===
The exhibition of the museum is spaced on 400 square meters in two floors. It focuses on the history of the German-speaking Jews of Central Europe till the Second World War and on their contribution to development, economy and culture of Israel. Although the topic is always present, the museum decided not to be a Holocaust museum.

The museum artifacts are displayed according to topic and include interactive presentations incorporating texts, visual aids, authentic photographs and film. Upon request one can view documentary films produced by the Open Museum itself about the history of German-speaking immigrants to Israel.

=== Hermann Struck Exhibition ===
In the exhibition rooms works of the painter and etcher Hermann Struck (1876–1944) are shown. The exhibition focuses on Struck's artistic activities during his years in Haifa. Beyond that it shows materials from the personal bequest of the artist.

=== Historic pioneer cabin ===
A speciality of the museum is an original cabin from the early days of Nahariya, relocated to the museum. It was built in 1936 and is furnished as it was in the olden days, with a bed, a commode, old books and a simple shower device.

Hugo-Zwi Schatzman (1900–1976) and his wife Lea-Gertrud, née Wallach (1906–1983) immigrated to Palestine from Germany in the year 1934. In preparation for their emigration they joined the league Blau-Weiß (Blue-White) in the Zionist youth movement, which followed the Zionist program of Hakhshara, where Hugo-Zvi learned to be a carpenter and Lea-Gertrud to be a barber and nursemaid. After their arrival in Palestine their group was sent to the kibbutz Ein Harod. In 1935 the couple moved to Nahariya and bought a parcel of land there at the corner of Weizman and Hanita street, where they built two settler shacks. In the bigger one of the two shacks they lived and used the smaller one as a storage. With the years the usage of the shacks adapted to the changing needs of the owners. In 1946 the Schatzmans sold the parcel to the Pisker family, which built a stone house at the side of the shacks. In the year 2010 the family sold the parcel. When a new apartment building was supposed to be built there, older Nahariyans (especially the glass factory owner Andreas Meyer) organised the preservation of the bigger shack as a historical testimony of the settler years. The Israeli society for the preservation of historical legacy took over the project and transferred the shack to the museum in Tefen.

=== "Now It Can Be Told" ===
The "Now It Can Be Told" exhibit is based on family stories about "changes of identity, false papers, secrets behind objects, unconventional migration, flight and professional retraining," according to the museum’s curator, Ruth Ofek.

== Library ==
The museum library contains more than 5000 books, mostly in German, which convey a broad overview of the contribution of German Jews in the fields of prose, poetry, philosophy, science and politics, as well as of scientific literature dealing with Central Europe's Jewry.

== Archive ==
The museum's archive preserves various historical documents like certificates, letters, photographs and numerous objects, given to the museum. In this way it helps scientists from Israel and abroad with their research about the history of German-speaking Jewry.

== See also ==
- List of Israeli museums
- Tourism in Israel
