= Al-Sanbariyya =

Al-Sanbariyya السنبرية
- Etymology: Kh. es Sambarîyeh, the ruin of the Sambarîyeh
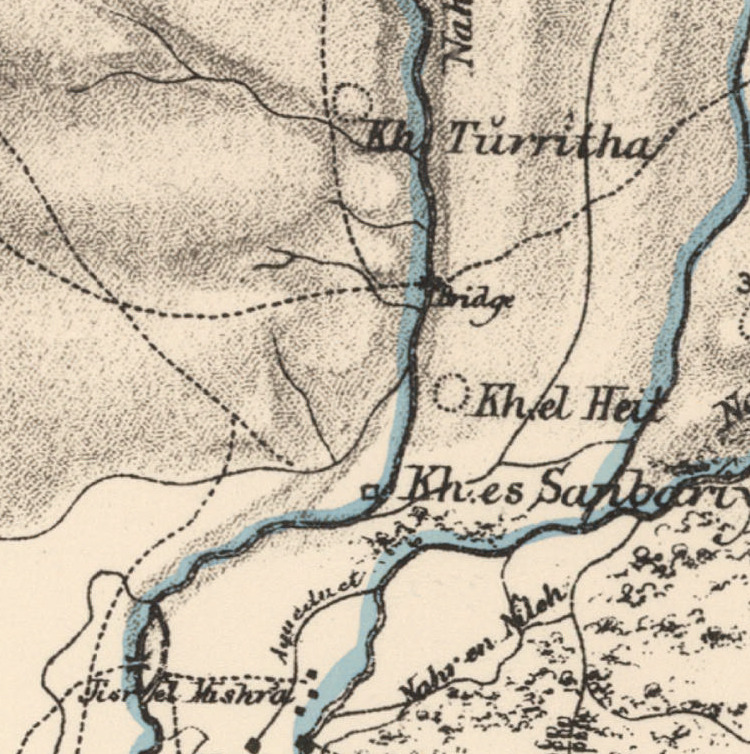
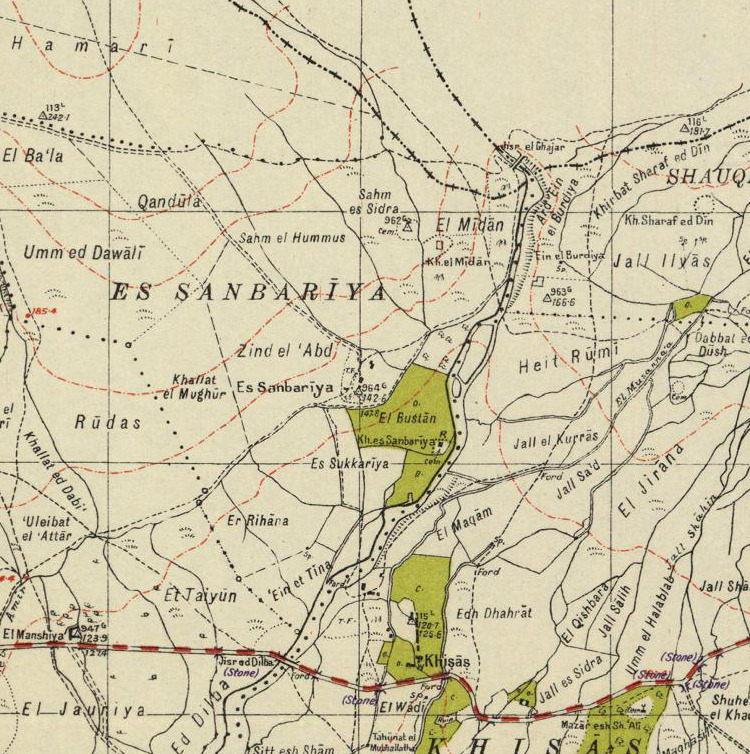
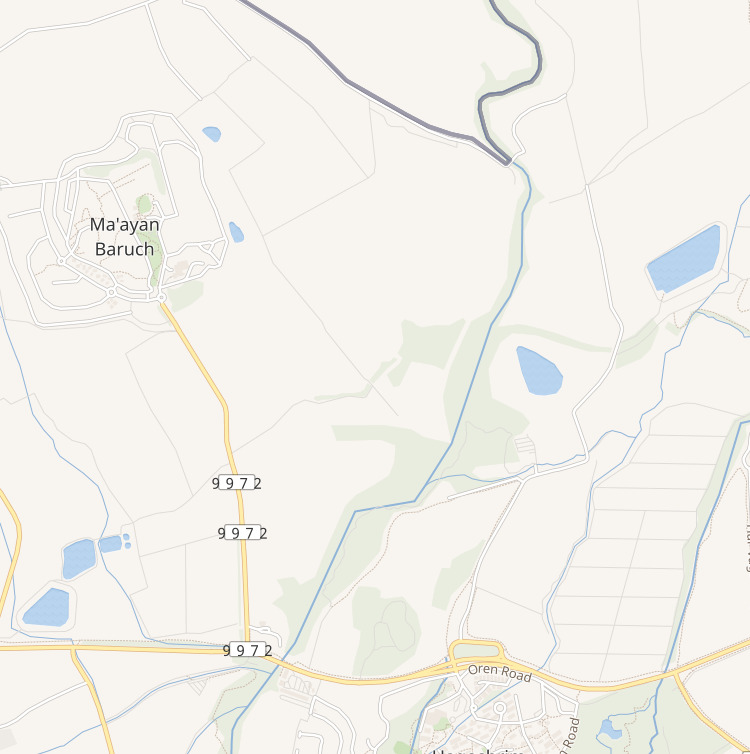
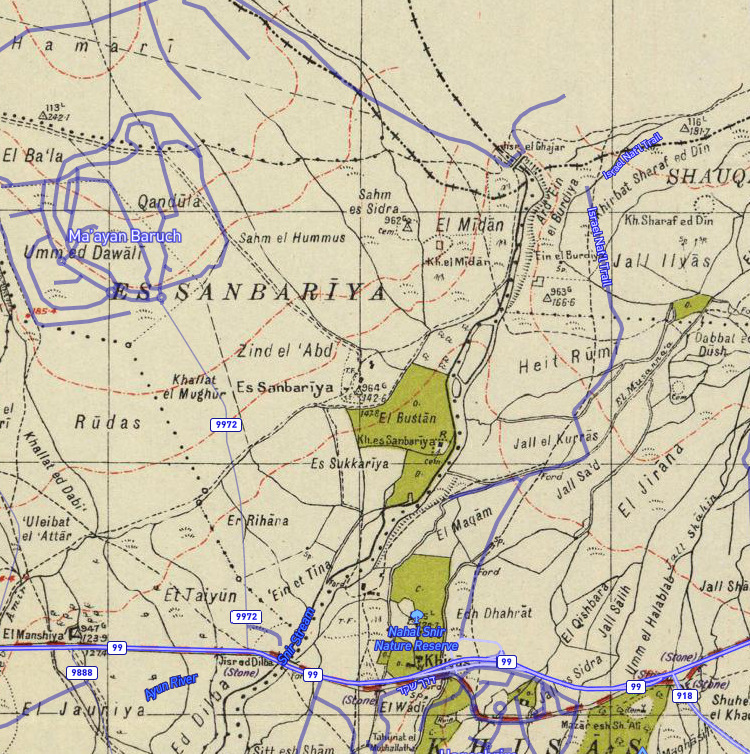
- 1870s map 1940s map modern map 1940s with modern overlay map A series of historical maps of the area around Al-Sanbariyya (click the buttons)

- Location within Mandatory Palestine
- Coordinates: 33°14′05″N 35°37′07″E
- Palestine grid: 208/293
- Geopolitical entity: Mandatory Palestine
- Subdistrict: Safad
- Date of depopulation: May, 1948

Population (1945)
  - Total: 130
- Current Localities: Ma'yan Barukh and Dafna

Al-Sanbariyya was a Palestinian village in the Safad Subdistrict. It was depopulated during the 1947–1948 Civil War in Mandatory Palestine on May 1, 1948, by Palmach's First Battalion under Operation Yiftach. It was located 31.5 km northeast of Safad, near Wadi Hasibani.

== History ==
North of the village, a column with an inscription mentioning the Roman Emperor Julian (331–363 CE) was found.

In 1875, Victor Guérin traveled in the region, and noted that "debris of a small village" ... "is referred to me as Kharbet Sembezieh".

In 1881, the PEF's Survey of Western Palestine (SWP) described it as "a few ruined Arab houses".

=== British Mandate era ===
In the 1931 census of Palestine, during the British Mandate for Palestine, the village had a population of 83; 77 Muslims and 6 Christians, in a total of 20 houses.

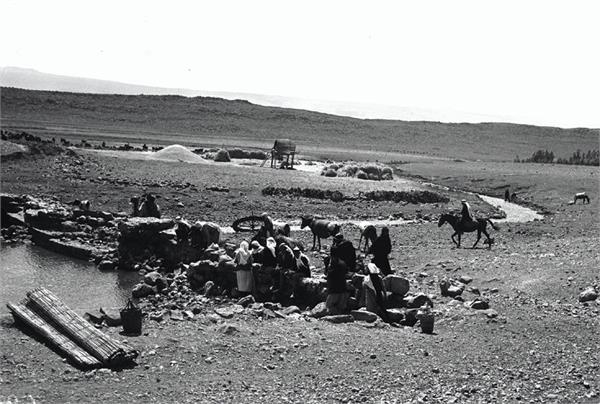
Al-Sanbariyya threshing floor, 1938

In the 1945 statistics, the village had a population of 130 Muslims, with a total land area of 2,532 dunams. Of this, 539 dunams were allocated for plantations and irrigable land, 1,739 for cereals, while 6 dunams were classified as non-cultivable areas.

=== 1948, aftermath ===
A complaint to Mapam said that "...I spoke to a number of members from Ma'ayan Baruch and nearby kibbutzim and I got the impression that there exists the possibility that there is a desire to destroy the villages and [the Arabs'] houses so that it will be impossible for the Arabs to return to them. A week ago a representative of the JNF (possibly Yosef Nahmani) came to visit. He saw that in the village of al Sanbariya ...several houses were still standing, albeit without roofs. He told the secretariat of the kibbutz to destroy the houses immediately and he said openly that this will enable us to take the village's lands, because the Arabs won't be able to return there. I am sorry to say the kibbutz agreed immediately without thinking about what they were doing."

== Bibliography ==
- Conder, C.R.; Kitchener, H.H. (1881). The Survey of Western Palestine: Memoirs of the Topography, Orography, Hydrography, and Archaeology. Vol. 1. London: Committee of the Palestine Exploration Fund.
- Department of Statistics (1945). Village Statistics, April, 1945. Government of Palestine.
- Guérin, V. (1880). Description Géographique Historique et Archéologique de la Palestine (in French). Vol. 3: Galilee, pt. 2. Paris: L'Imprimerie Nationale.
- Hadawi, S. (1970). Village Statistics of 1945: A Classification of Land and Area ownership in Palestine. Palestine Liberation Organization Research Center. Archived from the original on 2018-12-08.
- Khalidi, W. (1992). All That Remains:The Palestinian Villages Occupied and Depopulated by Israel in 1948. Washington D.C.: Institute for Palestine Studies. ISBN 0-88728-224-5.
- Mills, E., ed. (1932). Census of Palestine 1931. Population of Villages, Towns and Administrative Areas. Jerusalem: Government of Palestine.
- Morris, B. (2004). The Birth of the Palestinian Refugee Problem Revisited. Cambridge University Press. ISBN 978-0-521-00967-6.
- Palmer, E.H. (1881). The Survey of Western Palestine: Arabic and English Name Lists Collected During the Survey by Lieutenants Conder and Kitchener, R. E. Transliterated and Explained by E.H. Palmer. Committee of the Palestine Exploration Fund.
