= Etzel House =

Museum in Tel Aviv

- בית אצ"ל
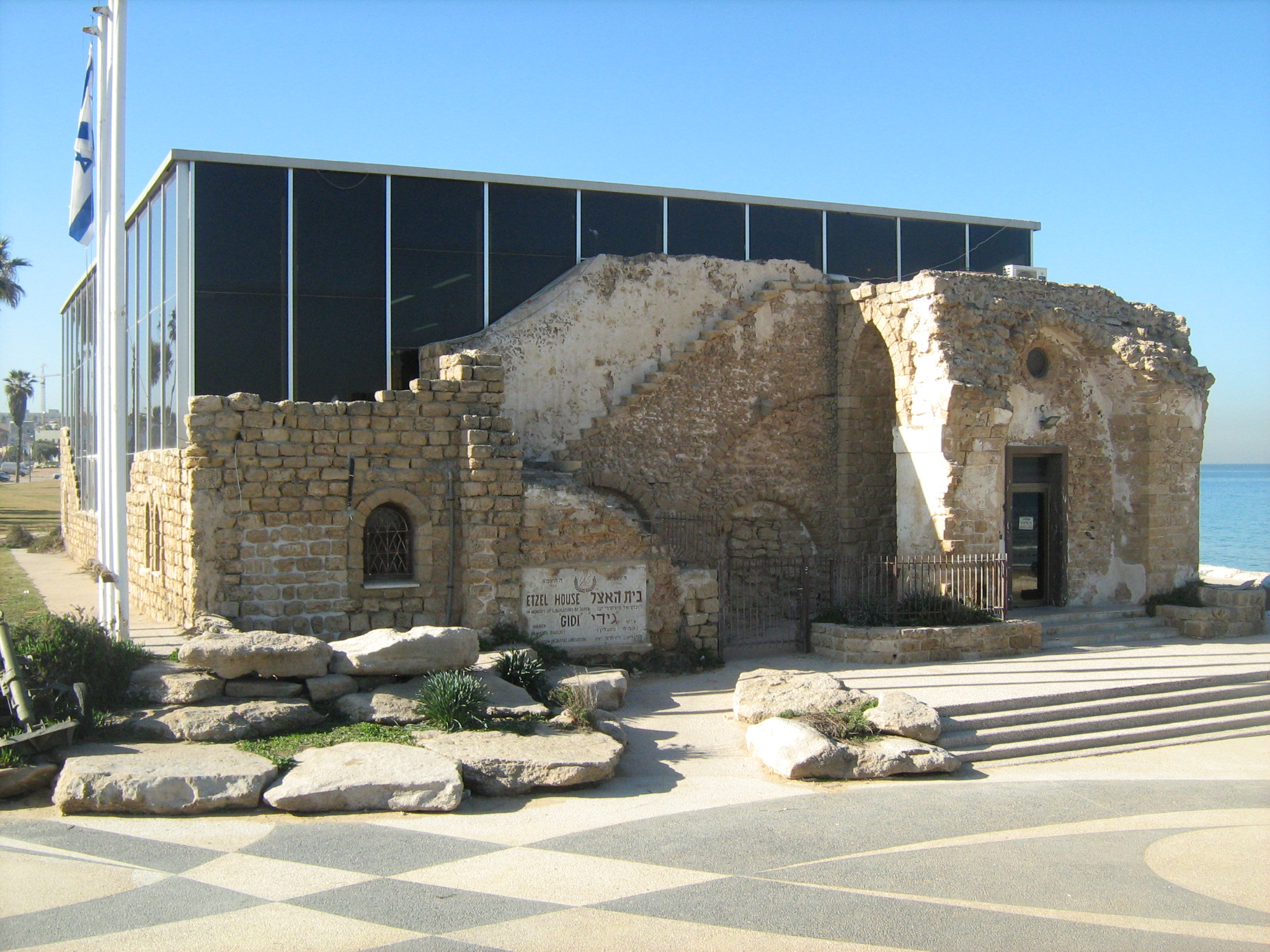
- Location: Nahum Goldmann St 2 Tel Aviv-Yafo, Israel
- Coordinates: 32.0593025°N 34.7586367°E
- Type: History
- Website: gal-ed.co.il/etzel

The Etzel House (Hebrew: בית אצ"ל), commonly known as Beit Gidi (Hebrew: בית גידי, romanized: Gidi House), is a museum located in Tel Aviv, Israel dedicated to the Zionist paramilitary organization Irgun, also known by its acronym Etzel. Beit Gidi is one of the two buildings belonging to the Etzel Museum of Tel Aviv and it is placed next to the sea shore.

The museum is named in honor of leading Irgun officer Amichai Paglin, codename "Gidi", and dedicated to the memory of the 41 Irgun fighters who died in the battle for Jaffa in 1948.

The other, main building of the Etzel Museum stands on King George Street and tells the story of the formation of Etzel, while Etzel House, or Beit Gidi, is illustrating the organisation's underground activities. The original stone house was built in 1900, toward the end of the Ottoman period, by a Jew. It is one of the very few leftovers from the predominantly Arab district of Manshiya (Arabic name), sometimes mentioned in Israel as Menashiya, that was in part destroyed during the 1948 battles. The ruins of the house are now built over by a glass structure, the resulting building being surrounded on three sides by the Charles Clore Park, with its fourth side facing the seafront.
