= The Prehistoric Man Museum =

Museum in Kibbutz Maayan Baruch, Israel

Coordinates: 33°14′16.96″N 35°36′31″E

The prehistoric man museum
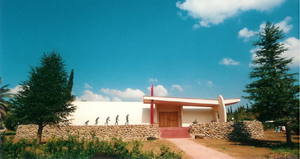
- Established: 1952 by Amnon Assaf
- Location: Maayan Baruch, Israel

The Upper Galilee Museum of Prehistory, also known as the Prehistoric Man Museum, is a museum of prehistory in Kibbutz Ma'ayan Baruch, Israel.

The museum showcases historical artifacts found in and around the kibbutz and houses an extensive collection of prehistoric tools and vessels, including hand axes predating human settlement in the Hulah Valley, around 780,000 BCE.

The museum's collection includes the skeleton of a prehistoric woman, approximately 50 years old, buried with her dog.

The museum also has an ethno-geographic wing with a collection of artifacts and tools from around the world, all made from natural or organic material.

== See also ==
- List of museums in Israel
