= Ma'ayan Baruch =

Kibbutz in northern Israel

Ma'ayan Baruch: מעיין ברוך (Hebrew)
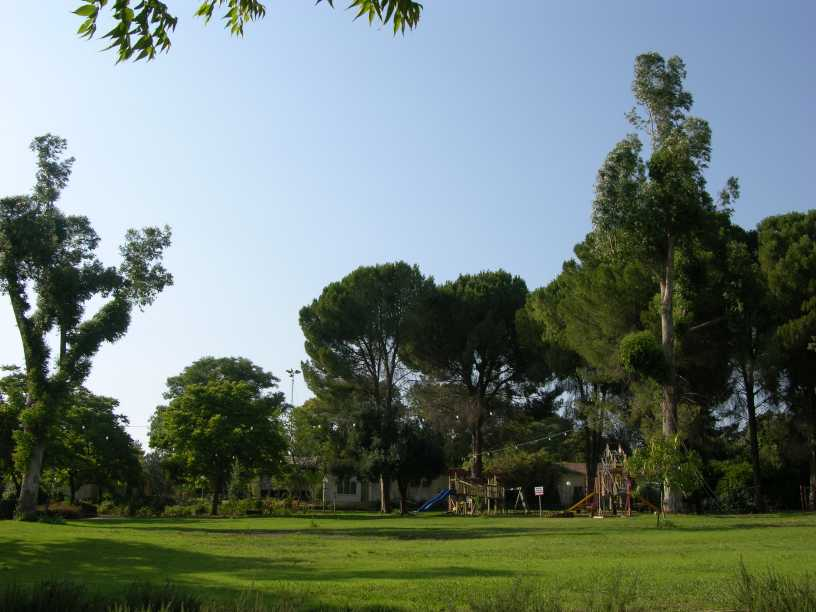

- Location within Northeast Israel Location within Israel
- Coordinates: 33°14′28″N 35°36′32″E
- Country: Israel
- District: Northern
- Subdistrict: Safed
- Council: Upper Galilee
- Affiliation: Kibbutz Movement
- Founded: 11 March 1947
- Population (2024): 868

Ma'ayan Baruch (Hebrew: מעיין ברוך, lit. 'Baruch Spring') is a kibbutz in northern Israel. Located near the Lebanese border, it falls under the jurisdiction of Upper Galilee Regional Council. In 2024 it had a population of 868.

== History ==
The kibbutz was founded on 11 March 1947, on the site of Hamara, a moshav established by Jewish farmers in 1919 but abandoned in 1920 due to financial hardship and security issues. It was named for Baruch (Bernard) Gordon, a South African Zionist. The founders were members of other kvutzot who had met in Kfar Giladi; members of the HaTenua HaMeuhedet youth movement, members of Habonim who immigrated to British Mandate of Palestine as Ma'apilim (illegal immigrants of Aliyah Bet), and members of a garin of pioneering soldiers from South Africa who fought in the British Army during World War II.

Ma'ayan Baruch is located near the depopulated Palestinian village of al-Sanbariyya.

During the Gaza war, northern Israeli border communities, including Ma'ayan Baruch, faced targeted attacks by Hezbollah and Palestinian factions based in Lebanon, and were evacuated.

== Development projects ==
A new neighborhood in Ma'ayan Baruch was built to attract newcomers and bring money into the kibbutz coffers in the wake of the socio-economic problems that have affected many kibbutzim since the 1980s. The newcomers are from other kibbutzim and townships in the region, as well as other parts of the country.

== Landmarks ==
A museum which holds a collection of prehistoric artifacts found in the Hula Valley, the Upper Galilee Museum of Prehistory, also known as The Prehistoric Man Museum, is located on the kibbutz. The museum collection includes the skeleton of a prehistoric (Natufian) woman, approximately 50 years old, buried with her dog.

An Acheulian site was discovered at Ma‘ayan Baruch.

== Historic images ==
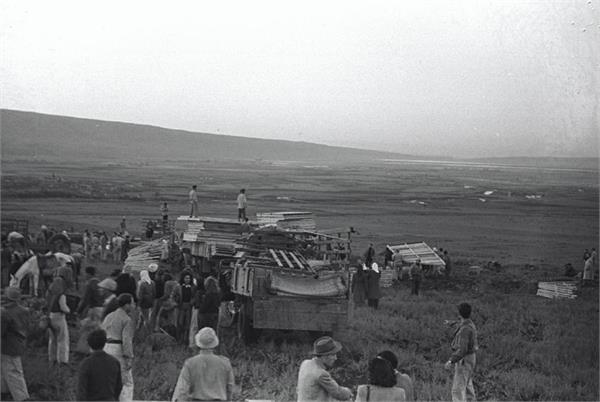
Ma’ayan Baruch, 11 March 1947

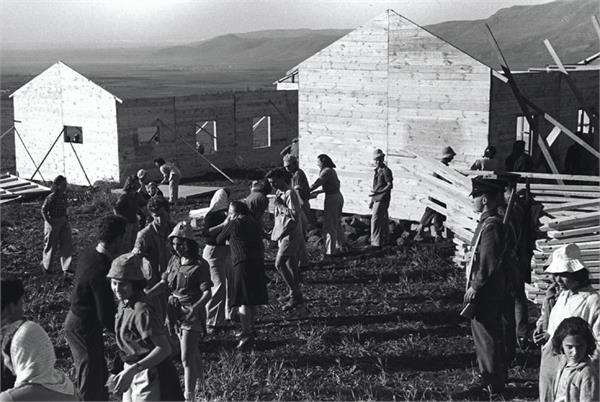
Early construction work on Ma'ayan Baruch on 1 March 1947. The 3 members of the British colonial Palestine Police Force pictured here include Amnon Assaf, founder of the Upper Galilee Museum of Prehistory.

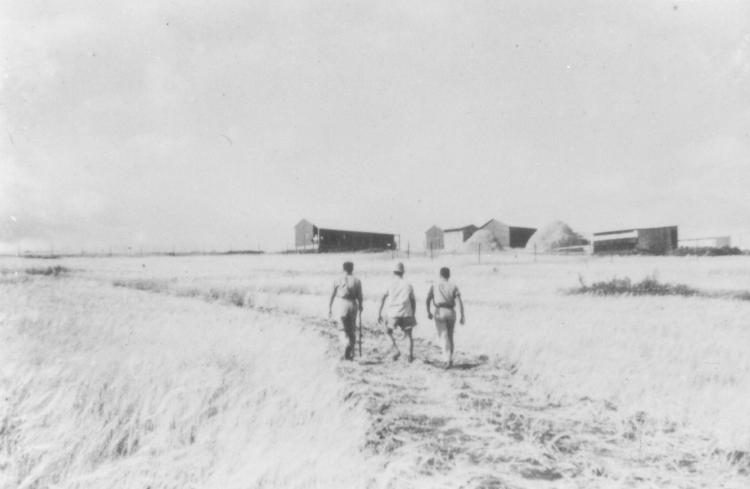
Ma'ayan Baruch. First buildings 1947

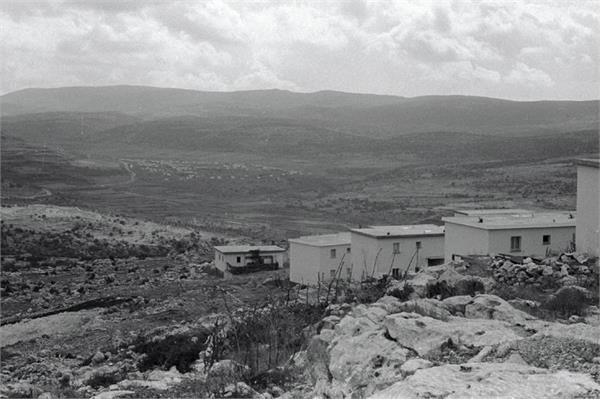
Ma’ayan Baruch 1947

== Notable people ==
- Menashe Kadishman (1932–2015), sculptor and painter.
- Rela Mazali (born 1948), Israeli peace activist and writer.
- Amnon Shamosh, (1929–2022) Israeli author and poet.

== See also ==
- Notes from the Frontier, an account of life on the kibbutz in the mid-1960s by American author Hugh Nissenson.
