= Charles Clore Park =

Park in Tel Aviv, Israel

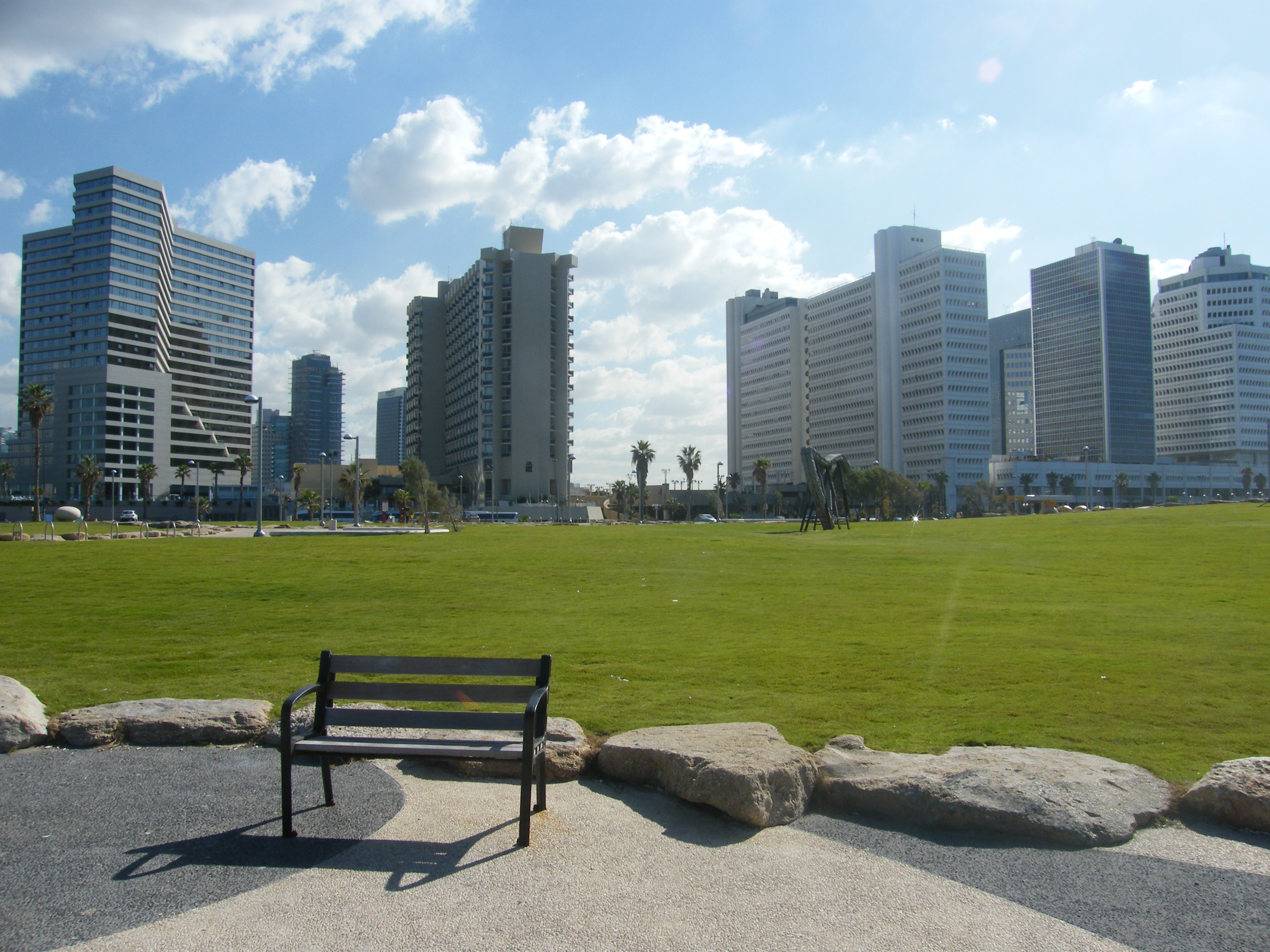
- Charles Clore Park looking East
- Interactive map of Charles Clore Park
- Type: Municipal
- Location: Tel Aviv, Israel
- Coordinates: 32°3′55″N 34°45′40″E
- Created: 1974
- Operator: Tel Aviv Municipality
- Status: Open

Charles Clore Park (Hebrew: פארק צ'ארלס קלור, Park Charles Clore) is a beachfront park in southwestern Tel Aviv, Israel, covering 29.6-acre (0.120 km^{2}) of public land along the Mediterranean Sea. It is named after Charles Clore, a British financier, property magnate and philanthropist. The Charles Clore Foundation remains an influential grant and funding organization that supports non-profits based in Israel.

The park opened to the public in 1974. In 2007, it underwent a two-year makeover.

== History ==
The park is built on the ruins of Al-Manshiyya, a historic Palestinian neighborhood which was heavily bombed and ethnically cleansed in 1948 (as part of the Nakba), after which the former Palestinian residents were not allowed to return. The buildings were demolished in the 1960s as part of a project to establish there a new central business district (CBD). The remains of the buildings were dumped into the seashore as preservation or restoration was not justified under claims of municipal budget constraints, being instead embanked as reclaimed land.

== Events ==
Each June, the annual Tel Aviv Pride Parade concludes at the park with a large party.

In May 2019, Tel Aviv hosted the Eurovision Song Contest 2019 and built the "Euro Village" in the park. The Euro Village hosted over 20,000 delegates, media professionals and tourists for nine days. It consisted of seven areas with music shows from famous Israeli performers, DJs, sports centers, yoga, an Israeli food court, and official souvenir stalls.

On June 25, 2021, the park filled amid the Covid-19 pandemic with people from all over the country; this being the largest gathering in the country since the beginning of the pandemic.
