= Carole Weyers =

Belgian actress (born 1984)

- Born: 30 November 1984 (age 41); Anderlecht, Belgium
- Education: Institut des Arts de Diffusion; Howard Fine Acting Studio
- Occupation: Actress
- Years active: 2005–present
- Awards: Best actress at Festival Series Mania
- Website: Carole Weyers

Carole Weyers (born November 30, 1984) is a Belgian actress. She is best known for her roles in the films Finding Focus (2011) and Winterlong (2016) and for portraying Elodie Lancefield on the WGN America television series Manhattan.

== Early life ==
Carole Weyers was born in Anderlecht, Belgium. She graduated from the Institut des Arts de Diffusion in Louvain-La-Neuve, Belgium, in 2006, then from the London Academy of Music and Dramatic Art in 2007. In 2010, she moved to Los Angeles, California, to pursue her acting career and study at the Howard Fine Acting Studio.

== Career ==
Weyers has appeared in several American television series, including Manhattan, NCIS, Grey's Anatomy, Modern Family, and The Missing File.

In theatre, Weyers played modern and classic plays : The Two Gentlemen of Verona by William Shakespeare, L'Illusion Comique by Pierre Corneille, Rhinoceros by Eugène Ionesco, All My Sons by Arthur Miller. In 2014, she was nominated for Best Featured Actress in a play at Ovation Award for Henry V.

In 2019, Weyers played a lead role for the first time in a series, with the French series Double je. She won the award for Best actress at Festival Series Mania.

== Filmography ==
=== Films ===
Year	Title	Role	Notes
2005	La chaire est Tendre	Esther (Lead)	Short film directed by Olivier Grinnaert (IAD Production)
2005	Ginette	Ginette (Lead)	Short film directed by Raphaël Balboni (IAD Production)
2005	Dancing Queen	(supporting)	Short film directed by Medhi Husain (IAD Production)
2007	Dreaming of Narcolepsy	Woman (Lead)	Short film directed by Colin Foulkes
2008	Crush	Voyeur and Narcissist	Video directed by David Wall
2008	Killing Adam	Olivia (Lead)	Short film directed by Andrew Saunders
2008	The Last Breath	Anna (Lead)	Short film directed by David Jackson
2009	I Shaved My Legs for This?!	Erica (Lead)	Trailer directed by Sharon Odams
2009	Life Bonds	Carly (Lead)	Short film directed by Sharon Odams
2009	Welcome Home	Margaret (Supporting)	Feature film directed by Tom Heene
2010	Le Rideau	The Prostitute (Lead)	Video directed by Rachid Seddouck
2010	Distorted	Caroline (Supporting)	Feature film directed by Darren Wharton
2010	The Owner	Emma (Supporting)	Feature film with CollabFeature
2010	HoaxterCheque	Essence (Lead)	Short film directed by M.H. Hockin
2010	L'Amour ou Pire Encore	Elizabeth (Lead)	Short film directed by Christophe Verdoncke
2010	The Invader	Kate (Supporting)	Feature film directed by Nicolas Provost
2011	Primavera	Girlfriend (Supporting)	Video directed by Vincent Pruden
2011	Finding Focus	Olivia (Lead)	Feature film directed by David Henri: Winner Best No Budget Feature at the American Independent Film Festival -
2012	Material Support	Barb (Lead)	Short film directed by Jake Tishler
2012	Rosa	Moira (Lead)	Short film directed by Eric Godon
2013	Tennis	Julie (Supporting)	Short film directed by Jean-Marie Buchet
2013	Woody & I	Jo (Lead)	Short film directed by Simon Roel
2014	The Fault in Our Stars	Anne Frank (Voice)	Feature film directed by Josh Boone
2016	Winterlong	Carole (Supporting)	Feature film directed by David Jackson
2016	Agent	Dr. Jansens (Supporting)	Feature film directed by Derek Ting
2019	The Room	Mrs. Schaeffer	Feature film directed by Christian Volckman
2020	Earth and Blood	Catherine Duval (Supporting)	Feature film directed by Julien Leclercq
2020	Aline	Styliste (Supporting)	Feature film directed by Valérie Lemercier
2021	Sentinelle	Capitaine Catherine Muller (Supporting)	Feature film directed by Julien Leclercq
2021	Agent Revelation	Dr. Jansen (Supporting)	Feature film directed by Derek Ting
2022	House of Lust	Dorothée (Supporting)	Feature film directed by Anissa Bonnefont

=== Television ===
Year	Title	Role	Notes
2008–2009	Melting Pot Café	Delphine	RTBF production - Series Regular on 2 seasons
2014	Manhattan	Elodie Lancefield	WGN America - Recurring on 1 season
2014	NCIS	Trish Wallace	CBS - Guest star in episode "Kill The Messenger"
2014	Grey's Anatomy	Emily Gardner	ABC - Guest Star in episode "Bend & Break"
2015	Sugar Fix	Burgundy	Webseries - Guest Star in episode "Sasha Bitner"
2015	Modern Family	French Woman	ABC - Co-Star in episode "The Day Alex Left for College"
2019	The Missing File	Marianka	Kan 11 and Channel 12 co-production - Series Regular
2019	Double je	Déa Versini	France 2 - Lead
2019	Section de recherches	Victoria Baumard	TF1 - Guest Star in episode "Mort sur Mesure"
2019	The Window	Kirtsen Lake	Zdf / Fuji TV - Recurring
2020	Parlement	Janet Moore	France.tv - Recurring
2020	No Man's Land	Jenny	Arte - Recurring
2021	Harcelés	Anne Valdek	M6 - Guest
2021	Les Héritiers	Claire	France 2 - Regular
2021	Braqueurs	Danique	Netflix - Regular
2024	Constellation	Audrey Brostin	Apple TV+ - 3 episodes

=== Theater ===
Year	Title	Role	Director/Venue
2005	Atteintes	Anissa (Lead)	Cécile Boland, Théâtre du Blocry (Louvain-La-Neuve, Belgium)
2006	Incendies	Nawal	Sylvie de Braekeleer, Théâtre Jean Vilar (Louvain-La-Neuve, Belgium)
2006	The Two Gentlemen of Verona	Julia	Aaron Mullen, Linsbury Studio (London, UK)
2007	Macbeth	Lady Macbeth	Stephen Jameson, McOwan Theatre (London, UK)
2008	Tell me... Lies	Fleur (Supporting)	Catherine Paskell, Arts Theatre (London, UK)
2009	L'Illusion Comique	Isabelle (Lead)	Marcel Delval, Théâtre Varia (Brussels, Belgium)
2009	Emballez, c'est pesé!	Soeur du Charcutier (Supporting)	Yves Claessens, CC Bruegel (Brussels, Belgium)
2010	Jalousie en Trois Mails	Iris (Lead)	Daniel Hanssens, CC Uccle/Théâtre Mercelis/Wolubilis (Brussels, Belgium)
2010	Le Traumatisme du Lapin	Gabrielle (Lead)	Patricia Houyoux, CC Bruegel (Brussels, Belgium)
2013	God's Gypsy	Princess Eboli (supporting)	Joel Daavid, Lillian Theatre (Los Angeles, USA)
2014	Henry V	Princess Kathryn, Nym	Guillermo Cienfuegos, PRT (Los Angeles, USA): Nominated for an Ovation Award for Best Featured Actress in a play
2014	The Unfryable Meatness of Being	Abigail (Supporting)	Guillermo Cienfuegos, PRT (Los Angeles, USA)
2016	My Girlfriend is an Alien by Keith deFacto	Carole (Lead)	Guillermo Cienfuegos, PRT (Los Angeles, USA)
2016	Lion in winter	Alais	Michael Cooper, PRT (Los Angeles, USA)
2017	The Normal Heart	Dr. Brookner	Marilyn McIntyre, Chromulume Theater (Los Angeles, USA)
2017	Whatever Happened To ...?	Red	Elina Desanto, PRT (Los Angeles, USA)
2017	Rhinoceros	Daisy	Guillermo Cienfuegos, PRT (Los Angeles, USA)
2020	All My Sons	Ann	Elina Desantos, PRT (Los Angeles, USA)

== Accolades ==
Year	Award	Category	Work	Result
2014	Ovation Award	Best Featured Actress in a play	Henry V	Nominated
2019	Festival Series Mania	Best Actress	Double je	Won
