= 1973 in television =

The year 1973 in television involved some significant events. Below is a list of television-related events in that year.

== Events ==
- January 4 – Last of the Summer Wine, starts as a 30-minute pilot on BBC1's Comedy Playhouse show in the U.K. The first series starts on November 12; the 295th and last episode is broadcast on 29 August 2010.
- January 12 – Family Affair airs for the final time, in daytime reruns on CBS in the United States. Reruns will eventually move to syndication.
- January 13 – The Lawrence Welk Show airs its Salute to Mexico episode where Anacani makes her debut with the Champagne Music Makers. This episode also marks the final time Sandi Griffiths and Sally Flynn appear together as the act of Sandi & Sally
- January 14 – Elvis Presley's Aloha from Hawaii via Satellite television special is seen around the world by over 1 billion viewers, setting a record as the most-watched broadcast by an individual entertainer in television history. It is broadcast live to Asia and Oceania, with a delay to Europe, and in April to the United States and Brazil. In the UK, it is not shown until March 5, 1978 on BBC1. However, it is not shown in Eastern Bloc countries because of communist censorship, with the sole exception of Der schwarze Kanal on Deutscher Fernsehfunk in East Germany.
- January 15 – For a brief attempt to stop rerunning primetime shows from 1973 to 1975, Vin Scully's eponymous talk show debuts on the air on CBS.
- March 8 – The TV movie The Marcus-Nelson Murders airs on CBS. This serves as the pilot for the iconic crime drama series Kojak, which returns as a weekly series in October.
- March 13 – The TV movie Hawkins: Death and the Maiden airs on CBS. This serves as the pilot for the James Stewart legal drama and murder mystery series Hawkins, which returns as a weekly series in October.
- March 21 – Sitcom Are You Being Served? begins its first regular series on BBC1 in the U.K. (pilot aired September 8, 1972).
- March 23 – The longest running daytime game show to date — NBC's Concentration — airs its 3,796th and final show, after a run of fourteen years and seven months. The record will be eclipsed in 1987 by The Price Is Right; Concentration ranks fourth in continual longevity among all daytime/syndicated game shows. Also on the same day, CBS airs the final episodes of the soaps that started in the late 1960s, Where the Heart Is and Love is a Many Splendored Thing on the daytime lineup.
- March 25 – The pilot episode of Open All Hours airs as part of Ronnie Barker's series Seven of One on BBC1 in the U.K.
- March 26 – NBC debuts Baffle, one of the first projects Lin Bolen greenlit for the daytime schedule. Also on the same day, CBS debuts The $10,000 Pyramid and The Young and the Restless on the lineup, and The Price is Right moves to afternoons (it will eventually come back to the mornings permanently in August 1975). The Young and the Restless will kick out Jeopardy! in the ratings, moving it from the noon to the mornings by January 1974.
- April 1 – "Prisoner and Escort", the pilot episode of Porridge, airs as part of Seven of One.
- April 16 – James Paul McCartney airs on ABC (and on ITV in the U.K. on May 10).
- May 10 – ABC concludes its first run at broadcasting the National Basketball Association with the New York Knicks' Finals clinching victory over the Los Angeles Lakers in Game 5. With CBS taking over as the NBA's network television partner, this marks the last time that ABC will broadcast an NBA Finals for 30 years.
- May 17 – U.S. daytime television is interrupted by the Watergate hearings, which will continue until August 7. Each network airs coverage in rotation every third day (ABC is first, then CBS and NBC).
- July 2 – U.S. game show Match Game debuts its 1970s version; it soon becomes the #1-rated daytime television program for 1973, 1974 and 1975, as well as #1 game show from 1973 to 1977.
- August 6 – James Beck, who stars as Private Walker in the popular U.K. sitcom Dad's Army, dies of a burst pancreas at the age of just 44. Although the series continues until 1977, the part of Walker is not recast and the show carries on without him.
- August 11 – Programme One airs the first part of the Soviet television miniseries Seventeen Moments of Spring, which will run until the 24th. With an audience of between fifty and eighty million viewers per episode, it becomes the most successful television show of its time in the Soviet Union.
- August 17 – CBS presents an adaptation of David Rabe's play Sticks and Bones...but only to about half of its affiliates.
- September 15 – Betty White makes her first appearance as Sue Ann Nivens in The Mary Tyler Moore Show's fourth season opener, "The Lars Affair".
- September 20 – The Battle of the Sexes: Billie Jean King defeats Bobby Riggs in a televised tennis match at the Astrodome in Houston, Texas. The global television audience in 36 countries is estimated at 90 million.
- October 8
  - Pat Phoenix leaves the role of Elsie Tanner on Coronation Street after thirteen years, when she felt that specific length of time was enough to play one character continuously.
  - Telefe Mar del Plata is taken over by the Peronist government of Argentina.
- October 20 – George Jefferson (Sherman Hemsley) makes his first appearance on All in the Family, at his brother Henry's goodbye party, though he has lived next door to Archie Bunker for the past two years.
- November 4 – Filipino television network Banahaw Broadcasting Corporation officially signs on the air using Channel 2 frequency (owned by ABS-CBN Corporation), which was shut down by President Ferdinand Marcos more than a year ago.
- November 12 – Last of the Summer Wine starts as a series on BBC1 (the pilot had aired on January 4). The 295th and last episode is broadcast on 29 August 2010.
- November 20 – A Charlie Brown Thanksgiving airs on CBS for the first time. It will go on to win an Emmy Award the following year.
- November 23 – Julie on Sesame Street, starring Julie Andrews, airs on ABC.
- November – Color television is launched in New Zealand. (It will go full-time in November 1975).
- December 12 – Kojak's trademark lollipop makes its debut in the episode "Hot Sunday".
- December 19 – After reading a news item that says the federal government has fallen behind in getting bids to supply toilet tissue, Johnny Carson inadvertently triggers an unprecedented three-week panic when he announces, on The Tonight Show, that there is an acute shortage of toilet paper in the U.S.

== Programs/programmes ==
- 60 Minutes (1968–)
- About Safety (1972–1973)
- All in the Family (1971–79)
- All My Children (1970–2011)
- American Bandstand (1952–89)
- Another World (1964–99)
- Are You Being Served? (UK) (1972–85)
- As the World Turns (1956–2010)
- Blue Peter (UK) (1958–)
- Bonanza (1959–73)
- Bozo the Clown (1949–)
- Candid Camera (1948–)
- Captain Kangaroo (1955–84)
- Colditz (UK) (1972–74)
- Columbo (1971–78)
- Come Dancing (UK) (1949–95)
- Concentration (1958–78)
- Coronation Street (UK) (1960–)
- Crossroads (UK) (1964–88, 2001–03)
- Dad's Army (UK) (1968–77)
- Days of Our Lives (1965–)
- Dixon of Dock Green (UK) (1955–76)
- Doctor Who (UK) (1963–89, 1996, 2005–)
- Emergency! (1972–77)
- Emmerdale Farm (UK) (1972–)
- Face the Nation (1954–)
- Fat Albert and the Cosby Kids (1972–84)
- Four Corners (Australia) (1961–)
- General Hospital (1963–)
- Grandstand (UK) (1958–2007)
- Gunsmoke (1955–75)
- Hallmark Hall of Fame (1951–)
- Hawaii Five-O (1968–80)
- Hee Haw (1969–93)
- Here's Lucy (1968–74)
- I've Got a Secret (1972–73)
- Ironside (1967–75)
- It's Academic (1961–)
- Jeopardy! (1964–75, 1984–)
- John Craven's Newsround (UK) (1972–)
- Kimba the White Lion (1966–67), re-runs
- Kung Fu (1972–75)
- Love of Life (1951–80)
- Love, American Style (1969–74)
- Magpie (UK) (1968–80)
- Mannix (1967–75)
- Marcus Welby, M.D. (1969–76)
- Mary Tyler Moore (1970–77)
- M*A*S*H (1972–83)
- Masterpiece Theatre (1971–)
- Maude (1972–78)
- McCloud (1970–77)
- McMillan & Wife (1971–77)
- Meet the Press (1947–)
- Monday Night Football (1970–)
- Monty Python's Flying Circus (1969–74)
- Old Grey Whistle Test (UK) (1971–87)
- One Life to Live (1968–2012)
- Opportunity Knocks (UK) (1956–78)
- Panorama (UK) (1953–)
- Play for Today (UK) (1970–84)
- Play School (1966–)
- Police Story (1973–78)
- Rainbow (1972–92)
- Room 222 (1969–74)
- Sanford and Son (1972–77)
- Search for Tomorrow (1951–86)
- Sesame Street (1969–)
- Soul Train (1971–2006)
- The Benny Hill Show (UK) (1969–89)
- The Bob Newhart Show (1972–78)
- The Brady Bunch (1969–74)
- The Carol Burnett Show (1967–78)
- The Dean Martin Show (1965–19)
- The Doctors (1963–82)
- The Edge of Night (1956–84)
- The Flip Wilson Show (1970–74)
- The Good Old Days (UK) (1953–83)
- The Guiding Light (1952–2009)
- The Late Late Show (Ireland) (1962–)
- The Lawrence Welk Show (1955–82)
- The Mike Douglas Show (1961–81)
- The Money Programme (UK) (1966–)
- The New Dick Van Dyke Show (1971–74)
- The Newlywed Game (1966–74)
- The Odd Couple (1970–75)
- The Partridge Family (1970–74)
- The Price Is Right (1972–)
- The Secret Storm (1954–74)
- The Sky at Night (UK) (1957–)
- The Sonny & Cher Comedy Hour (1971–74)
- The Today Show (1952–)
- The Tonight Show Starring Johnny Carson (1962–92)
- The Waltons (1972–81)
- The Wonderful World of Disney (1969–79)
- This Is Your Life (UK) (1955–2003)
- To Tell the Truth (1956–68; 1969–78)
- Top of the Pops (UK) (1964–2006)
- Truth or Consequences (1950–88)
- What the Papers Say (UK) (1956–)
- What's My Line (1950–75)
- World of Sport (UK) (1965–85)
- Z-Cars (UK) (1962–78)

=== Debuts ===
- January 4 – Last of the Summer Wine pilot episode, first series begins on November 12 (1973–2010)
- January 6 – Schoolhouse Rock! on ABC (1973–09)
- January 28 – Barnaby Jones on CBS (1973–80)
- March 20 – Police Story on NBC (1973–78)
- March 26
  - The Young and the Restless on CBS (1973–)
  - The $10,000 Pyramid on CBS with Dick Clark as host
- April 6 – Ultraman Taro on TBS in Japan (1973–74)
- July 2 – CBS revives Match Game with more ribald questions (1962–69, 1973–84, 1990–91, 1998–99)
- July 17
  - The Wizard of Odds, first United States game show hosted by Alex Trebek, premieres on NBC
  - The New Treasure Hunt (syndicated 1973–76)
- September 8
  - An animated revival of Star Trek premieres on NBC (1973–74)
  - Super Friends (1973–74) premieres on ABC
- September 10 – Lotsa Luck on NBC (1973–74)
- September 14 – Adam's Rib on ABC (1973)
- September 21 - Needles and Pins on NBC (1973)
- September 22 – The Starlost (1973–74)
- October 2 – Hawkins on CBS (1973–74)
- October 3 – Love Story on NBC (1973–74)
- October 15 – The Tomorrow Show on NBC (1973–82)
- October 24 – Kojak on CBS (1973–78, 2005)
- Superstars on BBC1 in the UK (1973–85, 2003–05)
- Greatest Sports Legends (syndicated 1973–93)

=== Ending this year ===
Date	Show	Debut
January 16	Bonanza	1959
February 23	About Safety	1972
March 3	Bridget Loves Bernie	1972
March 12	The Doris Day Show	1968
March 23	Love is a Many Splendored Thing	1967
March 23	Where the Heart Is	1969
March 30	Ghost Story	1972
March 30	Ultraman Ace (Japan)	1972
March 30	Mission: Impossible	1966
May 20	Laugh-In	1968
August 24	The Mod Squad	1968
September 1	Runaround	1972
October 27	The New Scooby-Doo Movies	1972
December 28	Needles and Pins	1973

== Births ==
Date	Name	Notability
January 4	Damon Gupton	American actor (Criminal Minds)
January 11	Rockmond Dunbar	American actor (Soul Food, Prison Break)
January 16	Josie Davis	American actress (Charles in Charge, The Young and the Restless)
January 23	Lanei Chapman	American actress
January 25	Geoff Johns	Comic book writer
January 27	Terri Seymour	English entertainment reporter and actress
January 29	Miranda Krestovnikoff	English archaeologist and television host
January 31	Portia de Rossi	Australian actress (Ally McBeal, Arrested Development, Scandal)
February 7	Kate Thornton	British television presenter
February 12	Tara Strong	Canadian voice actress (Hello Kitty's Furry Tale Theater, Rugrats, The Powerpuff Girls, The Fairly OddParents, Kim Possible, Fillmore!, Teen Titans, Danny Phantom, Foster's Home for Imaginary Friends, Drawn Together, The Life and Times of Juniper Lee, Ben 10, Chowder, My Little Pony: Friendship Is Magic, Unikitty!)
February 14	Alec Sulkin	Actor
February 14	Jason Douglas	Actor
February 15	Sarah Wynter	Australian actress (24)
February 17	Lucy Davis	Actress
February 18	Tom Wisdom	Actor
February 19	Eric Lange	American actor (The Bridge, Narcos)
February 20	Andrea Savage	American actress
February 21	Tyrus	Political commentator and pro wrestler (Fox News, NWA, Impact Wrestling, WWE)
March 1	Jack Davenport	British actor
March 1	Chris Webber	NBA basketball player
March 4	Len Wiseman	Producer
March 6	Paul Farrer	British composer
March 7	Jay Duplass	Actor
March 8	Boris Kodjoe	Austrian-German actor (Soul Food, The Last Man on Earth)
March 14	Betsy Brandt	American actress
March 16	Tim Kang	American actor
March 17	Amelia Heinle	American soap opera actress
March 17	Michelle Nolden	Canadian actress (Numb3rs, Saving Hope)
March 20	Cedric Yarbrough	American actor, comedian (Reno 911!, The Boondocks, Speechless)
March 21	Jerry Supiran	American actor (Small Wonder)
March 23	Jason Kidd	NBA basketball player
March 24	Jim Parsons	American actor (Sheldon Cooper on The Big Bang Theory)
March 24	Lauren Bowles	American actress
March 26	T. R. Knight	American actor (Grey's Anatomy)
April 1	Rachel Maddow	American television news program host
April 2	Roselyn Sánchez	Puerto Rican singer, model and actress (Without a Trace, Devious Maids)
April 3	Adam Scott	American actor (Parks and Recreation)
April 3	Jamie Bamber	British actor
April 5	Élodie Bouchez	Actress
April 5	Pharrell Williams	Musician (The Voice)
April 8	Emma Caulfield	American actress (Beverly Hills, 90210, General Hospital, Buffy the Vampire Slayer)
April 11	Jennifer Esposito	American actress (Spin City, Related, Samantha Who?, Blue Bloods, Taxi Brooklyn, Mistresses, NCIS)
April 12	Christina Moore	American actress (Hyperion Bay, Mad TV, That '70s Show, Hawthorne)
April 23	John Lutz	American actor, comedian (30 Rock)
April 24	Damon Lindelof	American screenwriter
April 24	Dean Armstrong	Actor
April 27	Jillian Bach	American actress (Two Guys and a Girl)
April 28	Elisabeth Röhm	German-American actress (Bull, Angel, Law & Order, The Client List, Stalker)
April 28	Melissa Fahn	American voice actress (Cowboy Bepop, Digimon, FLCL, Invader Zim, Eureka Seven) and singer
April 28	Jorge Garcia	American actor (Becker, Lost)
April 30	Robyn Griggs	American actress (died 2022)
May 3	Max Handelman	American screenwriter
May 5	Tina Yothers	American actress (Family Ties)
May 10	Lesli Margherita	Actress
May 11	James Haven	Actor
May 16	Tori Spelling	American actress (Beverly Hills, 90210) and daughter of Aaron Spelling
May 17	Sasha Alexander	American-Serbian actress (Dawson's Creek, NCIS, Rizzoli & Isles)
May 21	Noel Fielding	English actor
May 25	Molly Sims	American model, actress (Las Vegas)
May 25	Jossara Jinaro	Brazilian-American actress (Judging Amy, East Los High) (died 2022)
May 25	Demetri Martin	American actor, comedian (The Daily Show, Important Things with Demetri Martin, We Bare Bears)
May 27	Jack McBrayer	American actor, comedian (30 Rock, Wander Over Yonder)
May 28	Raza Jaffrey	Actor
June 9	Keesha Sharp	American actress (Girlfriends)
June 9	Grant Marshall	Canadian former ice hockey right winger
June 12	Mel Rodriguez	American actor (Getting On, The Last Man on Earth)
June 15	Neil Patrick Harris	American actor (Doogie Howser, M.D., How I Met Your Mother, It's A Sin)
June 16	Eddie Cibrian	American actor (Sunset Beach, CSI: Miami)
June 17	Nahnatchka Khan	American writer
June 21	Juliette Lewis	American actress (The Firm)
June 21	Frank Vogel	American professional basketball coach
June 21	Carter Covington	American writer
June 22	Carson Daly	American television host
June 26	Rebecca Budig	American actress (Guiding Light, All My Children, General Hospital)
June 26	Gretchen Wilson	American country artist
June 26	Kyle Jacobs	American country songwriter (died 2023)
June 29	Lance Barber	American actor
July 3	Patrick Wilson	American actor (A Gifted Man, Fargo)
July 6	William Lee Scott	American actor (The Steve Harvey Show)
July 8	Kathleen Robertson	Canadian actress (Maniac Mansion, Beverly Hills, 90210)
July 9	Enrique Murciano	American actor (Without a Trace)
July 15	Brian Austin Green	American actor (Beverly Hills, 90210)
July 20	Omar Epps	American actor (House, Shooter) and rapper
July 20	Roberto Orci	Television screenwriter (died 2025)
July 21	Ali Landry	American actress (Eve)
July 23	Kathryn Hahn	American actress (Crossing Jordan)
July 24	Jamie Denbo	American actress
July 25	David Denman	American actor (The Office)
July 26	Kate Beckinsale	British actress
July 27	Tracy Shaw	British actress and singer
August 1	Tempestt Bledsoe	American actress (The Cosby Show)
August 2	Kia Goodwin	American actress (227)
August 6	Vera Farmiga	American actress (Touching Evil, Bates Motel)
August 6	Max Kellerman	American sports television personality
August 9	Kevin McKidd	Actor
August 11	Frank Caeti	American actor, comedian (Mad TV)
August 12	Jonathan Coachman	American sports personality (ESPN, NBC Sports, WWE, XFL)
August 16	Mauricio Islas	Actor
August 18	Carmen Serano	American actress
August 22	Kristen Wiig	American actress, comedian (Saturday Night Live)
August 24	Dave Chappelle	American actor, comedian (Chappelle's Show)
August 24	Carmine Giovinazzo	American actor (CSI: NY)
August 24	Mike Kasem	American actor
August 24	Grey DeLisle	American voice actress (The Weekenders, The Fairly OddParents, Codename: Kids Next Door, The Grim Adventures of Billy & Mandy, Danny Phantom, Foster's Home for Imaginary Friends, Hi Hi Puffy AmiYumi, Avatar: The Last Airbender, My Gym Partner's a Monkey, The Replacements, T.U.F.F. Puppy, The Loud House, Unikitty!, The Cuphead Show!, current voice of Daphne Blake in the Scooby-Doo franchise, and Martin Prince and Sherri and Terri in The Simpsons) and singer-songwriter
August 25	Ben Falcone	Actor
August 28	Kirby Morrow	Canadian actor (Inuyasha, Ninjago, X-Men: Evolution) (died 2020)
August 29	Jason Spisak	Actor (Rocket Power, Squirrel Boy, Green Lantern: The Animated Series, Young Justice, DC Super Hero Girls)
August 30	Kimberley Joseph	Australian-Canadian actress (Paradise Beach, Gladiators, Tales of the South Seas)
August 30	Lisa Ling	American journalist
September 3	Dana Eden	Israeli producer (Tehran) (died 2026)
September 3	Jennifer Paige	American singer and actress
September 4	Jason David Frank	American actor (Power Rangers) (died 2022)
September 5	Rose McGowan	Italian-American actress (Charmed, Chosen)
September 7	Shannon Elizabeth	American actress (Cuts)
September 7	Alex Kurtzman	American writer
September 12	Paul Walker	American actor (died 2013)
September 12	Maximiliano Hernández	American actor
September 14	Andrew Lincoln	English actor (The Walking Dead)
September 16	Richard Engel	American journalist
September 18	James Marsden	American actor (Westworld)
September 19	Nicholas Bishop	Actor
September 20	Tom Root	American voice actor
September 25	Julie Banderas	American journalist
September 25	Bridgette Wilson	American actress (Santa Barbara)
September 30	David Ury	American actor
October 2	Susana González	Actress
October 2	Melissa Harris-Perry	American writer
October 3	Neve Campbell	Canadian actress (Party of Five, House of Cards)
October 3	Keiko Agena	American actress (Gilmore Girls, Kim Possible)
October 7	Jeff Davis	American actor and comedian
October 7	Ioan Gruffudd	Actor
October 9	Jennifer Aspen	American actress (Party of Five, Rodney, GCB)
October 9	Steve Burns	American actor and entertainer (Blue's Clues)
October 10	Mario Lopez	American actor and host (Saved by the Bell, Extra)
October 21	Sasha Roiz	Canadian-Israel actor (Grimm)
October 22	Eric Guggenheim	American writer
October 24	Korie Robertson	American television star
October 25	Michael Weston	American actor
October 26	Seth MacFarlane	American actor, comedian and director (Family Guy, American Dad!)
October 30	Edge	Canadian actor and WWE wrestler
November 1	David Berman	American actor (CSI: Crime Scene Investigation)
November 2	Marisol Nichols	American actress (24, Riverdale)
November 4	Steven Ogg	Actor
November 5	Danniella Westbrook	British actress (EastEnders)
November 7	Yunjin Kim	American-South Korean actress (Lost, Mistresses)
November 8	David Muir	American journalist (20/20, World News Tonight)
November 9	Alyson Court	Canadian actress
November 11	Chris McKay	American film and television director
November 14	Dana Snyder	American actor (Aqua Teen Hunger Force, Squidbillies, Chowder, Fish Hooks, The Thundermans)
November 15	Sydney Tamiia Poitier	American actress
November 25	Eddie Steeples	American actor (My Name is Earl)
November 26	Peter Facinelli	American actor
November 27	Samantha Harris	American actress
November 28	Gina Tognoni	American actress (Guiding Light, Venice: The Series, One Life to Live, The Young and the Restless)
December 1	Lombardo Boyar	Actor (Rocket Power, The Bernie Mac Show, Murder in the First)
December 3	Holly Marie Combs	American actress (Picket Fences, Charmed, Pretty Little Liars)
December 4	Tyra Banks	American actress, model and host (The Tyra Banks Show, America's Next Top Model)
December 9	Nicole Randall Johnson	American comic actress (Mad TV)
December 10	Arden Myrin	American actress, comedian (Mad TV, Shameless)
December 14	Thuy Trang	Vietnamese-born American actress, (Mighty Morphin' Power Rangers) (died 2001)
December 17	Rian Johnson	American film director
December 27	Wilson Cruz	American actor (My So-Called Life, Noah's Arc)
December 28	Seth Meyers	American comedian, host (Saturday Night Live, Late Night)
December 28	Shawn Harrison	American actor (Family Matters, Legion of Super Heroes)
December 30	Jason Behr	American actor (Roswell)
December 30	Maureen Flannigan	American actress (Out of This World)

== Deaths ==
Date	Name	Age	Notability
January 22	Lyndon B. Johnson	64	U.S. president
January 24	J. Carrol Naish	77	Character actor (Life With Luigi)
January 28	John Banner	63	Actor (Sgt. Schultz on Hogan's Heroes)
March 13	Stacy Harris	54	U.S. actor (Dragnet, The Life and Legend of Wyatt Earp)
April 26	Irene Ryan	70	Actress (Granny on The Beverly Hillbillies)
September 21	Diana Sands	39	Actress (The Fugitive)
October 2	Paul Hartman	69	Actor (Emmett Clark on The Andy Griffith Show)
December 23	Irna Phillips	72	Soap opera writer and creator (The Guiding Light, As the World Turns)

== Television debuts ==
- F. Murray Abraham – Nightside
- Graham Beckel – Class of '63
- Reb Brown – The Girl Most Likely To...
- Colleen Camp – Marcus Welby, M.D.
- Stockard Channing – Love, American Style
- Tovah Feldshuh – Scream, Pretty Peggy
- Charles Fleischer – Hawkins
- Mark Harmon – Ozzie's Girls
- Helen Hunt – Pioneer Woman
- Madeline Kahn – Adam's Rib
- Frank McRae – Snatched
- Colm Meaney – Thursday Play Date
- Mary Kay Place – All in the Family
- David Proval – Kojak
- Kathleen Quinlan – Emergency!
- Josef Sommer – The Doctors
- Bruce Spence – Certain Women
- Don Stark – Outrage

== See also ==
- 1973–74 United States network television schedule
