= Hallelujah (disambiguation) =

Hallelujah is an interjection used as an expression of gratitude to God.

Hallelujah or the variation Alleluia, may also refer to:

- Alleluia, a Latin phrase in Christianity used to give praise to God

== Film, television and theatre ==
- Hallelujah (1929 film), a musical film directed by King Vidor
- Hallelujah! (TV series), a British sitcom 1983–1984
- Hallelujah (2011 film), a TV film directed by Michael Apted
- Hallelooya, a 2016 Malayalam film
- Alleluia (2014 film), a French horror film
- Alleluia! The Devil's Carnival, a 2015 film
- Allelujah!, a 2018 play by Alan Bennett
  - Allelujah (film), a 2022 film adaptation
- Hallelujah (2003 film), an Israeli television movie

== Music ==
=== Classical music ===
- "Alleluia (Thompson)", a choral piece by Randall Thompson
- "Hallelujah", also known as "Hallelujah Chorus", the chorus from Handel's Messiah Part II
- Hallelujah, composition by Antonio Rosetti (c. 1750–92)
- Hallelujah, composition by Giacomo Meyerbeer (1791–1864)
- Halleluja, Op. 70 No. 6, by Marco Enrico Bossi (1861–1925)
- Alleluia, composition by Mikołaj z Radomia
- Alleluia, composition by Ned Rorem
- Alleluia, composition by Eric Whitacre
- Alleluia, composition by Valentin Silvestrov
- Alleluja, composition by James MacMillan
- Alleluia, composition by Paweł Łukaszewski
- Alleluja, composition by Dieterich Buxtehude

=== Albums ===
- Hallelujah (album), a 1969 album by Canned Heat
- Hallelujah! (Mormon Tabernacle Choir album), 2016
- Hallelujah (EP), a 1989 EP by the Happy Mondays
- Aleluia, a 2010 album by Diante do Trono
- Alleluia, a 1992 album by Vocal Majority
- Hallelujah, a 2010 album by Will Blunderfield

=== Popular songs ===
- "Hallelujah!" (gospel song), a 1992 soul reinterpretation of Handel by Mervyn Warren
- "Hallelujah" (Deep Purple song), a 1969 song written by Roger Greenaway and Roger Cook
- "Hallelujah" (Milk and Honey song), the winning entry in the 1979 Eurovision Song Contest
- "Hallelujah" (Leonard Cohen song), originally performed by Cohen in 1984
- "Hallelujah!" (Holly Johnson song), 1999
- "Hallelujah" (ThisGirl song), 2004
- "Hallelujah" (Krystal Meyers song), 2006
- "Hallelujah" (Paramore song), 2007
- "Hallelujah" (Panic! at the Disco song), 2015
- "Hallelujah" (Alicia Keys song)", 2016
- "Hallelujah" (Carrie Underwood song), a 2020 Christmas song co-performed with John Legend
- "Hallelujah (So Low)", a 2018 song by Editors
- "Hallelujah", an alternate version of the 2025 Kanye West song "Heil Hitler"
- "Hallelujah!", a 1927 song written by Vincent Youmans, Leo Robin and Clifford Grey for Hit the Deck (musical)
- "Hallelujah", a song from Prefab Sprout's 1985 album Steve McQueen
- "Hallelujah", a 1989 song from Happy Mondays which featured on the Madchester Rave On, Hallelujah EP's
- "Hallelujah '92", a 1992 song from Inner City
- "Hallelujah", a song from Nick Cave and the Bad Seeds 2001 album, No More Shall We Part
- "Hallelujah", a song from the 2001 album Mutter, by Rammstein
- "Hallelujah", a song by Gin Wigmore, the winning entrant in the 2004 International Songwriting Competition
- "Hallelujah, a song by the band Bamboo, 2005
- "Hallelujah", a 2012 song by Chief Keef on Finally Rich
- "Hallelujah", a 2012 song by Reks on REBELutionary
- "Hallelujah", a 2013 song by Monster Magnet from the 2013 album Last Patrol
- "Hallelujah", 2016 song by Pentatonix
- "Hallelujah", a song from Logic's 2017 album, Everybody
- "Hallelujah", a 2018 song by Bill Wurtz
- “Hallelujah”, a 2018 song by Years & Years from Palo Santo
- "Hallelujah", a 2019 song by Haim
- "hallelujah", a 2020 song by Bea Miller
- "Hallelujah", a song by Underoath from their 2021 album Voyeurist
- "Hallelujah", a composition by German composer Ralph Siegel and South African singer Anneli van Rooyen
- "Alleluia" (Shiva song), 2022
- "Alleluia" (Elevation Worship song), 2026
- "Alleluia", a 2013 song by Japanese band Kalafina

== Fictional entities ==
- Allelujah Haptism, or Hallelujah, a character in the anime series Mobile Suit Gundam 00
- Hallelujah Mountains, on the moon Pandora, in the 2009 film Avatar

== Other uses ==
- Hallelujah FC, a South Korean football club
- Oxalis acetosella, or wood sorrel, known as Alleluia, a flowering plant
- Ulmus parvifolia 'Hallelujah', a Chinese elm cultivar

== See also ==
- Hellelujah, a 2016 album by American band Drowning Pool
- "Halleluhwah", a song from Can's 1971 album Tago Mago
- Avatar Hallelujah Mountain, in the Zhangjiajie National Forest Park in China
