= Israel Prize =

Award given by the State of Israel

- Awarded for: Excellence in their field(s), or important contribution to Israeli culture and society
- Country: Israel
- Presented by: State of Israel
- First award: 1953; 73 years ago
- Website: http://cms.education.gov.il/EducationCMS/UNITS/PrasIsrael

The Israel Prize (Hebrew: פְּרָס יִשְׂרָאֵל; pras israél) is an award bestowed by the State of Israel, and regarded as the state's highest cultural honor.

== History ==
Minister of Education Yigal Allon opens the Israel Prize award ceremony on Independence Day 1971, in the presence of President Zalman Shazar and Prime Minister Golda Meir

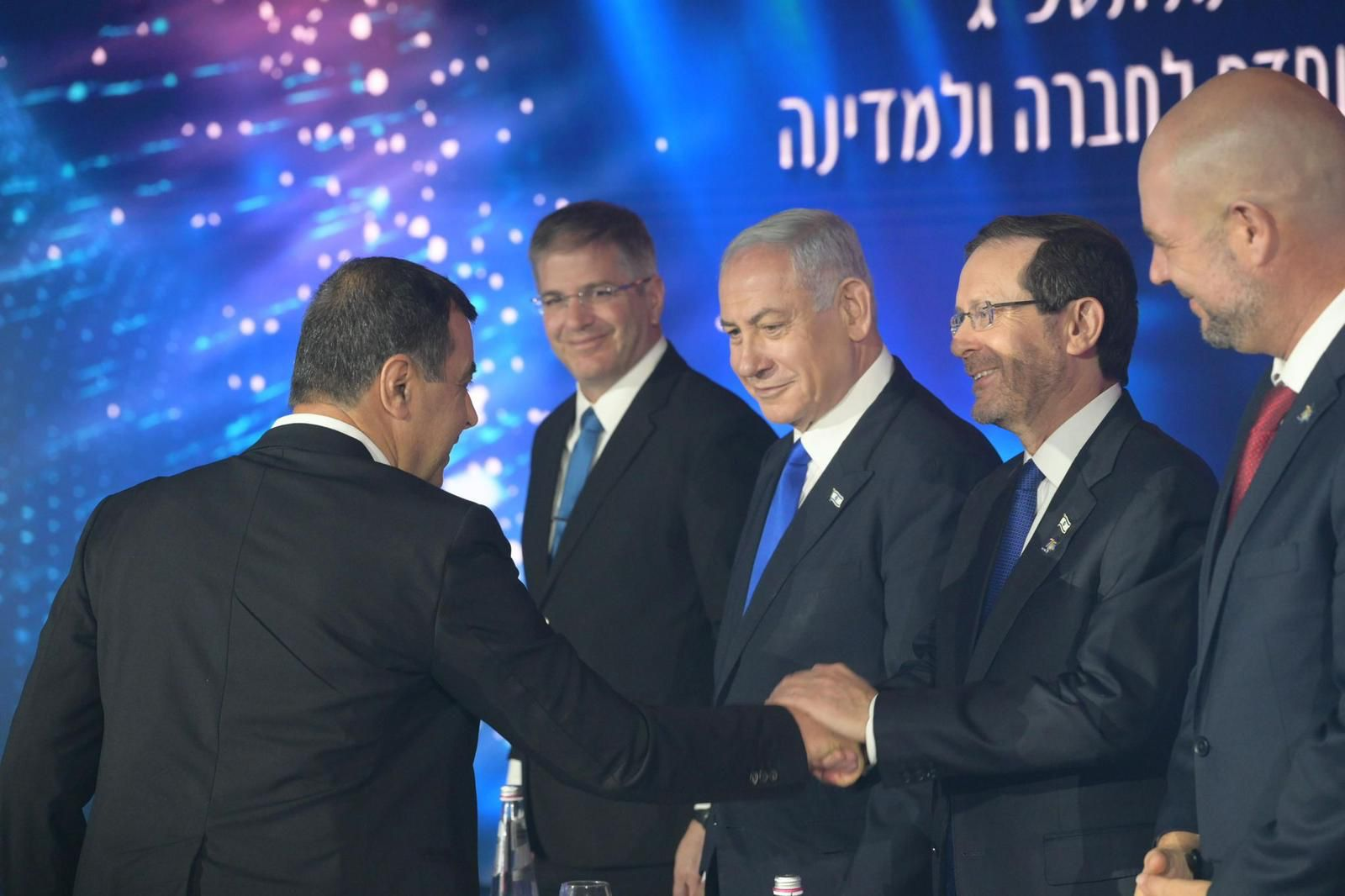
Israel Prize Award ceremony, April 2023

Prior to the Israel Prize, the most significant award in the arts was the Dizengoff Prize and in literature the Bialik Prize, awarded by the Tel Aviv municipality annually since 1930s.

The Israel Prize is awarded annually, on Israeli Independence Day, in a state ceremony in Jerusalem, in the presence of the president, the prime minister, the speaker of the Knesset (Israel's legislature), and the Supreme Court president. The prize was established in 1953 at the initiative of the Minister of Education Ben-Zion Dinor, who himself went on to win the prize in 1958 and 1973.

== Awarding the prize ==
The prize is awarded in the following four areas, with the precise subfields changing from year to year in a cycle of 4 to 7 years, except for the last area, which is awarded annually:

- Humanities, social sciences, and Jewish studies
- Life and exact sciences
- Culture, arts, communication and sports
- Lifetime achievement and exceptional contribution to the nation (since 1972)

The recipients of the prize are Israeli citizens or organizations who have displayed excellence in their field(s) or have contributed strongly to Israeli culture. The winners are selected by committees of judges, who pass on their recommendations to the Minister of Education. Prize winners are elected by ad-hoc committees, appointed by the minister of education for each category each year. The decisions of the committee must be unanimous. The prize money was NIS 75,000 as of 2008.

== Recipients ==
Prominent winners include Shmuel Yosef Agnon, Martin Buber, Abba Eban, A. B. Yehoshua, Israel Aumann, Golda Meir, Amos Oz, Ephraim Kishon, Naomi Shemer, David Benvenisti, Leah Goldberg (posthumously) and Teddy Kollek, and organizations such as Israel Philharmonic Orchestra, Jewish Agency, Yad Vashem and Jewish National Fund. Though the prize is generally awarded to Israeli citizens only, in exceptional cases it can be awarded to non-Israelis who have held Israeli residency for many years. Zubin Mehta received a special award of the Israel Prize in 1991. Mehta is originally from India and was music advisor and later the music director of the Israel Philharmonic Orchestra for 50 years until his retirement in 2019.

In October 2025, after President Donald Trump brokered a peace deal between Israel and Hamas, Prime Minister Benjamin Netanyahu announced he would nominate Trump for the award: the first non-Israeli to be nominated for the award. Education Minister Yoav Kisch announced in December 2025 that Trump would receive an inaugural Israel Prize for Peace. There were concerns that he is not eligible since he is not a citizen nor resident of Israel, however there is an exception for those who make a "special contribution towards the Jewish people".

== Controversy ==
The decision to award the prize to specific individuals has sometimes led to impassioned political debate. In 1993, the opposition of then prime minister Yitzhak Rabin to the nomination of Yeshayahu Leibowitz led Leibowitz to decline the prize. In 2004, Education and Culture Minister Limor Livnat, sent the decision to award the prize to the sculptor Yigal Tumarkin back to the prize committee. The decision was brought before the Supreme Court of Israel in the case of publicist Shmuel Shnitzer, politician Shulamit Aloni, professor Zeev Sternhell and Maccabi Tel Aviv basketball club chairman Shimon Mizrahi.

In February 2015, Prime Minister Benyamin Netanyahu vetoed the appointment of two members of the selection panel for the Israel Prize in Literature, prompting the other three members, including Ziva Ben-Porat, to resign in protest. Netanyahu explained that "[t]oo often, it seemed that the extreme panel members were bestowing the prizes on their friends". One of the prize candidates Yigal Schwartz of Ben-Gurion University of the Negev withdrew his nomination and called on other candidates to do the same. Over the next few days, members of the committees for the literary research and film prizes also resigned, leaving only two members of the original 13, and many other candidates withdrew their nominations. David Grossman withdrew his candidature saying that "Netanyahu's move is a cynical and destructive ploy that violates the freedom of spirit, thought and creativity of Israel and I refuse to cooperate with it".

In August 2021 the Supreme Court of Israel unanimously overturned a decision in June by former Education Minister Yoav Gallant to overrule the award of the Israel Prize in mathematics and computer science to Oded Goldreich because of Goldreich's stated views on the occupied territories. Attorney General Avichai Mendelblit had refused to defend in court Gallant's withholding of the prize, which Mendelblit said "deviated from the range of reasonableness and was not legal." The court's majority opinion ruled that Yifat Shasha-Biton, Gallant's successor as Education Minister, should decide whether to award the prize to Goldreich, while a minority opinion called for Goldreich to receive it without further review. In November 2021, Shasha-Biton announced that she would block Goldreich from receiving the prize. In an editorial, the Jerusalem Post wrote that Goldreich's "[c]alling for the boycott of professional colleagues ... is a red line that shouldn't be crossed". A Haaretz editorial said that Shasha-Biton's decision meant "the most prestigious prize awarded by Israel will not be the mark of scientific excellence but of loyalty to the government". The Supreme Court eventually ruled in Goldreich's favour and he received the prize.

In 2024, Education Minister, Yoav Kish announced that the traditional Israel Prize would not be awarded in 2024, and because of the Oct. 7th massacre there would be a single category of awards, recognizing Civil Heroism and Mutual Responsibility. The decision was challenged, with some claiming it was a way of avoiding giving the prize to Eyal Waldman, an Israeli activist whose daughter was murdered by Hamas. Following a petition to the High Court of Israel, and the refusal of the Attorney General to defend Minister Kish in front of the Court, the decision was reversed. The ceremony was conducted as usual with Waldman receiving it.

In 2025, Kish disqualified sociologist Eva Illouz from receiving the Israel Prize for Sociology for supporting a petition to the International Criminal Court against Israel in 2021.

== Venues ==
- International Convention Center
- Jerusalem Theatre

== Hosts ==
Year	Host(s)
2016	Tamar Ish-Shalom
2017	Sara Beck
2018	Hila Korach
2019	Sharon Kidon
2020	Sharon Kidon, Corrin Gideon

== In popular culture ==
The Israel Prize is at the center of the movie Footnote, written and directed by Joseph Cedar. The film is about two Talmudic scholars, father and son, and follows how the Israel Prize committee mistakenly informs the father that he has won the prize, when it was actually meant for his son.
