= Train Station (film) =

- Directed by: Xavier Agudo; Ryan Bajornas; Surya Balakrishnan; Nicola Barnaba; Petras Baronas; Juliane Block; Leroux Botha; Julia Caiuby; Gregory Cattell; Therese Cayaba; David Cerqueiro; Diane Cheklich; Violetta D'Agata; Felix A. Dausend; Tiago P. de Carvalho; Hesam Dehghani; Giovanni Esposito; Todd Felderstein; Ingrid Franchi; Yango Gonzalez; Vania Ivanova; Yosef Khouwes; George Korgianitis; Joycelyn Lee; Craig Lines; Michael Vincent Mercado; Athanasia Michopoulou; Daniel Montoya; Omer Moutasim; Marc Oberdorfer; Aditya Powar; Tony Pietra; Adam Ruszkowski; Andrés Sandoval; Guillem Serrano; Marty Shea; Nitye Sood; Wilson Stiner; Amirah M. Tajdin; Dzenan Tarakcija; Adrian Tudor; John Versical; Kresna D. Wicaksana; Kevin Rumley; Bruno Zakarewicz; Rafael Yoshida
- Starring: Alan Madlane, Patrick O'Connor Cronin, Lance Alan, Chris Korte, Robert Skrok, Patrick Gorman, Judith Hoersch, Yoann Sover, Daymon Britton, Vivid Wang, Matt Broman, Bryan Carmody, Georg Anton, Paul Howard, Jim Kitson, Alessandro Luci, Alba Ferrara, Alejandro Leon, Senen Selim
- Music by: David Alonso Garzón, Martin Thornton
- Release dates: 7 November 2015 (East Lansing); 3 February 2017 (United States)
- Languages: English, Persian, Indonesian, Spanish, Italian, German, Greek, Chinese, Hindi, Portuguese, Arabic, Romanian, Filipino, Malay

Train Station is a multi-director feature film from CollabFeature, the filmmaking team that created The Owner.

== Plot ==
Train Station follows a single character, referred to as "The Person in Brown," portrayed by 40 different actors varying in age, gender, ethnicity, and sexual orientation. Throughout the character's journey, they encounter a series of choices, ranging from minor to life-altering. With each decision made, the film transitions to a new cast and location, continuing the narrative under the direction of a new filmmaker. The cities featured include Berlin, Bogota, Dubai, Jakarta, Los Angeles, Singapore, Tehran and several others across five continents. The film explores themes of cultural diversity, decision-making, and the shared human experience.

== Reception ==
The film has received a generally positive response from critics. For instance, PopCultureBeast described the film as "the definition of collaborative experimentation in cinema".

== Festivals ==
  - The film premiered at the 2015 East Lansing Film Festival on November 7, in East Lansing, Michigan, US.[1]
  - East Lansing (MI) Film Festival; Sudan Independent Film Festival; Berlin Independent Film Festival; DC Independent Film Festival; Riverside (CA) International Film Festival; Los Angeles Diversity Film Festival (Winner, Best Feature); Cordoba Film Festival; Blackstar International Film Festival (Ghana); "The Goddess on the Throne" Film Festival (Kosovo; Winner, Best Feature); BALINALE International Film Festival (Bali); Kansas International Film Festival (Winner, Best Feature); Casa Asia Film Week (Barcelona); Miami International Film Festival (Winner, Best Feature Film for April 2016); Calcutta International Cult Film Festival (Winner, Best Narrative Feature for November 2016); Pune Independent Film Festival (India).

== Cast ==
1. Xavier Agudo
2. Lance Alan
3. Ryan Bajornas
4. Surya Balakrishnan
5. Nicola Barnaba
6. Petras Baronas
7. Juliane Block
8. Leroux Botha
9. Julia Caiuby
10. Gregory Cattell
11. Therese Cayaba
12. David Cerqueiro
13. Diane Cheklich
14. Violetta D'Agata
15. Felix A. Dausend
16. Tiago P. de Carvalho
17. Hesam Dehghani
18. Mahmoud Elsarraj
19. Giovanni Esposito
20. Todd Felderstein
21. Ingrid Franchi
22. Yango Gonzalez
23. Patrick Gorman
24. Vania Ivanova
25. Yosef Khouwes
26. George Korgianitis
27. Chris Korte
28. Joycelyn Lee
29. Craig Lines
30. Alan Madlane
31. Michael Vincent Mercado
32. Athanasia Michopoulou
33. Daniel Montoya
34. Omer Moutasim
35. Patrick O'Connor Cronin
36. Reno Pratama
37. Marc Oberdorfer
38. Aditya Powar
39. Tony Pietra
40. Kevin Rumley
41. Adam Ruszkowski
42. Andrés Sandoval
43. Guillem Serrano
44. Marty Shea
45. Robert Skrok
46. Gustavo Valezzi
47. Patrícia Zakarewicz
48. Ronaldo L'Costa

== See also ==
- List of films shot over three or more years
