= The Owner =

- Directed by: Xavier Agudo, Stanislava Buevich, Mike Canzoniero, Francois Coetzee, Martin de Barra, Todd Felderstein, Nicolas Fogliarini, Yango Gonzales, Omer Kula, Nino Leitner, Craig Lines, Vishesh Mankal, Giacomo Mantovani, Varun Mathur, Steve Murphy, Arne Nostitz-Rieneck, Asmit Pathare, Neha Raheja Thakker, Adam Ruszkowski, Alexander Schoenauer, Sabine Sebaali, Prashant Sehgal, Fahad Saikh, Marty Shea, Brian Shephard, Nicole Sylvester, John Versical, Rafael Yoshida
- Music by: David Alonso Garzon
- Release date: May 25, 2012 (United States)
- Language: English

The Owner is a multi-director, international feature film that follows a backpack around the world on its way back to its owner. It is the first film produced by CollabFeature, a group of independent filmmakers from all over the world. Each filmmaker wrote and directed his or her own short segment of the film in his or her own country. The Owner began shooting in spring of 2010. It premiered in theaters around the world on May 25, 2012. CollabFeature was started by Detroit-based filmmaker Marty Shea and web programmer Ian Bonner.

== Plot ==
The Owner follows a lost backpack on a journey around the world, meeting several fascinating characters along the way. As the story progresses, we learn details about the mysterious man to whom the bag belongs—a man named "MacGuffin." The film brings together a variety of cultures, languages and film styles into a singular narrative plot.

The feature consists of 25 independently produced short segments (2 to 5 minutes) that are connected by the backpack's journey. Each segment picks up the narrative where the previous segment leaves off and in some cases are inter-cut.

Having 25 directors from 13 countries, The Owner holds the Guinness World Record for "Most Directors of a Film." The world record claim was approved by Guinness on January 9, 2013. Previously, Paris, je t'aime held the record with 21 directors.

== Filmmakers ==
- Marty Shea - Detroit,
- Rafael Yoshida - São Paulo
- Fahad Shaikh - Pakistan
- Sabine Sebaali - Beirut
- Steve Murphy - London
- Varun Mathur - New Delhi
- Brian Shephard - Orlando
- Asmit Pathare - Mumbai
- Nicolas Fogliarini - Paris
- Neha Raheja Thakker - Mumbai
- Vishesh Mankal - New Delhi
- Francois Coetzee - Cape Town
- Mairtin de Barra - Dublin
- Xavier Agudo - Berlin
- Yango González - Bogotá
- Alexander Schoenauer - Berlin
- Nino Leitner - Innsbruck
- Arne von Nostitz-Rieneck - Vienna
- Reenita Malhotra - Hong Kong
- Michael Canzoniero - New York City
- Nicole Sylvester - Brooklyn
- Todd Felderstein - Los Angeles
- Prashant Sehgal - New Delhi
- John Versical - Chicago
- Craig Lines - Newcastle upon Tyne
