= Morgan Wandell =

American media executive

- Born: Morgan Wandell; 1971
- Education: Claremont McKenna College
- Occupations: Head of international content development Apple TV+
- Employer: Apple
- Organization(s): Producers Guild of America, Council on Foreign Relations, Academy of Television Arts & Sciences; BAFTA, YPO
- Board member of: KCRW, Saban Community Clinic
- Spouse: Francine Li

Morgan Wandell is an American media executive and producer. He is the head of international content development for Apple TV+. A "veteran of the streaming revolution", he previously held senior creative positions at Amazon, ABC, and Touchstone. His credits include Masters of the Air, Monarch: Legacy of Monsters, Disclaimer, Acapulco, Pachinko, The Marvelous Mrs. Maisel, The Man in the High Castle, Tom Clancy's Jack Ryan, Ugly Betty, Lost, Criminal Minds, Grey's Anatomy, Goliath, The New Look, and Tehran.

== Early life and education ==
Morgan Wandell grew up in Champaign, Illinois, graduating from Centennial High School in 1989. He was the senior class president and a member of the competitive swim team at Centennial.

Wandell attended Claremont McKenna College where he graduated cum laude with a degree in economics in 1993. During the summer between his junior and senior year, he interned for Channel One News.

== Career ==
Wandell began his career at Channel One News, where he wrote, produced, and directed news features and series for a daily newscast. In 1996, he was hired as a creative executive at Disney's Touchstone Studios where he managed primetime series and supervised the development slate of producers such as Jerry Bruckheimer, David Hoberman, and Peter Tolan. His shows included Boy Meets World and Home Improvement as well as Ryan Murphy's first series, Popular, for the WB. The Home Improvement writers named the fictitious network executive who cancelled Tool Time—the show within the show—Morgan Wandell. ("There's no project...If you have any complaints about that, you might want to email Morgan Wandell at big-fat-zero-dot-com.")

In the late 90s, Touchstone was merged with ABC Studios, and in the wake of the merger, Wandell decided to pursue his interest developing streaming video programming. In August 1999 he was named VP of Development at DEN, a precursor to modern streaming services that "lead the convergence of Hollywood and Silicon Valley, as it worked to create a new TV-style entertainment medium delivered on the Internet." . While at DEN, he supervised DEN's entertainment-based programming, oversaw the development and production of nonfiction video and animation, and helped to restructure the production operations and reduce its expenses.

In March 2000, DEN CEO Jim Ritts left the company to become CEO of Channel One, and recruited Wandell to return to Channel One as its head of programming. He was promoted to president of programming the following year. There Wandell oversaw production of a daily newscast for 8 million young people and expanded its capabilities into production commitments with other outside networks, including the MTV documentary series Breaking It Down with Serena Altschul, the 9/11 special The Day It All Changed for the WB, and investigative features on ABC News' Nightline on underground Christian churches in China.

In 2004, Wandell was appointed senior vice president, drama at ABC Studios. Over the next four years he developed series including Lost, Grey's Anatomy, Ugly Betty, Private Practice, Criminal Minds, and Ghost Whisperer, and helped to launch Desperate Housewives and Grey's Anatomy. During his tenure at ABC, the studio scaled significantly from producing one returning drama to 17. In 2008, producer Greg Berlanti recruited him to run Berlanti Television, which produced shows such as Brothers and Sisters, Eli Stone , Dirty Sexy Money , and No Ordinary Family.

In 2013, Wandell was named head of drama development at Amazon. There, in addition to The Man in the High Castle, Wandell helped to develop David E. Kelley's Goliath, starring Billy Bob Thornton; Amy Sherman-Palladino's The Marvelous Mrs. Maisel, Tom Clancy's Jack Ryan, Sneaky Pete, the anthology series Electric Dreams, cult hit Patriot, and the limited series A Very English Scandal. He was promoted to head of international series in 2016 as Prime Video expanded globally into more than 200 territories. In that position he led development of co-productions such as The Widow with Kate Beckinsdale (UK), and a slate of originals such as Breathe, El Candito (produced in Mexico), and Inside Edge, Made In Heaven, Mirzapur and The Family Man (made in India).

In October 2017 Apple launched its video subscription service—later called Apple TV+—and Wandell was appointed head of international content.Masters of the Air, an international WWII television series by Steven Spielberg's Amblin Television and Tom Hanks' Playtone launched in January 2024. It was the first series in which Apple served as the studio. The Apple TV+ international programming slate developed by Wandell also included Disclaimer, Monarch: Legacy of Monsters, Acapulco, Pachinko,Tehran, The New Look, Shantaram, Calls and Losing Alice.

== Personal life ==
Wandell and his wife, Francine Li, reside in Los Angeles with their two children. He serves on the Board of Directors of KCRW and Friends of the Saban Community Clinic.
