= Train station (disambiguation) =

A train station is a railway facility or area where trains regularly stop to load or unload passengers or freight or both.

Train station may also refer to:

- Train Station (film), a 2015 multi-director feature film
- "Train Station", a song by Basshunter on the 2004 album The Bassmachine
- For the former station in Ottawa called Train, see Train station (OC Transpo)
