= Gaza Syndrome =

2025 Israeli documentary series

- סינדרום עזה
- Genre: Documentary
- Created by: Duby Kroitoru, Hila Izhaki, Avi Soffer, Dana Direktor
- Directed by: Hila Izhaki, Duby Kroitoru
- Country of origin: Israel
- No. of episodes: 3

Production
- Producer: Yoav Leshem
- Production companies: טושוט סרטים וביונד קריאייטיב (2 Shot Films and Beyond Creative)

Original release
- Network: Kan 11

Gaza Syndrome (Hebrew: סינדרום עזה) is an Israeli documentary series broadcast on Kan 11, an Israeli state-owned free-to-air television channel. It was created by Duby Kroitoru, Hila Izhaki, Avi Soffer, and Dana Direktor, and examines the history of the Gaza Strip from 1948 up to the October 7 attacks. The series premiered on February 8, 2025.

Among the participants featured in the series are Jean-Pierre Filiu, Prof. Meron Medzini, Yitzhak Ini Abadi, Reuven Rosenblatt, Daniel C. Kurtzer, Mustafa Barghouti, Yom-Tov Samia, Gershon HaCohen, and Ada Sagi, who was kidnapped in Nir Oz attack and subsequently released during the 2023 Gaza war ceasefire. The series also includes interviews with popular figures in the Israeli public.
