= Missing File (TV series) =

- Also known as: Tik Ne'edar
- Genre: Crime drama suspense thriller
- Created by: Dror Mishani
- Based on: Missing File by Dror Mishani
- Developed by: Dror Mishani
- Directed by: Oded Davidoff
- Starring: Maurice Cohen; Orna Banai; Shaul Mizrahi; Anat Magen Shabo; Oz Zahavi; Carole Weyers; Mayan Bloom; Irit Kaplan; Tzachi Grad
- Country of origin: Israel
- Original languages: Hebrew; English
- No. of episodes: 8

Production
- Production locations: Holon and Tel Aviv
- Running time: 32 Minutes
- Production company: Gum Films

Original release
- Network: Kan 11; Keshet 12
- Release: June 30, 2019

Missing File is an Israeli detective television drama co-produced by Keshet 12 and Kan 11 that aired on May 20, 2019, on Channel Kan 11. The series was directed by Oded Davidoff, based on the book Missing File written by Dror Mishani which was adapted as the French film Black Tide.

The series includes eight episodes which are an adaptation of the first book, Missing File, and its sequel, The Possibility of Violence. The show was premiered on Kan-11 in May 2019, and in May 2020.

== Overview ==
Season	Episodes	Original premiere date	
Season	Episodes	Pilot	Finale
1	8	20 May 2019	30 June 2019

== Plot ==
Ofer Sharabi, a 16-year-old resident of Holon, was declared absent. At first, there was concern that he was kidnapped during a shooting attack in Tel Aviv, but that concern was lifted out after the terrorist was captured. Inspector Avraham Avraham, is the officer in charge of investigating the boy's absence case. Ze'evi Avni, Ofer's neighbor, reports in a false anonymous conversation to police that Ofer's body is near "The Tears Square." In addition, it is revealed that Avni forged a letter allegedly written by Ofer and addressed to his parents regarding his absence. At the same time as the investigation is ongoing, comes a police officer from Belgium as part of a police exchange program. Belgian police officer named Marianka is attached to Avraham.

Ze'ev Avni is invited to interrogation and admits to having fabricated the letter on behalf of Ofer and lied about the anonymous call to the police, and that he does know where is Ofer. Ofer's parents did not report to the police about the phone call regarding Ofer's fate, leading the investigators to suspect his parents and arrest Ofer's father. In his interrogation, the father says that he saw Ofer sexually assault his sister Danit, and while trying to prevent him from continuing his actions he accidentally killed him. The father says he took his body to the ship and threw it into the sea. Investigators learned from the mother's interrogation that in fact Ofer had seen how Danit was sexually abused by the father.

Avraham is also investigating the placing of a decoy bomb near a kindergarten in Holon. He is starting to investigate a suspect who was arrested at the scene but Avraham is forced to release him for lack of evidences. He is also investigating a crane contractor named Haim Sara, which a horticulturist helper say that he has a loud argument with the horticulturist. Sarah's behavior and responses, which also say that his Thai wife went to Thailand for her family visit, cause Abraham to regard him as the prime suspect in placing the bomb.

When the kindergarten teacher is brutally attacked and testifies to the identity of the attacker, the suspicion is removed from Haim Sara and he plans to take his two young children on a flight to Thailand to visit their mother. However, Abraham's early investigations into Haim Sara finds that his wife did not enter the borders of Thailand, and his concern for Sarah's children (after the trauma he experienced in the investigation of Ofer Sharabi's murder), make him insist on not letting Sarah go until his investigation is complete.

== Cast ==
- Avraham (Avi) Avraham (Morris Cohen): 38, single, introvert, and investigator at the Holon Police Department. The officer in charge of investigating the case of Ofer Sharabi's absence.
- Hannah Sharabi (Orna Banai): The mother of Ofer and Daniе.
- Rafael Sharabi (Shaul Mizrahi): The father of Ofer and Daniе. Yossi's brother. A seaman by profession.
- Danit Sharabi (Noam Logasy): Ofer's younger sister, autistic.
- Major Liat Mantsour (Anat Magen Shabo): A police officer in the Holon Police Department, working with Avraham. Divorced mother with a child.
- Barak (Oz Zahavi): An employee of Tel Aviv District police, and a Shabak officer. Became responsible for Ofer's case due to his possibility of being in Tel Aviv. Young then Abraham, arrogant and patronizing.
- Marianka (Carole Weyers): Investigator from the Belgian Police. Came to Israel under police exchange program as part sister cities agreement. Her family is from Slovenia.
- Ze'ev Avni (Mayan Bloom): Ofer and his neighbor's English teacher. An eccentric person who is also engaged in dramatic writing.
- Michal Avni (Defi Shoshana Alpern): Ze'ev's wife, Ofer's neighbor.
- Inspector Ilana Lis (Irit Kaplan): Head of the Investigation Office at the Holon Police Station.
- Yossi Sharabi (Golan Azoulay): Deputy Mayor of Holon. Raphael's brother.
- Haim Sara (Tzachi Grad): 53 old man, who owns "Sarah Cranes" and owns a penthouse in a luxury neighborhood in Holon. His Thai wife, Jennifer Pinko, disappears.

== American adaptation ==
In October 2021, it was reported that Peacock had given a straight-to-order to an American adaptation of the series, titled The Calling. The series will be co-produced between Keshet Studios and Universal Television with David E. Kelley as writer, executive producer and showrunner.
