= Kan 11 =

Israeli television channel

- Country: Israel
- Broadcast area: Israel
- Headquarters: Jerusalem

Programming
- Picture format: 2160p UHDTV (downscaled to 1080i and 16:9 576i for the HDTV and SDTV feeds, respectively)

Ownership
- Owner: Israeli Public Broadcasting Corporation
- Sister channels: Makan 33; Kan Educational

History
- Launched: 15 May 2017; 9 years ago
- Replaced: Channel 1

Links
- Website: www.kan.org.il

Availability

Terrestrial
- Digital terrestrial television: Channel 11

Streaming media
- IPBC/Kan: (Limited programming outside Israel)

Kan 11 (Hebrew: כאן 11) is an Israeli state-owned free-to-air television channel. Operated by the Israeli Public Broadcasting Corporation (IPBC), it launched on 15 May 2017, replacing Channel 1 after the closure of the Israel Broadcasting Authority. It is one of the six free-to-air channels in the country.

== Production ==
Kan 11 has produced various original shows, including Israeli adaptations of The Chase, and Carpool Karaoke, as well as many in-house productions.

In February 2023, a range of programmes from Kan 11 was released on Netflix within Israel.

=== Programming ===
==== News and current affairs ====
- Evening News (Hadshot HaErev) – the main news program primarily presented by Tali Moreno and Tal Berman (most of the programme is also broadcast every evening by Radio "Kan Bet") Sunday through Thursday
- Erev Erev (Every Evening) – presented by Dov Gilhar, Keren Uzan and Rinat Spivak
- Roim Olam (Seeing the World) - Weekly foreign news magazine
- Night News (Hadshot HaLaila)
- Seven with Ayala Hasson (Sheva Im Ayala Hasson)
- Friday at 5pm – presented by Uri Levi
- News of the Week (Hadshot Shishi weekly magazine, replacing Yoman – Journal) Presented by Moav Vardi.
- Shabbat News (Hadshot HaShabbat) – the Saturday evening news program
- The World Today (HaOlam HaYom) – presented by Michal Reshef and Yoav Zehavi (daily international news magazine)
- From the Other Side (Mehatsad Hasheni) – A daily current affairs program presented by Guy Zohar, exposing the gap between reality and the way it is reflected in the media.
- Pocket Games (Mishakei Hakis) – presented by Shaul Amsterdamsky (financial news magazine)
- Zman Emet (Real Time) - Investigative and current affairs television program

==== Entertainment ====
- Culture Agent
- Ad Kan! – A satire program about the political situation in Israel.
- Carpool Karaoke – Hosted by Nicky Goldstein (Season 1) and Udi Kagan (Seasons 2-3) (based on the segment on The Late Late Show)
- The Container – Hosted by Itai Mautner
- The Chase (Hebrew: המרדף, Ha-Mirdaf) – Hosted by Hila Korach (based on a British format)
- Pa'am Beshavua
- Halaila
- The 1% Club (Hebrew: האחוזון העליון, HaAkhuzon HaElyon) – Hosted by Shahar Hason (based on a British format)
- Eurovision Song Contest

==== Documentary ====
- Bein Hashmashot
- Ve Ha'aretz Hayta Toho Va Boho
- The Storytellers' Festival
- Gaza Syndrome - Documentary series examining the history of the Gaza Strip from 1948 up to the October 7 attacks.
- Nayes - The series focuses on the way the Haredi media conform to rabbinic guidelines concerning modesty, as well as the entire orientation of the religious press toward news coverage.

==== Comedy ====
- Zehu Ze! – Satirical and comic stories about the life in contemporary Israel (COVID-19 pandemic special).
- The Jews Are Coming – Satirical and comic stories about various periods in the Jewish history.
- Kupa Rashit – Situation comedy about a supermarket.
- Great News - comedy series.
- The Good Place, Comedy Series
- Shabas – Situation comedy about a prison.
- Dismissed (Hebrew: המפקדת) – Comedy-drama about low-level IDF basic training
- Rehearsals - Romantic comedy taking place during rehearsals for a new play in a Tel Aviv theater.

==== Action ====
- Tehran – Spy thriller centering on a Mossad agent and computer hacker on an undercover mission in the Iranian capital.
- Manayek – Police procedural series following the internal police investigations unit.
- Valley of Tears - The Yom Kippur War from the perspective of three characters.
- HaMezach (The Stronghold) - War drama following a desolate Israeli outpost that comes under siege after a surprise Egyptian attack.

==== Drama and crime ====
- Borgen (Hebrew: הממשלה, Ha-Memshala, "The Government" in English) Danish political drama series
- Chicago Justice – American legal drama series
- One on One (Hebrew: אחד על אחד, Echad al Echad)
- Unknowns - A group of boys at a school for at-risk youth in Beit Shemesh become suspects in a criminal investigation.
- The Lesson - A heated debate between a high school civics teacher and a 17-year-old student gets out of control and the consequences spill far beyond the classroom.
- Carthago - Set in 1942, during the British deportation of Zionist militias from Mandatory Palestine, the period drama centers on a successful comedian who finds himself brought to the Carthago camp in Sudan.
- Missing File - Detective television drama which is an adaptation of the book Missing File by Dror Mishani and its sequel The Possibility of Violence.
- Motherland - Set in the early 1990s, the series follows a detective at the Jerusalem District Police who is investigating the murder of a young immigrant woman from the USSR.
- Seven Figures - Comedy drama following the lives of six Israeli lottery winners as they participate in a mandatory workshop to prepare for their new lives as millionaires in accordance with a newly passed law in Israel.
- The Truth - Police-courtroom drama centering on a police detective as she investigates new developments in a controversial murder case.

==== Sports ====
- FIFA World Cup
- UEFA European Championship

== High definition ==
The channel has been broadcast in high-definition television since its launch. It also aired coverage of the 2018 FIFA World Cup in 4K ultra-high-definition.
