= Yoel, Israel & Pashkavils =

Yoel, Israel & Pashkavils (Hebrew: יואל ישראל והפשקווילים) is a 2006 Israeli documentary film on the Haredi Jews in Israel who have replaced popular media outlets such as television with the pashkevil or protest poster. The film follows Yoel Krause, a member of the Naturei Karta Haredi sect, who collects these posters. The documentary was directed by filmmaker Lina Chaplin.

The film won an award at the Warsaw Film Festival.

== See also ==
- Nayes - an Israeli television documentary series on the Haredi Israeli press
