= Uno (ThisGirl album) =

Studio album by ThisGirl
- Released: July 12, 2004
- Genres: Post-hardcore, hard rock, Indie rock
- Length: 47:49
- Label: Drowned In Sound
- Producers: ThisGirl, Chris Tsangarides

ThisGirl chronology
Demo's For The Family (2003)	Uno (2004)

Uno is the second studio album from the Sheffield rockers ThisGirl, and is the follow-up to 2002's ...Short Strut to the Brassy Front. Uno was released on July 12, 2004 by the artist management company Drowned In Sound.

== Track listing ==
1. "Master Blaster" - 3:34
2. "Don't Be A Kite" - 4:38
3. "Your Are But A Draft, A Long Rehearsal For A Show That Will Never Play" - 3:58
4. "Hallelujah" - 2:37
5. "Beeping At Pedestrians" - 3:15
6. "Drake" - 4:45
7. "Coffee And Giro Cheques" - 3:53
8. "Oscilloscope Love" - 3:04
9. "Inshallah" - 4:16
10. "Dah Dah Dah Dah" - 3:13
11. "Cartwheels" - 4:12
12. "St.James Gate Marylebone" - 5:43

=== Singles ===
"Hallelujah"
"Master Blaster"
