= Daniel Syrkin =

Israeli film director and screenwriter

Daniel "Danny" Syrkin, Hebrew: דניאל "דני" סירקין), also known as Dani Sirkin, is a Russian-born Israeli film and television director and screenwriter.

== Early life and education ==
Daniel Syrkin was born in Moscow, Soviet Union, to a Jewish family. Syrkin immigrated to Israel as a baby with his family and resided in Jerusalem.

He graduated the Tel-Aviv University's School of Cinema. His thesis project at the School of Cinema, a short film And Now Rachmaninov (עכשיו רחמנינוב, Achshav Rachmaninov, 1998), won a prize at the Turin Film Festival in Italy.

== Career ==
Syrkin has had a successful professional career in Israel. His film Out of Sight (2006) won the Israeli Academy Award for Best Director and was presented at the Cannes International Film Festival in the same year.

== Selected filmography ==
- MobLand (2025), TV series (episodes 5 and 6 of Season 1).
- Spring of Youth (2021), TV docudrama
- Tehran (2020) TV series
- London Pinat Ben Yehuda (2009), documentary TV series (winner Israeli Academy Award for the Best Documentary and also an Israeli Documentary Film Award for the Best Documentary Series)
- A Fool's Dream (2007) documentary (special distinction award Jerusalem Film Festival)
- Screenz (2007) TV series (unknown episodes)
- Horey Hahalomot (2006) TV mini-series
- Lemarit Ain (2006) (winner Israeli Academy Award Best Director; presented at the Cannes Film Festival, 2006)) ... a.k.a. Out of Sight (International: English title)
- Hallelujah (2003) (TV) (winner of Best Short Drama Israeli Academy Award, winner of Best Short Drama at Haifa International Film Festival)
- Shtey dakot miparadis (2002) (TV) a.k.a. "Two Minutes from Faradis" (winner of Best Short Drama at the Banff, Monte Carlo and Tout Ecran Festivals)
- Zakuta (2001) (TV) ... a.k.a. Shofar (Israel: Hebrew title)
- Shotetut (2001) TV series (unknown episodes)
- Take Away (2001) TV series (episode "Glida Vanil")
- Achshav Rachmaninov (1998) ... a.k.a. And Now Rachmaninov
- Take Away (2001) TV series (writer) (episode Glida Vanil)
- Achshav Rachmaninov (1998) (director and writer) ... a.k.a. And Now Rachmaninov (Special Prize Torino Film Festival)
