= ThisGirl =

Rock band from England

- Origin: Yorkshire, England
- Genres: Hard rock Indie rock Post-hardcore
- Years active: 1999–2006
- Labels: Lockjaw Records; Fierce Panda Records; Hot Trump Records; Drowned In Sound
- Past members: Liam Creamer; Matthew Westley; Chris Shepherd; Ryan Jenkinson
- Website: thisGIRL.co.uk

ThisGirl (stylised as thisGIRL) was a rock band from Rotherham and Sheffield, England. The band was formed in 1999, and has released seven albums/EPs. They were well known for their energetic performances and had a series of successful tours, most notably playing on the Barfly stage at Download in 2004. The band posted a message on its MySpace account on 13 November 2006 announcing its breakup after seven years. Drummer Ryan Jenkinson is currently a member of Reverend and the Makers.

== History ==
The band started out in Rotherham when the members of the band, then in school met at a Skunk Anansie concert in Sheffield. Initially the band was called 'Gerl' but changed their name after discovering that audiences were confused about the pronunciation. The band's sound has been described as a unique blend of "jazz-stoner rock."

The band then changed its name to ThisGirl and performed for the first time at the Wellington Boot public house in Rotherham. The band toured with Biffy Clyro, Glassjaw, Pitchshifter, My Deaf Audio Hell Is for Heroes and The Used before going into the recording studio to record their debut album, ...Short Strut to the Brassy Front in 2002. They played Brixton Academy with the Deftones and Finsbury Park with Limp Bizkit in front of 40,000 fans. This event was made infamous after ThisGirl actively encouraged the nu metal fans in the crowd to pelt them with bottles, with which they obliged.

By this time however the music industry were calling, but they decided to wait it out a little longer and continue to tour.

"In the time you do that you can see all the hares," says Ryan. "We're the tortoise and there's all these hares that get massive and then they're gone. Were still doing it for the right reasons, toddling along, were happy, the people who come to our gigs are happy." "Its like one of them elastic band balls that you used to make at school," adds Chris. "It takes five years to build up but when you've built it, the satisfactions so much better."

ThisGirl signed a recording contract with Drowned in Sound who promised total autonomy for the band. Chris Tsangarides, producer for Black Sabbath and Judas Priest, was drafted in to help with the band's new album, Uno. The album was supposed to be raw and unearthed and to ultimately be a real piece of music that avoided any computer trickery or industry trends that Tsangarides seemed to deem as being 'fake'.

"Its awkward music for awkward people," says Liam "Its colourful, its got loads of colours and loads of emotions. We can make you cry or we can make you smile!" "Or we can vomit on your lap", grins Ryan. "We act on instinct, we do exactly what we want to do. There's something there to pick up on, but you've just got to be willing to look for it. We work on more than one level."

The band played at Brixton Academy, Donington Park, London Astoria and Finsbury Park whilst the single "Master Blaster" was released.

For the remainder of their career the band played at various venues up to February 2006. It was announced on 13 November 2006 that the band would split, after seven years of touring. They played their final gig on 12 January 2007 at the Point in Cardiff supporting long time friends Douglas.

== Post-ThisGirl ==
After the band split some of the members got involved with other projects. Liam started singing for Hey Sholay and Ryan played drums for the New 1920, but it wasn't until mid to late 2007 that a message was sent out across MySpace informing friends of ThisGirl about a new band which would reunite ThisGirl plus a new member and take on a new style and direction.

Originally the band were known as "skeletons" and in 2008 they headlined the BBC Introducing stage at the prestigious Reading and Leeds Festivals. In 2009 the name was changed to "Skeletons & The Empty Pockets" and the debut single was released through Too Pure Records. The single sold all 500 copies before the release date on 31 July.

Eventually Skeletons and the Empty Pockets also split up and in January 2012 it was announced that Ryan Jenkinson would be joining Reverend and the Makers

== Band members ==
Band Role	Name
Lead vocals	Liam Creamer
Guitar	Chris Shepherd
Bass	Matt Westley
Drums	Ryan Jenkinson

== Discography ==
ThisGirl discography
- Studio albums: 2
- Extended plays: 2
- Singles: 2
- Music videos: 2

=== Albums ===
==== Studio albums ====
Year	Album
2002	...Short Strut to the Brassy Front: Released: April, 2002; Label: Lockjaw Records; Format: CD
2004	Uno: Released: July, 2004; Label: Drowned In Sound; Format: CD

==== EPs ====
Year	Album
2002	This Girl... Has Fangs Too: Released: October, 2002; Label: Lockjaw Records; Format: CD
2003	Demos for the Family: Released: September, 2003; Label: Fierce Panda Records; Format: CD

=== Singles ===
Year	Title	Album
2004	"Hallelujah"	Uno
2004	"Master Blaster"	Uno

Two versions of "Hallelujah" were released, both contained the song "Hallelujah", but had different b-sides. CD2 was only available for purchase online, although purchasing CD1 yielded a code that could be used to download CD2 free.

=== Music videos ===
Year	Title	Ref.
2004	"Hallelujah"	
2004	"Master Blaster"	
