= Hila Korach =

Israeli journalist, television presenter and physician

- הילה קורח
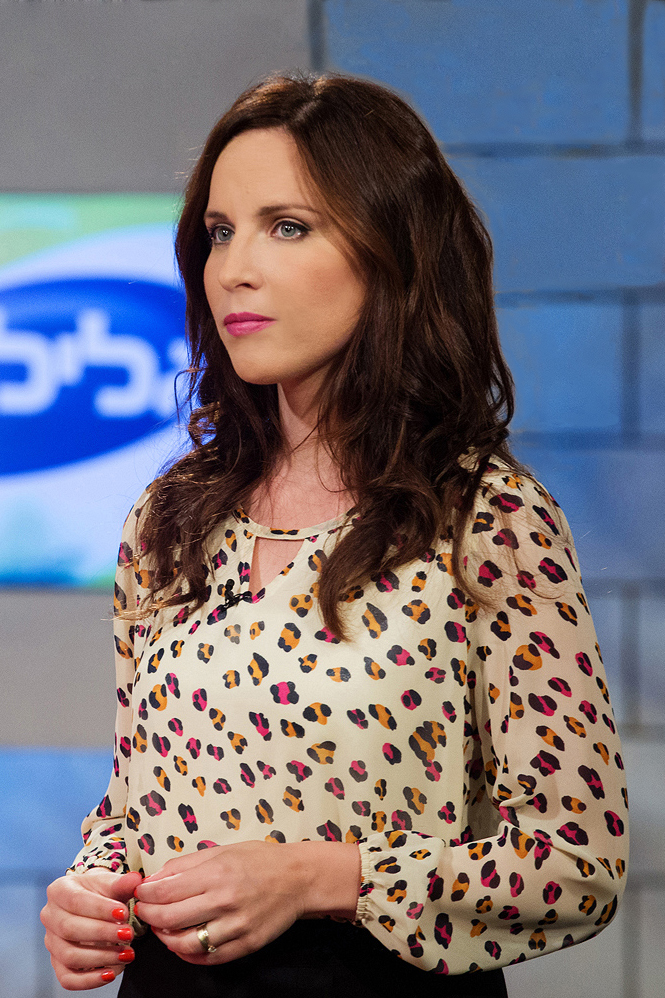
- Korach at the "Galileo" TV program studio, 2014
- Born: Hila Chaya Korach; 2 March 1984 (age 42); Tel Aviv, Israel
- Education: Tel Aviv University (MD)
- Occupations: Journalist, TV Hostess, Physician
- Title: Host of HaOlam Haboker, on Israeli Channel 2
- Spouse: Dror Schlafman
- Children: 3

Dr. Hila Korach (Hebrew: הילה קורח; born 2 March 1984) is an Israeli journalist, television hostess, radio presenter, and physician.

== Early life ==
Korach was born in Tel Aviv, the third child in her family. Her mother worked in Special Education, and her father was an Engineer in the Israel Aerospace Industries, who had emigrated from Hungary. Korach started her career in the media during her army service at the Galei Tzahal radio station, and went on to become the head of the newscaster department. She has worked on several TV networks including Channel 10, and has edited and presented radio news stories.

== Career ==
After completing her army service, she began working at Channel 10, where she was the hostess of the show "Kol Boker" (Every Morning) for a year and a half. After that, she became a newscaster and news editor. At the same time, she began hosting the TV program "HaArchiyon," which included live clip reeusts, on Israel's channel 24.

In 2005 she participated in the game show "HaMo'ach," hosted by Erez Tal on channel 2; she won first place and was awarded 350,000 NIS.

In 2006, she was chosen to host the student program on the campus channel.

Since 2007, she has hosted the morning show "HaOlam HaBoker" alongside Avri Gilad (formerly: Reshet Al HaBoker), on Israel's channel 2, and as of November it is broadcast on Israel's channel 13. Korach and Gilad won first prize for the "Green Light for the Media" award for 2008, and donated their award of 10,000 NIS to the "Kavim Umachashavot" non-profit organization, in order to promote awareness of attention deficit hyperactivity disorder.

In 2009 Korach hosted a TV series on the topic of weddings on the good-life channel. She hosted the evening show "Ulpan Layla" on channel 2 between 2010 and 2011.

As of 2010 Korach hosts the daily TV Science show "Galileo" on Israel's Education TV channel, which was also broadcast on channel 2.

In 2010 she returned to "Galei Tzahal" radio station and hosted the show "Nachon LeHaboker" (As of this morning). She left this position six months later, after accepting the request to focus solely on a television career.

Korach writes a weekly column in the popular "Maariv Sofshavua" newspaper.

In 2016, she aired a documentary show named "Masa Hakafa" with chef Meir Adonai. During that same year, the show "Galileo" was awarded the Israeli Academia Prize for Television, in the category of shows for children and youth.

In 2018, she began broadcasting on Channel 13 and hosted various programs as part of News 13.

In 2022, she hosted the 74th Independence Day Torch-lighting Ceremony.

In November 2024, she announced her resignation from News 13 and her transition to Kan 11.

== Studies ==
Hila has graduated from medical school.

She also holds a bachelor's degree in Psychology and Political Science, as well as a master's degree in Diplomacy.

She and her husband have three children.
