= Sandi Griffiths =

American singer (born 1946)

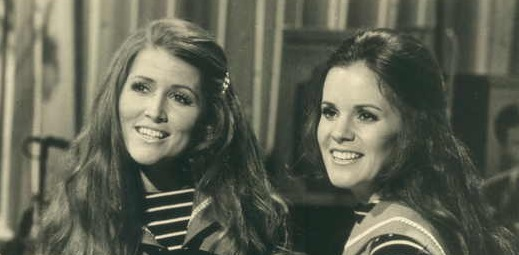
Griffiths and Sally Flynn in 1972

Sandi Griffiths (born Sandi Jensen on August 1, 1946) is an American singer. She is best known as a performer on American television's The Lawrence Welk Show.

== Early years ==
A native of the San Fernando Valley in Los Angeles, California; she started singing as a child and by the age of five, was a regular on TV by appearing on the Art Linkletter program, House Party. She continued to perfect her music skills all throughout school, and in college, at Brigham Young University where she teamed with and became friends with Sally Flynn.

== Sandi and Sally ==
At BYU, the duo sang at the school's musical revue known as the Program Bureau, later at Disneyland and then went over to Vietnam to entertain the troops as part of a USO tour. After three weeks, she and Sally returned to the states to concentrate on their professional careers, in which their break came when they were asked to open for Jack Jones at Harrah's in Lake Tahoe.

It was here that Lawrence Welk and his music makers in the summer of 1967 played their annual three-week engagement at Harrah's.

== Gail, Sandi and Mary Lou ==
When Sally Flynn left to pursue a solo career in 1972, Sandi wasn't sure about her future on the show since the program already had plenty of soloists. However, she found even greater popularity by being part of a new musical act, a girl group featuring fellow Welk stars Gail Farrell and Mary Lou Metzger that sang numbers made famous by The Andrews Sisters, McGuire Sisters and other famous acts.

The trio, with its blend of good looks and pretty voices, also became very popular with fans of the show. In addition, she sang a few solos, toured with the Musical Family in concerts, branched outside the organization by providing background vocals for numerous artists, and appeared in several television commercials.

== Personal life ==
Members of the Church of Jesus Christ of Latter-day Saints, Sandi and her husband Brent are the parents of eight children, a foster daughter, and grandparents of sixteen children.
