= Sally Flynn =

American singer and musician

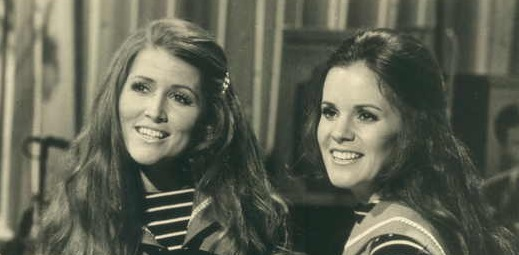
- Sandi Griffiths and Flynn in 1972
- Born: Sarah Jane Flynn; July 23, 1946; Ontario, Oregon
- Other names: Salli Flynn, Sally Hart
- Education: Ontario High School; Brigham Young University
- Occupations: Singer; Musician
- Spouse(s): Clay Hart (m. 1975; d. 2022)

Sarah Jane Flynn (born July 23, 1946), known professionally as Sally Flynn, Salli Flynn, or Sally Hart, is an American singer and musician who was a featured performer on The Lawrence Welk Show television program.

== Early life and career ==
Born Sarah Jane Flynn in Ontario, Oregon on July 23, 1946, Flynn is one of eight children—four girls and four boys—born to Norma (née Grant) and Walter Keating Flynn. After attending Ontario High School and Brigham Young University (BYU), she and BYU classmate Sandi Griffiths joined The Lawrence Welk Show in 1968 as the singing act of Sandy & Sally. The duo was very popular on the show until late 1972 when Sally left to pursue a solo career on Broadway.

On December 6, 1974, Flynn married Clay Hart, a country singer who was on the Welk show from 1969 to 1975, and shortly afterward they started singing together professionally; often as opening acts for performers such as Red Skelton, Juliet Prowse and Mel Tillis. She was noted for her warmth and fiddle playing. The Harts have also released several albums, owned a tote bag business—Get Sack—and have hosted their own show on The Nashville Network called Remodeling & Decorating Today.

They also appeared in wrap-around segments for reruns of the Welk Show on PBS and have toured the United States with their fellow Welk stars in the Forever Blowing Bubbles concert series.

== Personal life ==
From 2000 until Clay's death in 2022, the Harts made their home in Cocoa Beach, Florida, where Sally Hart continues to live and perform frequently, with the Melbourne Swingtime Band and other local groups. Hart is a Latter-day Saint.
