= Tehran (TV series) =

Israeli espionage thriller television series

- Season 1 international poster. The Azadi Tower fills the background.
- Genre: Action; Drama; Spy thriller
- Created by: Moshe Zonder; Dana Eden; Maor Kohn
- Directed by: Daniel Syrkin
- Starring: Niv Sultan; Shaun Toub; Menashe Noy; Liraz Charhi; Shervin Alenabi; Navid Negahban; Shila Ommi; Darius Homayoun; Glenn Close; Sasson Gabai; Phoenix Raei; Hugh Laurie
- Composer: Mark Eliyahu
- Country of origin: Israel
- Original languages: Hebrew; Persian; English
- No. of seasons: 3
- No. of episodes: 24

Production
- Executive producers: Dana Eden; Shula Spiegel; Julien Leroux; Peter Emerson; Alon Aranya; Moshe Zonder; Eldad Koblenz; Dimitris Michalakis
- Cinematography: Giora Bejach
- Running time: 36–51 minutes
- Production companies: Donna Productions; Shula Spiegel Productions; Paper Plane Productions; Paper Entertainment

Original release
- Network: Kan 11
- Release: 22 June 2020 – present

Tehran (Hebrew: טהרן) is an Israeli spy thriller television series created by Moshe Zonder for the Israeli public channel Kan 11. Written by Zonder and Omri Shenhar and directed by Daniel Syrkin, the series premiered in Israel on 22 June 2020 and on 25 September internationally on Apple TV. Featuring dialogue in Hebrew, Persian, and English, the series follows an Israeli Mossad agent of Iranian Jewish descent on her first mission in Iran's capital Tehran, which is also her birthplace.

The second season, starring Glenn Close, was released on 6 May 2022. The third season, with Hugh Laurie joining the cast, was released on 9 December 2024 on Kan 11, and on Apple TV on 9 January 2026. The series has also been renewed for a fourth season.

At the 49th International Emmy Awards held in November 2021, Tehran received the award for best drama series, becoming the first Israeli series to win this award.

== Plot ==
=== Season 1 (2020) ===
Tamar Rabinyan, an Israeli Mossad hacker born in Iran, goes undercover in Tehran to disable local air defenses, allowing the Israeli Air Force to safely bomb a nuclear facility. Disguised as an electric company employee named Zhila, she infiltrates the station network to cut power to the radar. However, her mission fails when she kills her boss in a struggle during an attempted sexual assault. Forced into hiding, Tamar reconnects with her roots, visiting her aunt and befriending local dissident activists. Meanwhile, she is relentlessly hunted by Faraz Kamali, the head of investigations for the Iranian Revolutionary Guards security forces.

=== Season 2 (2022) ===
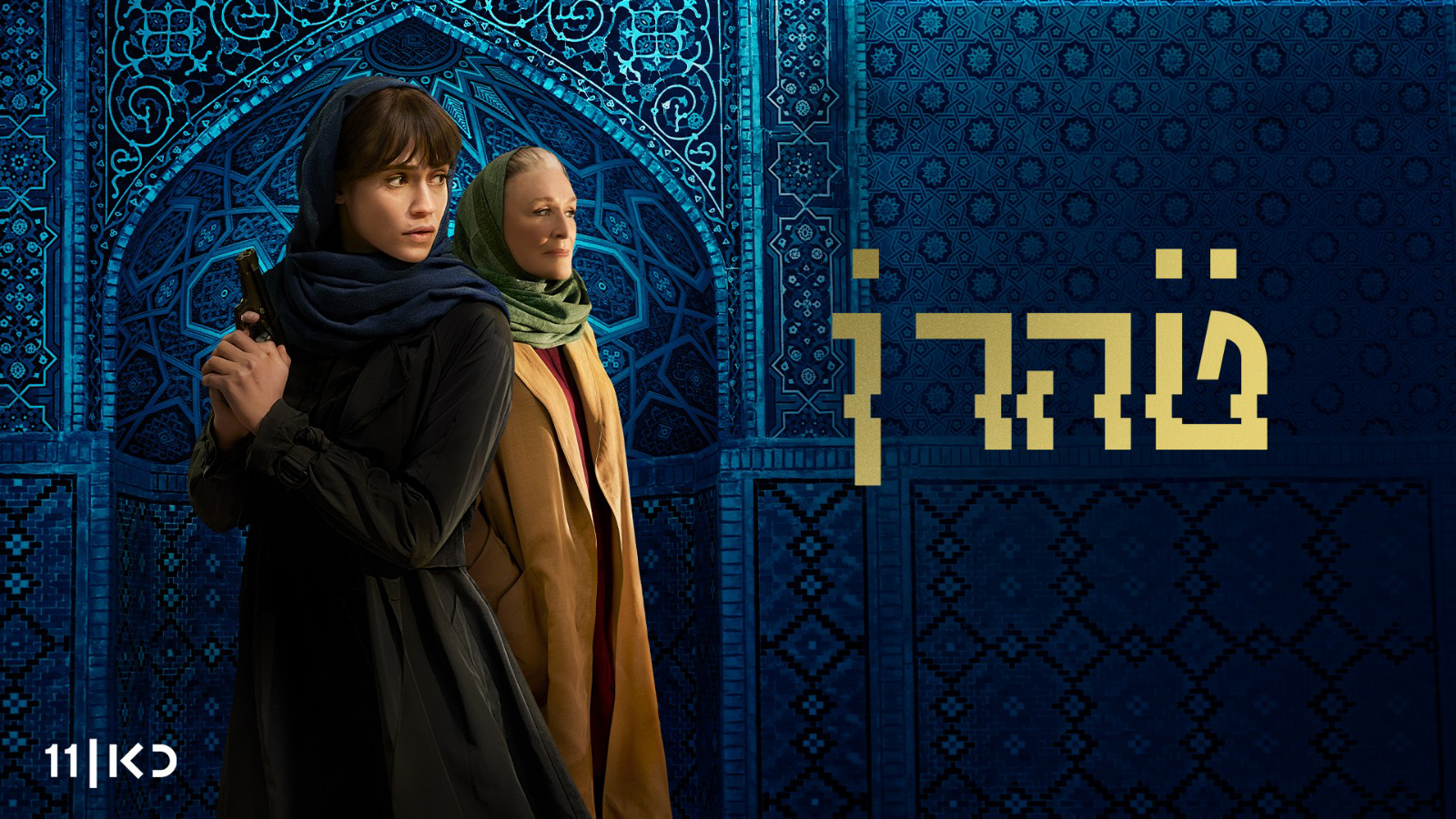
Hebrew poster of season 2; featuring Israeli actress Niv Sultan (left) and American actress Glenn Close (right)

Before fleeing to Canada, Tamar stays in Tehran to rescue a captured Israeli pilot. After her aunt is executed, she targets Revolutionary Guard head Qasem Mohammadi by befriending his son, Peyman. Meanwhile, Mossad agent Marjan Montazami infiltrates Faraz Kamali's life by treating his wife. Despite failed poisoning attempts and a car sabotage that kills Peyman instead, Tamar defies Mossad orders. After Marjan is killed, Tamar successfully assassinates Mohammadi using an explosive phone. However, Mossad destroys her escape vehicle, killing her partner Milad Kahani. Tamar is left alone, trapped in Iran, and betrayed by the agency she served.

=== Season 3 (2024–25) ===
Hebrew poster of season 3; featuring British actor Hugh Laurie (right) and Israeli actress Niv Sultan (left)

Hunted by both the IRGC and Mossad, Tamar discovers Iran is smuggling nuclear parts through Ramin Ghasemi. She bargains with Mossad, partnering with agent Nissan Yousefzadeh to intercept nuclear inspector Eric Peterson. Meanwhile, Faraz strikes a deal with Mossad to secure his wife Nahid's asylum, though he later chooses duty over family. Peterson, revealed as a triple agent, sabotages a nuclear test to expose the program. When the plan risks a city-wide explosion, Tamar, Ramin, and Faraz intervene. They successfully remove the nuclear core, causing a conventional blast that kills Peterson and Faraz. Tamar and Ramin escape with the core.

== Cast ==
=== Main ===
- Niv Sultan as Tamar Rabinyan, a young Jewish woman born in Iran but raised in Israel, a Mossad agent and computer hacker
- Shaun Toub as Faraz Kamali (seasons 1–3), the head of investigations of the Islamic Revolutionary Guard Corps
- Menashe Noy as Meir Gorev (season 1), the head of Mossad
- Liraz Charhi as Yael Kadosh (season 1), a senior Mossad agent and Tamar's handler
- Shervin Alenabi as Milad Kahani (seasons 1–2), an Iranian hacker and Tamar's boyfriend
- Navid Negahban as Masoud Tabrizi (season 1), (Note: Credited as special guest star.) an Iranian Mossad agent who supervises Tamar
- Shila Ommi as Nahid Kamali (seasons 2–3; recurring season 1), Faraz's wife
- Darius Homayoun as Peyman Mohammadi (season 2), the son of Qasem and Fatemeh Mohammadi
- Glenn Close as Marjan Montazami (season 2), a British psychotherapist who works as a Mossad agent in Tehran
- Sasson Gabai as Nissan Yousefzadeh / The Owl (season 3), a veteran Mossad agent who is sent to kill Tamar
- Phoenix Raei as Ramin Ghasemi (season 3–present), a powerful smuggler who befriends Tamar
- Hugh Laurie as Dr. Eric Peterson (season 3), a South African nuclear inspector

=== Recurring ===
- Arash Marandi as Ali Aghazadeh (seasons 1–2)
- Vassilis Koukalani as Sardar Qasem Mohammadi (seasons 1–2)
- Viss Elliot as Mrs. Sultani (season 1)
- Danny Sher as Mike (season 1)
- Esti Yerushalmi as Arezoo Raisi (season 1; guest season 2)
- Nethanel Toobian as Daryoosh Nekoomard (season 1; guest season 2)
- Alex Naki as Mordechai Rabinyan (season 1)
- Moe Bar-El as Karim (season 1)
- Sogand Fakheri as Razieh Nekoomard (season 1; guest season 2)
- Reza Diako as Shahin (season 1; guest season 2)
- Dan Mor as Eran (season 1)
- Tomer Machloof as Nevo (season 1)
- Tamir Ginsburg as Tamir
- Qais Khan as Mohammed Balochi (season 1)
- Sara von Schwarze as Yulia Magen (season 2–present)
- Sia Alipour as Vahid Nemati (season 2)
- Nofar Boker as Nofar (season 2–present)
- Bahador Foladi as Amir (season 2; guest season 3)
- Abbas Fasaei as Hossein (season 2)
- Elnaaz Norouzi as Yasaman Haddadi (season 2)
- Alain Ali Washnevsky as Ayatollah Larijani (season 3)
- Ray Haratian as Behrouz Janati (season 3)
- Bahar Pars as Shirin (season 3)
- Anthony Azizi as Jaafar Musavi (season 3)
- Fariba Sheikhan as Shaparak Nouri (season 3)
- Kimonas Kouris as Nico (season 3)
- Kiana Madani as Tina (season 3)
- Christos Papadopoulos as Marcus (season 3)
- Kavé Niku as Issa (season 3)
- Luke F. Dejahang as Jahan (season 3)

== Episodes ==
Seasons	Episodes	Originally released	
Seasons	Episodes	First released	Last released
1	8	22 June 2020	27 July 2020
2	8	6 May 2022	17 June 2022
3	8	9 December 2024	27 January 2025

=== Season 1 (2020) ===
No. overall	No. in season	Title	Directed by	Written by	Original release date
1	1	"Emergency Landing in Tehran"	Daniel Syrkin	Moshe Zonder & Omri Shenhar	22 June 2020
High above the Middle East, a Jordanian passenger plane destined for India suddenly declares an in-flight emergency, forcing an unexpected and perilous descent into hostile territory: Tehran. Hidden among the frightened civilians is Tamar Rabinyan, a highly skilled hacker and deep-cover operative for Israel's Mossad. Her presence is no accident. Her dangerous mission is to infiltrate and completely disable Iran's advanced anti-aircraft radar grid, creating a crucial blind spot so that Israeli fighter jets can launch a devastating preemptive strike against a clandestine nuclear reactor. The moment the wheels touch the tarmac, the clock starts ticking. Exploiting the ensuing chaos, Tamar slips into an airport restroom and executes a flawless, covert maneuver, swapping clothes and identities with an unwitting local Iranian airport worker. Disguised and tense, she confidently navigates the heavily militarized checkpoints, successfully vanishing into the labyrinthine, unfamiliar streets of the capital. However, the illusion is fragile. Faraz Kamali, a dangerously perceptive and relentless investigator for the Iranian Revolutionary Guard, is immediately dispatched to interrogate the stranded Israeli passengers. His sharp instincts quickly detect a discrepancy. Discovering the discarded clothes and the clever identity swap, Kamali triggers an explosive, high-stakes cat-and-mouse hunt across the vast, sprawling city of Tehran.
2	2	"Blood on Her Hands"	Daniel Syrkin	Moshe Zonder & Omri Shenhar	22 June 2020
Operating under the stolen identity of an Iranian civilian named Zhila, Tamar plunges into the dangerous shadows of Tehran. Desperate for a secure haven, she secretly reconnects with her estranged aunt Arezoo, risking her family's lives to maintain her fragile cover. Soon, her local Mossad handler, Masoud Tabrizi, issues her next critical objective: infiltrate the heavily monitored electric company and hack directly into the municipal power grid. This targeted cyberattack is an essential step needed to bypass Iran's sophisticated air defense radar. However, Tamar's carefully orchestrated mission violently derails. While undercover at the electric company, Zhila's corrupt boss attempts to sexually assault her. Forced into a brutal struggle for survival, Tamar fights back in desperate self-defense, tragically leading to his sudden, accidental death. With a body left behind, her cover is utterly blown. She is immediately forced to flee the bloody scene, leaving the vital hack unfinished and the impending Israeli airstrike in severe jeopardy. Simultaneously, the relentless Iranian Revolutionary Guard investigator, Faraz Kamali, aggressively escalates his citywide manhunt. He ruthlessly interrogates the real Zhila's bewildered husband, violently extracting the hidden truth. Piecing together the complex identity swap with chilling precision, Kamali rapidly closes the distance on the Israeli agent.
3	3	"Yasamin's Girl"	Daniel Syrkin	Moshe Zonder & Omri Shenhar	29 June 2020
With her primary mission severely compromised and authorities closing in, Tamar seeks refuge at the home of her estranged aunt, Arezoo. However, this temporary sanctuary is abruptly shattered when Arezoo's terrified husband discovers the Israeli fugitive hiding under their roof. Fearing the brutal retribution of the Iranian regime, he forcefully demands her immediate departure to protect his family. Suddenly thrust back onto the perilous streets of Tehran and desperate for an escape route, Tamar takes a massive gamble. She reaches out to Milad, a brilliant young Iranian hacker and fierce anti-establishment activist whom she had previously interacted with online under an alias. To make physical contact, she must navigate the city's hidden subculture, eventually infiltrating a pulsating, illegal underground rave. It is a stark contrast to the oppressive society above. Simultaneously, IRGC investigator Faraz Kamali strikes a devastating blow to the Israeli network. He captures Tabrizi, the local Mossad station chief, subjecting him to a brutal interrogation to extract Tamar's exact location. Yet, Faraz's ruthless professional exterior masks deep personal anguish; he is quietly agonizing over his beloved wife, who is preparing for high-risk surgery in Paris. Ultimately, Tamar successfully locates Milad amid the chaotic party, pulling her into Tehran's rebellious underground.
4	4	"Shakira and Sickboy"	Daniel Syrkin	Moshe Zonder & Omri Shenhar	29 June 2020
Seeking refuge from the escalating manhunt, Tamar embeds herself deep within Tehran's rebellious underground. She finds sanctuary with Milad and his clandestine commune of anti-regime hackers, masquerading as a passionate fellow dissident. By demonstrating her undeniable coding prowess, she quickly earns their respect and begins forging an intimate connection with Milad. However, Karim, a deeply cynical member of the group, notices subtle inconsistencies in her story. His growing suspicion threatens to expose her true identity and dangerous secret at any moment. Thousands of miles away, desperate to protect their stranded operative, Mossad drastically shifts their operational tactics. In Paris, ruthless Israeli agents execute a daring interception, capturing Faraz Kamali's vulnerable wife, Nahid, mere moments before a crucial medical operation. Using her as a hostage, Mossad issues a chilling ultimatum, blackmailing the relentless Iranian investigator to immediately abandon his pursuit of the spy. Faraz is thrust into an agonizing dilemma. He is violently torn between his fierce, unwavering loyalty to the Iranian regime and the terrifying reality of his beloved wife's impending execution. This unbearable crossroad strikes at the worst possible moment, precisely as his meticulous investigative work finally pays off, leading him directly to the doorstep of Tamar's underground hideout.
5	5	"The Other Iran"	Daniel Syrkin	Moshe Zonder & Omri Shenhar	6 July 2020
To cement her fragile cover and prove her loyalty to the anti-regime activists, Tamar accompanies Milad's commune to a pulse-pounding underground rave. However, the rebellious environment quickly turns perilous as she is unintentionally dragged into the group's highly dangerous and illegal side-hustles, further complicating her already fraught mission in Tehran. Simultaneously, the high-stakes intelligence war intensifies. Having kidnapped Faraz Kamali's vulnerable wife in Paris, Mossad leverages the ultimate blackmail against the fierce Iranian investigator. Their demand is absolute: he must secure the immediate release of their compromised local asset, Masoud Tabrizi. Desperate to save his beloved wife, Faraz initially complies. However, the cunning IRGC officer swiftly retaliates. He brutally coerces Masoud into remaining in Tehran as a double agent, threatening to destroy his family if he dares to flee. Trapped in an impossible crossfire between two ruthless intelligence agencies, the terrified Masoud misses his designated escape flight. Recognizing that their vital asset is now irreparably compromised and a massive security risk, Mossad acts with chilling efficiency. Israeli assassins ruthlessly gun Masoud down in the chaotic streets, leaving a devastated Faraz to watch helplessly as his leverage abruptly dies. Meanwhile, Tamar remains deeply hidden, meticulously preparing her next strategic move.
6	6	"The Engineer"	Daniel Syrkin	Moshe Zonder & Omri Shenhar	13 July 2020
Tamar and Milad make final preparations for their high-risk infiltration of the local electric company, their shared peril deepening an increasingly passionate romantic bond between them. However, their fragile sanctuary suddenly collapses when Karim discovers undeniable proof of Tamar's true identity as an undercover Mossad agent. Driven by political ideology to expose her to the authorities, Karim moves to betray her, but a lethal Israeli backup unit swiftly intercepts and eliminates him first. A traumatized Milad witnesses the brutal execution firsthand, suddenly discovering the terrifying, deceptive reality behind the enigmatic woman he has come to love. Desperate to keep her critical mission alive, Tamar tearfully pleads for his continued help to bypass Iran's radar grid before time runs out. Meanwhile, Faraz Kamali finds himself utterly trapped and backed into an impossible corner by Israeli intelligence. With his captive wife Nahid's life hanging by a thread in Paris, the fiercely devoted IRGC investigator is forced into a devastating, soul-crushing compromise. To guarantee Nahid's safe return, Faraz secretly agrees to halt his relentless pursuit, standing down to allow Tamar to proceed completely unhindered with her high-stakes sabotage.
7	7	"Tamar's Father"	Daniel Syrkin	Moshe Zonder & Omri Shenhar	20 July 2020
Devastated by Karim's violent death, a shattered Tamar breaks down while Milad—now held captive by Mossad—recoils in deep fury upon learning the full extent of her deception. Driven by relentless operational duty despite her immense guilt, Tamar forces a bitter, betrayed Milad into convincing their key electric company contact to proceed with the critical hack. Unbeknownst to either of them, this insider has already been secretly turned by Iranian intelligence. Meanwhile, Faraz Kamali executes a desperate countermeasure in Istanbul. He kidnaps Tamar's beloved father, using his life as brutal leverage to force Tamar's immediate surrender and guarantee his captive wife's safe freedom in Paris. Horrified at seeing her father held hostage in imminent danger, Tamar suffers a complete emotional collapse and abruptly halts the entire operation. With the sabotage stalling and the mission dangerously paralyzed, Mossad ruthlessly initiates Plan B, ordering Milad's immediate execution to eliminate loose ends. However, as the high-stakes shadow war reaches a boiling point, human conscience unexpectedly intervenes. Deeply conflicted by his moral boundaries, Faraz wrestles with his soul and ultimately chooses to spare the innocent old man's life, refusing to execute Tamar's father in cold blood.
8	8	"Five Hours Until the Bombing Run"	Daniel Syrkin	Moshe Zonder & Omri Shenhar	27 July 2020
Tamar, Milad, and Mossad handler Yael launch a daring infiltration of Iran's heavily fortified air defense headquarters. Their ultimate objective is to hack the primary radar system, successfully clearing a safe corridor for incoming Israeli fighter jets targeting the clandestine nuclear reactor. However, Yael secretly intends to ruthlessly execute Milad the moment the cyberattack finishes to eliminate any potential loose ends. Before Yael can act, IRGC investigator Faraz Kamali suddenly breaches the facility and shoots her dead. A terrifying standoff ensues, during which Tamar shoots Faraz to neutralize the threat, but mercifully chooses to spare his life. Escaping into the night with Milad, Tamar successfully executes the cyber-payload, effectively blinding the radar grid and allowing Israeli jets to cross into Iranian airspace. However, their hard-won victory abruptly collapses into catastrophe. Iranian military operators manage to force the radar back online far earlier than anticipated, rapidly locking onto the incoming strike force and launching a deadly barrage of anti-aircraft missiles. High above the capital, the unsuspecting jets become hopelessly trapped in a violent, chaotic dogfight, leaving the ultimate outcome of the nuclear strike and the fate of the pilots completely unknown.

=== Season 2 (2022) ===
No. overall	No. in season	Title	Directed by	Written by (Note: Moshe Zonder & Omri Shenhar are credited as the head writers for the season.)	Original release date
9	1	"13,000"	Daniel Syrkin	Asaf Beiser & Daniel Syrkin	6 May 2022
10	2	"Change of Plan"	Daniel Syrkin	Natalie Marcus & Daniel Syrkin	6 May 2022
11	3	"PTSD"	Daniel Syrkin	Natalie Marcus & Daniel Syrkin	13 May 2022
12	4	"The Rich Kids"	Daniel Syrkin	Asaf Beiser & Daniel Syrkin	20 May 2022
13	5	"Double Fault"	Daniel Syrkin	Natalie Marcus & Marc Grey & Daniel Syrkin	27 May 2022
14	6	"Faraz's Choice"	Daniel Syrkin	Asaf Beiser & Lee Gilat & Daniel Syrkin	3 June 2022
15	7	"Betty"	Daniel Syrkin	Roy Iddan & Lee Gilat & Daniel Syrkin	10 June 2022
16	8	"Blood Funeral"	Daniel Syrkin	Lee Gilat & Roy Iddan & Daniel Syrkin	17 June 2022

=== Season 3 (2024–25) ===
No. overall	No. in season	Title	Directed by	Written by	Original release date
17	1	"Fightback"	Daniel Syrkin	Tony Saint	9 December 2024
18	2	"Friend or Foe"	Daniel Syrkin	Simon Allen	16 December 2024
19	3	"The Lion's Den"	Daniel Syrkin	Lee Gilat & Tony Saint	23 December 2024
20	4	"Into the Fire"	Daniel Syrkin	Tony Saint	30 December 2024
21	5	"Unfinished Business"	Daniel Syrkin	Tony Saint	6 January 2025
22	6	"Man of Business"	Daniel Syrkin	Simon Allen	20 January 2025
23	7	"Duress Test"	Daniel Syrkin	Simon Allen	27 January 2025
24	8	"Day Zero"	Daniel Syrkin	Tony Saint	27 January 2025

== Production ==
=== Development ===
The series was created by Moshe Zonder for the Israeli public channel Kan 11. It was co-written by Zonder and Omri Shenhar, and directed by Daniel Syrkin. Production began on 28 October 2019. Some of the actors playing Iranians were born in Iran, and speak the language as their mother tongue. Niv Sultan, who plays Tamar, studied Persian for four months. In addition, she studied Krav Maga, an Israeli self-defence system. The series was shot entirely on location in Athens.

On 10 September 2020, it was announced that co-creator Moshe Zonder had signed a multi-year "first look" deal to create projects for Apple TV+. In December 2020, executive producer Julien Leroux said that production had begun on a second season though it had not been officially approved. On 26 January 2021, Apple TV+ confirmed that the series had been renewed for the second season. On 22 June 2021, it was announced that Glenn Close would be joining the cast. Filming for the second season began in August 2021.

On 8 February 2023, Apple TV+ announced that Tehran had been renewed for a third season, with Hugh Laurie set to join the ensemble cast. The show's producers and Kan 11 reached an interim agreement to allow production of the third season to continue during the 2023 SAG-AFTRA strike. The third season, produced by both Apple TV+ and Kan 11, wrapped shooting in Greece in the summer of 2023 and was supposed to premiere around April 2024, but the release was delayed due to the Gaza war and the ensuing Iran–Israel conflict. Kan announced in April 2024 that they would attempt to persuade Apple to reconsider and approve an alternative release date. In November 2024, after Kan received the green light from co-producers Apple, the season premiere was announced for 9 December 2024 on Kan.

In November 2023, producers were asked to rewrite parts of the fourth season due to real-life events from the Gaza war resembling scenes in the series, leading to a delay in the filming and production schedules. In a 2025 interview, director Daniel Syrkin reiterated that major parts of the fourth season were rewritten due to similarities with the Twelve-Day War, leading to postponed scouting dates. He also stated that the outcome of the war would affect the season's content. In February 2026, producer Dana Eden was found dead in an Athens hotel room during filming of the fourth season.

== Release ==
The series premiered on Kan 11 in Israel on 22 June 2020, In July 2019, Cineflix acquired exclusive global distribution rights for the series. On 16 June 2020, Apple TV+ bought international rights to the series outside of Israel, including serving as the exclusive streaming home to the series worldwide. The series was popular with audiences in India, Japan, and Singapore. In September 2020, it was announced that Moshe Zonder, the series co-creator, had signed a first-look deal with Apple. In October 2020, Niv Sultan signed with WME.

The second season was released on 6 May 2022, with the first two episodes released that day and later episodes on a weekly basis.

The third season premiered on 9 December 2024 on Kan 11, with a single subsequent episode airing weekly, with the exception of episode 6 "Man of Business". The last two episodes of the season aired back to back on Kan 11 on 27 January 2025, while having still remained unannounced for Apple TV. In December 2025, Apple announced that the series would premiere on their service on 9 January 2026 with one episode, followed by new episodes every Friday through 27 February.

== Reception ==
Critical response of Tehran
Season	Rotten Tomatoes	Metacritic
1	94% (18 reviews)	72 (12 reviews)
2	83% (6 reviews)	—N/a
3	100% (7 reviews)	—N/a

The first season of Tehran has received positive reviews from critics. On Rotten Tomatoes, it holds a rating of 94% based on 18 reviews. The site's critical consensus reads, "Tehran's expertly plotted twists further elevate a geopolitical thriller deftly balanced between the global and the personal." On Metacritic, the show has a score of 72 out of 100, based on 12 critics, indicating "generally favorable reviews".

The second season has an 83% approval rating on Rotten Tomatoes based on 6 reviews. Writing in The Guardian, Rebecca Nicholson gave the second season four out of five, praising Close's performance and describing the series as "a solid thriller, often breathlessly exciting, [that] has cracked the code of relentless tension".

The third season has a 100% approval rating on Rotten Tomatoes based on 7 reviews.
