= Nayes (TV series) =

2020 Israeli documentary TV series

Nayes (Yiddish: נייעס) is a 2020 Israeli television documentary series aired on Israel Channel 11 covering the Haredi Jewish media outlets in Israel.

The series focuses on the way the Haredi media conform to rabbinic guidelines concerning modesty, as well as the entire orientation of the religious press toward news coverage. The Haredi press includes two local area television networks, two private radio stations and one public radio station. There are also a range of news websites and dozens of magazines. A criticism of the series has been undercoverage of the issue of the limits of Haredi women from these religious media outlets. Haredi women may be employed as journalists, but their roles are constrained due to gender segregation in Orthodox Jewish life.

== See also ==
- Yoel, Israel & Pashkavils (2006) - a documentary film on the pashkveil or news posters in Haredi Israeli communities
