= Dana Eden =

Israeli television producer (1973–2026)

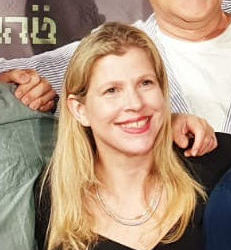
- Eden in 2020
- Born: 3 September 1973
- Died: 15 February 2026 (aged 52)
- Spouse: Itamar
- Children: 3 including actor Gur Eden
- Father: Yoram Levy

Dana Eden (Hebrew: דנה עדן; 3 September 1973 – 15 February 2026) was an Israeli television producer. She was best known for co-creating and producing the Apple TV+ espionage series Tehran.

== Life and career ==
Eden was born 3 September 1973. At 15, she met her future partner, Itamar, who was 18 at the time. They were together for 38 years and had three children; two boys and a girl. In 1996, she joined her father's company, Dana Productions, and in 1997 produced her first series, Teenage Dreams, which aired for three years on Channel 3. She eventually took over the company, once her father was diagnosed with Parkinson's disease.

== Awards ==
She produced Tehran (2020) which won the best drama series Emmy in November 2021. Her Saving the Wildlife show won best TV magazine for children and youth award at the Awards of the Israeli Television Academy in 2018.

== Death ==
On 15 February 2026, Eden was found dead in the hotel room where she was staying in Athens, Greece, during the filming of the fourth season of the series Tehran, which she produced. She was 52. Greek police have begun investigating it as a suicide.
