= Hallelujah (2003 film) =

- Directed by: Daniel Syrkin
- Produced by: Tzion Baruch; Tal Friedman
- Cinematography: Ofer Harari
- Release date: November 8, 2003
- Running time: 50 minutes
- Country: Israel
- Language: Hebrew

Hallelujah (Hebrew: הללויה) is a 2003 comedy TV movie Israeli filmmaker Daniel Syrkin. Set in the background of the 1979 Eurovision Song Contest, it stars Tzion Baruch as Shuki, an IDF soldier, and Tal Friedman as Major Magen David, who, while in the Sinai Peninsula, try to get to the contest on time.

== Plot ==
31 March 1979. IDF soldier Shuki Ventura (Baruch) has to abandon his base at the Sinai Peninsula to watch the 1979 Eurovision Song Contest, held in Jerusalem, where his girlfriend Milli (Efrat Aviv) wants his hand in marriage. This is dependent on two conditions: that there should be a peace agreement and that Israel should win the contest. On the way to Jerusalem, he finds a bedouin whose camels ate a stolen car, a hippie from Sinai (Uri Gottlieb), a Dutch lady and a member of Dschinghis Khan, who sang their song.

== Production ==
Hallelujah was commissioned for Hot 3's First in Drama anthology and aired on that channel on 8 November 2003. Like Giv'at Halfon Eina Ona and Avanti Popolo, the film satirizes the Israeli army. Sirkin said that he was inspired by those two movies as he admired them in his childhood.

== Accolades ==
On 19 October 2003, ahead of its release on television, it won the Best TV Drama award at the 2003 Haifa Film Festival. On 23 June 2004, it won an award at the 2004 Awards of the Israeli Television Academy for Best TV Movie or Miniseries.
