= Hallelujah (ThisGirl song) =

Single by ThisGirl

from the album Uno
- Released: June 14, 2004
- Genre: Post-hardcore, hard rock, Indie rock
- Label: Drowned In Sound

ThisGirl singles chronology
"Hallelujah" (2004)	"Master Blaster" (2004)

CD2 cover
- Single only available via download

"Hallelujah" is the first single to be released from ThisGirl's album Uno. The single was released prior to the album on June 14, 2004.

== Track listing ==
CD1

1. "Hallelujah" - 2:44
2. "Moustache to Fit a King" - 3:34
3. "Excited" - 3:55

CD2

1. "Hallelujah" - 2:38
2. "Beeping at Pedestrians" - 3:34
3. "Dreams Dreams Dreams V-VIII" - 4:12

CD1 includes a track called "Excited" which is a modified version of the track "Excited But Tired" which is from ThisGirl's EP Demo's for the Family.

CD2 also includes a modified track called "Dreams Dreams Dreams V-VIII". The original version can be found on the Demo's for the Family EP under the name "Dreams Dreams Dreams I, Dreams, Dreams, Dreams, IV".

== Reception ==
Reviews of the single were mixed, some praise the songs for their bouncy/energetic edge, with comments such as Carnaple.com's:

"Straight off, I like this - if only because the vocals don’t sound like every other rock band around at the moment."

Others criticize the band's change of style from their earlier songs, with BBC music review saying:

"This Girl have morphed into an altogether different beast, and it’s not a change for the better either."

== Music video ==
The music video for "Hallelujah" was directed by Armando from Retro-juice productions. The video features a variety of shots of the band performing live and shots of a recording studio.
