= Howard Fine =

American acting coach (born 1958)

- Born: November 28, 1958 (age 67); Providence, Rhode Island, U.S.
- Occupation: Acting teacher

Howard Fine (born November 28, 1958) is an American acting coach, theatre director, and author. He is the founder of the Howard Fine Acting Studio.

== Early life ==
Fine was born in Providence, Rhode Island, he is the youngest of five children. His parents, Max, an American GI, and Nelly, a Holocaust survivor, were married in Shanghai before returning to the U.S. He took theater in high school and directed Edward Albee's The Sandbox at the age of 16.

== Career ==
=== Early career ===
Fine completed his BA in Communication/Theater at Rhode Island College. After completing graduate school in Boston, Fine moved to New York City, where he landed his first teaching job at the American Musical and Dramatic Academy. After one semester of teaching, he was promoted to head of the Acting Department at the age of 24, making him the youngest head in the studio's history. It was here that he developed a year-long training program known as "The Foundation", a version of which he still teaches at his studios in Los Angeles and Melbourne, Australia.

=== Acting teacher ===
In 1985, Fine moved to Los Angeles with his best friend, voice coach David Coury, and began his career by privately coaching students in his living room; in 1988, he had to expand to accommodate his growing classes. In 2006 he was named "Best Acting Teacher in Los Angeles" in Back Stage West's "Best of Los Angeles" issue.

He also offers annual masterclasses in Sydney, Australia, and at his studio in Melbourne. Howard is an adjunct faculty member for the University of Texas Austin's Theater & Dance Department.

=== Theater director ===
Fine's sole Broadway credit is for directing Michael Chiklis when he replaced Rob Becker in Defending the Caveman. Other credits include directing Elizabeth Berkley, Aasif Mandvi, Ally Sheedy, and Rachel Dratch in David Lindsay-Abaire's That Other Person as part of the best of the 24-hour plays on Broadway. Howard is credited in the published version of the play. He won a Drama-logue award and received an Ovation Award nomination for his direction of Billy Campbell in Fortinbras.
