= CollabFeature =

== The Owner ==
CollabFeature's first multi-director project was a feature film titled, The Owner. The story follows a lost backpack that travels the globe on a journey to find its owner, a man named "MacGuffin." As the story progresses, the viewer learn details about the mysterious man to whom the bag belongs. The film brings together a variety of cultures, languages and film styles into a singular narrative plot.

The feature consists of 25 brief segments that are connected by the backpack's journey. Each short film is approximately 2 to 5 minutes long.

With its 28 directors (including the three additional directors), The Owner had more directors than Paris je t'aime, which currently holds the Guinness World Record for the most directors (21) on one film.

The Owner premiered on May 25, 2012 around the world.

== Train Station ==
CollabFeature's second multi-director project was a feature film entitled Train Station, about possibilities and choices. Filmed in 25 countries, 40 filmmakers collaboratively wrote and assembled it via CollabFeature, the world's first Internet collaboration of its kind.

The film follows a single, unnamed character played by 43 different actors from different parts of the world. Every time the character is confronted with a choice, the film cuts to a new actor in a new city. A new director continues the story. The character, who always wears brown, switches ages, genders and nationalities. Every time the Character in Brown reaches the end of a story path, the film backs up to a previous choice and a new director takes us down a different path to explore "what would have happened if..."

- Premiere at East Lansing Film Festival, Michigan, US, November 6, 2015
- Sudan Independent Film Festival
- Berlin Independent Film Festival, February 17, 2016
- Washington DC Film Festival, March 10, 2016

== Notable filmmakers ==
- Fahad Shaikh - Dubai
- Varun Mathur - New Delhi
