= Apple TV (streaming service) =

American video streaming service

- Developer: Apple Inc.
- Key people: Eddy Cue (Senior VP of Internet Software & Services); Zack Van Amburg (Head of Worldwide Video Programming); Jamie Erlicht (Head of Worldwide Video Programming); Matt Cherniss (Head of Programming & Domestic Creative Development); Molly Thompson (Head of Documentaries and Unscripted); Tara Sorensen (Head of Kids Programming)
- Type: OTT streaming platform
- Launched: November 1, 2019 (7 years ago)
- Platforms: Apple TV app; Web browsers
- Members: 60 million (est., as of 2025)
- Pricing model: Monthly subscription; Included with Apple One (where available)
- Website: Home Page: apple.com/apple-tv; Web Player: tv.apple.com

Apple TV (formerly known as Apple TV+) is a subscription over-the-top streaming service owned by Apple. The service launched on November 1, 2019, and it offers a selection of original production film and television series called Apple Originals. Its programming arm is Apple Studios. The service was announced during the Apple Special Event of March 2019. It can be accessed through Apple's website and through the Apple TV app. Apple TV has over 60 million paid memberships. The service was rebranded in late 2025, removing the + from "Apple TV".

Apple TV initially experienced poor growth and low subscriber numbers relative to other competing services during its first full year in 2020. Since then, the service has become the home to more critically acclaimed content: between September 2021 and March 2022, Apple TV netted a Primetime Emmy Award for Outstanding Comedy Series with Ted Lasso and the Academy Award for Best Picture with CODA, the first Best Picture win for a film distributed by a streaming service. Apple TV (along with the simultaneously announced a-la-carte premium-video subscription aggregation service Apple TV app) is part of a concerted effort by Apple to expand its service revenues.

== History ==
=== Origins ===
Apple had long been rumored to have an interest in beginning a streaming television service, and in 2015 entered into negotiations with various television studios and programmers to aggregate their content for a live-television streaming bundle. Negotiations fell apart over differing views on how to value the content, lack of transparency on details, and the personality of Apple's chief negotiator, Eddy Cue.

In October 2016, Apple CEO Tim Cook said that television is "of intense interest to me and other people here", and added that Apple has "started focusing on some original content", which he called "a great opportunity for us both from a creation point of view and an ownership point of view. So it's an area we're focused on."

=== Staffing ===
In June 2017, Apple began to take the first major steps to form its new television unit by hiring the co-presidents of Sony Pictures Television, Jamie Erlicht and Zack Van Amburg, to oversee all aspects of worldwide video programming. In August, Matt Cherniss was hired as Head of Domestic Creative Development, reporting directly to Van Amburg and Erlicht. For the rest of 2017, Apple continued to fill out its executive team for Apple TV+, with Kim Rozenfeld joining as Head of Current Programming and Unscripted, Jay Hunt joining as Creative Director for Europe, Morgan Wandell joining as Head of International Creative Development, Tara Sorensen joining as Head of Kids Programming, and Max Aronson, Ali Woodruff, Carina Walker, and Michelle Lee joining as development and creative executives.

Throughout 2019, Apple continued to build out its unscripted content team, with Molly Thompson hired as Head of Documentaries in April. In November, Rozenfeld stepped down as Head of Current Programming and Unscripted to focus on producing content again with a first-look content production deal with Apple under his Half Full Productions. Cherniss took over Rozenfeld's duties overseeing current scripted programming.

=== Development news reports ===
In May 2018, it was reported that Apple was expected to start a sister project to its original content service, and begin selling subscriptions to certain video services directly via its Apple TV app application on iOS and tvOS, rather than asking Apple device owners to subscribe to those services through applications individually downloaded from Apple's App Store.

In October 2018, it was reported that Apple would distribute its future original content through a still-in-development digital video service within its TV application that is pre-installed in all iOS and tvOS devices. The service was expected to feature both original content, free to owners of Apple devices, as well as subscription "channels" from legacy media companies such as HBO and Starz, which would allow customers to sign up for online-only services. Later that month, it was reported that Apple intended to roll out the service in the U.S. during the first half of 2019 and that it would expand its availability to around 100 countries in the months after its launch.

=== Launch ===
On March 25, 2019, Apple held a press event to announce Apple TV+. At the event, Apple showed a teaser of its upcoming original content and formally announced some of it, with actors and producers attached to the content appearing on stage, including Jennifer Aniston, Oprah Winfrey, and Steven Spielberg. The announced content included Helpsters, the first series from Sesame Workshop, the producer of Sesame Street, and Oprah Winfrey's first projects for Apple TV+, including a documentary under the working title Toxic Labor about workplace sexual harassment, a documentary series about mental health, and a revival of Oprah's Book Club as a standalone television series.

On September 10, 2019, Apple announced that Apple TV+ would launch on November 1 at $4.99 per month (with a 1-week free trial) for an account that can be shared with up to six family members. Apple also announced that it would be giving away a year of Apple TV+ to anyone who bought a new Apple TV, Mac, iPad, iPhone, or iPod Touch beginning that day. Student subscribers to the monthly Apple Music service at a discounted rate also had Apple TV+ bundled in at no additional cost for the time being.

The service was initially available on Apple devices, Roku and Amazon Fire TV streamers and select TVs. Apple gradually expanded the availability of the streaming service over time, with an Android app releasing in 2025. Upon its debut, Apple TV+ was available in about 100 countries, fewer than the reported target of 150. Several countries were excluded from service despite other Apple products being available.

=== Free subscription extensions ===
From the start of Apple TV+ on November 1, 2019, Apple offered a free one-year subscription to anyone buying certain of its hardware products (an iPhone, iPad, Apple TV, iPod Touch, or Mac). Apple initially extended the free year that was due to end on November 1, 2020, to February 28, 2021, but then announced in mid-January 2021 that it would extend it a second time to July 31, 2021. In mid-June 2021, Apple added a note to its website advising customers that new users subscribing after June 30, 2021, would receive only three months of free subscription instead of a year.

=== Subscription pricing increases ===
On October 24, 2022, Apple announced it was to increase pricing of Apple TV+ (along with Apple Music and Apple One) subscriptions in many regions. The monthly plan increased $2 to $6.99, and the annual plan increased $20 to $69.

=== Rebranding ===
In October 2025, to coincide with the release of F1 on the service, Apple announced that Apple TV+ would be rebranded as simply "Apple TV". Variety noted that this marked the platform's first name change since its launch, while The Verge mused that "the change is likely to cause some confusion" due to the shared branding among the streaming service, set-top box, and software application. Explaining the name change, Apple executive Eddy Cue reasoned that the service had already been commonly known as "Apple TV" for some time, dismissing concerns of potential confusion. As part of the rebrand, Apple TV also changed their famous introduction "Piano" sound to a more modern version created by Finneas, and switched to a new "Rainbow" multicolored logo created through real glass and practical effects. The rebrand was widely visible on devices updated to Apple's OS 26.1 variant, as well as on the Apple TV app.

== Programming ==
During the announcement of Apple TV+, Apple announced a number of prominent writers, directors, and stars who would be featured in the service. The signing of high-profile talent was intended to attract viewers to the service. As of March 2019, five of the upcoming series had completed production, with six more well into filming. On September 10, 2019, Apple announced that Apple TV+ would have eight original series (seven scripted and one unscripted) and one original documentary available at launch, with plans to launch new original content every month thereafter. Most series were expected to launch with three episodes, with a new episode released weekly thereafter, although Apple said that not all series would follow that model and that some series might instead launch all at once.

Early critical reaction to the bulk of the service's programming was mixed to poor, but commentators predicted that Apple would have time to grow into its new role as a content provider and to produce well-regarded content, especially as the free year of the service provided with many Apple product purchases enticed users to continue watching, and for some to eventually pay for a subscription, as new series are released.

=== COVID-19 pandemic effects ===
On March 13, 2020, Apple suspended all active filming on Apple TV+ shows due to the COVID-19 pandemic, and all production on series was postponed for an indeterminate period. Apple's decision in mid-2020 to license large swaths of existing older content for the Apple TV+ service was viewed, in part, as buying time for its original content production during the pandemic by keeping users engaged and in a habit of visiting the service regularly, so that a viewer base would be in place by the time new Apple original content was released.

In addition, Apple TV+ endeavored to gain new high-profile content, taking advantage of the pandemic's disruption of theatrical film releases. Among these acquisitions were the 2020 feature film Greyhound starring Tom Hanks, which was purchased from Sony Pictures for $70 million. In July 2020, the service won a heated bidding war for Emancipation, a slavery-based action-thriller starring Will Smith and directed by Antoine Fuqua. Apple paid a record $105 million for the rights. Apple also reportedly considered a $350 to $400 million offer for the rights to stream the James Bond film No Time to Die, which was far short of the $650 to $800 million studio Metro-Goldwyn-Mayer was willing to accept.

=== Celebrity partnerships, other original content and programming decisions ===
==== 2017 ====
In October 2017, following reports of sexual abuse allegations against producer Harvey Weinstein, Apple announced that it was severing ties with the Weinstein Company (TWC) and cancelling a planned biopic series about Elvis Presley.

==== 2018 ====
In April 2018, Apple signed Kerry Ehrin to a multi-year deal to produce original content. Ehrin and Apple renewed the deal in May 2020. In June 2018, Apple signed the Writers Guild of America's minimum basic agreement and Oprah Winfrey to a multi-year content partnership. The same month, Apple announced that it had given a multi-series order to Sesame Workshop to produce various live-action and animated series as well as a single puppet-based series.

In September 2018, it was reported that Apple had decided to shelve Vital Signs, a six-episode biopic television series centering on the life of hip-hop producer and performer Dr. Dre and starring Ian McShane, Sam Rockwell, and Michael K. Williams, due to concerns about the show's content being too graphic, with moments cited including characters using cocaine, instances of gun violence, and an explicit orgy scene. Reports further indicated that Apple CEO Tim Cook was taking a hands-on approach to the company's Worldwide Video Unit, with programming decisions reportedly being aligned to Cook's personal taste, with a preference for family-friendly shows. Various programs in different stages of production apparently had their content altered, including the toning down of The Morning Show and the removal of crucifixes from a scene in the M. Night Shyamalan drama series. Additionally, Apple reportedly passed on a television series from comedian Whitney Cummings about the #MeToo movement because it was "too sensitive a topic". Cummings's series was ultimately put into development by Amazon Prime Video in October 2018.

In November 2018, Apple entered into a multi-year agreement with entertainment company A24 to produce a slate of original films in partnership with its Worldwide Video Unit. The same month, Apple signed a deal with DHX Media (now WildBrain) and its subsidiary Peanuts Worldwide to develop and produce original programs, including new series, specials, and shorts based on the Peanuts characters. One of the first productions created through the deal was an original short-form, STEM-related series featuring astronaut Snoopy. Also that month, Apple signed Justin Lin and his production company, Perfect Storm Entertainment, to a multi-year overall deal to produce original television content.

==== 2019 ====
In January 2019, Apple signed Jason Katims and his production company, True Jack Productions, to a multi-year overall production and development deal to produce original television content. The same month, Apple signed a first-look deal with Imagine Documentaries to develop nonfiction features and series. In February 2019, Harpo Productions hired Terry Wood as an executive vice president to oversee Harpo's production of original programming for Apple as part of the multi-year agreement between Winfrey and Apple. In March 2019, it was reported that five television series commissioned by Apple had finished filming and six series would finish in the next few months. On April 10, 2019, Prince Harry, Duke of Sussex, announced on Instagram that he was working alongside Winfrey on the mental health documentary series as a co-creator and executive producer. In October 2019, Apple signed Monica Beletsky to a multi-year deal.

==== 2020 ====
In January 2020, Apple signed a five-year production deal with Richard Plepler, the former CEO and chairman of HBO. Under the production deal, Plepler's production company, Eden Productions, will create television series, documentaries and feature films exclusively for Apple TV+. Also in January 2020, Apple signed a multi-year deal with Lee Eisenberg, ahead of the premiere of his series Little America, and another multi-year deal with Julia Louis-Dreyfus. Louis-Dreyfus is set to develop new projects as both executive producer and star.

In May 2020, Apple signed a two-year production deal with Annie Weisman, the creator of Almost Family. As part of her deal with Apple, Weisman will create television projects exclusively for Apple TV+. In July 2020, Apple signed a multi-year deal with The Maurice Sendak Foundation to produce new children's television series and specials based on Maurice Sendak's books and illustrations. In August 2020, Apple signed a multi-year first-look deal with Leonardo DiCaprio's film and television production company, Appian Way Productions. Also in August 2020, Apple signed a multi-year first-look deal with Martin Scorsese's film and television production company, Sikelia Productions.

In September 2020, Apple officially acquired the film Cherry, directed by Anthony and Joe Russo and starring Tom Holland, for around $40 million. It was released in theaters on February 26, 2021, before streaming exclusively on Apple TV+ on March 12. In October 2020, Apple announced it had struck a deal with comedian and former anchor of Comedy Central's The Daily Show, Jon Stewart, to host a regular, hour-long series on topics of national interest, The Problem with Jon Stewart, premiered in the fall of 2021. In November 2020, Steven Lightfoot signed a multi-year overall production deal with Apple, starting off as showrunner of the upcoming drama Shantaram.

==== 2021 ====
In January 2021, Apple TV+ announced a new show, WeCrashed, that follows the launch, rise, and fall of WeWork. Jared Leto and Anne Hathaway played Adam and Rebekah Neumann. In addition, Apple bought the Sundance Film Festival hit CODA, about a girl who is the only person in her family who can hear, paying a festival-record $25 million for the film's worldwide rights. In February 2021, it was reported that Apple and Skydance Animation entered into a multi-year partnership to develop animated kids and family films and television programs. A few months earlier, Apple acquired the global distribution rights to Skydance's films Luck, released in August 2022, and Spellbound, however the partnership between Skydance Animation and Apple was later canceled in October 2023, with Netflix acquiring the distribution rights to Spellbound as part of a newly formed multi-year partnership between Netflix and the studio.

In March 2021, Apple announced a multi-year programming partnership with Nobel Peace Prize winner Malala Yousafzai. Apple also signed a multi-year, first-look deal with Imagine Entertainment's film division, in addition to extending its first-look deal with Imagine Documentaries. Additionally, Natalie Portman and production partner Sophie Mas signed a multi-year first-look deal with Apple for television projects developed and produced under their new production company MountainA. March also brought an overall multi-year first-look deal with Tracy Oliver, reportedly worth well into the "eight-figure range".

In June 2021, Sian Heder, the director of the Apple-acquired Sundance hit CODA, signed a multi-year overall deal to exclusively write and develop series for Apple, in addition to signing a first-look deal for any films written by Heder. In July 2021, Misha Green, the creator and showrunner of Lovecraft Country, signed a multi-year overall deal with Apple to exclusively create and develop new television series for Apple TV+. In July, Apple also signed a first-look deal with Alexander Rodnyansky's production company, AR Content, for future Russian-language and multilingual television series. Additionally, Apple signed a multi-year, first-look deal with Adam McKay's production company, Hyperobject Industries, for upcoming scripted feature films.

In October 2021, Sam Catlin signed an overall deal with Apple to develop scripted TV series for Apple TV+ under his Short Drive Entertainment. In November 2021, John Skipper and Dan Le Batard, under their content company Meadowlark Media, signed a multi-year first-look deal with Apple to produce documentary films and unscripted series for Apple TV+. Meadowlark Media hired Deirdre Fenton as an executive director of unscripted programming to lead the relationship with Apple.

==== 2022 ====
In January 2022, Apple ordered to series a television continuation of the MonsterVerse produced by Legendary Entertainment, featuring Godzilla and other outsized creatures. Also in January, 2022, producer Kevin J. Walsh signed a multi-year deal to produce film and television for the streamer.

==== 2023 ====
In October 2023, the partnership between Skydance Animation and Apple ended, with Skydance continuing the live-action feature film partnership signed in 2022. WondLa, an animated series based on the book series by Tony DiTerlizzi, would still debut on Apple TV+ while films such as Spellbound would be moved to Netflix. On October 19, 2023, shortly before filming was set to start on season 3 of The Problem with Jon Stewart, it was announced that the show was cancelled due to creative differences between Stewart and Apple. Stewart told The New York Times that Apple pushed back on episodes about China and artificial intelligence.

Apple TV+ released its first movie in theaters, Killers of the Flower Moon. Apple said that its primary goal in releasing the film was to attract more subscribers, not to do well at the box office, but it brought in $145 million. Apple TV+ also released another movie, Napoleon. Apple is seemingly pleased with its box-office returns, which reached $221 million and nearly made back its budget. It was apparent that Apple attempted to compete with movie production companies.

=== Professional sports ===
In March 2022, Apple announced that it would air Friday Night Baseball, a weekly doubleheader of Major League Baseball (MLB) games with live pre- and postgame shows on Apple TV+ in the United States, Canada, Australia, Brazil, Japan, Mexico, Puerto Rico, South Korea, and the United Kingdom starting in the 2022 Major League Baseball season.

In June 2022, Major League Soccer (MLS) announced that Apple had acquired the global streaming rights to the league beginning in the 2023 season. All regular season and playoff matches are streamed on MLS Season Pass, a subscription offering separate from the Apple TV subscription. Apple TV subscribers can watch select games at no additional charge, and receive a discount on the MLS Season Pass. Beginning in 2026, MLS Season Pass will be discontinued and all MLS content will be included in Apple TV.

In October 2025, it was announced that Apple had acquired the U.S. rights to Formula One beginning in the 2026 season under a five-year agreement. All Grands Prix will stream exclusively for Apple TV subscribers, with practice sessions and selected events streaming for free. Apple acquired the exclusive United States media rights to Formula One for Apple TV in a five-year deal beginning in May 2026.

=== Acquisition of back catalog film and TV content ===
In mid-2020, Apple began discussions with film and television studios to license their previously released content as part of an effort to build a back catalog of non-original films and television shows for the streaming service. The shift was designed to help the service better compete against the large content libraries competitors like Netflix have. This represented a pivot for Apple, which had initially attempted to build the service entirely on original content, avoiding licensing fees to help keep monthly subscription fees low, and relying on its Apple TV Channels content partners to supply other content users wanted.

Analysts believed that the addition of older, highly re-watchable content like popular sitcoms and well-liked films would help retain the slowly growing subscriber base while Apple continues to develop original content. The shift was also an acknowledgement of poor growth, especially relative to competing services. The back catalog development was also seen as a move to attempt to persuade free trial users to transition into paid users as the first wave of one-year trials was scheduled to expire in November 2020.

On May 26, 2020, Apple announced its first acquisition of catalogue content would be the Fraggle Rock series. In addition to being the exclusive home of the 1983–1987 Jim Henson Company series, Apple would develop a new, full-length, rebooted Fraggle Rock series after the success of the Fraggle Rock: Rock On! short-form series on Apple TV+. On October 19, 2020, Apple announced the exclusive transmission rights of the various animated productions of the Peanuts franchise, withdrawing them from broadcast television after 55 years; as part of that agreement, Apple TV+ must make the major Peanuts specials available for free in short windows. After an outcry from fans of the specials, Apple sublicensed A Charlie Brown Thanksgiving and A Charlie Brown Christmas to PBS for commercial-free airing. In 2021, It's the Great Pumpkin, Charlie Brown also came to the PBS rotation. The PBS sublicensing arrangement ended before October 2022. In March 2024, Apple made 51 catalog films available under a "Great Movies special collection" banner.

== Growth and impact ==
Apple has announced a number of partnerships, bundles, and initiatives to increase subscriber growth in the service. It has included Apple TV+ in several reduced-cost bundles designed to increase uptake and stickiness of subscriptions, including a bundle with Apple Music available for students, a bundle offering CBS All Access and Showtime for an additional $9.99 monthly for TV+ subscribers, and a bundling of the service as part of the Apple One subscription package. It has partnered with large cable television MSOs and telecommunications mobile network operators, such as Altice USA, the UK's EE, and Ireland's Eir TV, to offer those systems' customers Apple TV+ as part of a bundle, sometimes including an Apple TV 4K set-top box.

By February 2020, about 10 million people had signed up for Apple TV+. This included users who received a free one-year trial with the purchase of an Apple device, although it was estimated that less than 10% of Apple device owners eligible for the trial had activated it, perhaps because of Apple's failure to promote the service, Apple's desire to slow the uptake rate due to accounting concerns, or users' lack of interest in the service's perceived poor content options. About half of those 10 million users actively used the service. In late 2020, the continuing expansion of availability of the Apple TV app to a growing number of smart TV platforms and to newer lines of PlayStation and Xbox video game consoles, specifically the PS4 and PS5, and the Xbox One, Series S, and Series X, was seen as potentially boosting subscriber numbers for Apple TV+, including as part of Apple One subscription bundle purchases.

On December 16, 2020, Google announced it would add the Apple TV app to its Chromecast with Google TV device in early 2021 and to its Android TV platform by June 1, 2021; Google made Apple TV available on its Chromecast with Google TV, as well as on select Sony and TCL smart TVs running the Google TV interface, on February 18, 2021. On December 18, 2020, the British Urban Film Festival announced that it was to be the first UK film festival to host all of its official selections on the Apple TV app.

The service received several nominations for the 2021 Golden Globe Awards in both the television and film categories and was regarded as having "established an impressive track record for turning out consistently good—and sometimes great—programming for subscribers, despite offering a much, much smaller overall offering." Apple's series Ted Lasso won four Primetime Emmy Awards in 2021, including Outstanding Comedy Series, Outstanding Lead Actor in a Comedy Series (Jason Sudeikis), Outstanding Supporting Actor in a Comedy Series (Brett Goldstein) and Outstanding Supporting Actress in a Comedy Series (Hannah Waddingham).

Apple TV+ is the first streaming service to win the Academy Award for Best Picture, with CODA at the 94th Academy Awards. As of March 2022, it is estimated to have 25 million paid subscribers and an additional 50 million viewers who access the service via promotions. Apple is partnering with Bharti Airtel to provide its music and video streaming services to the telecom company's premium clients in India from 2024 at no cost, providing the American behemoth access to thousands of users in the most populated country. On the 96th Academy Awards, Apple Films earned a record breaking 14 Oscar nominations, with Killers of the Flower Moon receiving 10 and Napoleon receiving 4. This marked the second time an Apple Films received a Best Picture nomination.

In October 2024, Amazon announced that Apple TV+ would be available as an add-on subscription on Amazon Prime Video in the United States later that month on October 15, with other countries to follow. In January 2025, Apple TV+ announced that the service would be free for the first weekend of 2025, from January 3 to January 5, as a way to "increase publicity and global knowledge" regarding their service, worldwide. In February 2025, Apple announced the Apple TV+ app is available to download from Google Play on Android mobile devices. In August 2025, Apple announced a 30% increase in Apple TV+ subscription fees in the US.

In September 2026, Apple began bundling the Apple TV service, as well as Apple Arcade, into iCloud+ in more than 100 countries, primarily smaller territories or those deemed to have greater price sensitivity such as India. In these countries, Apple TV is now included with all paid iCloud+ plans (which start at US$0.99 per month or a similar value in local currency); in applicable regions where Apple TV was already sold, the service is no longer available separately. This change introduced Apple TV into 59 new countries, extending the service's reach to 170 countries.
