= Varun Mathur =

Indian footballer (born 1998)

Personal information
- Full name: Varun Mathur
- Date of birth: 22 January 1998 (age 28)
- Place of birth: Mumbai, Maharashtra, India
- Position: Attacking midfielder

Team information
- Current team: Kenkre
- Number: 21

Youth career
- Kenkre
- DSK Shivajians
- 2016–2017: SportBund DJK Rosenheim
- 2017: Goa

Senior career*
Years	Team	Apps	(Gls)
2017–2019	Goa B	1	(0)
2019–2021	Chennai City	3	(0)
2021–	Kenkre	7	(0)
- * Club domestic league appearances and goals as of 21:33, 15 April 2022 (UTC)

Varun Mathur (born 22 January 1998), is an Indian professional footballer who plays as a forward for I-League club Kenkre.

== Club career ==
=== Earlier career ===
Born in Mumbai, Maharashtra, Mathur began his career with the Kenkre youth team. He then moved with his family to Coimbatore, Tamil Nadu where he played for his school's football team. He moved back to Mumbai at the age of 16 and participated in a trial with DSK Shivajians. He soon joined the club's under-16 side before gaining an opportunity to move to Germany and join the youth team at SB/DJK Rosenheim.

He stayed in Germany for a year before moving back to India to join FC Goa. He was part of the club's reserves side which participated in the I-League 2nd Division.

=== Chennai City ===
In 2020, Mathur joined I-League club Chennai City. He made his professional debut for the club on 16 February 2020 against TRAU, starting in a 0–0 draw.

=== Kenkre ===
In October September 2021, Mathur signed for Kenkre ahead of the I-League Qualifiers. Though the team missed out on promotion to the I-League, they eventually replaced Chennai City after they failed to comply with club licensing regulations.

On 4 March 2022, he made his first appearance for the club against Real Kashmir, in a 1–1 draw. The club finished in bottom after the phrase-1 and placed in relegation stage, achieved only 12 points and relegated to the 2022–23 I-League 2nd Division. They later participated in Baji Raut Cup in Odisha, but bowed out after defeat to Churchill Brothers in semi-final.

== Career statistics ==
=== Club ===
As of 15 April 2022

Club	Season	League			Cup		AFC		Total	
Club	Season	Division	Apps	Goals	Apps	Goals	Apps	Goals	Apps	Goals
Goa B	2018–19	I-League 2nd Division	1	0	0	0	—		1	0
Chennai City	2019–20	I-League	1	0	0	0	—		1	0
Chennai City	2020–21	I-League	2	0	0	0	—		2	0
Kenkre	2021	I-League 2nd Division	6	0	0	0	—		6	0
Kenkre	2021–22	I-League	1	0	0	0	—		1	0
Career total			11	0	0	0	0	0	11	0

== See also ==
- List of Indian football players in foreign leagues
