= Maayan Sheleff =

Israeli independent curator and artist

- מעיין שלף
- Born: Tel Aviv, Israel
- Occupation: Art curator
- Years active: 2006–

Maayan Sheleff (Hebrew: מעיין שלף) is an independent art curator and researcher based in Tel Aviv, Israel. Her projects explore social and political issues through participatory practices, at the intersection of art and technology. Sheleff holds a Ph.D. in Practice in Curating in a joint program of the Department of Art at the University of Reading and the postgraduate program in Curating at the Zurich University of the Arts.

== Biography ==
Sheleff was raised in Kiryat Ono, Israel. She studied plastic arts at the Thelma Yellin High School of Arts, Givatayim. Sheleff graduated Bezalel Academy of Arts and Design with a B.Des in industrial design, also studying at the Rhode Island School of Design and Politecnico di Milano. She later pursued postgraduate studies at the Interdisciplinary Arts Program, Tel Aviv University. She received her PhD from the Curatorial Platform in Zurich University of the Arts (ZHdK) and Reading University, UK. Sheleff has been regularly teaching at the Bezalel Academy of Arts and Design, department of photography, the International Curatorial Studies Program of the Kibbutzim College, Tel Aviv, at the Sam Spiegel Film and Television School, Jerusalem and at Sapir Academic College, Sderot. She has been a guest lecturer in many institutions such as HaMidrasha – Faculty of the Arts, and the Technion – Israel Institute of Technology's Division of Continuing Education and External Studies curating program.

== Curatorial positions ==
- 2014– Artistic Advisor and chair of artistic committee at the Art Cube Artists' Studios, Jerusalem and curator of its international residency program, LowRes Jerusalem
- 2009–2012 – Curator at the Center for Contemporary Art (CCA), Tel Aviv
- 2009–2012 – Assistant Director at the International Curatorial Studies Program of the Kibbutzim College and the CCA Tel Aviv
- 2006–2009 – Director and chief curator of Line 16, a public gallery for contemporary art

== Awards, grants and residencies ==
- 2015 – International Curatorial Retreat, organized by Vessel/Mada, Bari, Italy
- 2014 – Residency Unlimited, NYC
- 2014 – Quartier 21, Vienna, invited by Paraflows Festival for Digital Art
- 2012 – Truth is Concrete, Steirischer Herbst Festival, Graz, Austria
- 2012–2013 – Artport residency, Tel Aviv
- 2012 – Artis grant recipient
- 2012 – International Studio & Curatorial Program (ISCP) Curator Award
- 2010 – Independent Curators International (ICI) Curatorial Intensive, New York City
- 2010 – Artis grant recipient

== Selected exhibitions ==
- 2027 – School of Listening, ZKM Center for Art and Media Karlsruhe, Karlsruhe, Germany (co-curated with Nora Sternfeld, in collaboration with Mira Hirtz and Philipp Ziegler)
- 2025 – Resounding Voice, a solo exhibition by Netta Weiser, Mamuta Art and Research Center, Hansen House, Jerusalem (co-curated with Lea Mauas).
- 2025 – Lundqvist, a solo exhibition by Naama Mokady, and Sonic Memory, a solo exhibition by Eitan Haviv, Mamuta Art and Research Center, Hansen House, Jerusalem.
- 2024 – School of Listening: (Im)possible Conversations, Museum der Moderne Salzburg, Salzburg, Austria (co-curated with Christina Penetsdorfer). Participating artists included Ofri Cnaani, Thalia Hoffman, Stav Marin, Samira Saraya, Neta Weiner, Manar Zuabi, Joan Jonas, and Peter Tscherkassky.
- 2024 – ’73–’23: Video Salon Between Two Wars, a fifty-work video anthology initiated by ZUMU – Museum on the Move, presented at the Negev Museum of Art and the Tel Aviv Museum of Art (co-curated with Milana Gitzin-Adiram and Shahar Ben-Nun). Participating artists included Yael Bartana, Guy Ben-Ner, Thalia Hoffman, Sigalit Landau, Ruth Patir, Nira Pereg, David Perlov, and Micha Ullman.
- 2023 – Voice Over #2, a performative gathering at the KW Institute for Contemporary Art, Berlin. Participating artists included Effi and Amir, Brandon LaBelle, Sunny Pfalzer with Lau Lukkarila and Slim Soledad, Public Movement, and Netta Weiser with Mădălina Dan and Agata Siniarska.
- 2021 – M/otherLand, a solo exhibition by Ruth Patir, OnCurating Project Space, Zürich, Switzerland.
- 2021 – InConcrete Stones, Art Cube Artists' Studios, Jerusalem. Participating artists were Hannan Abu-Hussein, Nikolaus Eckhard, Christoph Weber, Arkadi Zaides, and Avner Pinchover.
- 2020 – Voice Over, Bonnefantenmuseum, Maastricht, the Netherlands. Participating artists included Basel Abbas and Ruanne Abou-Rahme, Lawrence Abu Hamdan, Yusra Abu Kaf, Effi and Amir, Shilpa Gupta, Katarina Zdjelar, Domenico Mangano and Marieke van Rooy, and Amir Yatziv.
- 2019 – Grand Kenyon, a two-person exhibition by Ronit Porat and Guy Königstein, Art Cube Artists' Studios, Jerusalem.
- 2018 – (Un)Commoning Voices and (Non)Communal Bodies, Zurich University of the Arts and Tanzhaus Zürich, Switzerland, followed by Reading International, Reading, United Kingdom (co-curated with Sarah Spies). Participating artists included Zbyněk Baladrán, Željka Blakšić, Marco Godoy, Chto Delat and Dmitry Vilensky, Noam Enbar and Nir Shauloff, Jamila Johnson-Small and Fernanda Muñoz-Newsome, Mikhail Karikis, Tali Keren, Public Movement, Michal Oppenheim, Rory Pilgrim, Jack Tan, Nina Wakeford, and Katarina Zdjelar.
- 2018 – Rendering Borders, an exhibition by Morehshin Allahyari and Lior Zalmanson, Art Cube Artists' Studios, Jerusalem.
- 2017 – Poland ↔ Israel, Museum of Contemporary Art in Kraków (co-curated with Agnieszka Sachar, in collaboration with Miri Segal)
- 2015 – Preaching to the Choir, Herzliya Museum of Contemporary Art
- 2014 – The Infiltrators, Artport Tel Aviv
- 2013 – The Promised Land, The Tokyo Metropolitan Museum of Photography, Tokyo, Japan
- 2012 – Other Lives, Bloomfield Science Museum, Jerusalem, a new-media exhibition inspired by scientist Allan Turing
- 2012 – Secondary Witness, International Studio & Curatorial Program, Brooklyn, New York City
- 2012 – Connected, An Exhibition About Girls and the Internet, Bat Yam Promenade
- 2012 – Prolonged Exposure, The Center for Contemporary Art (CCA), Tel Aviv
- 2009–2010 – Co-curator, Transit project, cooperation between The Center for Contemporary Art (CCA), Tel Aviv and MADRE, Naples, Italy
- 2009 – Co-curator, ARTLV – the 1st Tel Aviv-Yafo Biennial

== Selected publications ==
- 2022 – InConcrete Stones, participating artists: Hannan Abu-Hussein, Nikolaus Eckhard, Avner Pinchover, Christoph Weber, Arkadi Zaides, Art Cube Artists' Studios, Jerusalem
- 2021 – M/otherland, Ruth Patir & Maayan Sheleff, OnCurating, Zurich. ISBN 9798744646660
- 2019 – (Un)Commoning Voices and (Non)Communal Bodies, Maayan Sheleff & Sarah Spies (Eds.), OnCurating, Zurich. ISBN 9798744646660
- 2019 – Grand Kenyon, participating artists: Ronit Porat, Guy Konigstein, Art Cube Artists' Studios, Jerusalem. ISBN 978-965-7655-21-4
- 2018 – Rendering Borders, participating artists: Morehshin Allahyari, Lior Zalmanson, Art Cube Artists' Studios, Jerusalem. ISBN 978-965-7655-15-3
- 2017 – Fear and Love in Graz: Steirischer Herbst’s Truth Is Concrete (2012), in Empty Stages, Crowded Flats – Performativity as Curatorial Strategy – Performing Urgency #4, Florian Malzacher and Janna Warsza (Eds.), Alexander Verlag, Berlin ISBN 978-3-89581-443-3
- 2017 – "Jerusalem of Gold" vs. "The Yelllow Fleet" & "The Day When Nothing Happened", Art Cube Artists' Studios, Jerusalem. ISBN 978-965-7655-115
- 2017 – 50 Years, B'Tselem
- 2016 – »The Infiltrators« – Crossing Borders with Participatory Art, in Geflüchtete und Kulturelle Bildung Formate und Konzepte für ein neues Praxisfeld, Maren Ziese & Caroline Gritschke (Ed.), Transcript Verlag, Bielefeld. ISBN 978-3-8394-3453-6
- 2016 – The Chosen People - A Small Guide For a Big Revolution, a conversation with Andy Bichlbaum from The Yes Men, Tohu online magazine
- 2014 – The Infiltrators, Artport Tel Aviv
- 2012 – Secondary Witness, International Studio & Curatorial Program (ISCP). ISBN 9780985574109
- 2012 – World Order, Dana Levy, Braverman Gallery and CCA Tel Aviv. ISBN 9789657463161
