= Yavin (surname) =

Yavin (Hebrew: יָבִין) is a surname. Notable people with the surname include:

- Haim Yavin (1932–2026), Israeli television anchor and documentary filmmaker
- Jonathan Yavin, Israeli author
