= Isabelle Le Normand =

French artist, writer and curator

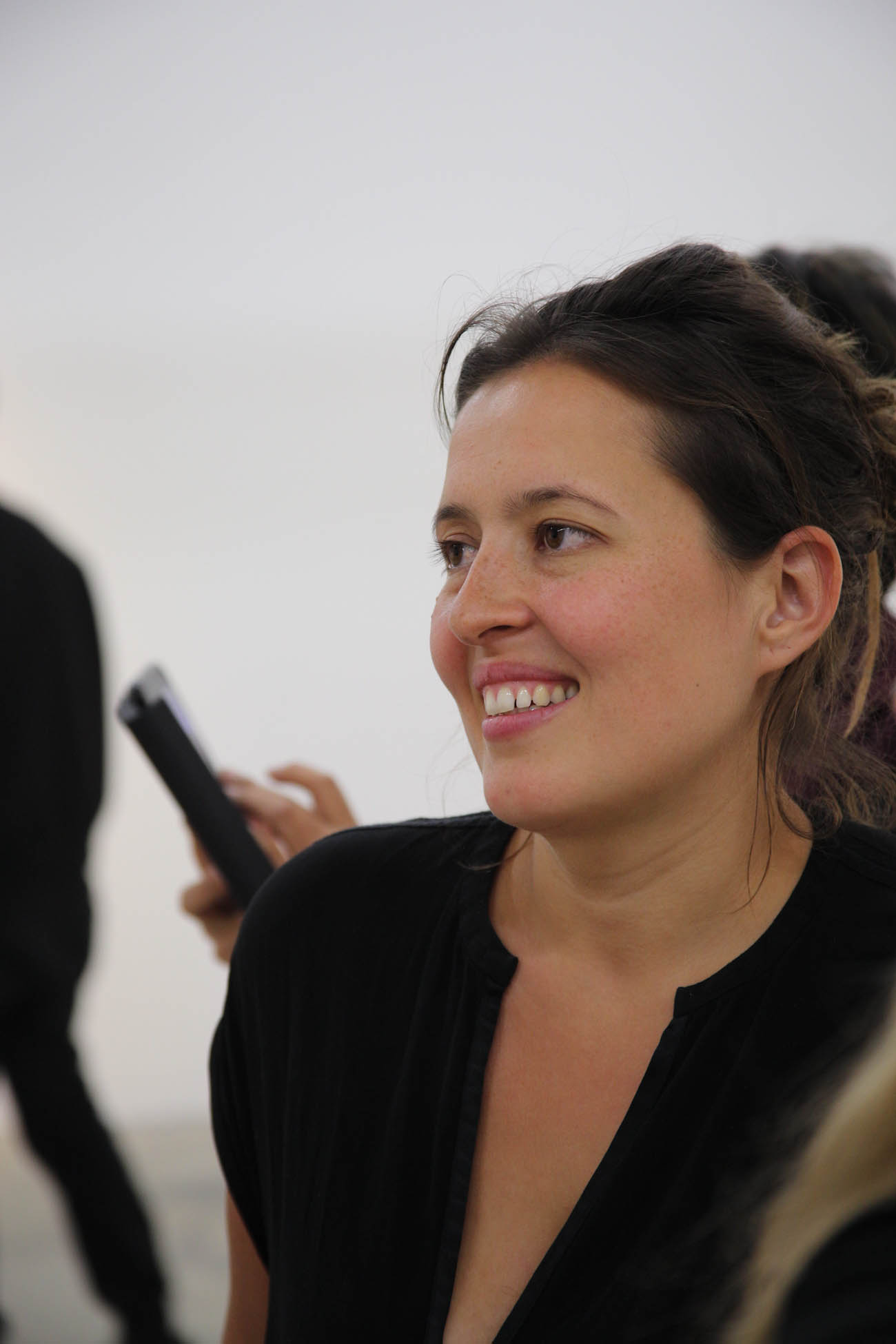
- Born: 1980 (age 45–46)
- Occupation: Curator
- Organization: Mains d'Oeuvres (2008-2013)

Isabelle Le Normand is a French contemporary art curator based in Los Angeles, California who has curated exhibitions and events internationally. After her double Master's from the Sorbonne in curatorial studies and art history, Le Normand curated for public institutions in Paris: at Mains d'Oeuvres where she was director and curator for six years; Palais de Tokyo; at Galerie Anne Barrault; La Box in Bourges; in Los Angeles at ForYourArt, Machine Project, and 18th Street Arts Center; at private collector Danny First's house and galleries Anne Barrault in Paris, FKSE in Budapest. She completed residencies at the Total Museum and Gwangju Biennale in South Korea, the Stroom Foundation in the Netherlands, Cité des arts in Paris, Komplot in Brussels, and Residency Unlimited in New York. At Mains d'Oeuvres she built a large audience and distinguished the space in the international arts community through innovative, multidisciplinary programming.

Exhibitions

- Nuit Blanche: Wim Delvoye/ Laurent Grasso, Iesa, 2003
- Diagonal Argument, cocurated with Florence Ostende, Bétonsalon, 2008
- Better Being a virus than catching a cold, Mains d’Œuvres, 2008
- 23 minutes and 17 seconds, 2009
- Operation tonnerre, Mains d’Œuvres, 2009
- The Farrell Family, cocurated with Florence Ostende, Mains d’Œuvres, Maison Pop, 2010
- Who do you admire? Cocurated with Florence Ostende, La Box, Bourges, 2011
- Without you, nothing will happen, 2011
- An Auction, 2011
- Une chaînette relie toutes les pendeloques et forme le corps principal de l’objet,: Jean-Luc Blanc and Michel Blazy, Mains d’Œuvres, 2012
- Collective Fictions, cocurated with Albertine de Galbert; Jesse McKee; Andrew Berardini; Anca Rujoiu, Palais de Tokyo, Paris, 2013
- Destiny the B's, Anne Barrault Gallery, Paris, 2013
- Sex in Museums: Jon Bernad, Swab, Barcelona, 2013

In Los Angeles

- My next life, ForYourArt, Here is Elsewhere, Danny First's house, 2013
- Confidential, The Impermanent Collection, 2013
- Argote and Bastard studios, 18th Streets Arts Center, Santa Monica, 2013
- Museum of Destiny, The Impermanent Collection, Los Angeles, 2013
- The work of the work, UC Santa Barbara, 2014.

Residencies

- Public School, Brussels, 2010
- Gwangju Biennale, 2011
- 18th Streets Arts Center, Santa Monica, 2013
- Residency Unlimited, New York 2014
- Roadshow Gyeonju, Total Museum, Seoul, 2014

Events

- Diagonal Argument program, Betonsalon, 2008
- Talk with Thomas Hirschhorn, Mains d’Œuvres, 2008
- Concours de rhétorique, Maison Pop, 2010
- Emily Mast, Mains d’Œuvres, 2012
- Born to curate: by Pauline Bastard and Ivan Argote, Santa Monica, 2013
- Paris at your home / Los Angeles at your home, Machine Project and Mains d’Œuvres, 2013
- Dawn Kasper, Mains d’Œuvres, 2013
- Megan Daalder, Mains d’Œuvres, 2011
- Luke Fischbeck, Mains d’Œuvres, 2013
- Nikki Darling, Kulapat Yantrasast's house
- Sarah Gail, Rachel Mason and Deenah Vollmer at Maryanne Tagney and David Jones house

Publications

- Diagonal Argument
- Who do you admire?
- Under a Spell: The Witchcraft of Elena Bajo
