= Residency Unlimited =

Artist's residency program

Residency Unlimited is an international artist's residency program in New York City, located within the former South Congregational Church in Carroll Gardens, in Brooklyn, New York. In addition to artist-in-residence programs, Residency Unlimited also hosts temporary exhibitions and commissions and public programs which are free and open to the public.

Notable alumni: Lauren Berkowitz, Isabelle Le Normand, Avi Lubin, Maayan Sheleff, Hyon Gyon, Taro Masushio, Fatma Shanan, Tuguldur Yondonjamts, Regina Parra

== Sources ==
- Are You an Emerging Artist Looking to Raise Your Game? Here Are 7 Residencies That Can Help, Artnet Brian Boucher & Caroline Goldstein, July 27, 2017
- THE END OF THE GRAND TOUR? VIRTUAL SYMPOSIUM ON ARTIST RESIDENCIES: FUTURE, PLACE AND STATe, Francisco Guevara,2020
- Conceptualising the value of artist residencies: A research agenda, K Lehman - Cultural Management: Science and Education, 2017
- How an art residency program is fueling the creative Saudi spirit, Ruba Obaid, Arab News
- Art/Work - Revised & Updated: Everything You Need to Know (and Do) As You Pursue Your Art Career, Heather Darcy Bhandari, Jonathan Melber
