= Hannan Abu-Hussein =

Palestinian artist (born 1972)

Hannan Abu-Hussein (in Arabic: حنان أبو حسين; born 1972 in Umm-El-Fahem) is a Palestinian visual artist and educator. She is known for installation art and video art. Abu-Hussein lives in Jerusalem.

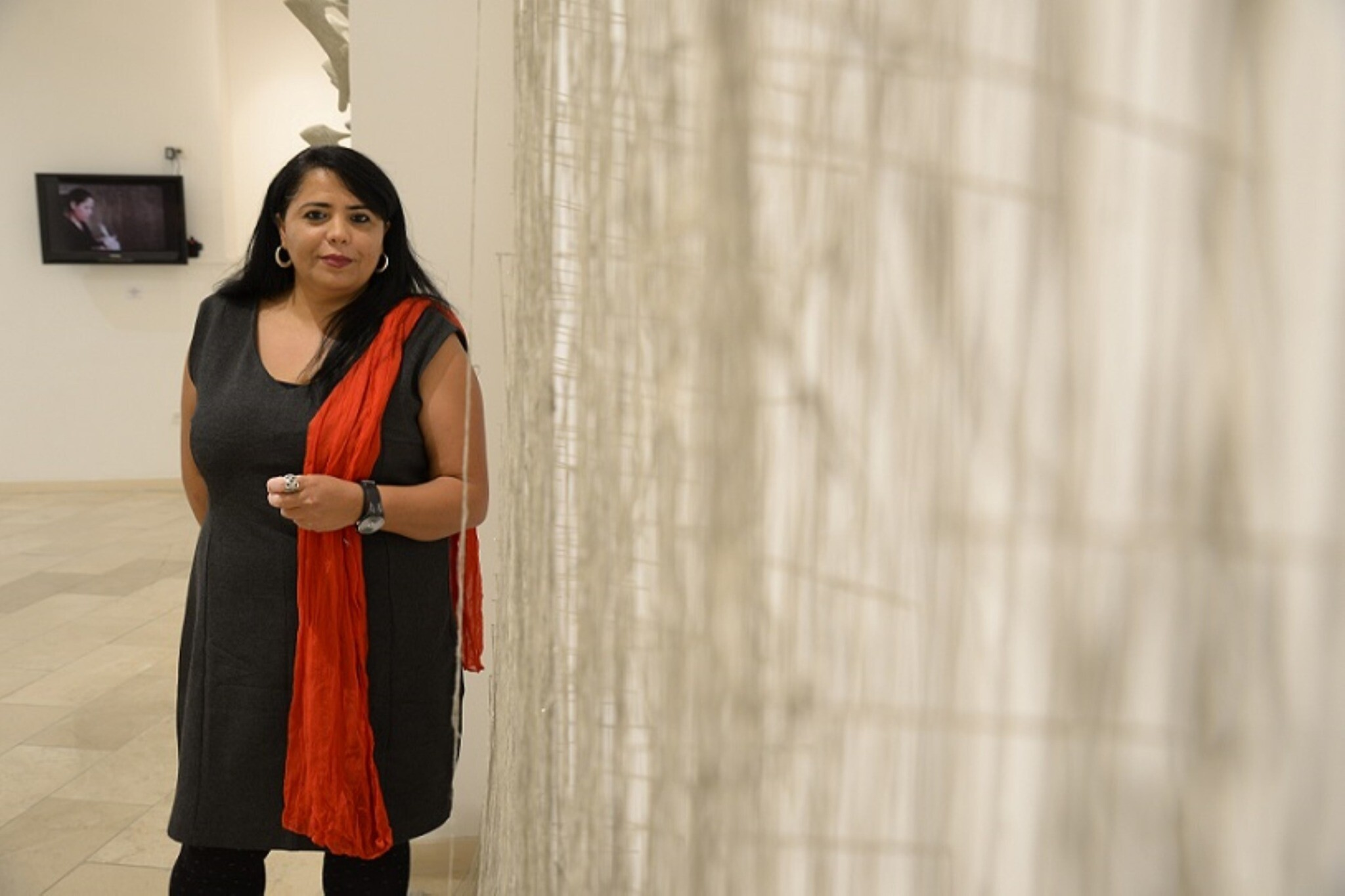

== Early life and education ==
Hannan Abu-Hussein was born in 1972 in the city of Umm al-Fahm as the youngest daughter amongst four older brothers.

She studied art at the Max Stern Yezreel Valley College (1992–1995) and earned a B.F.A. from the Bezalel Academy of Arts and Design, Jerusalem (1995–1999). She continued her studies, earning a diploma in Organizational Management of Art Institutes from Tel Aviv University (2000–2001) and a postgraduate diploma at the ceramics at Bezalel Academy of Arts and Design, Jerusalem (2001–2003) as well as an M.A in art history from the Hebrew University (graduating 2016). Abu-Hussein also holds a teacher's certificate in art education from the Hebrew University (2002); a diploma in group instruction from the Tel Aviv University (2012–2013); and studied Israeli Art at the Tel Aviv-Yafo Academy (2015).

== Career ==
Abu-Hussein's work is inspired by the oppression and exclusion of women in her community, whose experiences are a consequence of belonging to a religious and national minority. Abu-Hussein's art examines the status of women within all patriarchal societies, considering issues such as sexual violence, traditional gender roles, family honor, and the meaning of home. The Ministry of Education Young Artist Prize committee describe her as “an aware and uncompromising artist who uses charged imagery that touches specific characteristics that deal with women's position in the Arab culture.”

For many years Abu-Hussein has been examining local floor tiles (balatot) and using concrete as a key material. In her 2019 "Body Fragments" exhibition at the Haifa Museum of Art, for instance, the artist's installation consisted of used brassieres fixed in cast concrete. “Concrete is a central characteristic that is essential to Abu-Hussein’s work and which connects it. It is a hard substance, that connects to ideas like construction, stability, inflexibility, borders, walls, homes. The concrete is combined with feminine objects and imagery thus creating conflicts within the material and concepts. Monuments that are painful, prickly, vulnerable and fragile, created from a struggle for independence, equality and for freedom”, writes Shirley Meshulam, who curated Abu-Hussein's show “Deep Breath” at the Grand Art Gallery in Haifa. “The materials that she uses are simple, direct and strong. The objects that occupy her installations create a fascinating hallucinatory scene, that encourage the viewer to be in their proximity but simultaneously repulse him creating a sense of terror”, write the judges of the Creativity Encouragement Award in the 2010 catalog.

Since 2002, Abu-Hussein has started experimenting with video, which has become increasingly more central to her work. In Aida Nasrallah's words, “video as a tool enables her to check cultural boundaries and surface issues that touch gender and multiple identities, scrutinizing different aspects of oppression – cultural, social, gender-oriented, status and political.”

Abu-Hussein's studio is located in The New Gallery Artist Studios at Teddy Stadium in Jerusalem. In addition to her work as an artist, Abu-Hussein works as an educator in the youth department at the Israel Museum and at a public boys' school in Isawiya neighborhood of Jerusalem.

== Honors ==
- 2014: Ministry of Culture and Sport prize for plastic art
- 2012: Artist Book Award, Mifal Hapais Scholarship
- 2011: Master Teacher Award, Ministry of Education
- 2010: Creativity Encouragement Award, Ministry of Education
- 2004: Young Artist Prize, Ministry of Education
- 2002: Heinrich Boell Fund
- 2000-2002: American Israeli Fund for Outstanding Artist
- 1998-2000: American Israeli Fund for Outstanding Artist

== Solo exhibitions ==
- 2014: “Momentary Freedom”, Barbur Gallery, Jerusalem.
- 2014: “Deep Breath”, Grand Art Gallery, Haifa.
- 2009: “Broken”, Comme il Faut, Tel Aviv.
- 2008: “Under the Tile”, Office Gallery, Tel Aviv.
- 2008: “Samt el frashat”, Bet Ahoti Gallery, Tel Aviv.
- 2007: “Sharp Cover”, David Yellin Gallery, Jerusalem.
- 2006: “Daweer”, Levontine Gallery, Tel Aviv.
- 2003: “Stretched”, Antia Gallery, Jerusalem.

== Selected group exhibitions ==
- 2024: "New Worlds: Women to Watch 2024", The National Museum of Women in the Arts, Washington, DC, US
- 2017: “No Place Like Home”, Israel Museum, Jerusalem.
- 2016: “Allegory”, The Artists’ House, Tel Aviv.
- 2015: “Winners”, Tel Aviv Museum, Tel Aviv.
- 2014: “Triangle of Chicago”, Haifa Museum, Haifa.
- 2013: “Daughter of Zion, and the Exclusion of Women in Jerusalem”, The Artists’ House, Jerusalem.
- 2012: “Re: Visiting Rockefeller”, Rockefeller Museum, Jerusalem.
- 2012: “Spring 2012”, Mecca Gallery, NJ.
- 2011: “Encouragement Award Created”, Ramat Gan Museum, Ramat Gan.
- 2010: “Resonance Boxes”, Rubin Museum, Tel Aviv.
- 2010: “Childhood Stories”, Whitebox, Munich.
- 2010: “Women’s Rights & Excision”, Moissy Cramayel Gallery, Paris.
- 2009: “Jerusalem, Surface, Fractures”, The Artists’ House, Jerusalem.
- 2009: “Pieces”, Comme il-Faut Gallery, Tel Aviv.
- 2009: “Art Emergency”, Artneuland, Berlin.
- 2009: “Culture of Torture, Torture in Culture”, Artneuland, Berlin.
- 2008: “Fil(s) De Me`more”, Zukunftslabor Galerie, Stuttgart, Germany.
- 2008: “Raum für Video / Space for Video”, Figge Von Rosen Galerie, Berlin.
- 2008: “Momire de l` Avenir", the Cite` International des Art, Paris.
- 2008: “Language & Gender”, Artneuland, Berlin.
- 2007: “Out Let”, Comme il faut Gallery, Tel Aviv.
- 2007: “Desert Generation”, Jerusalem, Tel Aviv, Amsterdam.
- 2006: “Artneuland”, Berlin.
- 2006: “From the ashes come to me”, Khalil El Skakni Gallery, Ramallah.
- 2006: “New Territories”, Bruges, Belgium.
- 2006: “Erasing”, Bloomfield Science Museum, Jerusalem.
- 2006: “Offering Reconciliation”, Ramat Gan Museum, Ramat Gan.
- 2005: “Lieu Commun”, Main D'Oeuvres Gallery, Paris
- 2005: “Show your wound”, Kunsthaus Dresden, Germany.
- 2005: “Young Artists Reward”, Tel Aviv Museum, Tel Aviv.
- 2005: “Beauty and the Book”, Israel Museum, Jerusalem.
- 2005: “Walking on Eggs”, Ashdod Museum, Ashdod.
- 2003: “Triannual”, Museum of Modern Art, Haifa.
