= Mabat =

Israeli television news program (1968-2017)

- Logo 2006-2008
- Also known as: Mabat מבט
- מבט לחדשות
- Genre: News program
- Created by: Israel Broadcasting Authority
- Presented by: Jacob Eilon (2015–2016); Haim Yavin (1968–2008); Yinon Magal (2008–2012); Merav Miller (2008–2017); Jacob Ahimeir (1983–2017)
- Country of origin: Israel
- Original language: Hebrew

Production
- Production location: National
- Editor: Max Miller
- Running time: Varies
- Production company: Israel Broadcasting Authority

Original release
- Network: Israeli Channel 1
- Release: July 23, 1968 – May 9, 2017

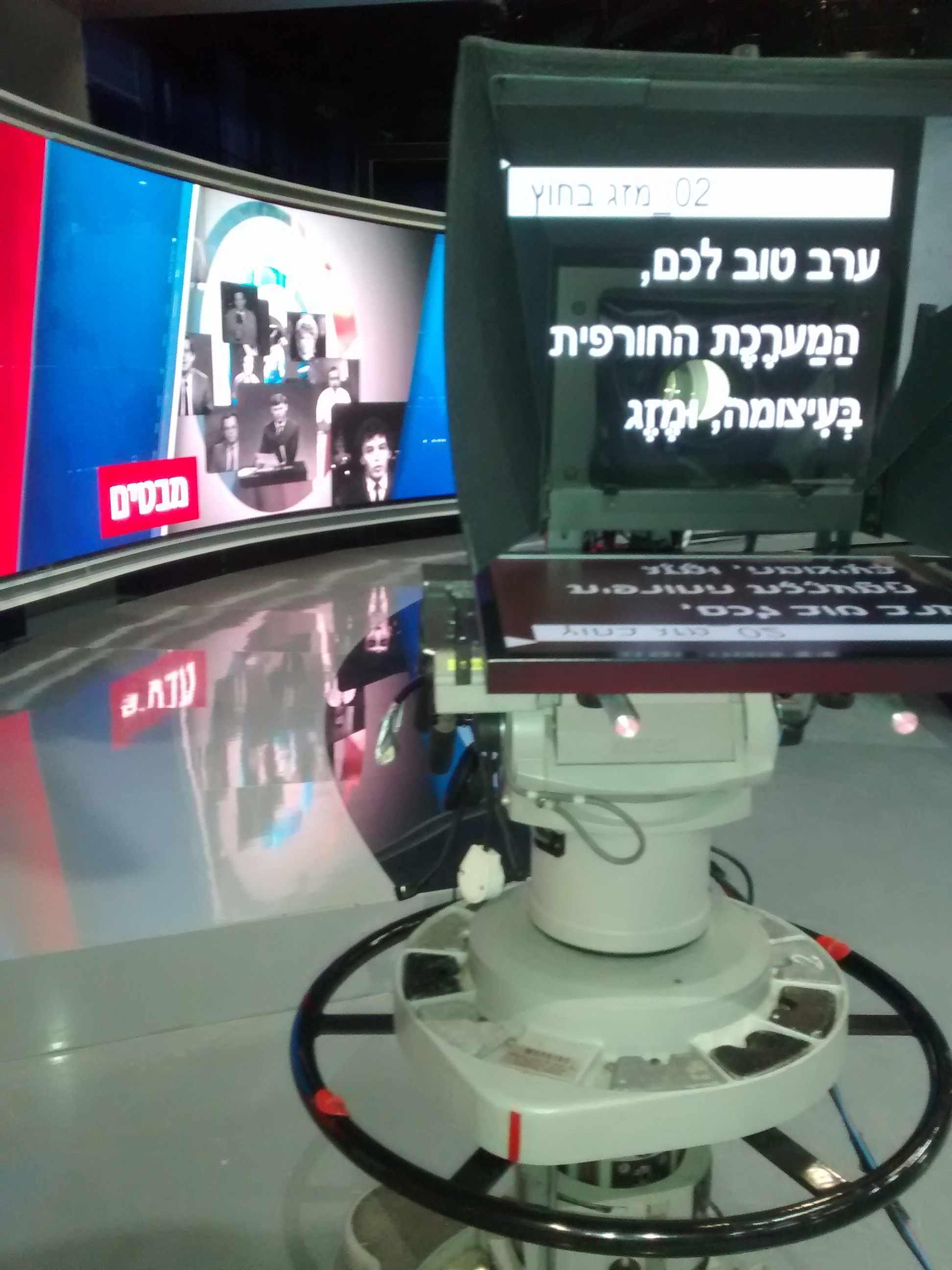
Mabat Studio and camera with teleprompter, in Jerusalem 2016

Mabat LaHadashot (Hebrew: מבט לחדשות lit. A Glance at the News, sometimes shortened to Mabat (Hebrew: מבט lit. view), was the IBA's flagship evening news program. It aired on Channel 1 from 1968 to May 9, 2017. It was Israel's first televised news program.

== History ==
Mabat LaHadashot aired daily on Israel's public Channel 1 and was operated by the Israel Broadcasting Authority, which held a broadcasting monopoly until 1991. The show provided a daily summary of news events through video reports and in-studio presentations. Haim Yavin hosted Mabat from its inaugural broadcast in 1968—the first televised news in Israel—until 2008. Known as "Mr. Television," Yavin became synonymous with Israeli news broadcasting during the program's monopoly years.

Before Israel's first commercial channel, Channel 2, was launched, Mabat LaHadashot was so popular that phone calls during its broadcast were considered informal, with many Israelis refraining from interruptions to watch it.

In its early years as a monopolistic news source, Mabat LaHadashot featured fewer stories and maintained a slower pace. Over time, particularly in response to competition from commercial channels, the number of story items grew, and their duration shortened. Despite these changes, the show's format for presenting news remained largely the same: an in-studio presenter or announcer, occasionally conducting interviews with field experts on relevant topics. The program was sometimes hosted by a male and female duo.

A November 1987 survey (conducted following the end of a 52-day strike at the IBA) showed that 75% of the sampled population watched Mabat.

In addition to serving as the name of Channel 1’s flagship news show, “Mabat” also became shorthand for Channel 1's news division, which produced a variety of other news programs. In June 2010, Mabat LaHadashot became Israel's first news program to broadcast in high-definition (HD 1080i).

== Mabat on radio ==
Mabat was also broadcast simultaneously on Reshet Bet, a Kol Yisrael radio station.

Originally airing at 9:00 pm local time, the program shifted in May 2012 to a new slot known as “shmoneh l’shmoneh” (eight minutes to eight).

== See also ==
- Channel 1 (Israel)
- Haim Yavin
