= Talbiya =

Coordinates: 31°46′N 35°13′E

Komemiyut (Talbiyeh) Hebrew: קוממיות (טלביה) Arabic: الطالبية
- Neighborhood of Jerusalem
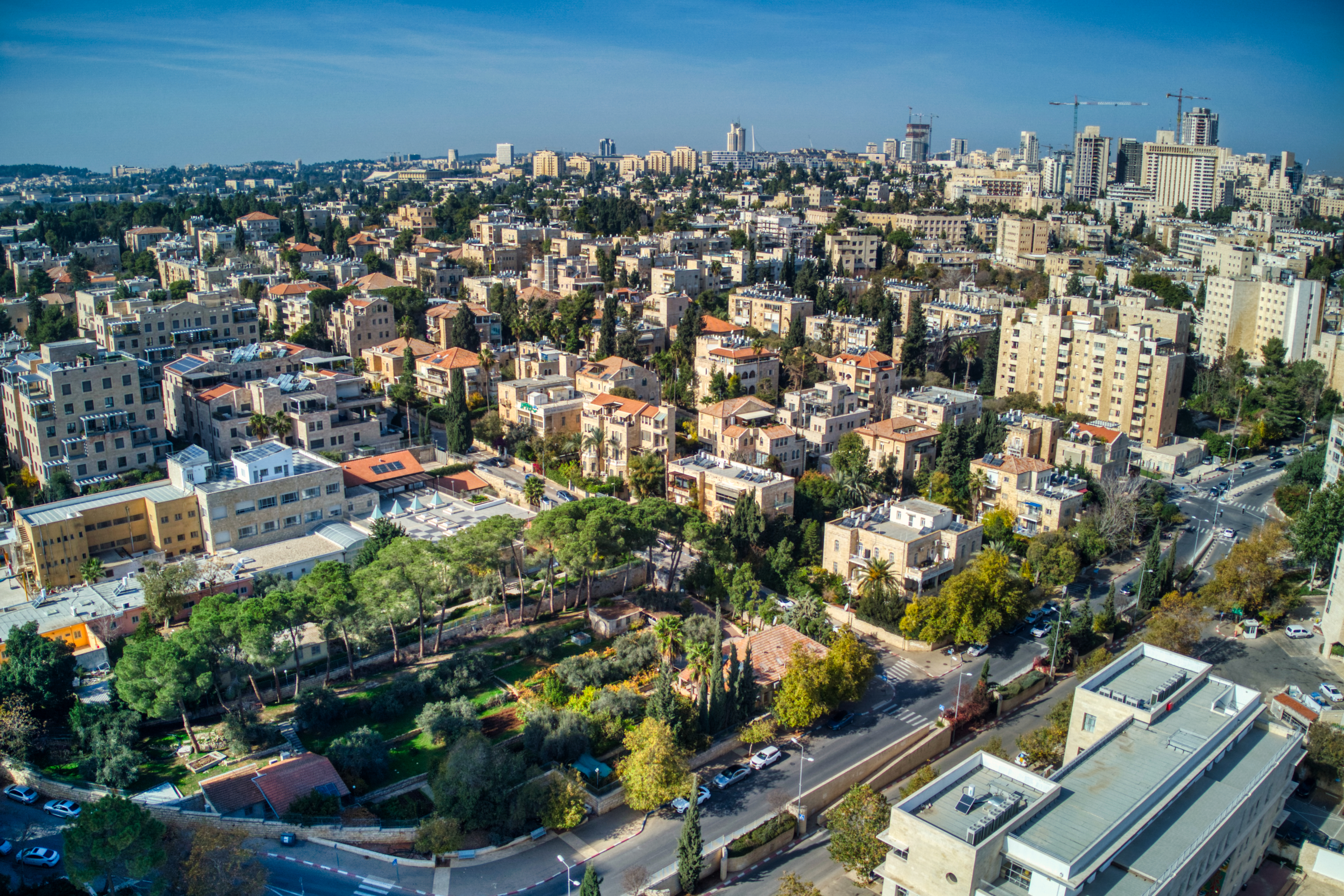
- Interactive map of Komemiyut (Talbiyeh)
- Country: Israel
- District: Jerusalem District
- City: Jerusalem
- Foundation: Early 1920s
- Founder: Christian Arabs from Jerusalem, Bethlehem and Beit Jala

Population (2017)
  - Total: 3,010

Talbiya or Talbiyeh (Arabic: الطالبية; Hebrew: טלביה), officially Komemiyut (Hebrew: קוממיות), is an upscale neighborhood in Jerusalem, between Rehavia and HaMoshava HaGermanit. It is renowned for its eclectic architectural styles, and often regarded as one of the most beautiful neighborhoods in the city.

Talbiya was built in the 1920s and 1930s on land purchased from the Greek Orthodox Patriarchate of Jerusalem. Most of the early residents were affluent Christian Arabs who built elegant homes with Renaissance, Moorish and Arab architectural motifs, surrounded by trees and flowering gardens.

The neighborhood is home to several significant national and municipal buildings, such as Beit HaNassi – the official residence of the President of Israel, the Hansen House, the Jerusalem Theatre, the Israel Academy of Sciences and Humanities, the Van Leer Institute, and the Museum for Islamic Art.

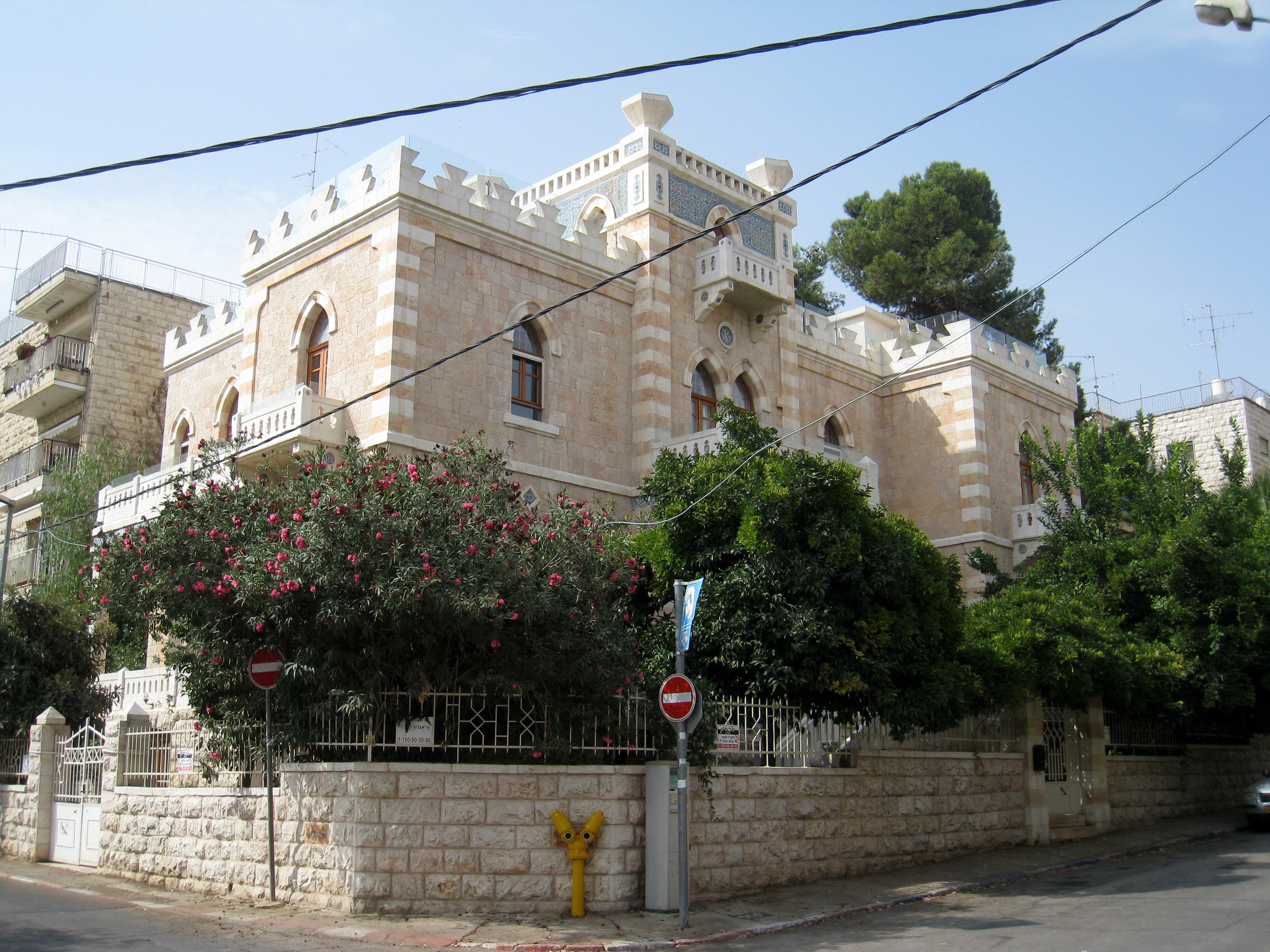
Beit Gelat

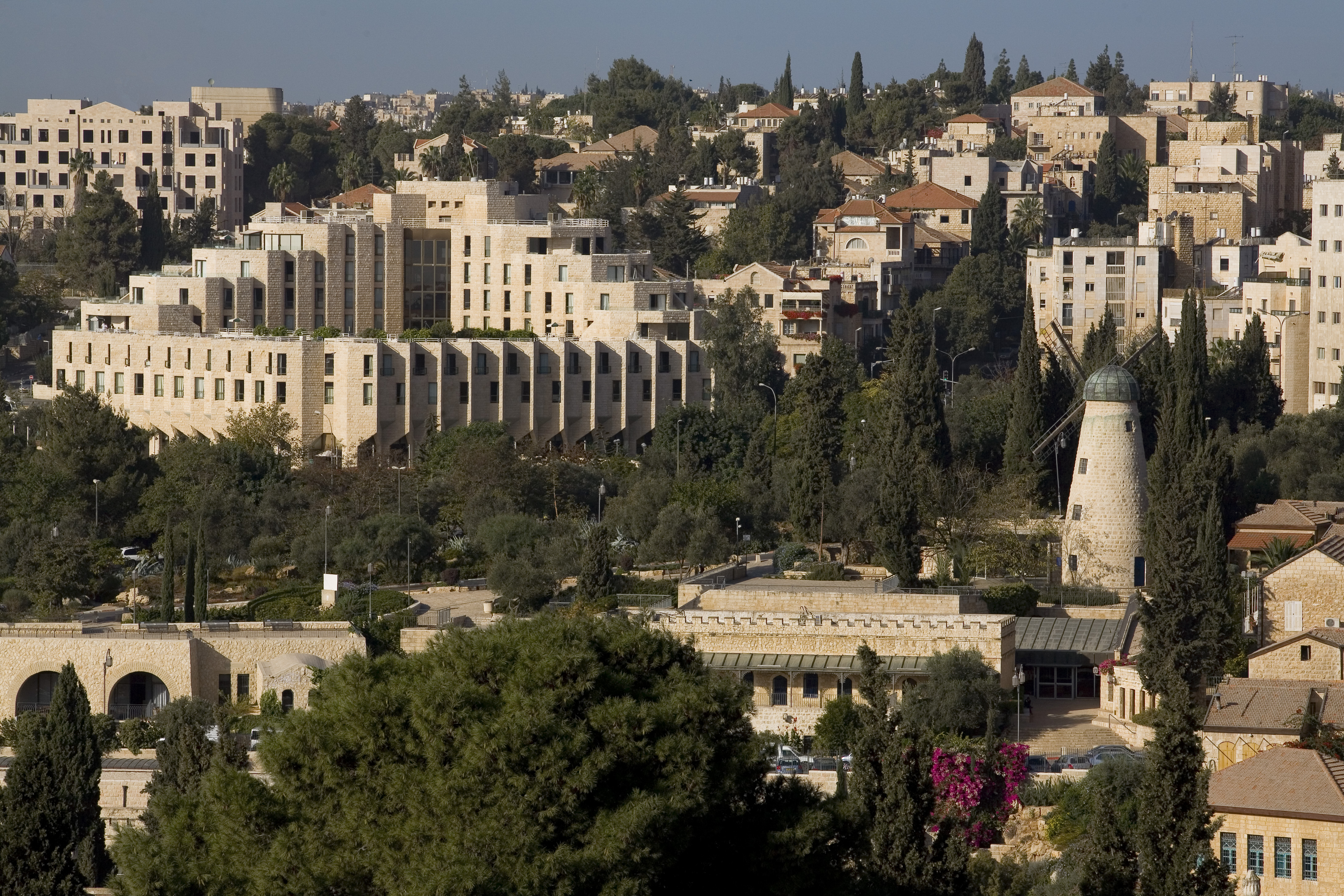
View of Talbiya from the Old City of Jerusalem

== History ==
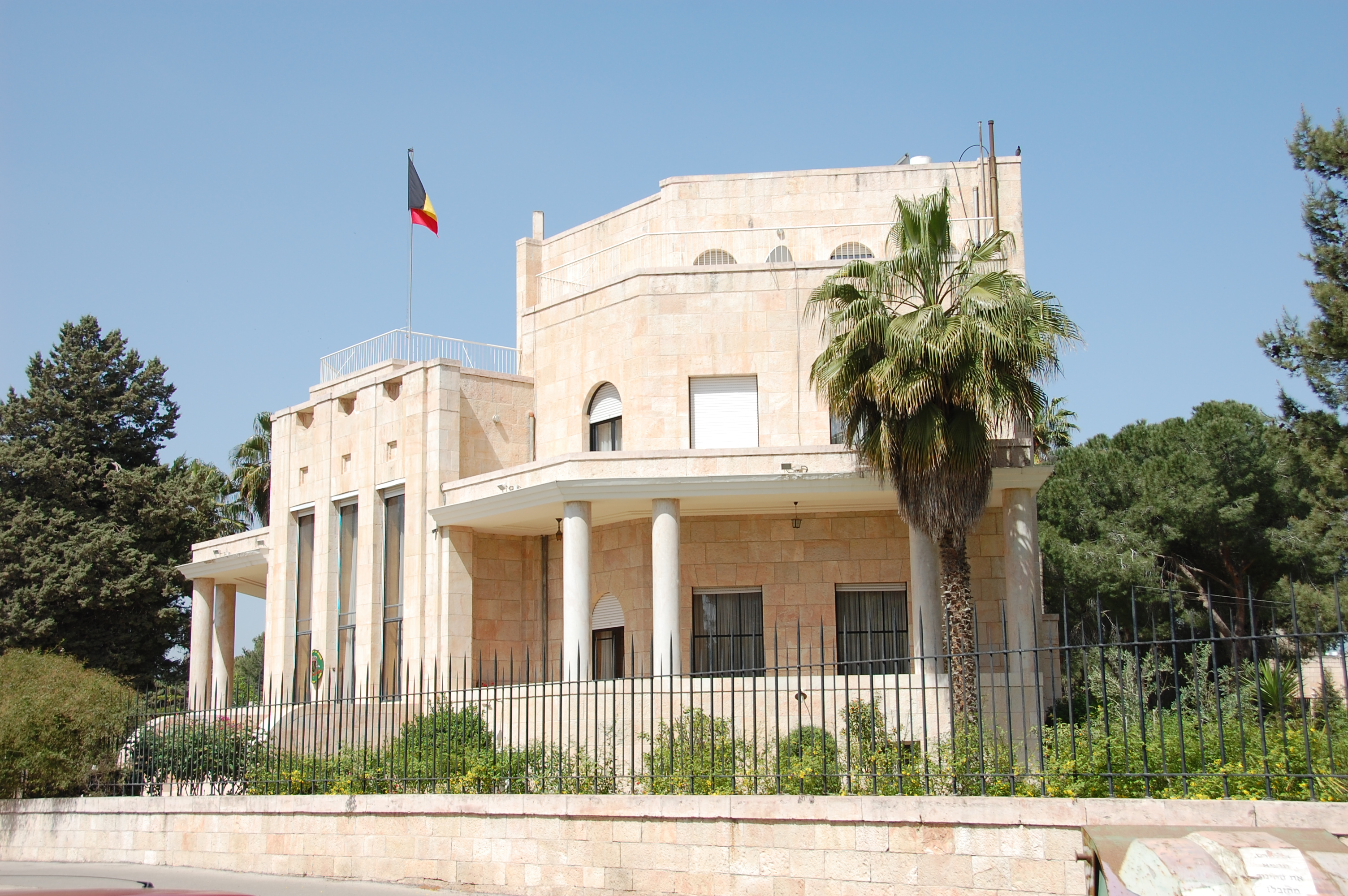
Villa Salameh in Talbiya

=== British Mandate ===
The area of Talbiya originally consisted of rocky terrain adorned with olive and mulberry trees. Development in this area commenced in the early 1920s when affluent Christian Arab merchants from Bethlehem, Beit Jala, and Ramallah acquired land to construct private residences or rental properties.

The land for constructing the neighborhood was acquired either directly from the Greek Orthodox Patriarchate or through Constantine Salameh, an Arab Christian who purchased large plots and subdivided them. After World War I, Salameh, a native of Beirut married to Catherine "Katy" Aboussouan of the centuries-old Palestinian Catholic family, bought land in Talbiya from the Greek Orthodox Patriarchate with the idea of building a prestigious neighborhood for Middle Eastern Christians. In addition to a villa for himself, Salameh built two apartment houses on the square that was named for him. These houses remain among the neighborhood's most exquisite properties today. Villa Salameh (1930), currently housing the Belgian Consulate at 21 Balfour Street, was designed in Art Deco style by French architect, Marcel Favier.

Talbiya's Gan Hashoshanim (Rose Garden) dates back to the 1930s. After the establishment of the State of Israel, official Independence Day events were held at this park.

=== State of Israel ===
After the 1948 Palestine war, many Arab residents of Talbiya including Salameh lost the right to their properties due to Israel's Absentee Property Law. Salameh sought to regain his property under a clause that distinguished between persons who left Israeli territory due to the conflict and those who were absent for other reasons, but after being convinced that the High Court would not rule in his favor for fear of creating a precedent he accepted a symbolic $700,000 in compensation for all of his multimillion-dollar properties located in Israel. Many of the homes were acquired or repurposed by Jewish immigrants and Israeli institutions. However, the neighborhood maintained its architectural charm and evolved into an esteemed residential area over time.

Before the 1967 Six-Day War, many of the villas in Talbiya housed foreign consulates. The home of Constantine Salameh, which he leased to the Belgian consulate, faces a flowering square, originally Salameh Square, later renamed Wingate Square to commemorate Orde Wingate, a British officer who trained members of the Haganah in the 1930s. Marcus Street is named for Colonel David (Mickey) Marcus, an officer in the U.S. army who volunteered to be a military advisor in the 1948 Arab–Israeli War.

The neighborhood's Hebrew name Komemiyut, (קוממיות) introduced as a hebraization after the establishment of the state, never caught on, and it is still known as Talbiya. The streets of Talbiyeh are named after influential figures in Jewish history, such as Lord Arthur Balfour and Ze’ev Jabotinsky.

As of 2024, the average cost of a house in Talbiya was estimated to be NIS 6.6 million, while the average rent for an apartment was NIS 10,000 per month.

== Landmarks ==
The neighborhood's prestige is evident in its proximity to significant state and municipal buildings, including Beit HaNassi – the official residence and office of the President of Israel, Hansen House, the Jerusalem Theatre, the National Academy of Sciences, the Van Leer Institute, and the Museum for Islamic Art.

=== Beit HaNassi (President's Residence) ===
Beit HaNassi, or the President's Residence, is the official residence of the President of Israel, serving as both living quarters and office. Designed by Israeli architect Aba Elhanani in the Modernist style, it became the residence of Israel's presidents in 1971, starting with Zalman Shazar. The venue hosts various official state functions, including government officials' swearing-in ceremonies and the presentation of credentials by foreign ambassadors.

=== Hansen House ===
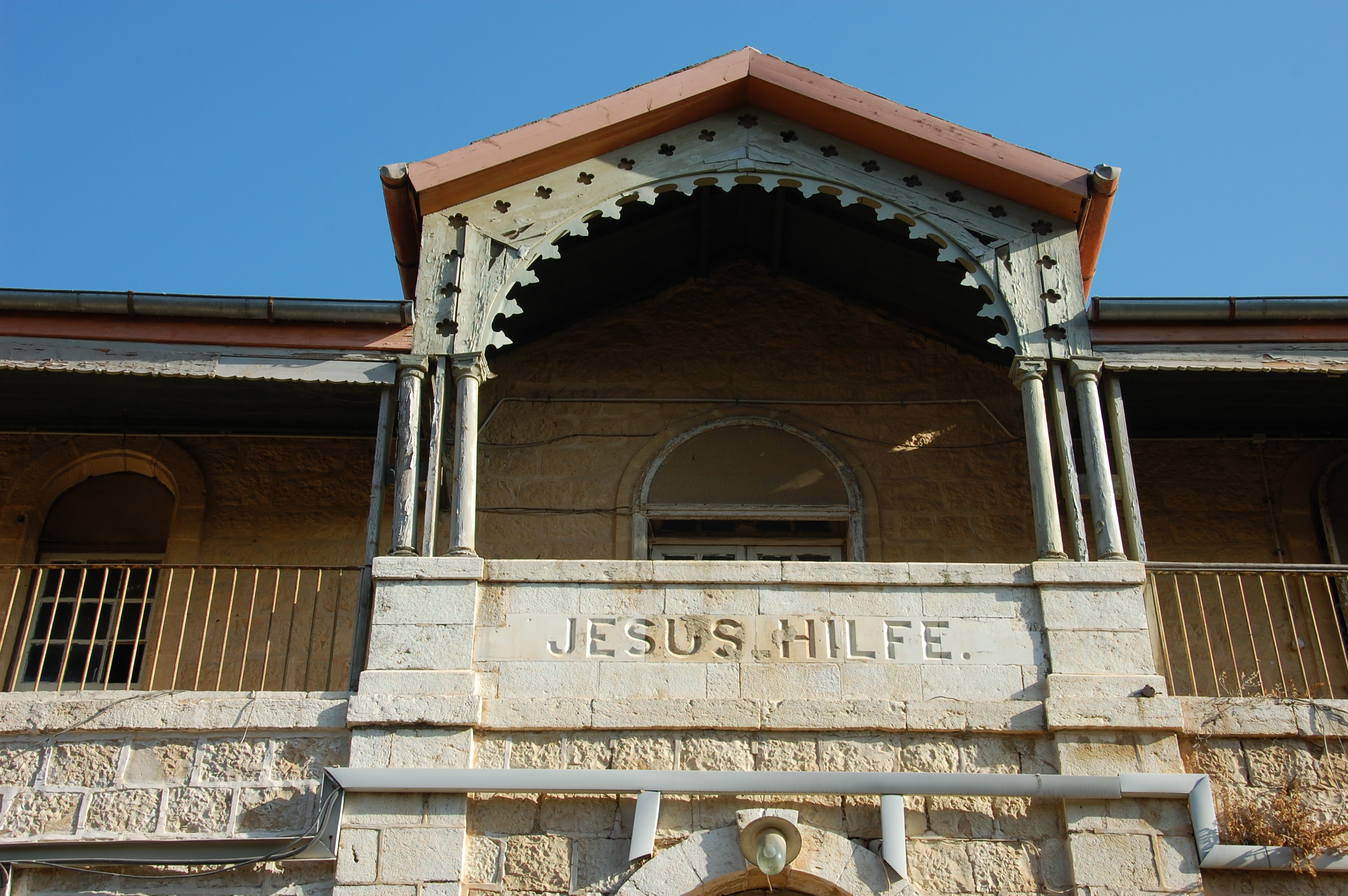
Hansen Lepers Hospital, Talbiya

Hansen House, originally established in 1887 as the Jesus Hilfe Asyl by the Protestant German community, served as a leprosy asylum. Designed by German architect Conrad Schick, it mixed European styles with adaptations suitable for Jerusalem's environment. After operating as a leprosy hospital until the 1950s, it underwent restoration in the 21st century and reopened in 2013 as a center for design, media, and technology.

=== Jerusalem Theatre ===
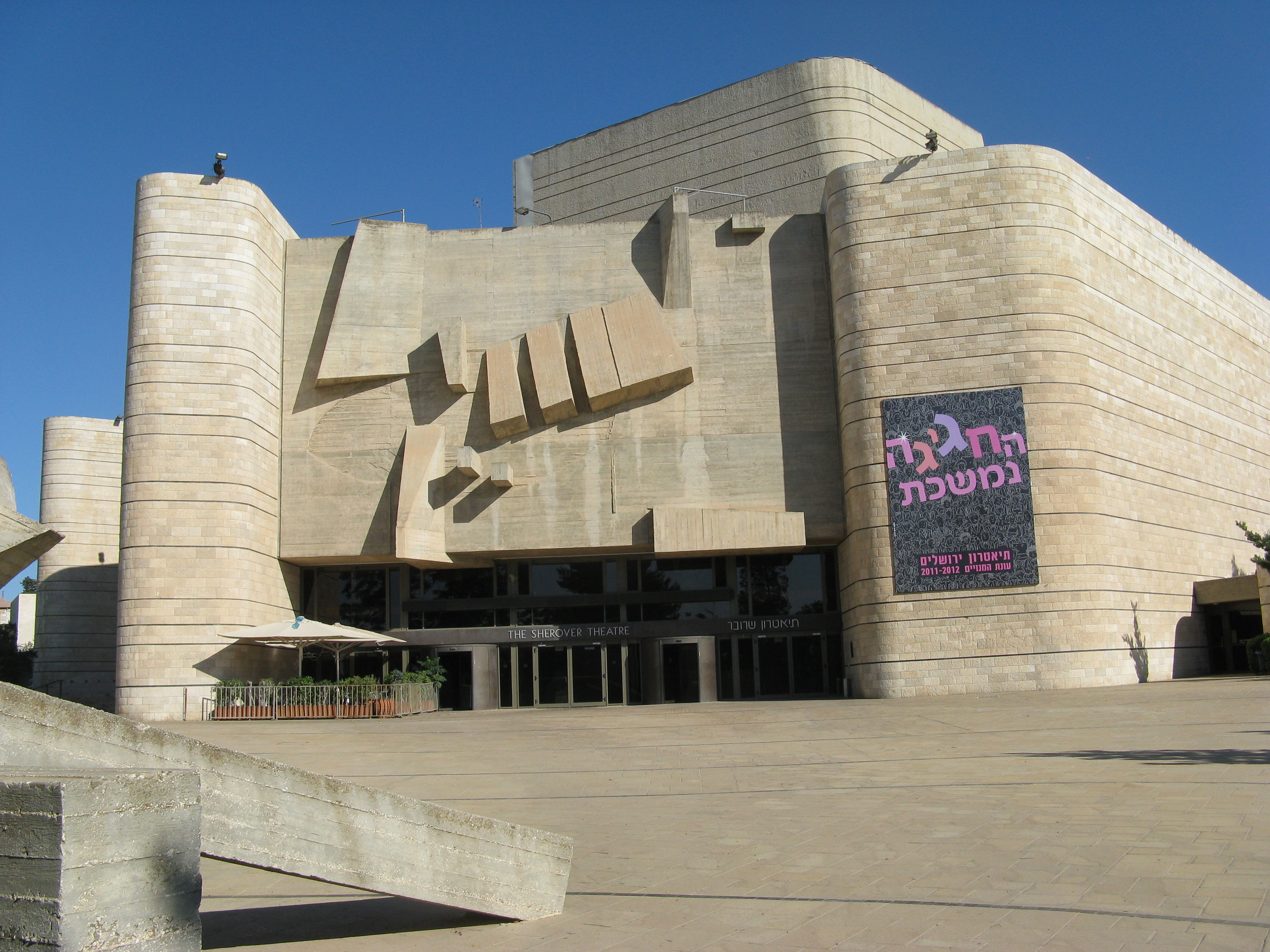
Jerusalem Theatre

The Jerusalem Theatre, also known as the Jerusalem Centre for the Performing Arts, is a prominent cultural venue featuring multiple performance spaces, including the Sherover Theatre, Henry Crown Symphony Hall, Rebecca Crown Auditorium, and the Little Theatre. Established in 1971, it serves as a hub for cultural events in the capital.

== Property dispute ==
Some lands in Talbiya are owned by the Greek Orthodox Patriarchate of Jerusalem. In August 2016 a group of investors, which was called "Nayot Komemiyut Investments", purchased 500 dunams from the Patriarch, while a part of it was in Talbiya. Formerly, the lands had been leased by the Jewish National Fund (JNF) and were subleased to Israeli tenants who registered their leasehold rights in the Land registration in Israel, but the revenue was not paid to the Patriarch by the JNF. It was one of the reasons of selling the lands by the Patriarch to "Nayot Komemiyut", which committed to collect the rents for the Patriarch, as it was stated in a verdict of the Jerusalem District Court.

Selling the areas to a third hand aside the Patriarchate of Jerusalem and the JNF, puts the Israeli tenants, which most of them are elderly, under an economic uncertainty, while their real estate's value goes down. Tenants cannot design plans of TAMA 38 The investors are also unable to construct or widen the buildings, because the land is still leased by the JNF for several decades. The tenants requested the Israeli government to nationalize the leased lands, or at least to compensate them in real terms for their acquires, which were equal to real estate values. The Patriarchate reacted by claiming that its property rights were offended. In the beginning of 2018, Jerusalem Municipality joined the Israeli Government and refused to release the lands overwhelmingly, claiming it had to evaluate every leased estate for its betterment levy. As a result, the Christian Church leaders closed the Church of the Holy Sepulchre to visitors during the end of February 2018.

== Notable residents ==
- Haim Yavin
- Edward Said
- Reuven Rivlin
- Ya'akov Ne'eman
- Martin Buber
- David Friedman

== See also ==
- Armstrong Institute of Biblical Archaeology, branch of the fundamentalist Philadelphia Church of God; at 1, David Marcus St. (Orde Wingate Square)
