= Mamuta Art and Research Center =

Art research center

Mamuta Art and Research Center is an independent center for art research, an artist residency, an artist-run exhibition space, and a publishing house in Jerusalem, Israel.

== History ==
The Mamuta Art Research Center was established in 2009 by artists and curators in Jerusalem. The Center was initially located in El-Dan House in Ein Kerem, one of Jerusalem suburbs. It moved to Hansen House in Jerusalem in 2012. The center is supported financially by Ostrovsky Family Fund.

== Notable projects and exhibitions ==
- 2014. An Exhibition by Chantal Akerman
- 2014. 'The Eternal Sukkah of the Jahalin tribe'.
- 2018. 'Intersections'. In collaboration with Jerusalem Film Festival.
- 2019 "Barbarians: a censorship archive". Jerusalem
- 2019. 'Veterans' by Lola Arias. In collaboration with Jerusalem Film Festival.
- 2019. 'Room 235: I Don’t Know If You Understand Me Correctly' by Gabi Kricheli, curated by Sagit Mezamer.
