= Jon Bernad =

American artist

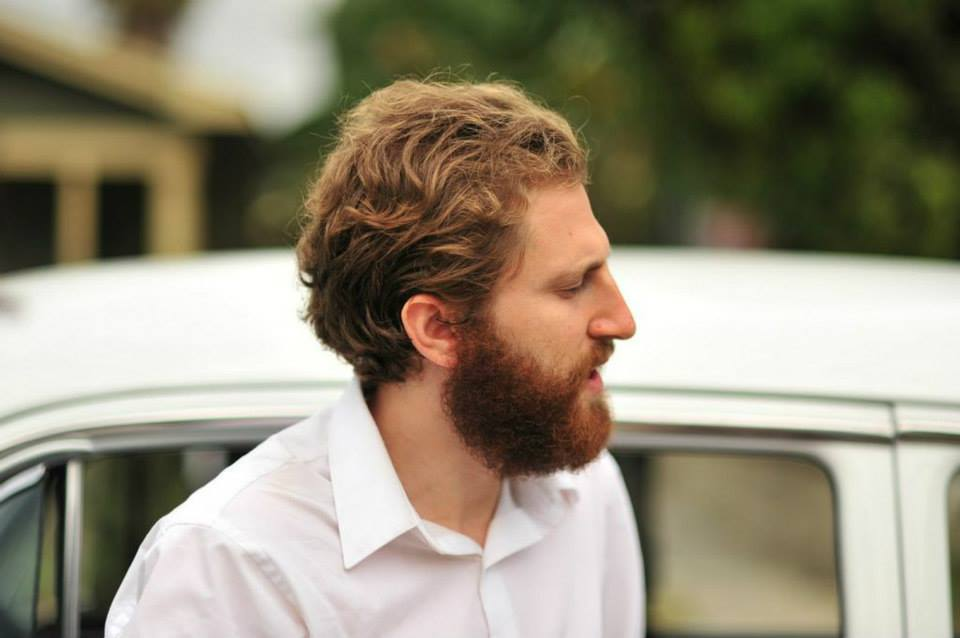
- Born: April 14, 1983 (age 41); Maryland, United States
- Known for: Life Art

Jonathan Bernad (born 1983) is an American artist who lives and works in Los Angeles, California. He is the brother of film and television producer David Bernad. Bernad frequently collaborates with travelers, arranging trips and introductions to create life experiences and larger narratives—his art work has been shown in exhibitions such as Here Is Elsewhere's "Ma Prochaine Vie," the Venice Art Walk, the Anne Barrault Gallery's "Destiny: The B's," the Ithuba Arts Fund's "An Experiment to Test the Destiny of the World," and Mains d'Oeuvres's show "Sans Vous, Rien Ne Se Fera." Some of Bernad's projects include flying a stranger from South Africa to drive across America, sending an L.A. artist to Paris to cook dinners for surprised locals, and photographing dogs who hang out with art.
