= Jonathan Yavin =

Israeli writer

- יונתן יבין
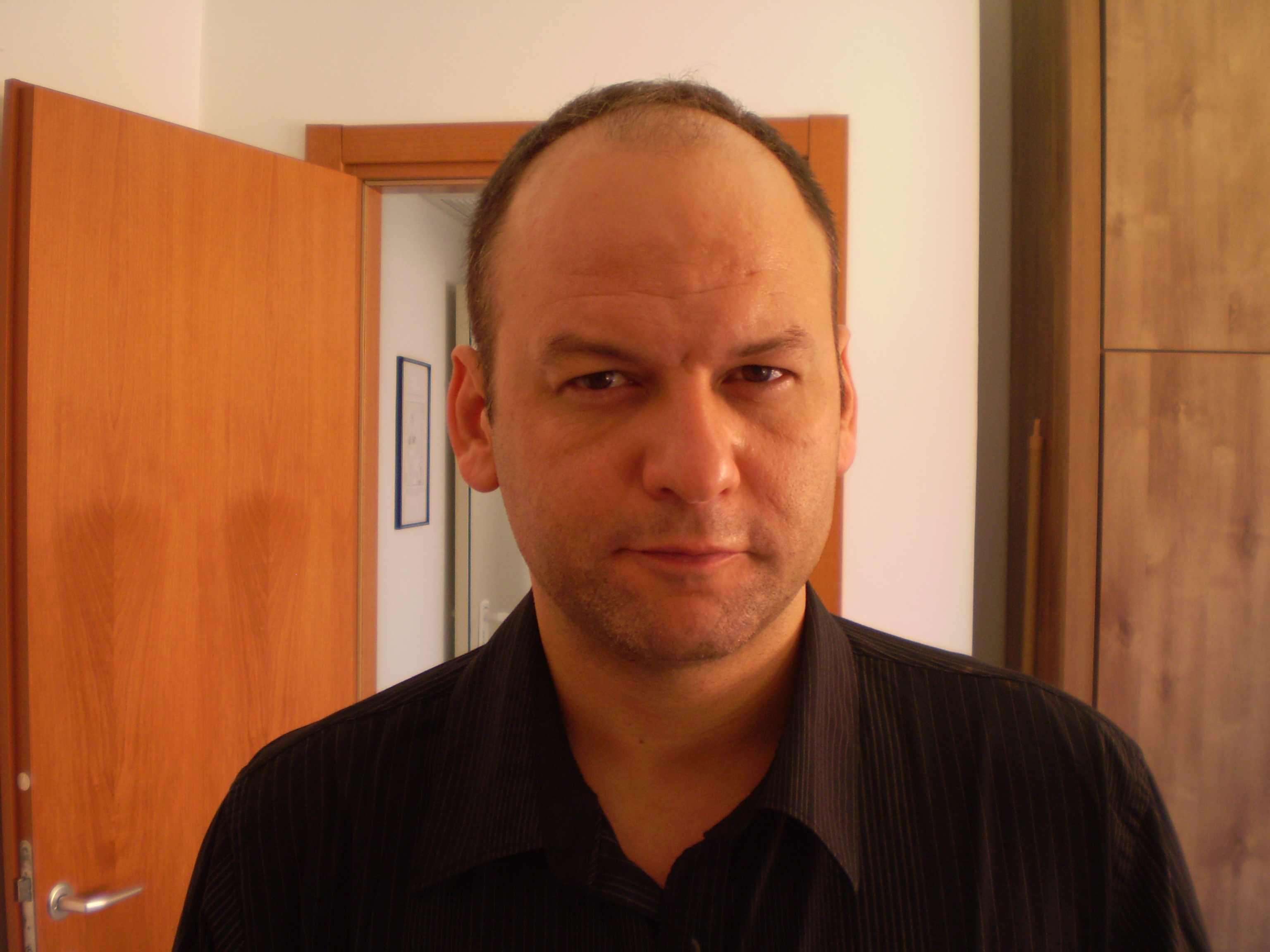
- Jonathan Yavin
- Born: June 17, 1972 (age 54); New York City, U.S.
- Occupation: Author

Jonathan (Yonatan) Yavin (Hebrew: יונתן יבין; born June 17, 1972), is an Israeli author of 18 books, for children, young adults and fiction. He is also a public speaker and lecturer, journalist, columnist, translator, op-ed writer and radio host. His books have been translated into English, Arabic, French, German, Chinese, Japanese, Croatian and Spanish. He is the recipient of the Israeli Prime Minister literary Award 2012. As journalist, he wrote mainly for Haaretz and Yedioth Ahronoth. In 2022 he became a publisher, having founded Mellel Publishing House.

== Biography ==
Yavin was born in New York City to renowned news anchorman Haim Yavin and wife Josepha, while his father was the Israeli TV correspondent in the US. When Jonathan was 3, his family returned to Israel. According to several interviews with him in Israeli press, he taught himself how to read and write at age 4 and started writing poems at age 6. At age 19 he began writing in local newspapers in Jerusalem. During his twenties he worked as a journalist in local media and as a copywriter in advertising agencies in Jerusalem, while studying for his bachelor's degree in philosophy and comparative literature at The Hebrew University. In 2001 Jonathan moved to Tel-Aviv and began writing for Ha'aretz national newspaper. At the same time he was writing his debut novel, Baba Gee, and while in the making, Yavin published his debut children's book, When I grow up... ("Haci Ha'yiti Rotze Lihyot", 2002, co-written with Nevo Ziv). The book is a lexicon of professions and is written in a comic and down-to-earth manner. Like all Yavin's children's books, it's rhymed. It was well received, reprinted over 10 times and is still widely sold.

His 2nd children book, Pumpkin the Kitten (He'chatool Dla'at) had major commercial success: It was voted for the Israeli board of Education "Book Parade" both for kindergartens and grades 1–3, translated into Arabic by the Centre for the Arab Child's Literature in Israel and was included in the board of Education's "Bookshelf" initiative, thus distributed in over 50,000 copies to schools and kindergartens in the country. This earned Pumpkin the Kitten a "Platinum Book" certification, issued by the Israel Book Association. In 2019 this book was selected for the PJ Library program in Israel and was distributed in over 140,000 additional copies, bringing total sales to over 210 thousand copies. In April 2023 it was published in English, alongside another one of Yavin's children's books: A Night at the Playground. In November 2023 it was published in Croatian. In May 2024 Jonathan Yavin published his most recent children's book, Rona's Moving Out, about a girl who decides to look for a better family and tries living at her upstairs neighbour's.

Yavin's debut fiction novel, Baba Gee, was published in June 2004. The protagonist is a 28 year old photographer named Nadav, who feels lost and goes on a trip to India. His father, a playboy CEO named Eli, decides to join him. The book was well received by critics and audience alike and optioned twice for the cinema, but was never produced as a film. Yavin's 2nd novel, House-Sitter (Shemar-Bait, 2011) was key to his acclaim. It was written in a mix of biblical and 18th–19th-20th century Hebrew, was praised by prominent authors David Grossman, Haim Be'er, A. B. Yehoshua and Aharon Meged and following its publication, earned Yavin the Prime Minister Literary Award for Literature 2012. Following this novel came The Misanthropist, a comic thriller taking place in the Tel-Aviv theater scene and Loyal to None but Himself, in which a deafening radio star is fired from his station and gets involved with a forensics expert and his mysterious wife. This novel was received exceptionally well, critics describing it as "brilliant", "an upbeat, sexy and funny entertainment" and "a spicey story, extremely well-built".

As translator from English into Hebrew, Yavin translated such books as "Tarzan of the Apes" by Edgar Rice Burroughs, "Three Men in a Boat" by Jerome K. Jerome, "Spinky Sulks" by William Stieg, "Sleepy, the Goodnight Buddy" by Drew Daywalt and others.

He currently lives in Ramat Gan (greater Tel-Aviv area) with his wife Ravit and his three children.

== Publications ==
=== Books ===
- When I Grow Up... (Hachi Ha'iti Rotze Lihiot). Am Oved Publishing house, 2002, children's book.
- Pumpkin the Kitten (He-Chatool Dela'at Meshane et Ha-Da'at). Am-Oved Publishing house, 2004, children's book. Reached Platinum.
- Baba Gee (Baba Gee). Am-Oved Publishing house, 2004, fiction novel.
- Oh Brother (Achla Ach) Am-Oved Publishing house, 2006, children's book. Illustrator Gilad Soffer won the Israel Museum's Ben Yitzhak award for children's literature illustration
- Zehavim (Zehavim). Am-Oved Publishing house, 2006, young adult fiction novel.
- When Dad Was Sad (Kshe Aba Haya Atzuv), Am-Oved Publishing house, 2008, children's book.
- In the Neighbourhood (Baschoona Shelanoo). Am-Oved Publishing house, 2010, children's book.
- Anti (Anti). Am-Oved Publishing house, 2010, young adult fiction novel.
- House-Sitter (Shemar Ba'it). Am-Oved Publishing house, 2011, fiction novel.
- Building a Story - The Architecture of writing (Bonim Sipur). Kinneret-Zemora-Bitan Publishers, 2012, writer's guide.
- Dori the Dragon (Doron Ha-Derakon). Am-Oved Publishing house, 2013, children's book.
- The Misanthropist (Ha-Mizanthrop). Kinneret-Zemora-Bitan Publishers, 2014, fiction novel.
- King Leo Retires (Ha-Melech Ahral'e Poresh). Kinneret-Zemora-Bitan Publishers, 2015, children's book. Revised and reprinted in 2025 in Mellel Publishing House.
- Love vs. Friendship (Ahava Neged Haveroot (Yedioth Sefarim Publishers, 2017, young adult fiction novel.
- Cockatoo Hairdo (Gozalim Ba-Rosh"). Am-Oved Publishing house, 2017, children's book.
- A Night at the Playground (Layla Bagina). Am-Oved Publishing house, 2021, children's book.
- Loyal to None but Himself (Ne'eman Le'atzmo). Mellel Publishing House, 2022, fiction novel.
- Rona's Moving Out (Rona Overet Mishpacha). Mellel Publishing House, 2024, children's book.
- King Leo Retires (Ha-Melech Ahral'e Poresh) - revised edition. Mellel Publishing House, 2025, children's book.
- Building a Story - The Architecture of writing (Bonim Sipur) - A revised edition. Mellel Publishing House, 2025, writer's guide.

== Links ==
- Jonathan Yavin's official site.
- Jonathan Yavin's page on Facebook.
- Jonathan Yavin's page on The Institute for the Translation of Hebrew Literature (ITHL).
- Jonathan Yavin's author page in Assia literary agency.
