= Haim Yavin =

Israeli film director (1932–2026)

- חַיִּים יָבִין
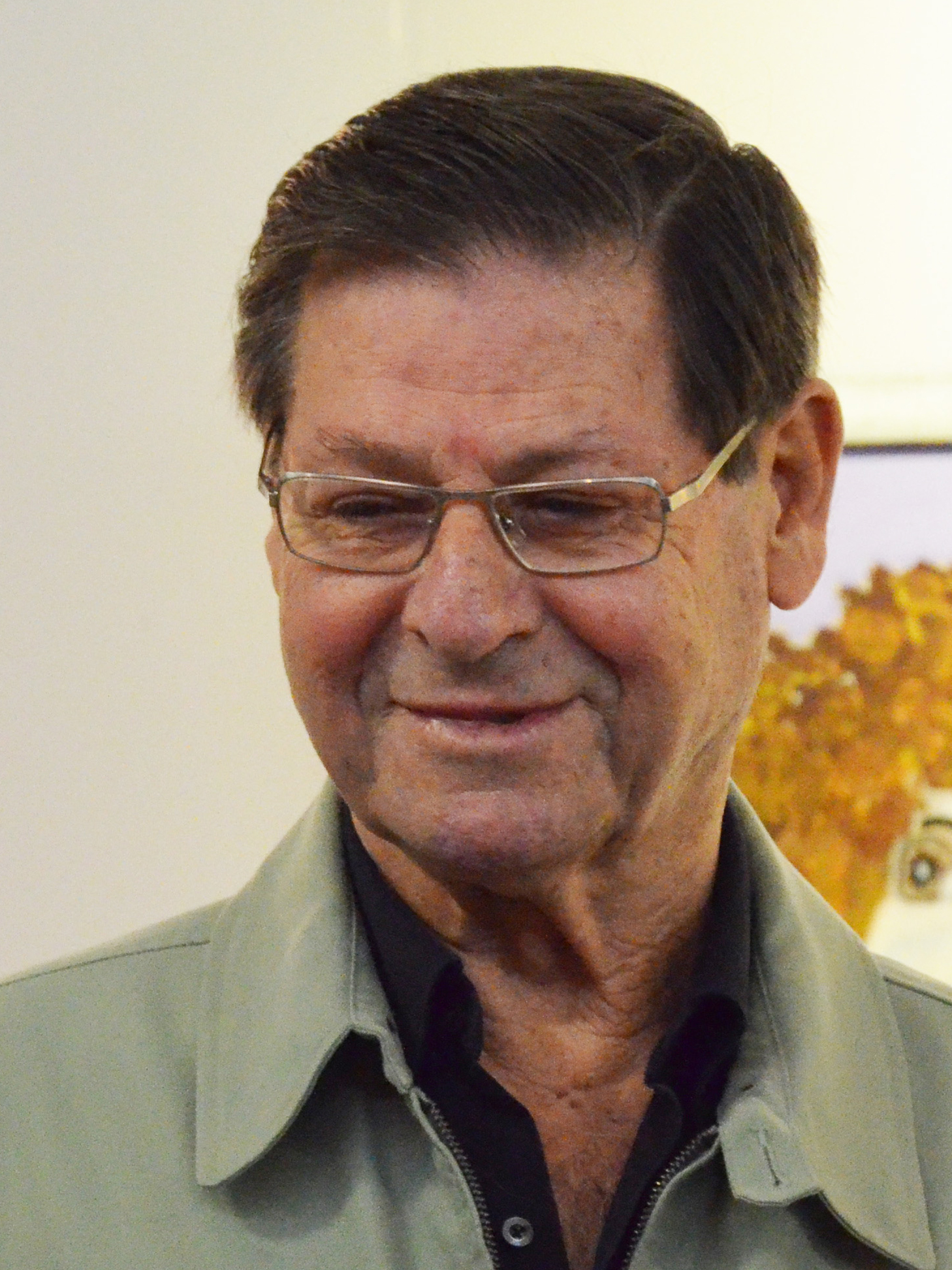
- Yavin in 2013
- Born: Heinz Kluger; 10 September 1932; Beuthen, Upper Silesia, Prussia, Germany (now Bytom, Poland)
- Died: 22 July 2026 (aged 93)
- Citizenship: Israeli
- Occupation: News presenter
- Awards: 1997 Israel Prize

Haim Yavin (Hebrew: חַיִּים יָבִין, romanized: Hayyim Yavin; 10 September 1932 – 22 July 2026) was an Israeli television anchor and documentary filmmaker. He was one of Israel's leading news presenters, associated with the job for so many decades that he was known in Israel as "Mr. Television".

== Early life and education ==
Heinz Kluger (later Haim Yavin) was born on 10 September 1932, in Beuthen, Upper Silesia, Prussia, Germany (now Bytom, Poland). His family immigrated to Mandatory Palestine in 1933, settling in Kiryat Bialik. Their original surname "Kluger", which in German means "clever one", was later Hebraized to Yavin (Hebrew: יָבִין), meaning "will understand". The rest of his family was killed at the Auschwitz concentration camp during the Holocaust. Yavin went to high school in Kiryat Motzkin, but moved to Haifa before graduating to work at the Phoenicia glass factory. After mandatory military service and completing his matriculation exams, he studied English and Hebrew literature at the Hebrew University of Jerusalem.

== Media career ==
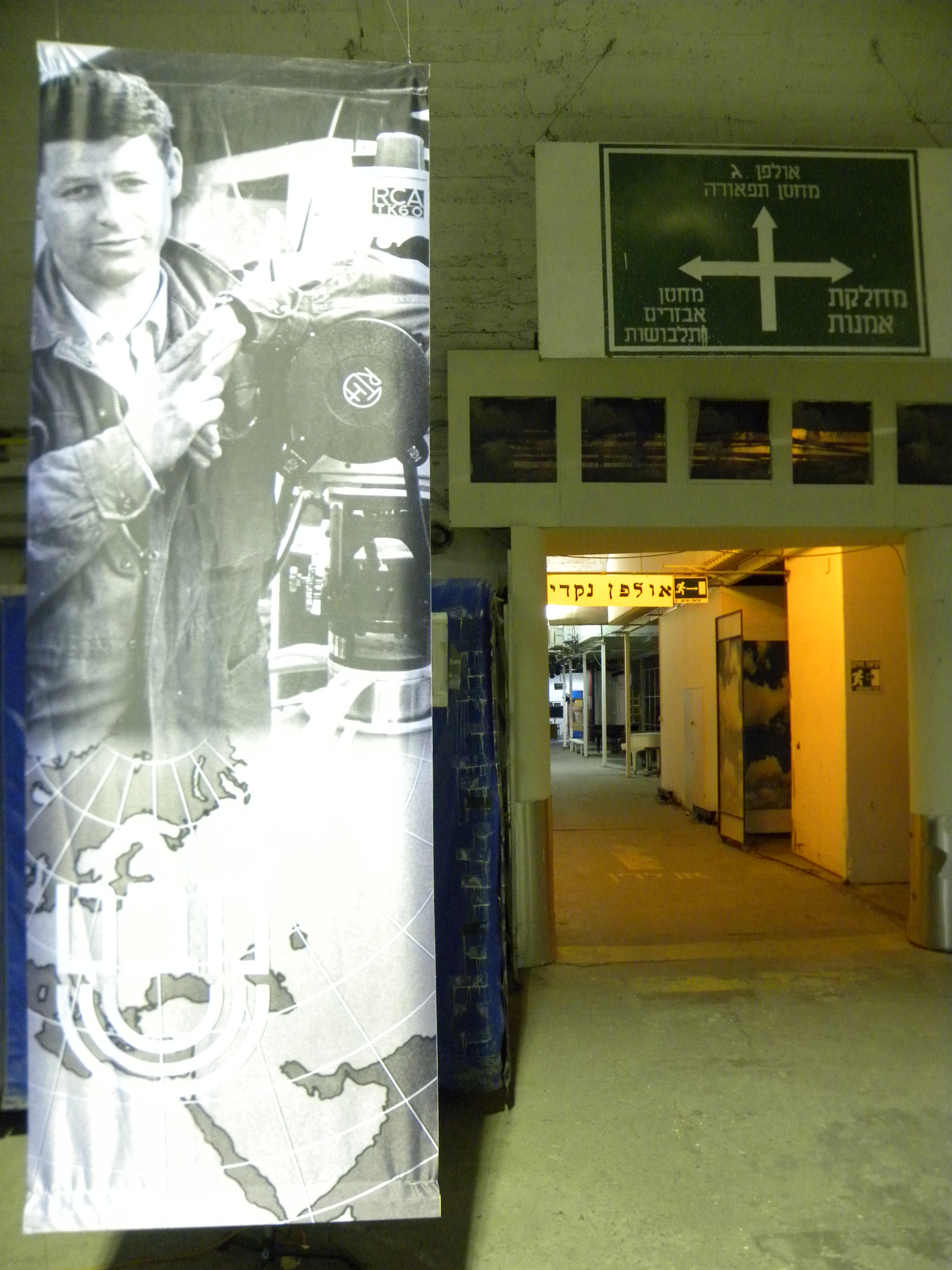
A poster showing Haim Yavin at work is displayed at the entrance to IBA's Channel 1 news studio

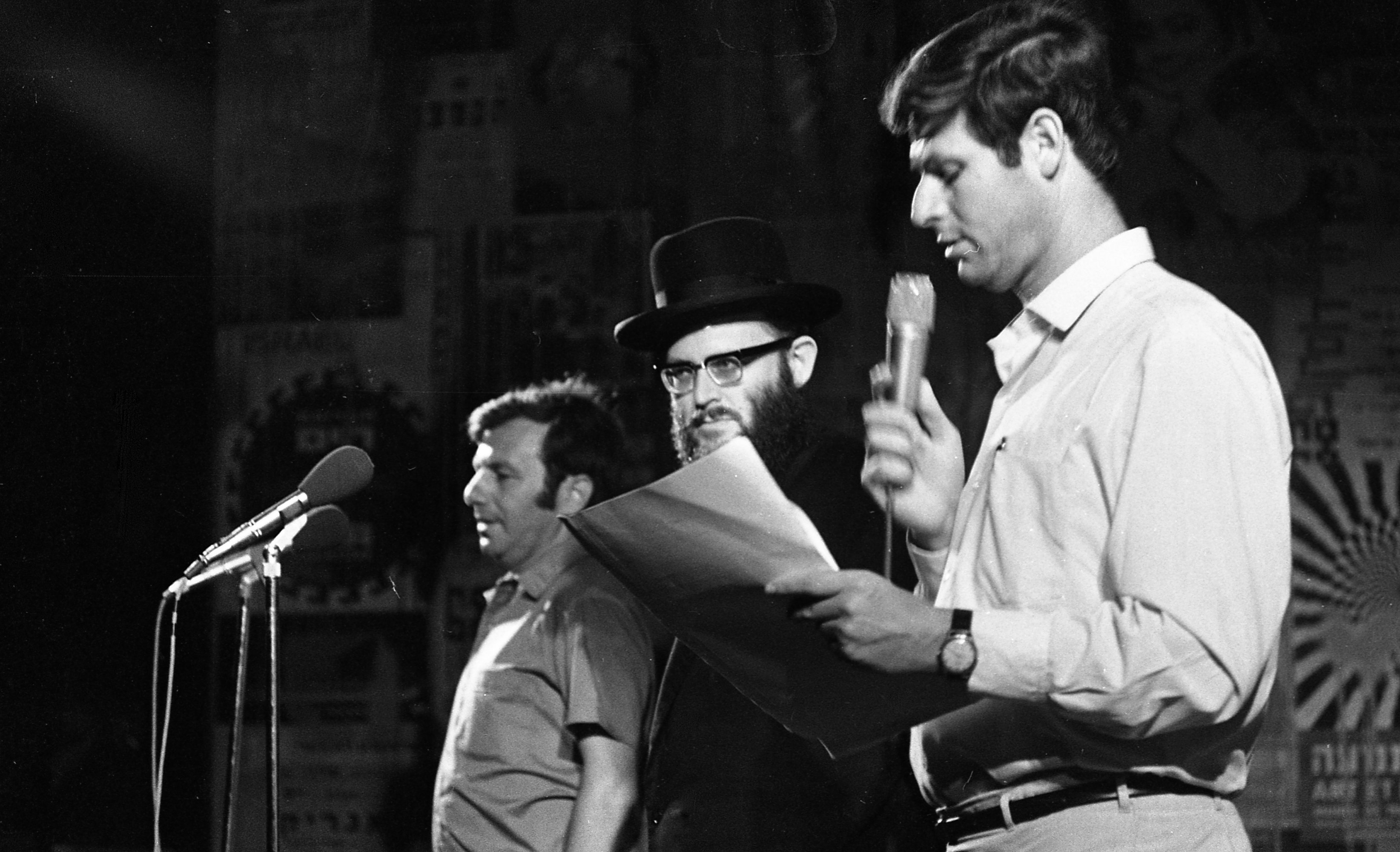
Yavin interviewing Yisrael Galili in an IDF base as part of the Israeli TV show Kaleidoscope on 16 July 1969.

In 1958, while studying at the Hebrew University of Jerusalem, he worked as an anchor and music presenter for the Kol Yisrael radio station. After founding the radio service Hagel Hakal (later known as Reshet Bet), he joined Kol Yisrael's documentary department, where he remained until the establishment of Channel 1, the first television channel in Israel.

Between 1968 and 2008, Yavin was the anchor of Mabat (lit. "Outlook"), the primetime news roundup on Israel's state television station, Channel 1, which he helped found. On 23 July, he was part of the team that presented Mabat's first episode and Israel's first news broadcast, which centered on the hijacking of El Al Flight 426. He later served as the Israel Broadcasting Authority's correspondent in the United States from 1971 to 1974. Haaretz described his failure to cover Richard Nixon's resignation speech as possibly the "greatest blunder of his career."

When he returned to Israel, he was appointed chief editor of Mabat, head of its news department, and presenter and editor of Mabat Sheni. Yavin also produced documentaries on topics from domestic politics to Judaism in the Soviet Union. One of his documentaries, "A Smoldering Ember," involved travel to the Soviet Union in its final days.

Yavin became a leading figure on Israeli television, earning the nickname "Mr. Television." He was dubbed "Israel's Walter Cronkite" in the U.S. press. His coverage of the 1977 Israel elections marked the first time exit polls were broadcast live on Israeli television. After the electoral victory of Menachem Begin's Likud, Yavin coined the Hebrew phrase "mahapach" (Hebrew: מַהְפֵּךְ, with his legendary announcement: "Ladies and gentlemen – a turnabout!" (Hebrew: "גְּבִירוֹתַי וְרַבּוֹתַי – מַהְפֵּךְ!", romanized: "gvirotai verabotai – mahapach!"). It would go on to receive widespread usage outside of Israeli politics, including in sports.

From 1986 to 1990, he served as the director of Israeli Television, during which he produced over 100 documentaries. His tenure saw the extension of broadcasting hours and the establishment of programs such as Beshidur Hoker, Roim Olam, and Siba LaMesiba. He described his announcement of the 1995 assassination of prime minister Yitzhak Rabin as the most difficult moment of his career, stating in an interview that: "I couldn't say the word 'dead' or 'murdered'. I just said he was no longer with us."

Yavin sparked political controversy with his five-part documentary series The Land of the Settlers, aired on Israel's Channel 2 in May 2005. The program concluded that Israeli settlements were endangering Israel, and Israel should withdraw from the West Bank and Gaza Strip, with Yavin stating that "since 1967, [the Israelis] have been brutal conquerors, occupiers, suppressing another people." At the time, Ariel Sharon's disengagement plan had not yet been implemented, and the series was viewed as propaganda in support of it. The chairman of the Yesha Council, Benzi Lieberman, called on Channel One to fire Yavin, saying "his continued serving in the objective newscaster's position constitutes a blow to media ethics and professional integrity". Instead, the Israel Broadcasting Authority signed him on for another year.

In August 2007, Yavin announced his retirement. He read the news for the last time on 5 February 2008.

== Personal life and death ==
After marrying Yosefa, he lived with her in Jerusalem's Talbiya neighborhood. They lived in Tel Aviv. They had three sons, including author Jonathan Yavin, and a daughter who died in 2025.

In 2016 and 2017, four women, including Haaretz journalist Neri Livneh, accused him of sexual assault, allegations he denied.

Yavin died on 22 July 2026, at the age of 93. His funeral was held at Givat HaShlosha cemetery on 24 July.

== Awards ==
In 1997, Yavin was awarded the Israel Prize for communications. In 2003, he became the first recipient of the Israeli Academy of Film and Television's Lifetime Achievement Award. In 2009, he was awarded an honorary doctorate from Ben-Gurion University of the Negev.

== See also ==
- 1977 Israeli legislative election
- List of Israel Prize recipients
- Mabat LaHadashot (Mabat news show)
