= Public Movement =

Israeli performance art group

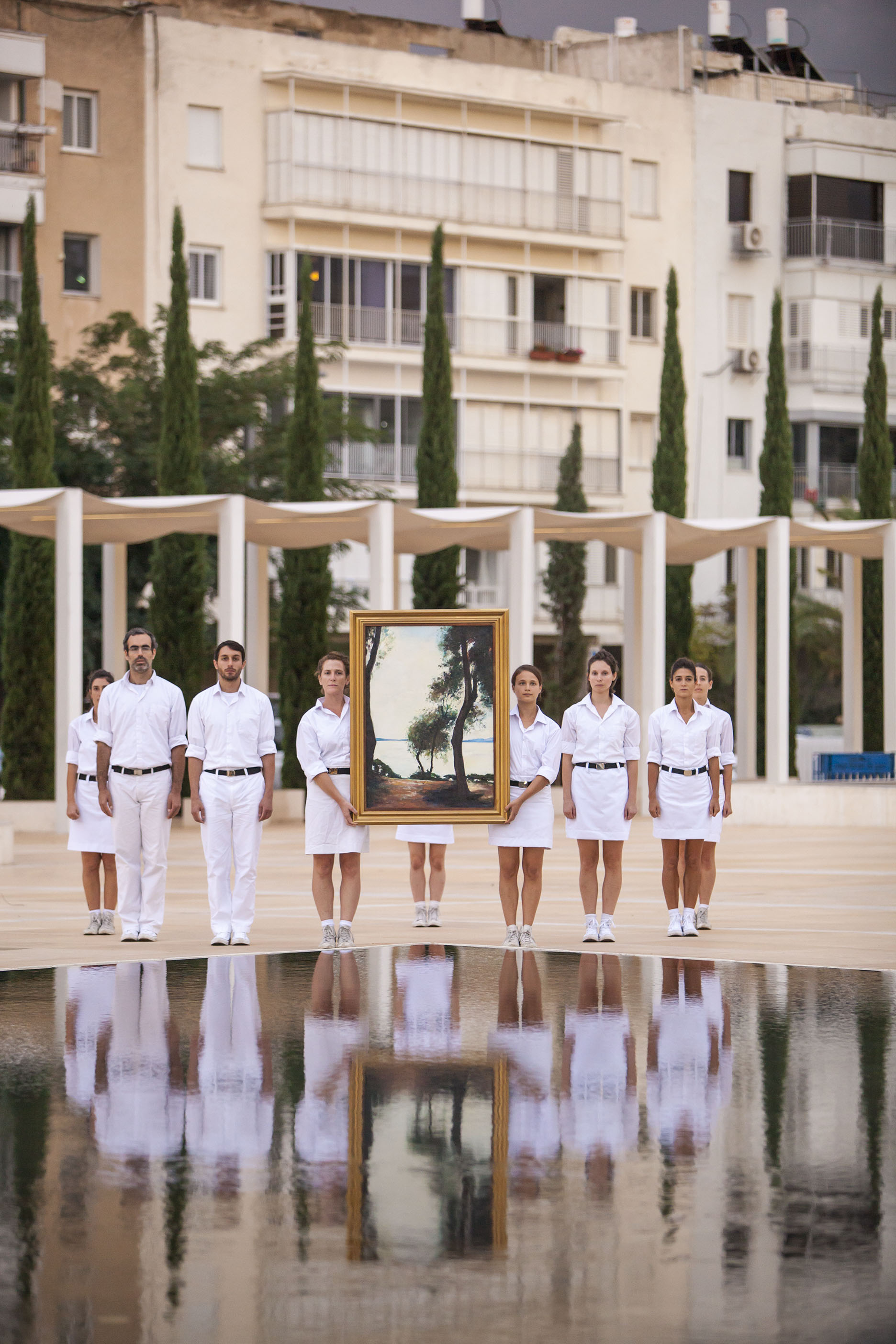
Public Movement in the opening day of the group's solo exhibition, National Collection (Tel Aviv Museum of Art, 2015)

Public Movement is a performative research group based in Tel Aviv. Since it was established in 2006, Public Movement has worked on a variety of performative actions such as events, rituals, ceremonies, and political actions. The group performs focused-actions that explore the issues, ideas and dynamics of public spaces. Many of their works are created in collaboration with scholars and experts in fields outside of the arts. In many cases, these collaborations have furthered debate and discussion about contemporary issues surrounding Public Movement's actions. Public Movement was co-founded in 2006 by Omer Kreiger and Dana Yahalomi. In 2011, Yahalomi assumed sole leadership of the group.

== Significant actions ==
=== Spring in Warsaw (2009) ===
Spring in Warsaw was an urban walk along a route in a rare site of civil pilgrimage. Public Movement members, together with Polish collaborators, led a walk in the Warsaw Ghetto, in the footsteps of Israeli and Jewish youth delegations which visit the city every spring. The Public was gathered in the Umschlagplatz at 18:00, marched and participated in rituals along a route which included the Ghetto Uprising command bunker on 18 Mila Street, The house in which Ludwik Zamenhof who invented Esperanto had lived, and the Memorial of German Chancellor Willy Brandt's 1970 kneeling. The closing ceremony took place at Nathan Rapoport's Monument to the Ghetto Heroes, with the laying of a Public Movement wreath, a speech and a dance for the Rapoport memorial.

=== University Exercise (2010) ===
University Exercise was an organized occupied led by Public Movement of Heidelberg University main building and University Square. In collaboration with 16 special unit policemen from the Heidelberg Police, and 40 firefighters from the Heidelberg Fire brigades and volunteers, Public Movement organized a public behavior drill, an examination of citizenship. Screening process at the university entrance including physical checks and a seating plan, a procedure in a lecture hall, police questioning in the hallway, police arrests, a demonstration and an emergency evacuation drill led by the fire brigades, which led to a street party on University Square.

=== Debriefing Session (2012) ===
Debriefing Session is a series of private, one-on-one meetings that reveal information about negotiation that occurred during the planning and executing of the project, SALONS: Birthright Palestine?. Public Movement negotiated with a variety of different figures and organizations for SALONS: Birthright Palestine?. In preparation for the action, Public Movement Agents gather extensive research, much of which ended up in the cutting room in moments where the information is "volatile, sensitive or the quantity is too unwieldy to translate into physical movements, the material remains in the background."

Debriefing Session shares the “transitional moment between research and action,” inviting the listeners to understand themselves as stakeholders in the greater action and “turning members of the public into future agents.” The project was created by Alhena Katsof and Dana Yahalomi. This performative action was also the subject of a book, “Solution 263: Double Agent,” which was published by Sternberg Press in 2015. Debriefing Session was altered and performed many subsequent times, including at the Solomon R. Guggenheim Museum for Debriefing Session II.

=== SALONS: Birthright Palestine? (2012) ===
SALONS: Birthright Palestine? was a performative event that consisted of five different sessions, or “SALONS.” Each SALON was modeled after a different type of public debate setting and was hosted in multiple different venues. The public debates were modeled after “congressional sessions, summit meetings, visioning sessions, diplomatic consultations, secret gatherings, and demonstrations.” The five different SALONS all focused on the phenomenon of Birthright Israel and pushed viewers to question the ideas of diaspora, nationhood, and the right to return. These events were performed as a part of the New Museum’s 2012 Triennial and brought international attention to Public Movement. SALONS: Birthright Palestine? was Public Movement’s debut work in the United States

=== Rebranding European Muslims ― Gala (2012) ===
Rebranding European Muslims was a campaign that began at the 2012 Berlin Biennial and was continued at a Gala event in Graz. The mission behind this action was to question and investigate conflict surrounding Islam in Europe. To perform this investigation, Public Movement assigned three branding agencies the task of ‘re-branding’ European Muslims, alongside the notion that "Branding is doomed to fail, since there is always an unbearable and unbridgeable gap between the image and the reality, between a signifier and a signified". The three branding agencies that participated were, Demner, Merlicek & Bergmann; Love Tensta; and Metahaven. Each proposal was presented in front of a live audience and the winner was voted on by these audience members. The winning brand agency of the campaign was Demner, Merlicek & Bergmann. The winner was then granted billboard space throughout Graz to showcase their branding campaign.

=== Honor Guard (2013) ===
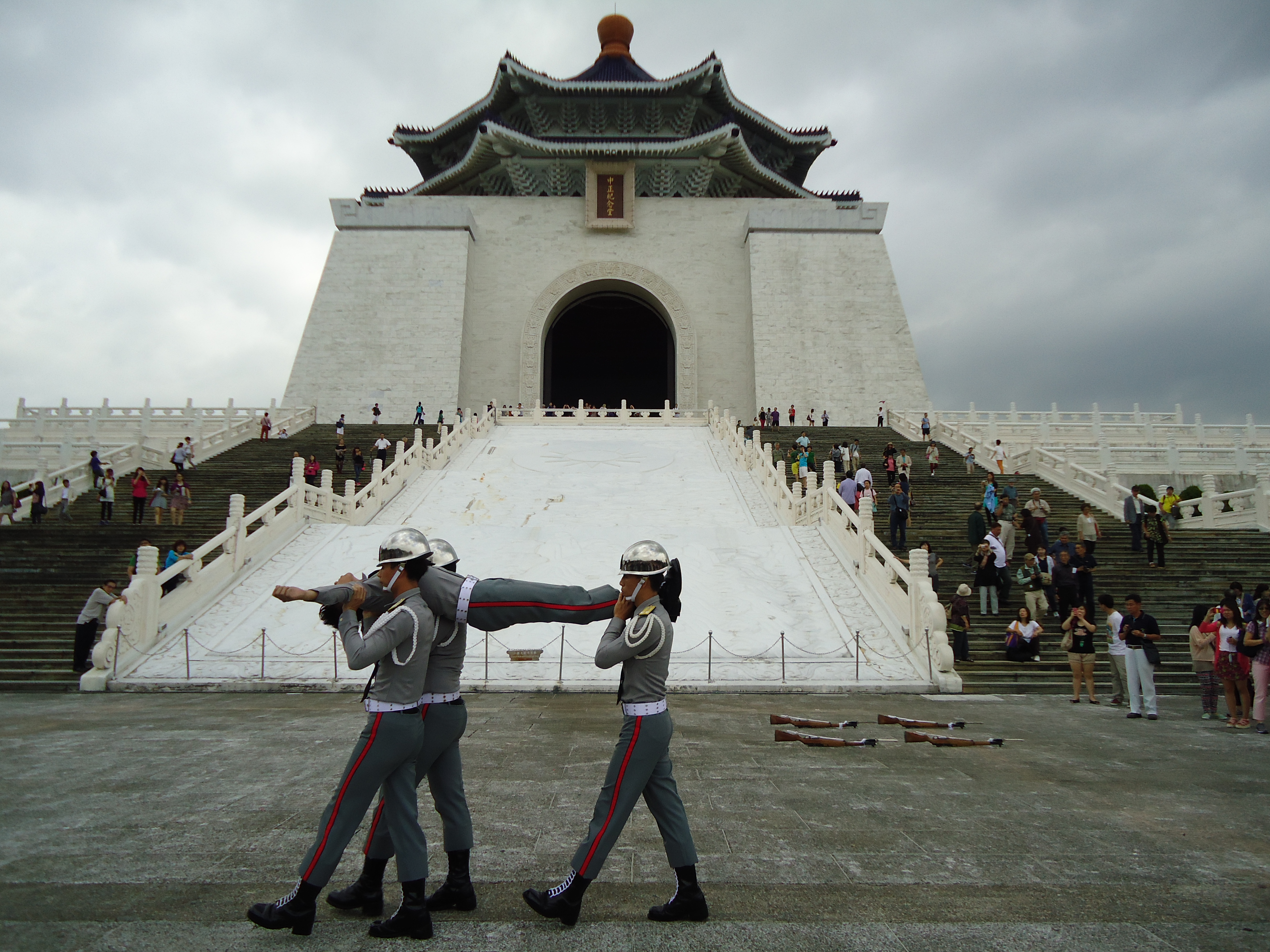
The Honor Guard of R.O.C Veterans performing Honor Guard, created by Public Movement, at the Chiang Kai-Shek Memorial Hall in Taipei, Taiwan (2013)

An honor guard, or ceremonial guard, is a ceremonial unit, usually military in nature. Public Movement, with the Veterans Honor Guard of R.O.C. held a weekly ceremonial performance at the Chiang Kai-Shek Memorial Hall in Taipei, Taiwan. This performance was shown to the public throughout the Asian Art Biennial. The audience members were encouraged to use this performance as a means of connecting to and exploring the history and future of Taiwan - a nation free of international recognition, that can thus dance its unspoken trauma, myth and heritage, examine the notion of independence, and acknowledge its violence and unity. Honor Guard was Public Movement's first action in East Asia.

=== Debriefing Session II (2016) ===
Debriefing Session II was a second showcasing of Public Movement's one-on-one performative methodology, that was also created by Alhena Katsof and Dana Yahalomi. This rendering was performed at the Solomon R. Guggenheim Foundation as a part of But a Storm Is Blowing from Paradise: Contemporary Art of the Middle East and North Africa, and at the Tel Aviv Museum of Art, as part of the group's solo exhibition, National Collection. Public Movement invited visitors to meet with an agent who delivers an account of its research about modern art made in Palestine before 1948. The private session draws out the performative relationship between nation-states and their cultural institutions.

=== Choreographies of Power (2016) ===
Choreographies of Power was an action commissioned as a public program for the Solomon R. Guggenheim Foundation's But a Storm Is Blowing from Paradise: Contemporary Art of the Middle East and North Africa. This 30-minute procession through the Guggenheim's collection galleries incorporated elements from the Guggenheim's history to explore different aspects of the collection's hidden political tools. As part of the procession, performers “enacted ceremonies, physical encounters, short speeches, and moments of violence.” These specific actions were used to shed light on the complicated reciprocal relationship of the museum spaces and political spaces. It was researched and developed by Public Movement during a mini-residency exploring the collections and archives of the Solomon R. Guggenheim Museum, and in a studio residency at Outset Contemporary Art Fund, Tel Aviv.

== Exhibitions ==
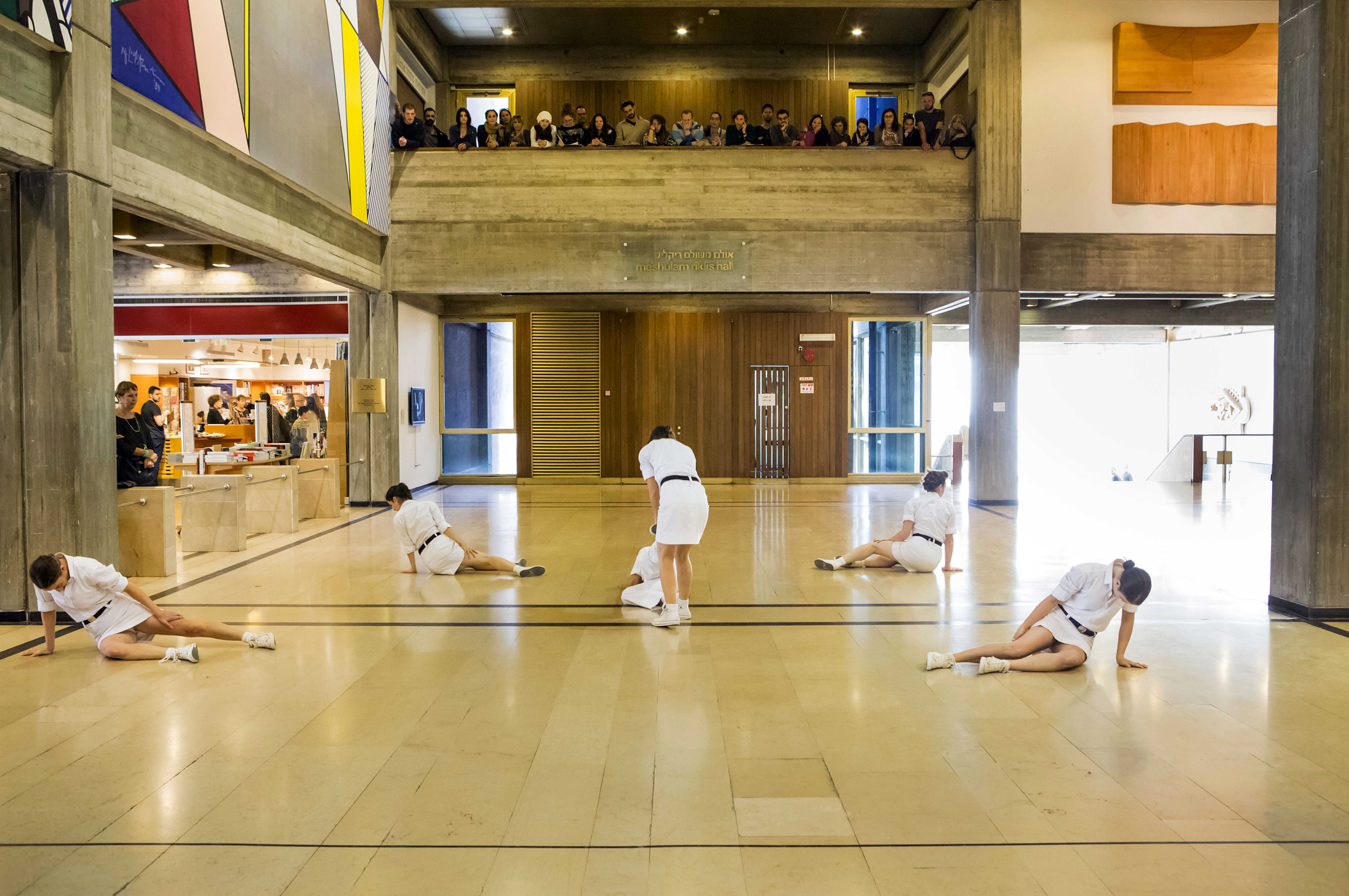
Public Movement performing National Collection in the Tel Aviv Museum of Art, 2015

=== National Collection (2015) ===
National Collection was Public Movement's first museum exhibition and the first of its kind in Israel. The exhibition was of a series of performances that were shown in the Tel Aviv Museum of art for a period of six weeks. The main focus of this exhibition was to re-align the viewer's ideas of what a museum is and what the museum space can mean. Public Movement used choreography to understand the museum as a place of re-evaluating a person's cultural and national identities. By making use of the museum's own works, histories, and assumed behavioral codes, Public Movement pushed viewers to think twice about a museum's allegedly-neutral relationship with political regimes.

== Press ==
=== Solution 263: Double Agent (2016) ===
Solution 263: Double Agent is a book authored by Alhena Katsof, Director of Strategy and Protocol, and Dana Yahalomi, director of Public Movement. The book is a collection of information and instructions needed to perform Debriefing Sessions. It explores the relationship between “the state and its cultural institutions,” which is a core driving force behind many of Public Movement's actions.
