= Hansen House (Jerusalem) =

Center for design, media, and technology and former leprosy asylum in Jerusalem

Coordinates: 31.767722°N 35.216923°E

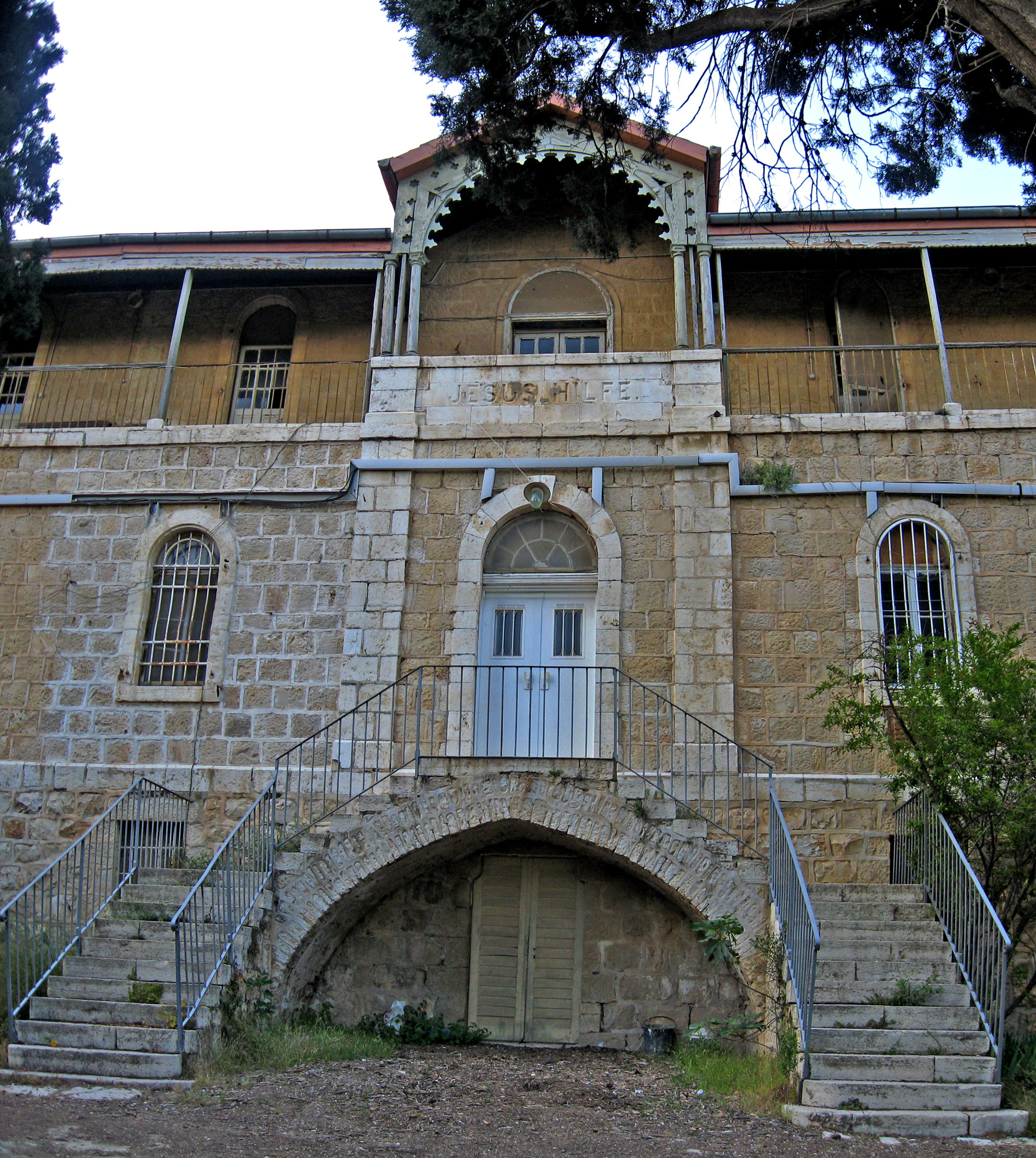

Hansen House (Beit Hansen) is a historic building in the Talbiya neighborhood of Jerusalem, Israel established in 1887 as a leprosy hospital known as "Jesus-Hilfe" ('The Help of Jesus') in German, a name still visible on the façade.

Today, the compound houses the branch of the Bezalel Academy of Arts and Design for master's degree studies in design, the Jerusalem Film and Television Project, and the editorial office of Erev Rav, a magazine focusing on contemporary art. The permanent historical exhibition, Behind the Wall, continues to present the story of the original hospital, and the courtyard hosts summer music performances and film screenings. Additionally, the compound includes the cafe operated by Meshek Ofaim and “HaDir,” a bar that opens in the evenings. Every year, Hansen House hosts Design Week in collaboration with artists and creators from Israel around a unified theme.

== History ==
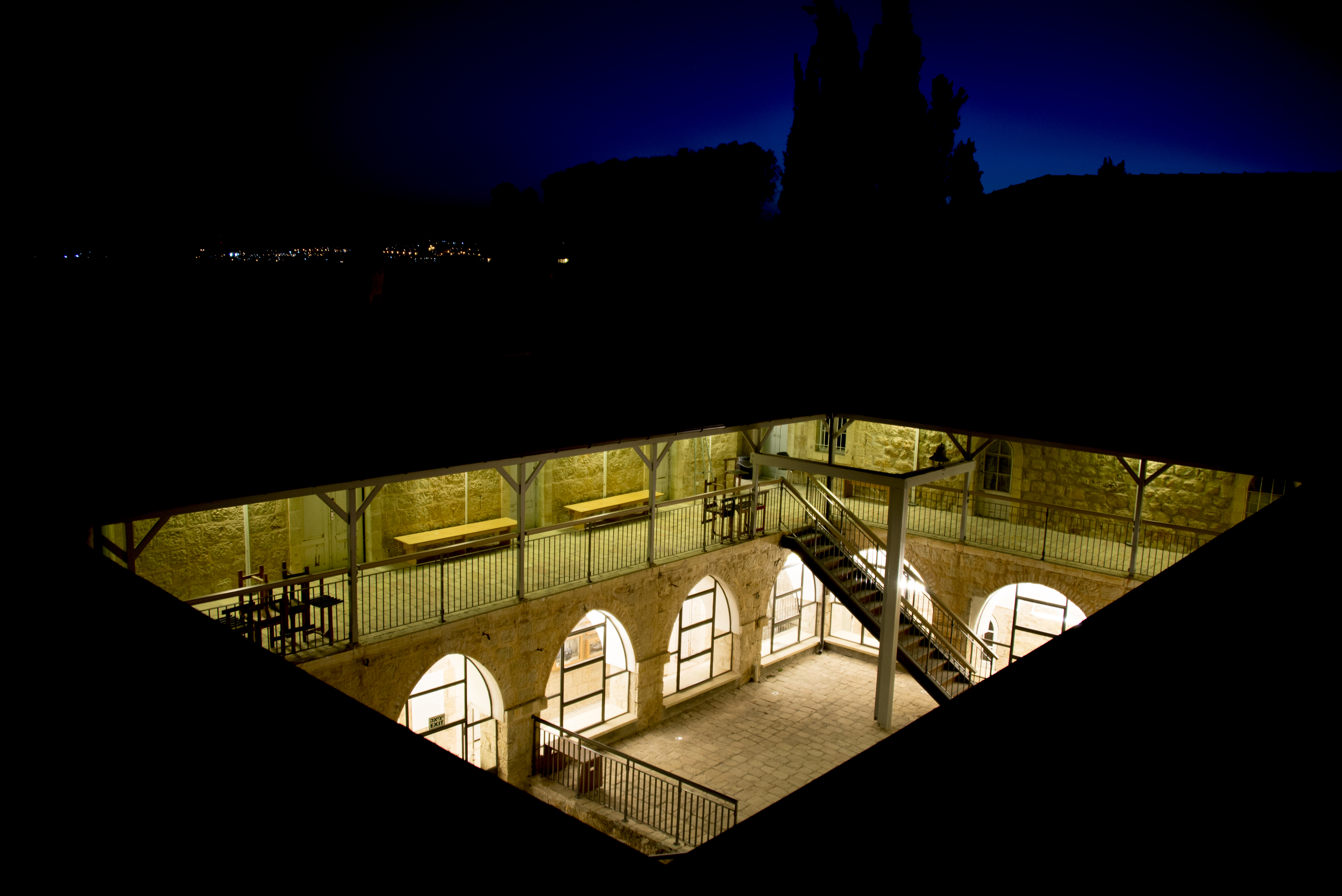
Hansen House from above

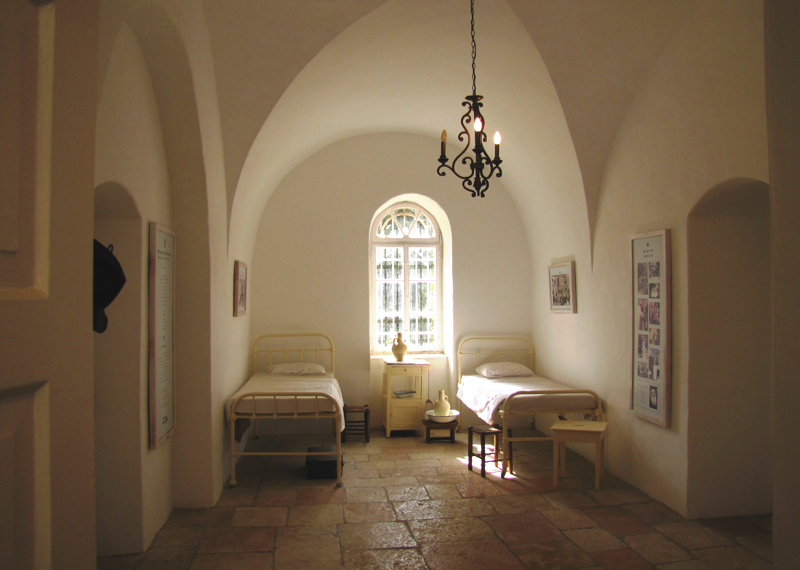

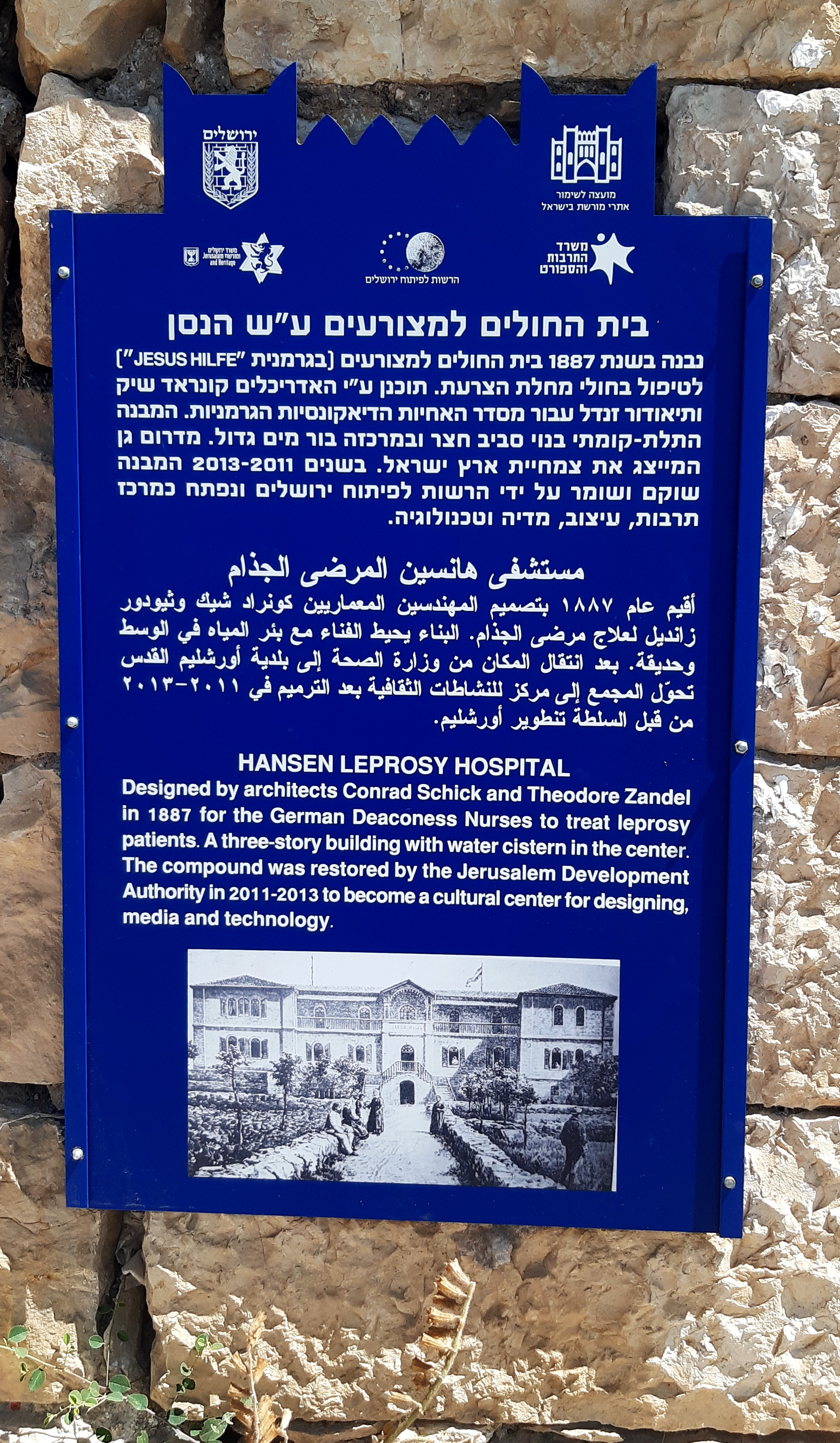
Council for Conservation of Heritage Sites on Hansen House

In 1887, when the old lepers' asylum in Mamilla on Rehov Agron 20, donated in 1867 by Baroness Auguste von Keffenbrinck-Ascheraden (1835–1889) from Keffenbrink became overcrowded, Jerusalem's Anglican-German Protestant community initiated the establishment of a larger facility designed by German architect Conrad Schick. Construction began in 1874 and included the building of a surrounding wall, a basement level, and a large water cistern. The building, surrounded by a high stone wall, was established in an isolated spot northwest of the German Colony with the name of the institution, Jesus-Hilfe (Jesus's Help), inscribed on a lintel on the main façade. The Herrnhut Brethren, the German branch of the Moravian Church, was responsible for fundraising and management. An innovative feature of the building was the construction of a self-standing two-story bathroom tower. At the time of its establishment, this institution was considered the only one of its kind in the Middle East- a modern European hospital that became a model for the founding of leprosy hospitals in various countries.

Over the years, Jerusalem grew until the asylum's location was no longer secluded yet it retained an aura of mystery. The surrounding area was used for agricultural purposes, mulberry trees belonging to the Greek Orthodox to the north, vineyards to the south, and was located near the military railway built by the British in 1917. The public regarded the asylum as a closed, isolated institution, although patients were in fact free to leave, and families could visit. The patients were from Muslim, Christian and Jewish communities throughout the country. Between the 1880s and the 1950s, the House hosted between 30 and 40 lepers and 3 and 5 nurses at any one time. One of the individuals who cared for the leprosy patients at the hospital was Rabbi Aryeh Levin, who would visit them weekly and pray with them during the High Holidays. He was unafraid of contracting the disease, believing that when a person performs acts of kindness for others, God protects them from harm.

In 1950, an agreement was signed in London transferring ownership of the complex from the Moravian Church to the Jewish National Fund. The fund bought the compound, and the Israeli Ministry of Health took over the running of the asylum, renaming it the Hansen Government Hospital (after the physician Gerhard Hansen, who identified the Leprosy bacteria). With the development of an effective cure for leprosy, more patients were rehabilitated and discharged, resulting in the closure of the hospitalization unit. In 1986, due to the building's significant historical and architectural value, it was declared a preserved building. From 2000 until 2009, the asylum operated as an ambulatory clinic before finally closing down.

The history of the hospital, descriptions of the Moravian church, the disease, the nurses, and the patients is documented by the daughter of a physician who lived and worked in the hospital.

== Statutory definitions ==
According to the statutory documents and regulations applicable to the Hansen Hospital complex, a clear legal framework governs the scope of planning interventions permitted on site. In 1992, the Jerusalem Municipality initiated Urban Plan No. 3653, changing the land use designation from private open space to institutional use and public open space. This plan, approved in 1993, includes a binding preservation clause (Section 10), which defines the hospital buildings as protected and subjects them to the terms of Urban Plan No. 2097. Renovations are permitted if they maintain the architectural character. Internal changes require full documentation and must not harm exterior facades or architectural values. In accordance with Plan No. 2097, the Hansen compound is included in the list of 110 historic buildings designated for preservation in Jerusalem.

== Restoration ==
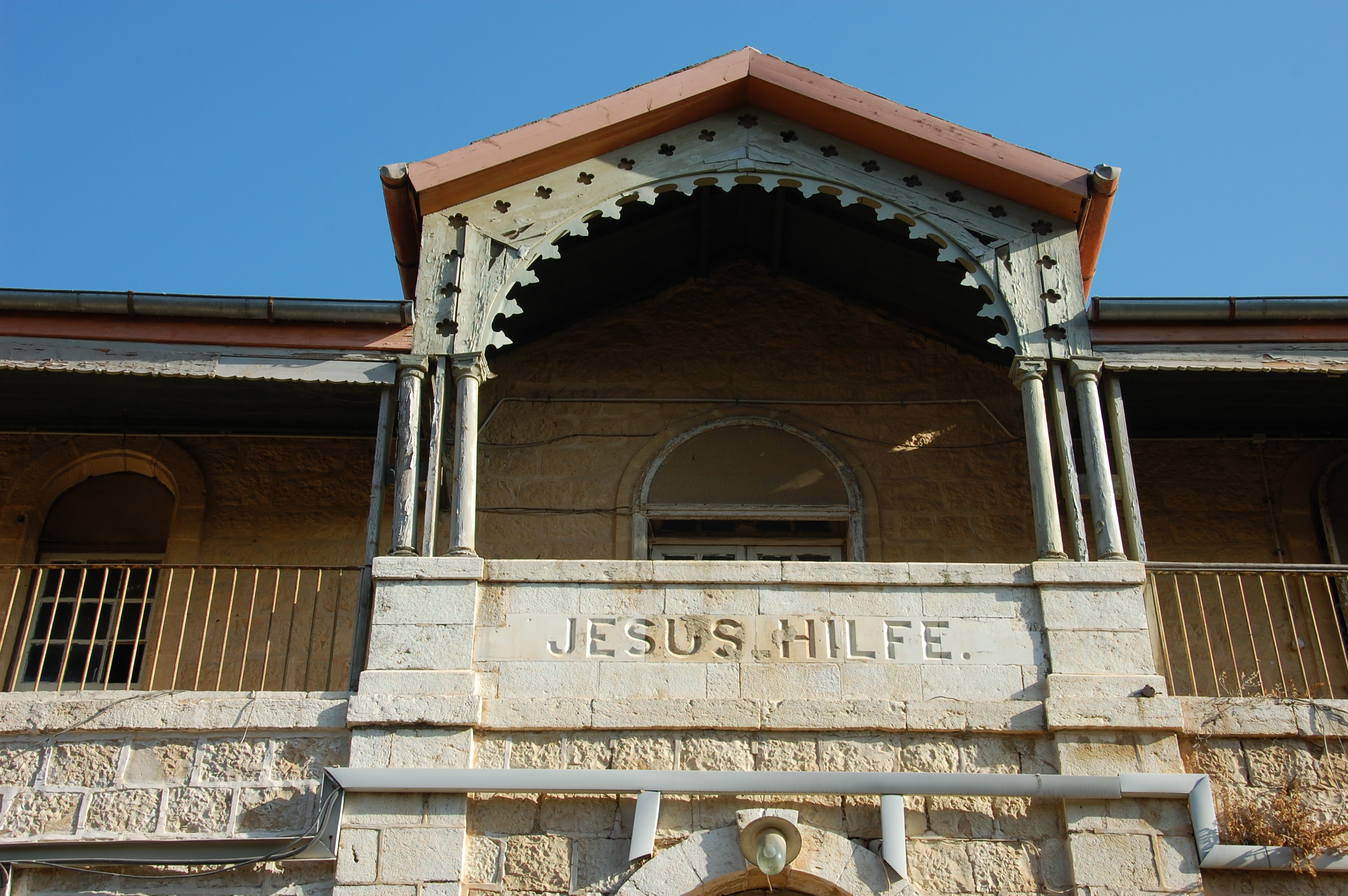

In 1986, due to the building's significant historical and architectural value, it was declared a preserved building. Medical activity continued gradually until 2010. In 2009, the complex was transferred to the jurisdiction of the Jerusalem Municipality. In parallel, four rooms were restored and converted into a permanent exhibition "Behind the Wall".

In 2011, the Jerusalem Development Authority commenced Hansen House renovation and preservation project. After careful thought about the house's new function, they decided to convert the historical asylum into a design, media and technology cultural center, where academic research, development, education, and public activities could take place. The conversion was headed by the Jerusalem Development Authority and Ran Wolf Urban Planning and Project Management, in cooperation with preservation architect Nahum Meltzer. This renovation and preservation work minimized interference with the spectacular structure of Hansen House. The work focused on the construction of modern infrastructure that would serve the new cultural center, as well as the restoration of the historical garden and trees.

The Restoration work was carried out in several phases, including stonework on the building’s walls, the perimeter wall, the entrance courtyard, and more. The exterior and most interior walls are 80 –100 cm thick, composed of two stone layers, outer and inner, with a fill of stone fragments mixed with Silt. The inner faces of the walls were plastered and whitewashed. Their considerable thickness allows them to bear the load of the arches and cross vaults, which were designed to protect the house’s residents from the summer heat. The “Jerusalem stone” used in the Hansen House complex is divided into several types of limestone. Among these are hard stones such as “Mizzi” (Arabic for “dry”), which are particularly durable and sometimes contain iron oxides that give them reddish, pinkish, or orange hues. In contrast, softer stones such as “Nari,” a calcareous crust, and “Kaakula,” were used to build supporting walls throughout the complex. The building is constructed of stone with a tiled roof and includes three stories above a basement level. It is organized around an interior courtyard built over a water cistern. Ultimately, it was decided to preserve the volumetric model while reconstructing it with high-quality new construction. Certain elements, such as cornices, were preserved in place, and original parts survived it was decided not to dismantle the stone.

The southern-facing main facade is symmetrically designed. At its center is an entrance structure with two symmetrical stone staircases leading to the entrance door. The stairs are built of solid ashlar stone and rest on an arch constructed of two rows of “Muqaddam” stones, with later concrete reinforcements at the base.The doorframe protrudes from the facade and was finished with careful detailing. Above it is engraved in stone the name of the institution: Jesus Hilfe (“With Jesus’ Help”), which has been fully preserved. On the first floor stands a stylized wooden triangular gable supported by four wooden columns. The gable was in poor condition, and the original wooden capitals were cracked and replaced with new wood resembling the old. Additional non-original support columns were added. The building’s windows include a variety of openings: arched, square, and rectangular, with carved stone frames. Most of the original wooden shutters did not survive and were not restored. The original stone floors were replaced over the years with terrazzo or polished concrete surfaces. The main wooden beams in the attic were preserved, while the intermediate beams were replaced with insulating material. Lighting fixtures were added along the ceiling. A specific anchoring detail was designed to support the beams against the stone wall. The conservation and renovation process of the Hansen House lasted about two years. Its goal was to transform the complex into a unique cultural center devoted to design, media, cinema, and technology, a combined venue in which academic and public activities coexist.

== Exhibition space ==
Hansen House has a historical exhibit focused on its past as a leper asylum and hosts changing exhibits. In 2009, the complex was transferred to the jurisdiction of the Jerusalem Municipality. In parallel, four rooms were restored and converted into a permanent exhibition "Behind the Wall" which presents the story of the complex to the public.

== Art school ==
The Bezalel Academy Graduate School is located within Hansen House through a unique model, incorporating academic research and studies with communal and social activity. Hansen House houses three graduate programs: the Industrial Design Department (design and technology, design and innovation management, and experimental design), the Graduate Program in Urban Design, and a Master in Policy & Theory of the Arts. Bezalel's External Studies and a variety of preparatory programs are also taught at Hansen House. Fabrication Laboratory - A digital manufacturing lab. The Jerusalem Film and Television Fund of the Jerusalem Development Authority is the first municipal film fund of its kind operating in Israel. Established in 2008, the fund supports the production of films and television series set in the city, with the aim of reflecting and highlighting the human and everyday aspects of Jerusalem, in contrast to its conventional, institutionalized stereotype.

== Mamuta project ==
The Sela-Manca group of independent Jerusalem-based artists initiated Mamuta, a project by Hearat Shulayim (footnote) Foundation in the fields of performance art, video, poetry, and public art. Since 2009, Mamuta has aimed to provide a framework for different types of creators—curators, architects, designers, and researchers—who are interested in sharing, knowledge exchange, intensive dialogue, and technological innovation. By creating an active community of artists, Mamuta allows for personal growth and collective work.

== Coffee shop ==
Ofaimme Farm's Coffee House – The Ofaimme Farm for Sustainable Agriculture adheres to strict organic standards as well as fair trade practices at their farm in the Negev Desert. Their handmade produce is slowly crafted using traditional techniques to create food that is tasty and healthy, guaranteed to be free of any type of genetic engineering, preservatives, pesticides, and hormones. All of their products are manufactured and packaged with complete respect for the environment and for the people who take part in the creative process. The complex houses two cafés: “Meshek Ofaimme” and “HaDir”. The cafe of Meshek Ofaimme was opened in the historic doctor’s house at Hansen House. The buildings adjacent this house serve as a farm shop, a private dining room for meals, meetings, and lectures, and an additional room that has been converted into a library for the benefit of Jerusalem students.HaDir which was opened in 2018, is located in what was once a goat pen, whose dairy products were used to supply the residents of the leper Hospital. For several decades, the place stood abandoned and desolate until it was decided to renovate it and reopen it.
