= Ruth Patir =

Ruth Patir (Hebrew: רות פתיר; born 1984) is an American-born Israeli contemporary digital artist, perhaps best known for her 2024 installation [M]otherland at the 60th Venice Biennale, which she voluntarily shut down until the time there would be a ceasefire between Israel and Hamas. It was never shown at the Biennale but is to be subsequently shown at the Tel Aviv Museum of Art and the Jewish Museum in Manhattan, with the latter institution having purchased the work.

Patir's work is held in the permanent collections of the Centre Pompidou in Paris and the Jewish Museum in New York City.
