= Mains d'Oeuvres =

Arts organization in Saint-Ouen, France

- Established: 1991
- Location: 1 Rue Charles Garnier, 93400 Saint-Ouen, France
- Website: www.mainsdoeuvres.org

Mains d’Œuvres (Manpower) is a not-for-profit arts organization based in Saint-Ouen, a suburb of Paris. The organization supports contemporary art by coordinating residencies for emerging artists and by programming exhibitions and events.

== History ==
Mains d’Œuvres is situated in a refurbished Valeo car factory, which was used as an employee community and sports center until the company sold the building in 1991. In 1991, four organizations: Usines Ephemeres, TransEuropeHalles network, Vecam and Europe 99, combined to create Mains d'Œuvres. A pioneer of its time, Mains d'Œuvres spearheaded the widespread phenomenon in Europe during the 1990s, which consisted of turning factories into placed dedicated to new, inventive art forms.

A 4000 square metre Mains d’Œuvres arts centre opened in Saint-Ouen in 2001.

== Overview ==
Attributing its outlook to Gilles Deleuze's Difference and Repetition, Mains d’Œuvres describes itself as, "Sensual and intellectual, specialist and non-specialist...an experimental art space open to everyone." Offering visual and digital arts, music, dance, theater, cinema, lectures and educational events to the public, the organization is supported by the Conseil général de la Seine-Saint-Denis, Ministère de la Culture (France), and the Ministère de la Jeunesse et des Sports.

== Music ==
Mains d’Œuvres is most recognized for its offerings in the field of music. Concerts, parties, and residency programs establish the organization on an international field. Residencies are open to a wide range of styles such as electronic, rap, and world music. Due to the approach of creating ties between all styles, Mains d’Œuvres offers a venue open to all musical experimentation. Notable musicians who have worked with, or at Main d'Œuvres include: Herman Dune, Etienne Jaumet, Cheveu and Frustration.

== Digital art ==
The Craslab is offered by Mains d’Œuvres for members of the public interested in learning and testing real-time interaction technologies. CrasLab tutors offer educative classes focusing on open-source hardware and free software to the likes of Freeduino and Pure data. Consecutively in 2006, 2007, and 2008, Mains d'Œuvres hosted The Mal Au Pixel festival of electronic art and subcultures, presenting original experiences based on interactive and participative works, hybrid performances, concerts and other unexpected encounters.

== Dance ==
Mains d’Œuvres offers dance residency programs that are open to projects which are singular in their research as well as in their attempt to (re)question or rethink society and the art of choreography. Two types of choreographic residency-programs exist at Mains d’Œuvres: long term (3 years) and project based (approx. 1 year). Currently, there are four long-term residency and six project-based companies. Yearly, six to eight dance pieces are presented publicly. The dance residency program at Mains d’Œuvres aims to render companies financially & professionally autonomous and publicly acclaimed. Notable past residents include: Cindy Van Acker, Perrine Vally, and François Laroche Valière.

== Theatre ==
Mains d’Œuvres offers a residency program for theatre companies to develop off-mainstream research, different from the classical stage sets. Artists are guided through the whole creation progress. Principally a space for thinking and experimenting theatre, the venue also publicly presents the supported projects in order to bring the artist public and professional recognition. Yearly, up to five companies take part in a two or one-year residency program, and up to six pieces are presented publicly.

== Visual art ==
Mains d'Oeuvres has held several exhibitions showcasing artists such as Wim Delvoye, Thomas Hirschhorn, Sophie Calle, Jon Bernad, Neil Beloufa, Pauline Bastard, Ivan Argote, Dominique Blais, Etienne Jaumet, Herman Dune, and Marie Hendriks. Isabelle Le Normand was curator there between 2008 and 2013. Anne Stouvenel took over as curator in 2013.
