= Bloomfield Science Museum =

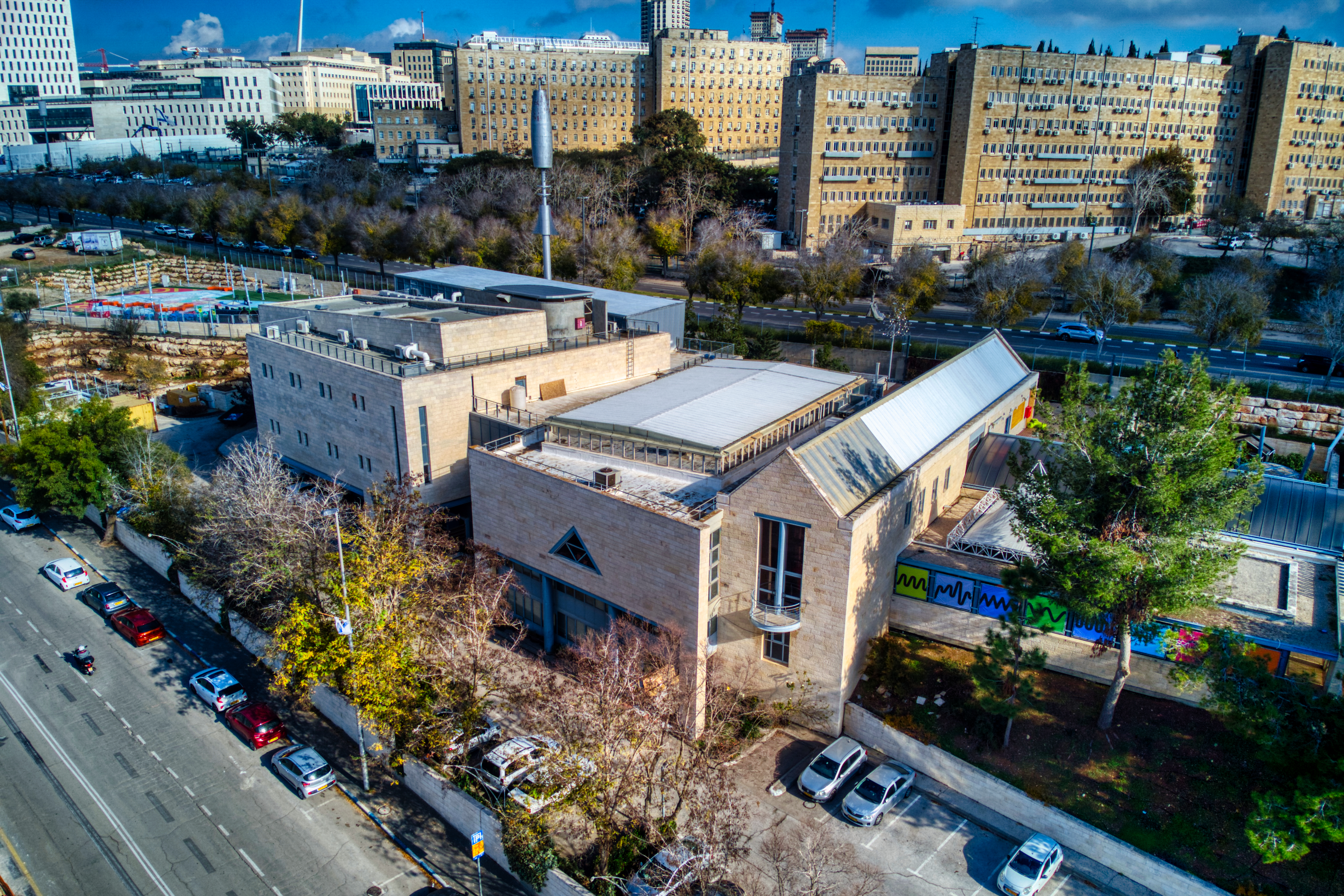
- Aerial view of the Bloomfield Science Museum, Jerusalem
- Interactive fullscreen map
- Established: 1992
- Location: 3 Museum Boulevard; Givat Ram; Jerusalem, Israel
- Coordinates: 31°46′41.9″N 35°12′01.8″E
- Type: Science museum
- Public transit access: Science Museum/HaMuze'onim Blvd
- Website: mada.org.il/en

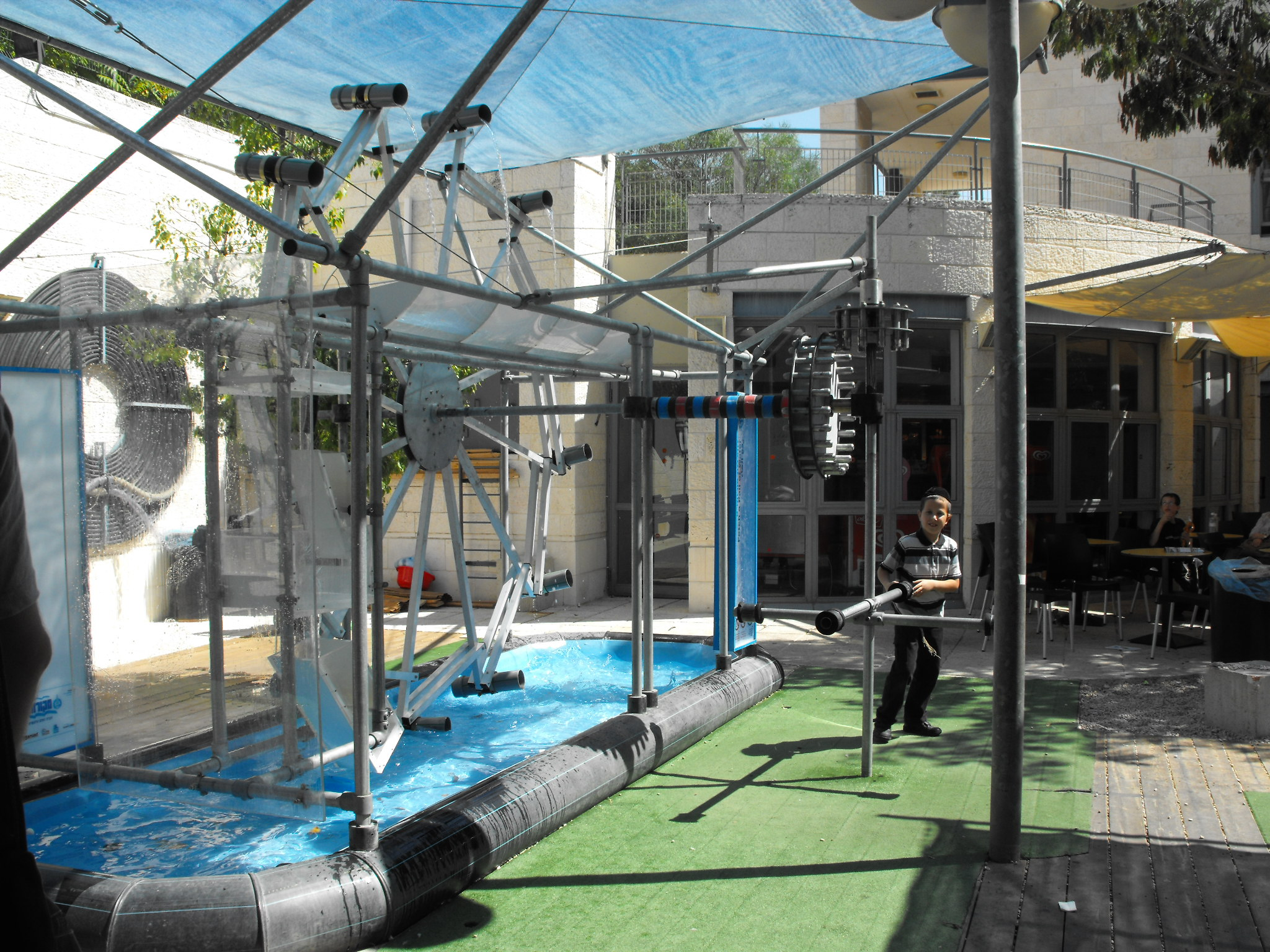
Bubble exhibit at Bloomfield Science Museum, Jerusalem.

Bloomfield Science Museum is a science museum in Jerusalem, established in 1992.

The museum is located opposite the Hebrew University of Jerusalem, in the Givat Ram neighborhood. The museum is named for its principal donor, Neri Bloomfield. The museum features indoor and outdoor hands-on exhibits, among them a bubble-making corner in which huge bubbles are produced by chains and sticks.

Special events at the museum include programs on science-related topics, such as biomedical research, in which the public is invited to meet stem cell researchers and discuss the ethical issues involved. A special night science program sponsored by the European Union has been held at the museum for several years.

== See also ==
- Science and technology in Israel
- Tourism in Israel
- List of museums in Israel
