= Ahimeir =

Ahimeir is a surname. Notable people with the surname include:

- Abba Ahimeir (1897–1962), Belarusian Jewish journalist, historian, and political activist
- Ya'akov Ahimeir (born 1938), Israeli journalist
- Yosef Ahimeir (born 1943), Israeli journalist and politician
