= Sokolov Award =

Israeli journalism prize

- Awarded for: Outstanding journalism
- Country: Israel
- Presented by: Municipality of Tel Aviv-Yafo
- First award: 1956; 70 years ago

The Sokolov Award, also known as Sokolov Prize, is an Israeli journalism award, awarded by the Tel Aviv municipality, in memory of Nahum Sokolow.

The award has been granted since 1956, initially to print journalists and since 1981 to journalists from the electronic media. It is considered the second most prestigious award for Israeli journalism, second only to the Israel Prize for Communications.

The prize is awarded annually, in close proximity to Nahum Sokolow's birthday (ה' בשבט, Hebrew calendar), or the anniversary of his death (י"ב באייר, Hebrew calendar).

== Objectives ==
The prize is awarded to encourage journalistic excellence.

== Committee of judges ==
The Sokolov Award's statute stipulates that the mayor should appoint a selecting committee of three members (an academy figure, a jurist and a representative of the mayor), who in turn pick the judges on the award committee. The City Council then determines whether to approve the judges. The judges are made up of two senior journalists, two academy figures, and a representative of the municipality.

== The prize ==
Winners receive a monetary prize. As of 2007, the prize was 18,000 shekels.

== Winners ==
Winners by year
Year	Name	Notes/awarded for
1956	David Zakai	
1956	Yosef Yambur	
1956	Benzion Katz	
1956	Ezriel Carlebach	
1956	Ephraim Talmi	
1958	Yehuda Gotthelf	
1958	Yosef Heftman	
1958	Aryeh Navon	
1958	Ephraim Kishon	
1958	Ezra Rivlis	
1959	David Lazar	
1959	Uri Keysari	
1959	Haim Shrer	
1959	Moshe Sharett	-
1961	Rafael Bashan	
1961	Herzl Berger	
1961	Haim Gouri	
1964	Michael Bar-Zohar	-
1964	Yitzhak Gruenbaum	
1964	Kuf' Shabtai	-
1966	Ruth Bondy	
1966	Herzl Rosenblum	
1969	Haim Hefer	-
1969	Isaac Ramba	
1972	Hana Zemer	-
1972	Baruch Nadal	-
1972	Ya'akov Rabi	-
1975	Yeshayahu Avrech	-
1975	Mark Geffen	
1975	Shalom Rosenfeld	-
1975	Ze'ev Schiff	
1977	Aryeh Disenchick	-
1977	Haviv Canaan	
1981	Michael Assaf	
1981	Nahum Barnea	
1981	Ya'akov Farkash (Ze'ev)	
1984	Haim Isaac	
1984	Ya'akov Erez, Avi Bettelheim, Avraham Tirosh	
1985	Eitan Almog	
1985	Yossi Goddard	
1985	Ziv Yonatan	
1985	Ehud Yaari	
1985	Israel public channel 1, Israel Army Radio and Kol Yisrael teams	
1988	Gideon Greif	
1988	Edna Pe'er	
1988	Avshalom Kor	
1988	Danny Rubinstein	
1988	Nehemia Shtrasler	
1993	Itai Anghel	
1993	Dov Bar-Nir	
1993	Dudu Dayan	
1993	Yehudith Lutz	
1993	Shlomo Nakdimon	
1993	Hanna Kim	
1993	Gideon Remez	
1993	Shlomo Nizan, Yair Garbuz, Danny Carmen, Tirtzah Eisenberg	
1998	Michael Handelzalts	
1998	Mishe Zack	
1998	Rafik Halabi	
1998	Tommy Lapid	
1998	Carmela Menashe	
1998	Moshe Negbi	
1998	Sever Plocker	
1998	Doron Rosenblum	
2000	Mordechai Gilat	
2000	Natan Zahavi	
2000	Dov Yodkovsky	
2000	Yehiel Limor and Rafi Mann	
2000	Amos Carmeli	
2000	Michal Niv	
2000	Einat Fishbein	
2002	Mordechai Naor	
2002	Anat Tal Shir and Zadoc Yehezkeli	
2002	Razi Barkai	
2002	Nakdimon Rogel	
2002	Oded Shahar	
2004	Uri Avnery	
2004	Daniel Ben-Simon	
2004	Emmanuel Halperin	
2004	Hanoch Marmari	
2004	Ruvik Rosenthal	
2004	Mickey Rosenthal	
2004	Muli Shapira	
2005	Ya'akov Ahimeir	
2005	Ben Shani	
2005	Gideon Eshet	
2005	Guy Leshem	
2006	Uzi Benizman	
2006	Ruth Sinai	
2006	Nissim Mishal	
2006	Itai Landsberg	
2007	Shlomi Eldar	
2007	Yaron London	
2007	Uri Klein	
2007	Ran Resnik	
2008	Aryeh Golan	
2008	Yaron Dekel	
2008	Uri Elitzur	
2009	David Witzthum	
2009	Omri Asenheim	
2009	Zvi Barel	
2009	Yossi Melman	
2011	Igal Sarna	
2011	Vardi Kahana	
2011	Haim Rivlin	
2011	Raviv Drucker	
2015	Gidi Weitz	
2017	Yoel Marcus	
2017	Ronen Bergman	
2017	Nadav Eyal	
2017	Itai Anghel	
2019	Rino Tzror	
2019	Yael Dan	
2019	Roni Linder	
2019	Yosi Verter	
2021	Ohad Hemo	
2021	Ifat Glick	
2021	Gideon Levy	
2021	Karina Shtotland	
2023	Merav Arlozorov	
2023	Shani Haziza	
2023	Guy Peleg	
2023	Shooki Taussig, Oren Persiko, and Itamar B.Z, members of HaAyin HaShevi'it ("the Seventh Eye") editorial team	
