= Ilia Yefimovich =

Israeli photographer (born 1988)

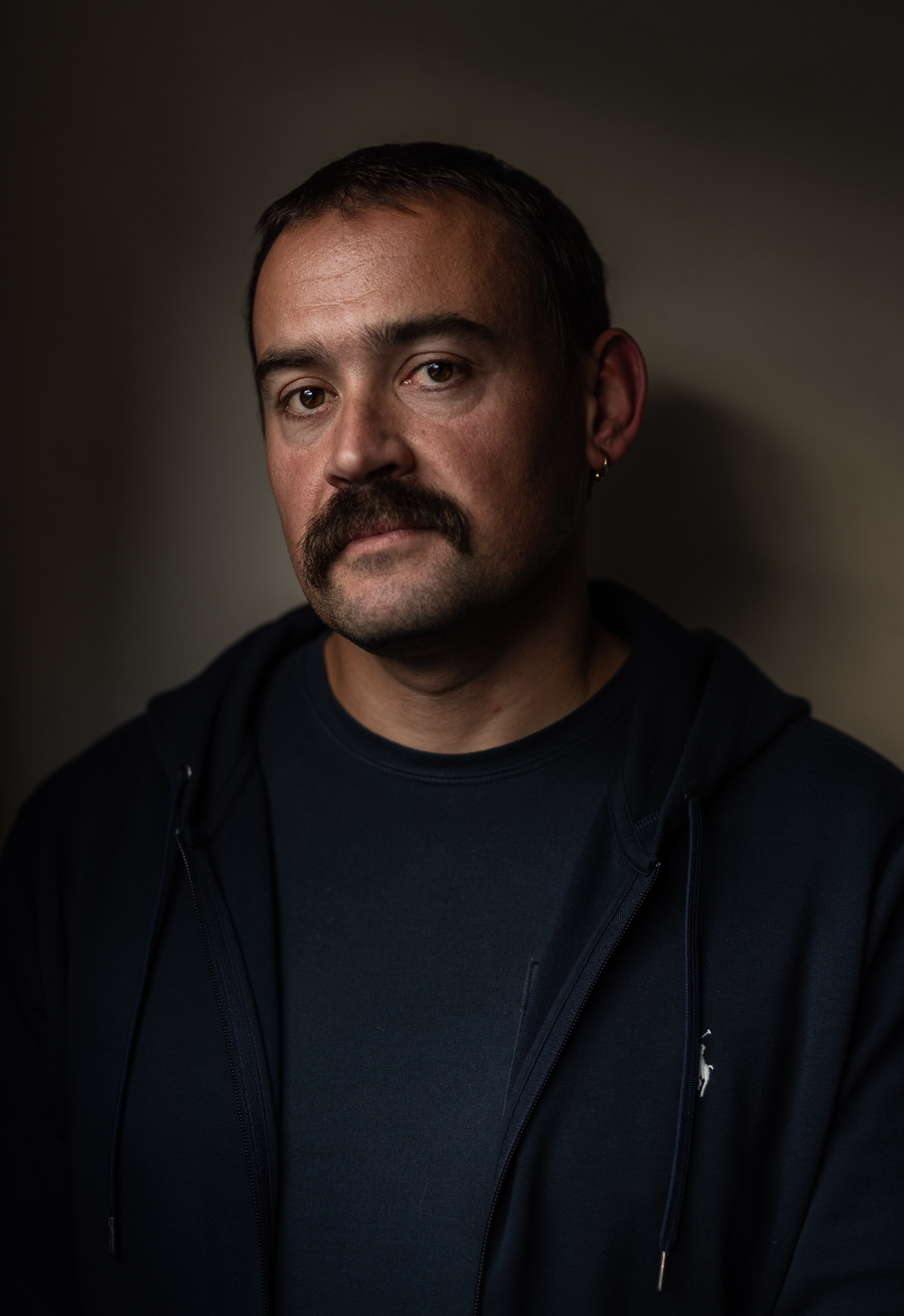
- Yefimovich in 2026
- Born: 1988 (age 37–38); Moscow, Soviet Union (now Russia)
- Citizenship: Israel and Russia
- Education: Minshar College for Art (Tel Aviv)
- Occupations: Documentary photographer, Photojournalist, Curator, Educator
- Website: https://ilia-yefimovich.com/

Ilia Yefimovich (born 1988) is a Russian-born Israeli documentary photographer and photojournalist known for his extensive coverage of the Israeli-Palestinian conflict, social issues, and territorial conflicts across Russia and the Middle East. His work, often characterized by an empathetic and observational style, has been featured by major news agencies and exhibited internationally.

== Career ==
Ilia Yefimovich’s professional career in photojournalism began in the mid-2000s, focusing heavily on regions defined by geopolitical tension and conflict. He served as a staff photographer for the Russian News agency ITAR TASS from 2009 to 2014, where he covered the Israeli-Palestinian conflict. He later worked as a freelance photographer for Getty Images (2011–2017), German Press Agency (DPA) (2017-2025). He is a staff photographer for Agence France-Presse from November 2025. His photographs frequently appear in international publications, documenting day-to-day life alongside significant news events. Yefimovich co-founded "The Archive Magazine," an Israeli platform dedicated to promoting and showcasing documentary photography. He has shared his expertise by teaching photography at the Minshar art school and the Massa Jewish Agency, and has served as a curator for the Local Testimony exhibition in Israel from 2025.

== Awards ==
- 2011. POYI (Picture of the Year International): Award of Excellence for Spot News and Finalist Award for impact (Gaza-Israel).
- 2011. Local Testimony: Winner of the "Photo of the Year"
- 2011. Lead Award (Germany): Photo of the Year.
- 2013. International Arte Laguna Prize: 1st place in the Under 25 category (Venice, Italy).
- 2023. Roi Idan Prize for War Coverage.
- 2024. POY Asia: First Place in General News.
- 2024. Uri Avnery Award For Courageous Journalism.

== Exhibitions ==
=== Solo ===
Selected Solo Exhibitions
Year	Title	Location	Notes
2010	Thought observing Palestina	Israeli Cultural Center, Moscow, Russia	
2012	Searching Mode : Landscape #001	Tavi Gallery, Tel-Aviv, Israel	
2013	Portraits in the Landscape	Moscow Museum of Modern Art (MMOMA), Moscow, Russia	Part of the Photo Biennale.
2014	Searching Mode: Recreation	Tel-Aviv Opera, Tel-Aviv, Israel	
2014	Baked Land	Fab-Lab Gallery, Tel-Aviv, Israel	
2014	Once upon a time there was a light, light so bright that no one could see	Agripas 12 Gallery, Jerusalem, Israel	
2015	Reliance	Minshar Gallery, Tel-Aviv, Israel	
2015	Hard To Remember	Art-Villa Gallery, Tuscany, Italy	
2016	Once upon a time there was a light…	Photo-Bibleoteka, Art-Play, Moscow, Russia	
2016	A-Local	Tsekh Gallery, Kyiv, Ukraine	
2016	A-local	Froots Gallery, Shanghai, China	Focuses on his work regarding territory and conflict.
2017	A-local	Froots Gallery, Beijing, China	
2019	in-diebus-illis	Rotterdam Photography Festival, Rotterdam, Netherlands	
2020	paradox-of-apocalypse	Rotterdam Photo Festival, Rotterdam, Netherlands	
2021	in-diebus-illis	Perm, Russia	
2025	Dairy of War	Rotterdam Photography Festival, Rotterdam, Netherlands	Exhibit documenting the Israel-Gaza conflict (2023–2024).

=== Group ===
- 2011 – Graduation exhibition, Minshar Gallery, Tel Aviv, Israel.
- 2012 – Group show, Royal Shakespeare Company, Stratford-upon-Avon, United Kingdom.
- 2012 – Foto8 Summer Show, Foto8 Gallery, London, United Kingdom.
- 2012 – III Moscow International Biennale for Young Art, Moscow, Russia.
- 2013 – 7th Arte Laguna Prize exhibition (Under 25), Venice, Italy.
- 2013 – IAAB residency exhibition, Basel, Switzerland.
- 2013 – Liquid Borders group exhibitions, Gdynia, Poland, and venues in Romania.
- 2013 – 10th‑anniversary exhibition, Local Testimony, Eretz Israel Museum, Tel Aviv, Israel.
- 2014 – Group exhibition, Laura Haber Art Gallery, Buenos Aires, Argentina.
- 2014 – Liquid Borders, MECA, Spain.
- 2015 – Untitled, Untitled Gallery, Barcelona, Spain.
- 2015 – Tel Aviv Photo Fair, Port Gallery, Jaffa, Israel.
- 2016 – PhotoBook Melbourne, Melbourne, Australia.
- 2016 – Tabellae Innocentium, International Photography Festival, Jaffa, Israel.
- 2016 – A‑Local, Shanghai Photo Fair, Shanghai, China.
- 2017 – Without Borders, Circle1 Gallery, Berlin, Germany.
- 2017 – Kolga Award exhibition, Tbilisi, Georgia.
- 2018 – Le forme dell’attesa, Spazio Don Chisciotte, Fondazione Bottari Lattes / Areacreativa42, Turin, Italy.
- 2018 – Transform Europe, Vienna, Austria.
- 2018 – Stand P26, CMB, London Art Fair, London, United Kingdom.
- 2024 – South Album, Petah Tikva Museum of Art, Petah Tikva, Israel.
- 2024 – October 7 (October Seventh), ANU – Museum of the Jewish People, Tel Aviv, Israel.

== Notes ==
- X, FUJIFILM (2019-04-18). "Ilia Yefimovitch | X-Photographers | FUJIFILM X Series & GFX - Finland" (in Finnish).
- Wille, Belkis (2024-07-17). ""I Can't Erase All the Blood from My Mind"". Human Rights Watch.
- elad (2024-03-14). "Security Planning for Postwar Gaza". The Jerusalem Strategic Tribune.
- "Ilia Yefimovich - Blink Network". Blink.
- "Ilia Yefimovich". COCA PROJECT | Open calls for artists.
