= Kobi Wolf =

Israeli photographer

Kobi Wolf קובי וולף
- Born: 1975 (age 50–51); Tel Aviv, Israel
- Known for: photography
- Movement: photojournalism, documentary photography
- Awards: Local Testimony 2015. Best Series.
- Website: www.kobiwolf.com

Kobi Wolf (Hebrew: קובי וולף) is an Israeli photographer specializing in photojournalism.

== Biography ==
Kobi Wolf graduated from the Geographical Photography Academy in Tel Aviv. He traveled extensively within Asia and Africa for eight years after graduation documenting local life. After returning to Israel, Wolf mostly worked on the subjects of the Israeli–Palestinian conflict and social protest. He has also documented the crisis of refugees from Africa. He works as a freelance news photojournalist for international news magazines and newspapers, including Haaretz, Time, The Washington Post, The Wall Street Journal, The Sunday Times, De Volkskrant, NRC, Le figaro, The New York Times, Bloomberg, and National Geographic.

== Exhibitions ==
Kobi Wolf exhibits mostly in Israel. He is a regular participant in the Local Testimony exhibition at the Eretz Israel Museum, where he has exhibited every year since 2011. He held a solo exhibition "Pictures from Abarbanel" at the Masa Acher School of Photography in Tel Aviv, curated by Miki Kratsman. He participated in Israel's International Photography Festival in 2012.

== Awards ==
The Uri Avnery Award for Courageous Journalism 2024

Kobi Wolf won numerous awards at Local Testimony since 2007 including first prize for best series in 2015.

He was a finalist in the World Press Photo of the Year competition.

== See also ==
- Visual arts in Israel
- Journalism in Israel
