= Itai Anghel =

Israeli journalist

- איתי אנגל
- Born: April 6, 1968 (age 57)
- Occupation(s): correspondent, documentary filmmaker
- Awards: 2017 Sokolov Award

Itai Anghel (Hebrew: איתי אנגל) is an Israeli correspondent and documentary filmmaker. He is a staff reporter for Uvda, a television news program on Channel 12 (Keshet). He mainly covers conflict zones all over the world. In 2017 Anghel was awarded the 'Sokolov Award' which is Israel's highest award for journalism. Anghel is also a lecturer of history and international relations. He teaches a course about world conflicts in universities in Tel Aviv.

== Journalism career ==
Angel attended Tichon Hadash high school in Tel Aviv. Anghel begun his work as a journalist in 1989, as the foreign affairs editor of Galei Tzahal - Galatz, Israel Army Radio. While editing the world news, he edited and hosted the news magazine and consequently was awarded the "Galei Tzahal Chief Commander award". In 1993, he started working with Israeli TV's Channel 2 news, as the world news editor. Later, he started working for the main week's magazine for Channel 2, creating documentaries. Moving up the ladder of Israeli journalism, Anghel later moved to Uvda, hosted by Ilana Dayan.

In 1991 he was sent to Croatia to cover the war. Between 1992 and 1995 he was sent to Bosnia several times, and sent his reports to Galey Tzahal and Haaretz, a daily newspaper in Israel. These reports awarded him the first Sokolov Award for his outstanding work in journalism. He also reported from Russia, Lithuania, Latvia, Georgia, and Azerbaijan, focusing on the conditions of these countries in the aftermath of the breakup of the Soviet Union.

In 1994 Anghel was sent to Rwanda to cover its civil war. In 1999 he covered the war in Kosovo and in 2000 he returned to Yugoslavia. In 2001, after the September 11, 2001 attacks on the World Trade Center in New York City, he was sent to Pakistan and Afghanistan.

In Israel, he covered the al-Aqsa Intifada in Ramallah, Nablus, and Jenin.

While working for Uvda, he was sent to Iraq in 2003 to create a documentary on the post-Saddam Hussein era. In 2004, he traveled to Indonesia to cover the tsunami disaster set off by the 2004 Indian Ocean earthquake. In December 2005, he returned to Iraq with Uvda to provide a retrospective of the previous years and resultant chaos there.

During the 2006 Lebanon War, Anghel accompanied a Nahal unit of the Israel Defense Forces on a night mission in Southern Lebanon. The documentary shows actual encounters with Hezbollah.

Later that year, Anghel traveled to the Democratic Republic of Congo, and returned with a three-part documentary depicting the horrors and atrocities in the area. Following a positive response to these broadcasts, he decided to arrange a rock concert benefit for Congo. It led to a special delegation of Israeli Gynecologists who went for one month to the remote areas in the jungles of East Congo, setting there clinics and, for a period of one month, treating the women who were raped violently, and besides, providing local women and men nurses the essential equipment to treat them in the following years.

In December 2012, Anghel and fellow Israeli journalist Amir Tivon entered Syria to report on its civil war.

In December 2014, Anghel went to Syria again to report on the civil war. His research was broadcast on Uvda.

A year later, he returned to northern Syria to the Kurdish enclave of Kobanî which was under siege of ISIS. In this documentary Anghel also reported on the mass emigration of Kurds to Europe, with a focus on Berlin. His reporting was again broadcast on Uvda. In 2017 Anghel went to Mosul to report from the front-line in the war against ISIS.

In 2023, he reported from the Russian-occupied Donbas region in Ukraine.

In December 2024, he visited Damascus, Syria, several days after the Fall of the Assad regime. He visited abandoned Syrian military bases and the Iranian embassy, interviewing civilians and soldiers. The visit was broadcast on Uvda.

== Awards ==
In 2010, Anghel received a Cutting Edge prize from the International Council for Press and Broadcasting at the sixth annual International Media Awards in London to celebrate high standards of analysis and reporting in the Middle East.

Sokolov Awards

In 2017 Anghel won the 'Sokolov Award' which is the highest award for journalism in Israel. In the reasons for the award it was written: "The award for excellence in journalistic work is given to Itai Anghel on bringing Israeli viewers a real picture from war zones and remote conflicts with a considerable degree of personal risk. In all his years, Anghel has been very successful in highlighting the human aspect of wars.”

Israel Documentary Awards In the past 7 years Anghel has won 5 times the ‘Best TV documentary’ award by the ‘Israeli forum of documentary filmmakers':

- 2011 - The revolution across the border - The revolution in Egypt
- 2012 - Human trafficking of Eritrean refugees in Sinai peninsula
- 2013 - The Syrian rebellion in Edlib
- 2015 - The front line against ISIS and the women guerrilla fighters
- 2017 - Invisibles in Mosul - The battle for the capital of ISIS in Iraq

== See also ==
- Television in Israel
