= Vardi Kahana =

Israeli photographer

Vardi Kahana ורדי כהנא
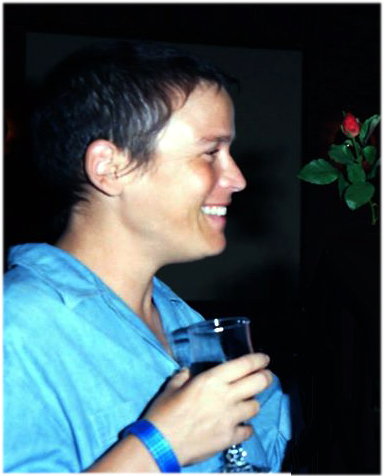
- Born: 1959 (age 66–67); Tel Aviv, Israel
- Education: HaMidrasha – Faculty of the Arts, Beit Berl College
- Known for: photography
- Movement: Israeli art, Photojournalism
- Website: vardikahana.com

Vardi Kahana (Hebrew: ורדי כהנא; born 1959) is an Israeli photographer.

== Biography ==
Kahana was born in Tel Aviv in 1959. She grew up in a religious family and attended Zeitlin school. She studied art in HaMidrasha – Faculty of the Arts, Beit Berl College, but did not graduate.

At the beginning of the 1980s, Kahana began her career in photography reporting for Monitin magazine, and within a short period of time settled into magazine photography. As part of her job she has photographed a variety of Israeli figures.

In 1983, she joined Hadashot newspaper, working there until 1993 when the newspaper closed. In 1995, she began working for 7 days newspaper, which is held by Yedioth Ahronoth.

== Exhibitions ==
In recent years, she has exhibited her works at many solo shows around the world, including The Public Library in Amsterdam, Fotomuseum Antwerp, Jewish Museum of Belgium, Pecci Museum, Tel Aviv Museum of Art, Academy of Arts, Berlin, Jewish Museum Munich, Haifa Museum of Art, Contemporary Jewish Museum in San Francisco. Major retrospectives of her work have been shown in The Art Gallery at Yad Labanim Ramat HaSharon and "The Artists House" in Rehovot.

=== Solo exhibitions ===
- 1992 'Photography : Vardi Kahana', Camera Obscura Gallery, Tel Aviv, Israel
- 2001 'Beauty Has Cut Itself Of', Ramat Gan Museum, Israel
- 2007 'Israeli portrait', Artist's House, Tel Aviv Israel
- 2007 'One Family', Andrea Meislin Gallery NY NY
- 2007 'One Family', Tel Aviv Museum of Art, Tel Aviv, Israel
- 2008 'One Family', Pecci Museum, Prato, Italy.
- 2008 'A Photographer of people', Academy of Design and Photography, Haifa, Israel
- 2008 'One Family', Academie der Kunste, Berlin, Germany
- 2008 'One Family', Photo Museum, Antwerp, Belgium
- 2008 'One Family', The Jewish Museum, Brussels, Belgium
- 2009 'One Family', Arts Depot, London, England
- 2010 'One Family', The Public Library, Amsterdam, Holland
- 2010 'One Family', Sinti and Roma Museum, Heidelberg, Germany
- 2010 'One Family', The Bundestag, Berlin, Germany
- 2012 'Near and Far', The Artists House, Rehovot, Israel
- 2013 'Fields of Vision', The Art Gallery at Yad Labanim, Ramat Hasharon, Israel
- 2015 'One Family', The Center for Jewish Life, Princeton University
- 2023 "Zakhor/Remember", Museum of the Ara Pacis.

== Works ==
Her most famous photograph, from 10 February 1983, depicts a demonstration of the Peace Now movement in Jerusalem, on which Emil Grunzweig appears a few minutes before his assassination.

Kahana's works are in the collection of the Israel Museum, Jerusalem.

Kahana was a curator of Local Testimony – a Middle East regional exhibition of photojournalism for several years.

== Books ==
- One Family. Tel Aviv Museum of Art. 2007. ISBN 978-9657161609.

== Awards ==
- 2011. Sokolov Award for outstanding achievements in journalism. Kahana is the first photographer receiving this award.
