= Yoel Marcus =

Israeli journalist and political commentator (1932–2022)

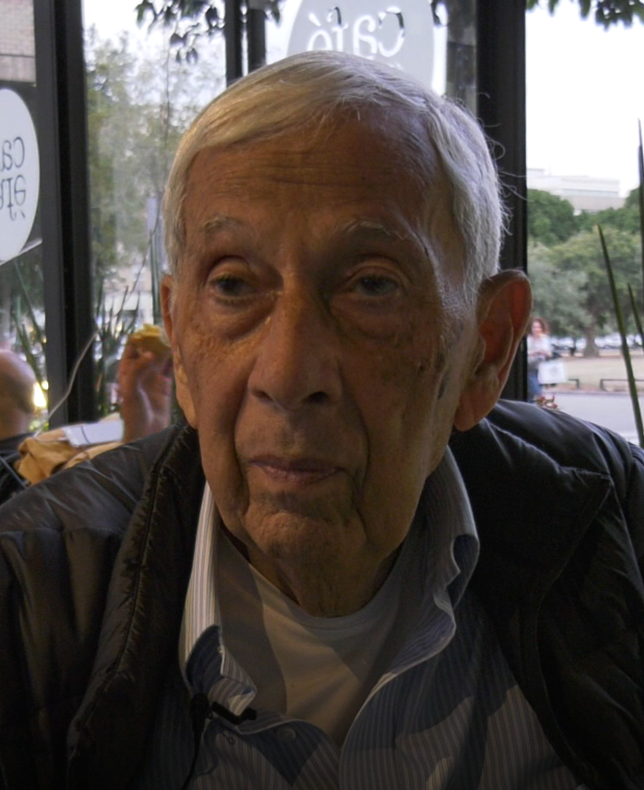
Yoel Marcus

Yoel Marcus (Hebrew: יואל מרקוס; 5 February 1932 – 23 February 2022) was an Israeli journalist and political commentator.

== Biography ==
Marcus was born in Istanbul on 5 February 1932. At the age of eleven, he immigrated to Mandatory Palestine alone with Youth Aliyah. He was sent to the youth village at Kibbutz Yagur, near Haifa.

Marcus died on 23 February 2022, shortly after his 90th birthday.

== Journalism career ==
Marcus was a commentator for the Israeli newspaper Haaretz. He believed in brevity, no more than 600 words per column, and divided his columns into numbered "comments." In 2007, he won a lifetime achievement award at the Eilat journalism conference. In 2017, he was awarded the Sokolov Prize for lifetime achievement.
