= MeHayom LeMahar =

Israeli television news program

Show's Logo 2002–2008

MeHayom LeMahar (Hebrew: מהיום למחר lit. From today until tomorrow) was an Israeli current affairs news show, broadcast from 1994 to 2012 on Channel 1.

The hosts of the show were David Witzthum and Emmanuel Halperin.

== See also ==
- Mabat LaHadashot
- David Witzthum
- Emmanuel Halperin
