= David Witzthum =

David Witzthum דוד ויצטום
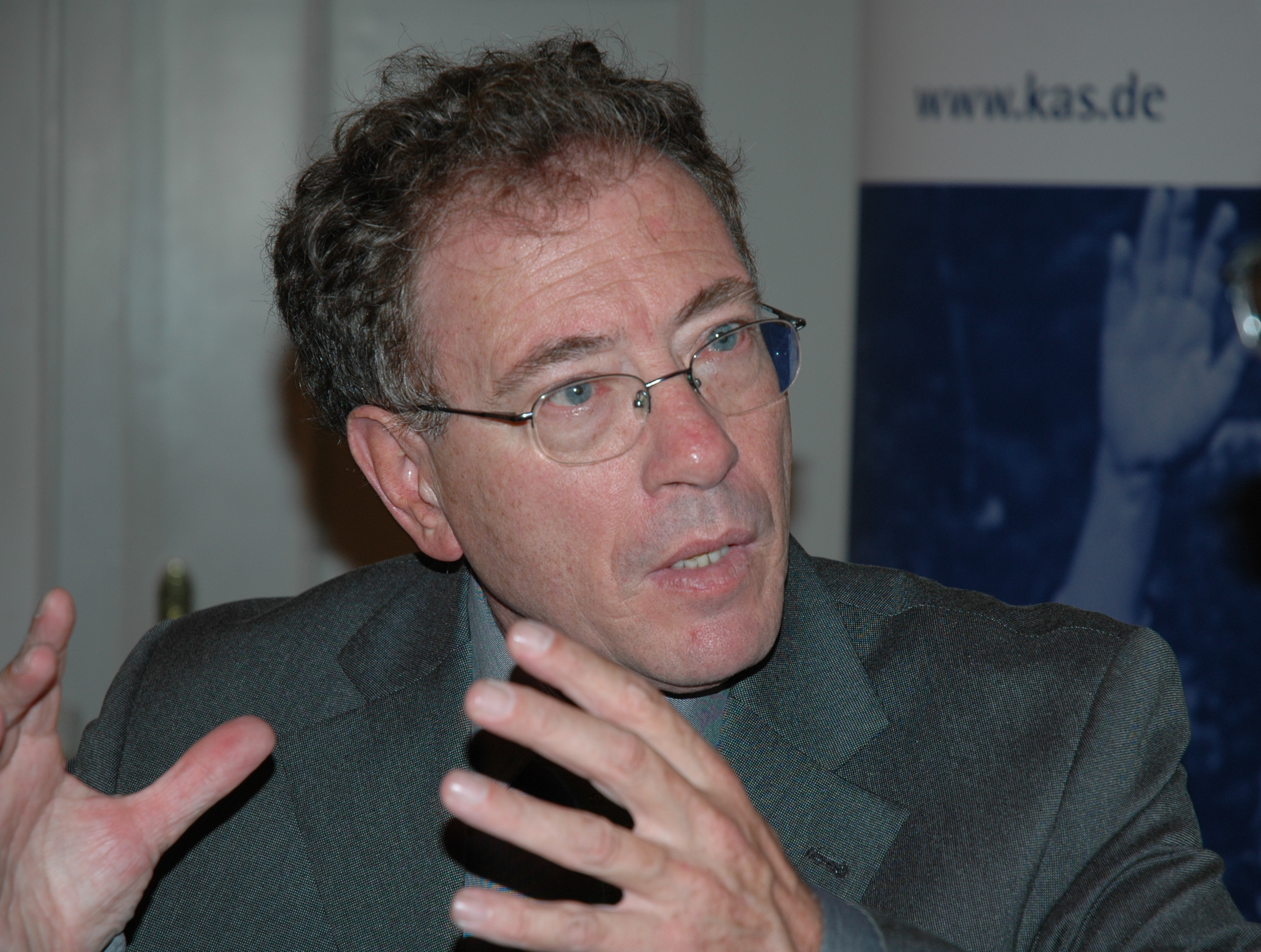
- Born: 17 January 1948 (age 78)
- Occupation: Journalism

David Witzthum (Hebrew: דוד ויצטום; born on January 17, 1948) is an Israeli television presenter and editor and lecturer on German history and culture. He is mostly known in Israel as one of the main presenters of the nightly news program MeHayom LeMahar.

== Biography ==
David Witzthum was born in Petah-Tikva, Israel. His father immigrated from Berlin, his mother from Chernivtsi. He grew up (with his sister Orna) in Haifa and graduated from the Hebrew Reali School in 1966. After military service as a meteorologist in 1966–1969, he earned a B.A. in Political Science and International Relations at the Hebrew University of Jerusalem (1969–1972).

A year later, he won a scholarship for graduate studies at the Collège d'Europe, in Bruges, Belgium, on European Integration, (Promotion "Mazzini", 1974), and then went to Oxford University, England (political philosophy, 1974–1977, at Wolfson College). Later, Witzhum received his M.A. Degree from the Hebrew University (Political Science) and started research towards Ph.D. at the Hebrew University (2nd and final stage – of actual writing the dissertation on "the image of Germany in Israeli television, 1970–1995").

He serves on the Advisory Board of the Israel Council on Foreign Relations.

Witzthum is married and has two children and one granddaughter. His wife Tsipora works for the classical music department of Israel Radio. The family lives near Jerusalem, in Mevaseret Zion.

== Media career ==
Witztum has been a journalist with the Israel Broadcasting Authority since 1971. He became chief foreign editor in 1972 and rejoined Israel Radio in 1977 upon return from England. In summer 1982 he was sent to Europe as Bureau Chief and Correspondent in Europe for IBA Television and Radio, stationed in Bonn, Federal Republic of Germany (till 1985). In 1987 he moved to television as Chief Foreign Editor, Israel Public Television (Channel 1) and in 1988 became the first Moderator and Editor of the weekly foreign newsmagazine Roim Olam which started August 20, 1988. In 1991 he joined Yedioth Aharonoth, Israel's largest daily newspaper, as commentator on Foreign Affairs. As of 1994 – he serves as chief editor, commentator on foreign affairs and moderator of news and culture programs at the News division, Israeli Television (Channel 1) with responsibility to the nightly news program MeHayom LeMahar (From Today to Tomorrow), along with Emmanuel Halperin, and as moderator of the weekly news and culture program Globus.

He has directed and moderated various documentary films, among them: The Nahariyade (2004) German-Jewish History (1996), (both in Hebrew and German versions), From Bittburg to Berlin (1985), The German Green Movement (1984), Germany and Its Past (1983), and many others on Jewish history (e.g. Po-Lan-Ya – the 1000-year history of Polish Jewry, a 7 parts television documentary, 1999), German history and politics, and classical music.

From 1995, he has taught at the Hebrew University, Jerusalem (German History and Communication studies), Tel Aviv University (Political Science and Communication Studies) Open University and other institutions in Israel and abroad.

His book Mahadura Meyuhedet ["Special Edition"] explores Israeli and worldwide television coverage of terrorism and the social role of this coverage.

== Published works ==
=== Books ===
- The Beginning of a Wondrous Friendship? The story of Israeli-German reconciliation 1948-1960, Schocken Publishing House, Tel Aviv, December 2018
- Breaking News – Television news in hard times (Hebrew), Keter Publishing House, Jerusalem 2006
- Mahadura Meyuhedet ("Special Newscast") (Hebrew)

=== Articles ===
- "A Political avoidance of Tragedy": Israel-German Relations, in: Shahran Chubin (ed.): Germany and the Middle East: Patterns and Prospects, Pinter, London 1992. (English) pp. 55 – 92.
- Israeli Media: Engagierte Medien - kämpferische Medien, (German) in: Kultur in Israel; eine Einführung. Anat Feinberg (ed.), Gerlingen: Bleicher Verlag, 1993, pp. 207 – 229.
- Ernst Nolte, the Holocaust and Today's Extremism, in SoWi-Sozial-Wissenschaftliche Informationen, heft 1/1993, (German).
- The Israeli Media and Germany, in Zimmermann M. (ed.): Normal Relations: 25 Years of Israeli-German Relations. (Hebrew) Magnes Press, Jerusalem 1994, pp. 103 – 128.
- Image and Reality: Israeli Media and Germany, (German: Realität und Image; die bilateralen Beziehungen) in H. Lichtenstein, O. R. Romberg (eds.): Füenfzig Jahre Israel: Vision und Wirklichkeit, Bonn 1998, pp. 244–254. Appeared also in Tribüne; Zeitschrift zum Verständnis des Judentums. Frankfurt a.M. no. 146 (1998), pp. 216 – 228, English version in: From Vision to Reality, Bundeszentrale für politische Bildung, Bonn 1998
- "Conservative Revolutionaries": Composers and Music in the Third Reich, (Hebrew) in M. Zimmermann (ed.): The Third Reich, a Historical Balance, Magnes Press, Jerusalem 1999, pp. 158–177.
- The Image of Germany in Israel, (in German – "Gegenwaert und Gedaechtnis"), with M. Zimmermann), in Krauts – Fritz – Piefkes…? – in: Deutschland von aussen, Haus der Geschichte der Bundesrepublik Deutschland (ed.) Bonn 1999, pp. 132–139.
- Die jüdischen Grundpositionen zu Jerusalem und den Heiligen Stätten, (German), In: Provokation Jerusalem; eine Stadt im Schnittpunkt von Religion und Politik: Konkel M. And Schuegraf O. (eds.), Münster: Aschendorff, 2000 pp. 143–155
- Shifts in Israeli society (English): in Alfred Witttstock (ed.): Israel in Nahost – Deutschland in Europa: Nahstellen. Westdeutscher Verlag, Wiesbaden, Germany 2001, pp. 187–194.
- The Israeli - Palestinian Conflict: The Role of the Media (English and German), in: Media, Conflict and Terrorism, Die Deutsche Stiftung für internationale Entwicklung (DSE), Bonn 2002. Also in: https://web.archive.org/web/20041023152050/http://www.dse.de/ef/media/witzthum.htm#top
- The Television News Report and History, in: History and Cinema – Dangerous Relationships? Bereshit H., Zand S. and Zimmermann M. (eds.), Shazar Center, Jerusalem 2004 (Hebrew), pp. 169–197.
- Israeli-German Relations: the role of the Media (Hebrew), in M. Zimmermann (ed.): Germany and the land of Israel, a Cultural Encounter, Magnes Press, Jerusalem, Israel 2004, pp. 188–216.
- The Media, Israel and Europe (English), in Bertelsmann Stiftung Seminar Papers 2004, Guetersloh and Jerusalem (forthcoming).
- Die israelisch-palästinensische Konfrontation und ihre Widerspiegelung in der öffentlichen Meinung Israels (German), in: Aus Politik und Zeitgeschichte, B 20/2004 Berlin, pp. 29–37. Also in http://www.bpb.de/publikationen/DFO8Y1,0,Die_israelischpal%E4stinensische_Konfrontation_und_ihre_Widerspiegelung_in_der_%F6ffentlichen_Meinung_Israels.html
- Deutsche Presse in hebräischer Sprache: Drei Wenden und ihre Bedeutung, in: Zimmermann M., Hotam Y., (eds.): Zweimal Heimat: Die Jeckes zwischen Mitteleuropa und Nahost (German), Beerenverlag, Frankfurt a.M. 2005 pp. 287–294. (also in The same book in Hebrew).
- "Der lange Weg zur politischen Vernunft: Joschka Fischers Welterklärung und deutsche Nahost-Politik" (book review), in Internationale Politik, Berlin, (German) vol. 60 (2005) no.8 pp. 128–130.
- "Nahariyade": in Gisela Dachs (ed.): Die Jeckes, Jüdischer Almanach des Leo Baeck Instituts: Jüdischer Verlag im Suhrkamp, (German) Frankfurt a.M. 2005, pp. 79–85.
- "History and the Moving Picture", in Hotam y. Schmidt M. and Zadoff N. (eds.): History as Vocation, a collection of essays in honor of Moshe Zimmermann on the occasion of his 60th birthday, Magnes Press (Hebrew), Jerusalem 2006, pp. 57–64.
- Israels medien in Zeiten der Not, (German), in: Aus Politik Und Zeitgeschichte no. 17/2008, Berlin, also in: http://www.bpb.de/publikationen/SC0B5O,0,Israels_Medien_in_Zeiten_der_Not.html

== See also ==
- MeHayom LeMahar
- Television in Israel
