= Natan Zahavi =

Israeli film producer and film editor

- נתן זהבי
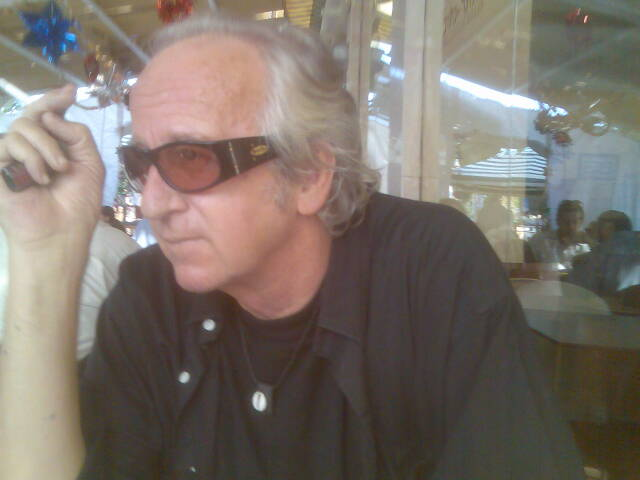
- Born: October 27, 1946 (age 78); Tel Aviv, Mandatory Palestine
- Occupation(s): Journalist, radio personality
- Years active: 1961–present
- Awards: Sokolov Award

Natan Zahavi ׂ(Hebrew: נתן זהבי; born October 27, 1946) is a journalist, radio broadcaster on station 103FM, actor and Israeli film producer. In 2000, he won the Sokolov Award.

== Biography ==
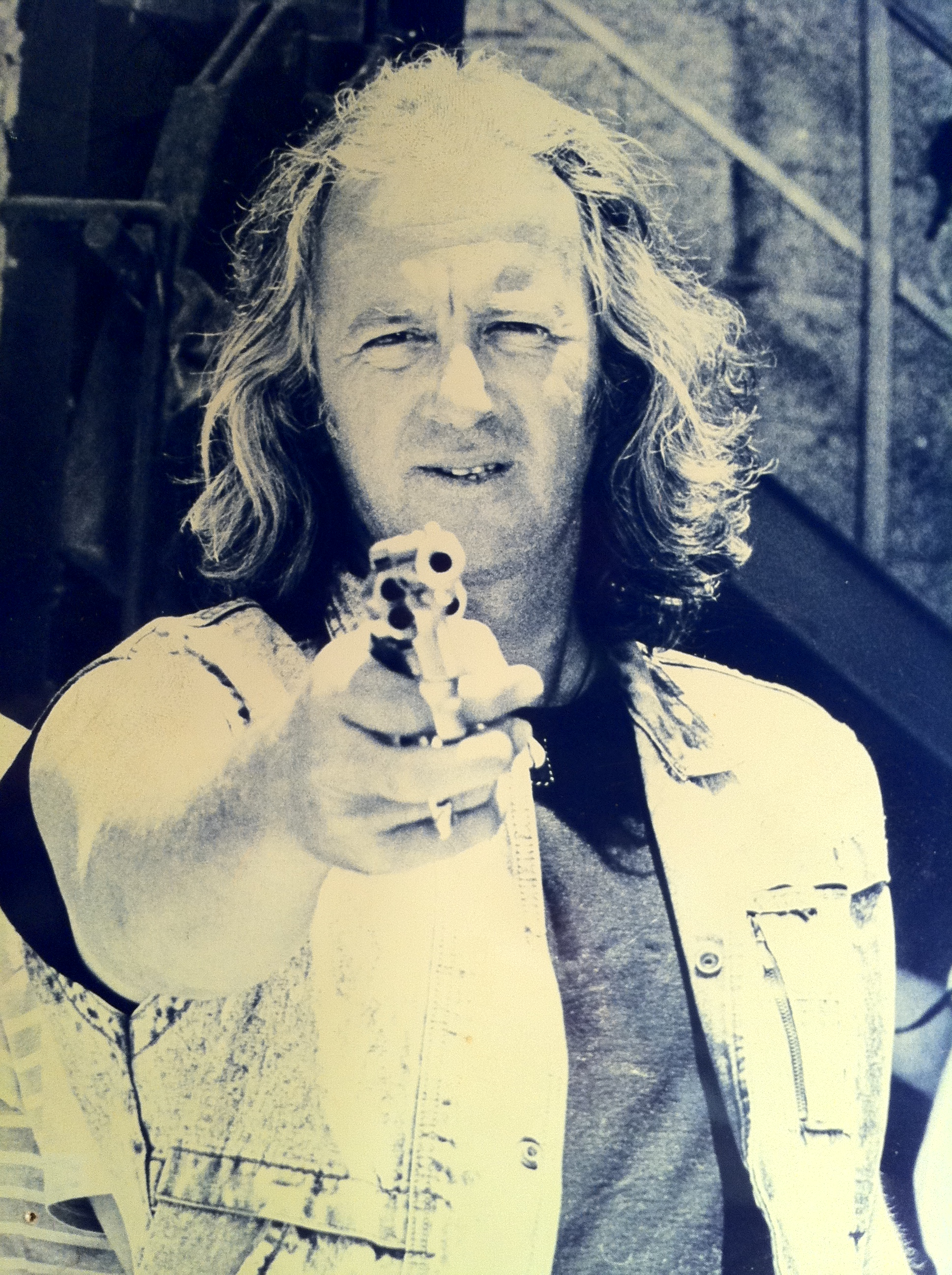
1991

Zahavi was born and raised in Tel Aviv. He is the son of Yaakov and Sara Zahavi and the younger brother of editor and literary critic Alex Zahavi and scientist Avinoam Zahavi. The family changed their name from Goldwitz to Zahavi when they immigrated to Israel. His father, Yaakov Zahavi (1903–2005), immigrated to Israel in 1925, at the end of the Fourth Aliyah. The rest of the father's family perished in the Holocaust. Zahavi studied at Mount Nebo Folk School. He completed only eight years of schooling, and according to his description he has a "Mediterranean education".

He began his journalistic career at the age of 15 as a photojournalist and football reporter. At the age of 17, he began to photograph and write for the weekly "Ha'Olam Hez". During a demonstration near the Knesset, he confronted Knesset guards who tried to prevent him from taking pictures. In another case, he confronted Miriam Eshkol's bodyguards who wanted to prevent him from photographing her in a clothing store in Tel Aviv. In his youth he participated in the May Day demonstrations as well as demonstrations for Jewish-Arab brotherhood. He also collaborated with the "Black Panthers" movement. Zahavi did not serve regular service in the IDF. During his residence in Sinai, he served as a liaison officer to the United Nations at the rank of representative captain.

In his youth, he got into trouble several times with law enforcement in different countries. In 1966 he was tried in Chicago, Illinois, for attacking the leader of the American Nazi Party, George Lincoln Rockwell. In 1968, he was arrested in the "Kishon" detention center in Haifa, after meeting as a journalist with Fatah members in Bulgaria, an action that was prohibited by Israeli law at the time. Ultimately, there was no trial and Zahavi was released. Since this was the first meeting between an Israeli journalist and representatives of Fatah, all the photos and the contents of the conversations between Zahavi and the Fatah representatives were transferred to security services. In 1972, he spent about two months in detention in Frankfurt, Germany, as a suspect in a diamond robbery, but was released after the police there received his explanations. Zahavi described in an interview with the Pnai Plus tabloid in 2002 that he decided to "leave the crime and do things to atone for what I did".

== Journalism career and public activism ==
Between 1977 and 1982 he lived in Ofira and was a reporter for Galei Tzahal in the south of Israel. Zahavi was evacuated from Ofira after the Egypt–Israel peace treaty. For the next two years he was a columnist in Yedioth Ahronoth.

In 1989, he moved to become the editor of the monthly magazine "Monaytin", until it was sold in June 1990. In 1990, he claims, he coined the slogan "the corrupt are fed up", following the political affair that was nicknamed "The dirty trick". The slogan first appeared on the front page of the newspaper as a paid advertisement, and was later distributed in banners all over the country. Two years later, it was used in the Alignment election campaign with the publication of the state audit report about a month and a half before the 1992 elections.

== Personal life ==
Zahavi resides in Tel Aviv, and has chosen to remain unmarried and childless throughout his life, a decision he attributes to voluntary childlessness. He identifies as an atheist. He was a close friend of Dan Ben-Amotz, who stated in his Last Will and Testament that Zahavi "would receive a bottle of fine whiskey every month". Zahavi has expressed his wish that, after his death, his body be cremated and his ashes preserved in a jar of honey.
