= Guy Peleg =

Israeli journalist, publicist, and commentator (born 1969)

- גיא פלג
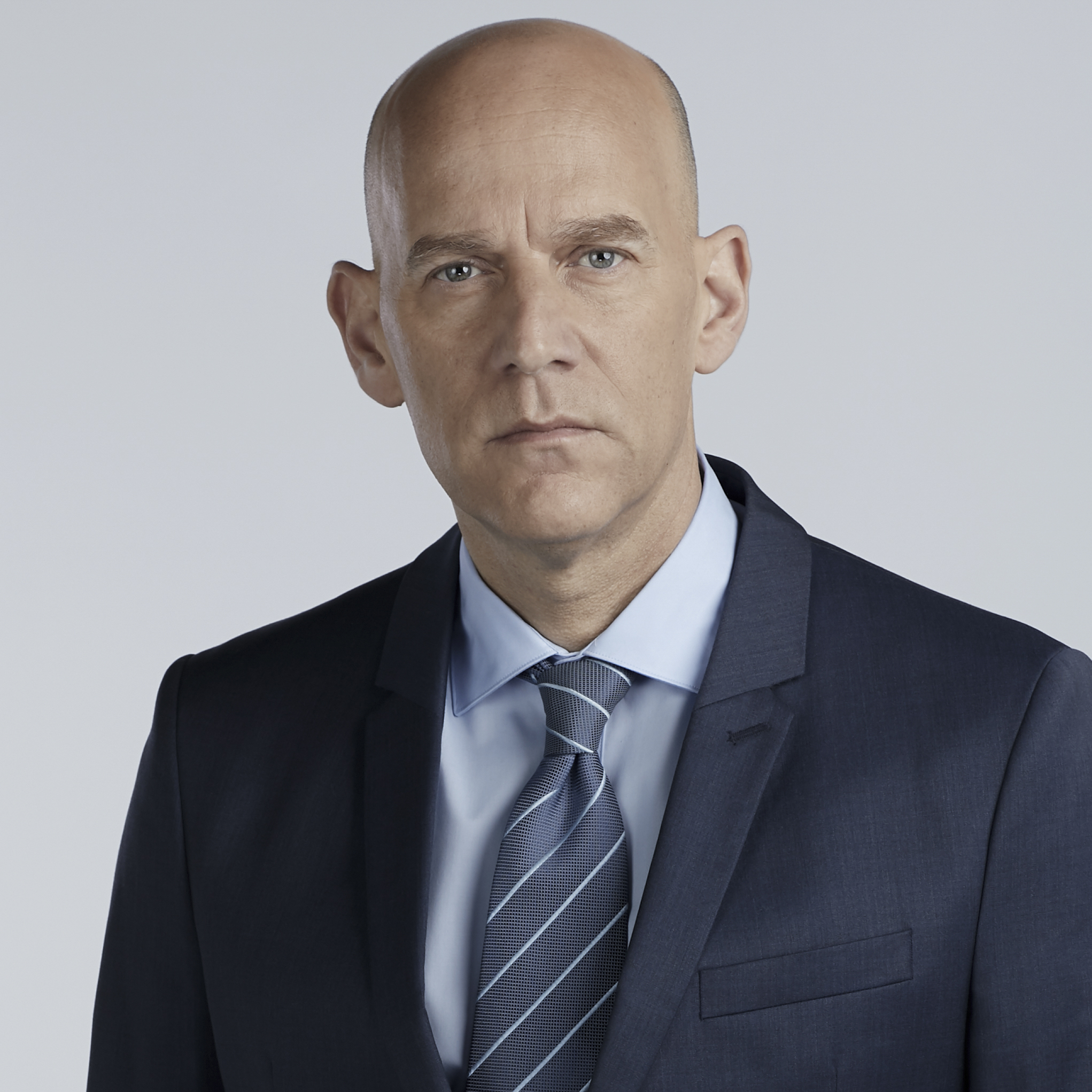
- Guy Peleg, 2020
- Born: November 6, 1969 (age 56); Haifa, Israel
- Education: University of Haifa
- Occupations: journalist; publicist; writer; commentator
- Years active: 1995–present
- Known for: journalism
- Awards: Sokolov Award (2023); Knight of the Order of Quality of Government (2019)

Guy Peleg (Hebrew: גיא פלג; born November 6, 1969) is an Israeli journalist, publicist, writer, and commentator who covers legal matters on Israeli Channel 12 News.

== Biography ==
Peleg was born to Yaakov and Shoshana and grew up in Haifa, in the Carmelia neighborhood, and attended the city's Municipal High School No. 5.

He began his career in journalism as a local reporter and as a spokesman for Maccabi Haifa. He later served as a news reporter on Haifa television, after replacing Amos Carmeli. In 1995, he joined the Broadcasting Authority. He was a police reporter on Channel One, replacing Ayala Hasson, until 2007. As part of his work, he obtained exclusive interviews with key figures in the world of organized crime in Israel, including Shoni Gabrieli, François Abutbol, and others. In parallel with his work on Channel One, he served as a reporter for the "7 Yamim" supplement of the newspaper "Yediot Aharonot".

In 2006, Peleg was in advanced talks to move to Channel 10, but eventually moved to serve as a legal correspondent for Channel 2 News in 2007, replacing Sivan Rahav-Meir.

Peleg regularly expresses his opinion on current legal issues on the radio program "Mishal al-Boker" broadcast on "103fm" and also hosts a talk show with listeners on the same station on Tuesdays and Wednesdays. He lectures at various forums on legal and criminal matters, including Israel's organized crime and trials of Israeli politicians.

=== Exclusive news articles published ===
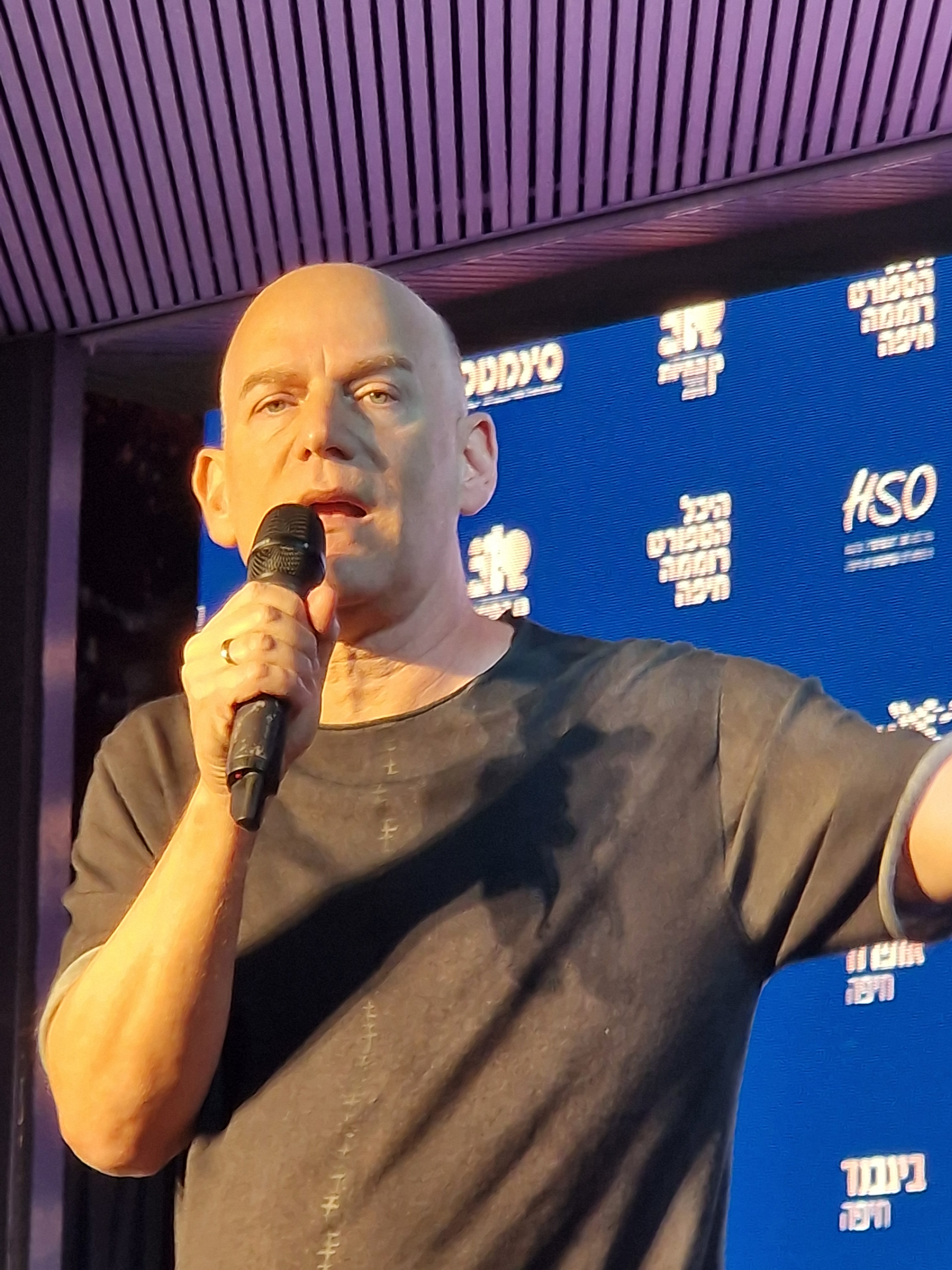
Guy Peleg at an event at the Haifa auditorium entitled "We Will Not Be Silenced", December 2025

During his career, Peleg published numerous scoops and exclusive news, including exclusive interviews, which were sometimes later published in other media outlets without giving him credit for the initial publication. In 2014, he published 20 exclusive pieces of news. Among the pieces of news he published first:

- A secret report by the Israel Police from 2003, according to which six organized crime organizations operate in Israel.
- The last interview given by Dudu Topaz before his arrest, in which he addressed rumors against him.
- Images from a security camera that recorded Arik Karp running away from his attackers before they killed him.
- Opening of a criminal investigation into the "social games" affair (without publishing his name due to a gag order). He later published that 4 girls who testified against Eyal Golan in this affair were interrogated on suspicion of perjury.
- The decision to close the Emanuel Rosen case despite the police's recommendation.
- Signing of a plea agreement between the State Attorney's Office and Danny Dankner.
- Signing of a plea deal between the State Attorney's Office and Dr. Maria Zakotsky, an anesthesiologist, who provided the murderer Shimon Cooper with a lethal anesthetic, which was allegedly used to murder his second wife.
- The lawsuit of Meni Naftali, the head of the household, against Sara Netanyahu.
- Guy Eliyahu's lawsuit against Sara Netanyahu.
- Police investigation into suspicion that MK Binyamin Ben-Eliezer demanded another million shekels from businessman Ron Motzfi, in addition to the money he received from him.
- Exclusive interview with Rabbi Eliezer Berland when he was arrested in the Netherlands on suspicion of sex crimes in Israel.
- Details of the incriminating transcripts of conversations between Rabbi Yoshiyahu Pinto and Lieutenant General Ephraim Bracha.
- Documentation of the shootout at Rimonim Prison that ended in the death of prisoner Samuel Sheinbein.
- The case of the seizure of $570,000 in cash from Benjamin Ben-Eliezer's safe.
- In 2019, during the election campaign for the twenty-second Knesset, he published a lot of information about things said in investigations into Benjamin Netanyahu's case. These revelations led to harsh criticism of him by Netanyahu, and out of concern for his safety, a security guard from the news company was assigned to him.
- In 2024, during the Gaza war, he released a video that he said proved that IDF soldiers had committed acts of rape and abuse against a Palestinian prisoner in the Sde Teiman detention camp.

=== Legal disputes ===
Following an interview Peleg conducted with Einat Harel, known as the "Madame of Tel Aviv," and accused of pimping for prostitution and laundering tens of millions of shekels, the Israel Police sought to compel Channel 2 News to provide it with the raw material from the interview. The news company refused and went to court, which accepted its position and ruled that journalistic confidentiality should also apply to information collected by a journalist in the course of his work and not published.

In 2016, he called lawyer Avital Ben-Nun, who represented a complainant against Ofek Buchris, a "liar," and claimed that she had manipulated him. The court ruled that his statements were incorrect and that Peleg had not investigated whether this was true, and therefore he must compensate the plaintiff with 15,000 NIS.

Following a defamation lawsuit that Peleg filed in 2020 against an Ashkelon resident, for posts she published on a social network in which she called him a "sex offender" and a "rapist", the woman was ordered to compensate him with approximately 600,000 NIS. Additionally, a defamation lawsuit filed by Peleg against Facebook users who called him a "Gestapo officer" and even mocked his appearance with the nickname "Dumbo" was ruled in Peleg's favor in March 2022, and as a result, the users were ordered to compensate him in a total amount of approximately 350,000 NIS.

In November 2023, MK Simcha Rothman, chair of the Knesset Constitution Committee, filed a defamation lawsuit against Peleg and against Avi Weiss, CEO of News 12. The lawsuit stated that Peleg falsely attributed a statement to the effect that "the blood of the Hillel and Yaniv brothers who were murdered in Huwara is redder than the blood of those murdered on October 7," a statement that was denied by Rothman.

In November 2024, Peleg, together with the news company, filed a lawsuit for 1 million NIS against Yinon Magal for allegedly false and defamatory publications. According to the lawsuit, Magal published false publications on social media claiming that Peleg had been arrested by the Shin Bet for his journalistic work and was held for about a week in a Shin Bet interrogation facility in a case on which a gag order had been imposed.

Following a defamation lawsuit filed by Peleg, in July 2025, Eliran Dahan was ordered to pay Peleg compensation of 144,000 NIS, plus legal costs of 35,000 NIS.

In April 2025, the fighters of "Force 100" filed a defamation lawsuit against Peleg for 1.5 million NIS, claiming that he had published a defamatory article regarding what became known as the "Sde Teiman Abuse Affair".

=== Awards and recognition ===
- The Knight of the Order of Quality of Government for 2019 from the Movement for Quality Government in Israel, in the category of "Communication and Journalism".
- The Sokolov Prize for Written and Electronic Media for 2023.
