= Avshalom Kor =

Israeli linguist and broadcaster

- אבשלום קור
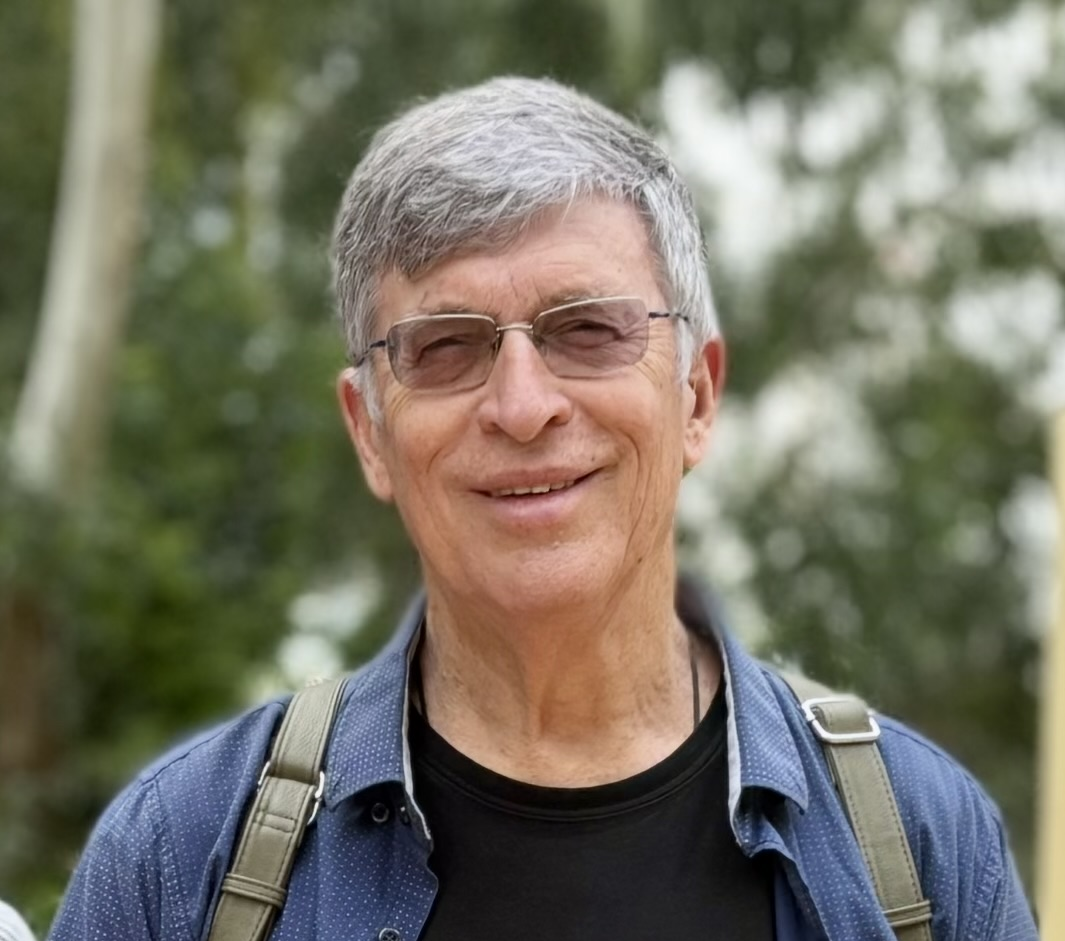
- Kor in 2024
- Born: 17 September 1950 (age 76); Tel Aviv, Israel
- Education: Tel Aviv University
- Occupations: Linguist; radio broadcaster; television presenter
- Awards: Sokolov Award

Avshalom Kor (Hebrew: אבשלום קור; born 17 September 1950) is an Israeli linguist, radio broadcaster and television presenter. He studied Hebrew language and Semitic linguistics at Tel Aviv University. Kor has been associated with Galei Tzahal, the radio station of the Israel Defense Forces (IDF), since the 1970s, writing and presenting the long-running radio program Be'ofen Miluli ("Literally") and later the television program Higi'a Zman Lashon ("Time for Language"). He has also served as Galei Tzahal's language adviser.

From 1988 to 2022, Kor hosted the International Bible Contest for Jewish youth, with a brief interruption in 2016. He also hosted the separate Bible Quiz for Adults in 2010. He has served on the Government Naming Committee and Jerusalem's municipal naming committee. Kor received the Sokolov Award for electronic media in 1989 and the Prime Minister's Prize for the Hebrew Language in 2016. In 2018, he was selected as one of the ceremonial torchbearers for Israel's 70th Independence Day state ceremony.

== Early life and education ==
Avshalom Kor was born in Tel Aviv. He was named after his two grandfathers, Avraham and Shalom, with his given name combining elements of both. Kor has said that his paternal grandfather was killed in the burning of the Great Choral Synagogue in Riga during World War II.

His father, Shlomo Kor, was active in Betar, a Revisionist Zionist youth movement, among Holocaust survivors in postwar Germany. After immigrating to Israel, he worked for Ma'ariv, where Azriel Carlebach appointed him head of the newspaper's advertising department; he later became deputy chairman of the Israel Broadcasting Authority.

Avshalom Kor began reporting for the Israeli youth weekly Ma'ariv LaNoar at age 13 and also worked as an interviewer on the state-run Israeli Educational Television network. He later studied at Tel Aviv University through Atuda, the academic reserve program of the Israel Defense Forces (IDF), where he completed a bachelor's degree in Hebrew language and Semitic linguistics with highest honors. His teacher, the linguist Aron Dotan, encouraged him to continue directly toward doctoral studies, but Kor chose instead to complete his military service, during which he served as an officer in the Armored Corps.

Afterward, he pursued a master's degree in Hebrew language and worked as an assistant in introductory courses at Tel Aviv University. His master's research concerned the Hebrew Tijan, the traditional grammar of Yemenite Jewry. His doctoral dissertation examined the piyyutim (Jewish liturgical poems) of Yannai, a Jewish liturgical poet who lived in Palestine in the sixth century, as evidence for the Hebrew used in the Land of Israel under Byzantine rule.

== Career ==
During the 1970s and 1980s, Kor appeared on several Israeli radio and television programs, including Latzon Nofel al Latzon, Ot Ve'od, and Pitzuchim. Kor began working at Galei Tzahal as a reporter and news editor, and before long was editing news broadcasts. In 1977, he began writing and presenting Be'ofen Miluli ("Literally") on Galei Tzahal. The program examines Hebrew vocabulary, linguistic phenomena, and changes in both spoken and written Hebrew across different historical periods. Beginning in 1985, Kor gave Hebrew-language courses to people accepted to work at the station. Kor has served as Galei Tzahal's language adviser for several decades. In 1987, Kor began writing and presenting the television counterpart, Higi'a Zman Lashon ("Time for Language"), which ran until 2006. Be'ofen Miluli continues to air, with Kor as its presenter.

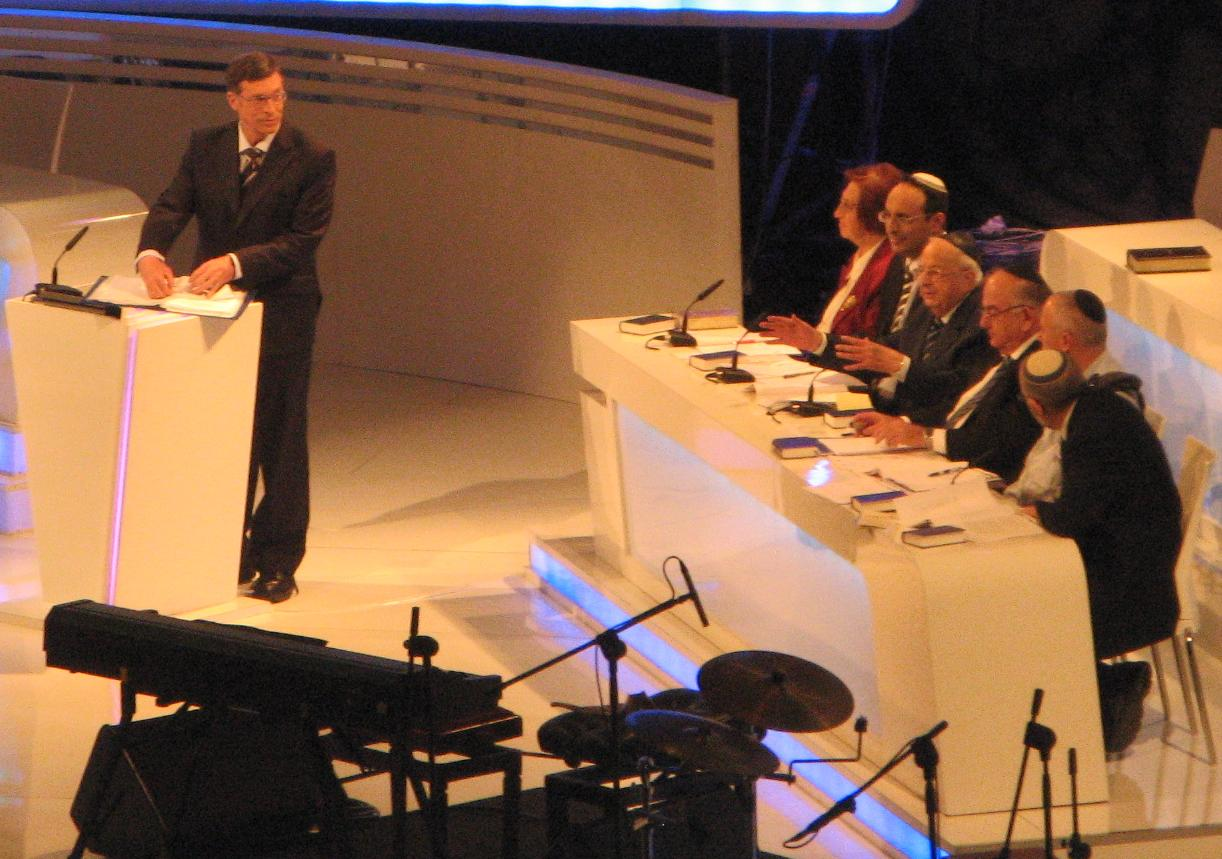
Kor at the Bible Quiz for Adults in 2010

Kor hosted the International Bible Contest, an annual Bible competition for Jewish youth, beginning in 1988, with a one-year interruption in 2016. He returned as host in 2017 and retired from the role in 2022. He has also hosted the International Bible Quiz for Adults, a separate competition from the International Bible Contest for Jewish youth, including in 2013, 2016 and 2019. Kor has served as a presenter at official state ceremonies.

In 1989, Kor taught at an advanced seminar for Hebrew teachers in Moscow, which brought together teachers from across the Soviet Union. One of the participants was Ze'ev Elkin, then a young Hebrew teacher from Kharkiv, who later became a member of the Knesset, Israel's parliament, and a cabinet minister. Elkin later recalled that Kor taught the advanced group.

Kor is also a member of the Government Naming Committee. In 2016, he was appointed to Jerusalem's municipal naming committee, where he advised on Hebrew spelling and explanatory text for street names.

In 2022, Kor gave a lecture entitled "Ambiguity in Ancient and Modern Hebrew" at UNESCO headquarters in Paris as part of the symposium Hebrew as a Treasure of Human Heritage: Past, Present and Future.

== Awards and recognition ==
- In 1989, Kor received the Sokolov Award for electronic media.
- In 1990, he received the Golden Apple Award in the Jewish Heritage category, based on a vote of radio and television license-fee payers.
- In 2016, he received the Prime Minister's Prize for the Hebrew Language.
- In 2018, he was selected as one of the ceremonial torchbearers for Israel's 70th Independence Day state ceremony.

== Selected works ==
- לצונו של אדם־כבודו (Letsono shel adam-kevodo). Tel Aviv: Sifriyat Ma'ariv, 1980.
- קור קורא במדבר (Kor kore ba-midbar). Tel Aviv: Sifriyat Ma'ariv, 1981.
- בלצון רב (Be-latson rav). Tel Aviv: Sifriyat Ma'ariv, 1983.
- יופי של עברית (Yofi shel Ivrit). Tel Aviv: Sifriyat Ma'ariv and Ministry of Defense Publishing House, 1986.
- הגיע זמן לשון (Higi'a zeman lashon). Kinneret, 1994.

== Bibliography ==
- Efrati, Nathan (2010). העברית בראי המדינה: מעמדה הציבורי של העברית מאז ייסוד המדינה [Hebrew in the Mirror of the State: The Public Status of Hebrew Since the Establishment of the State] (in Hebrew). Jerusalem: Academy of the Hebrew Language.
- Sivertsev, Alexei M. (2024). Jews, Christians, and the Discourse on Images before Iconoclasm. Cambridge: Cambridge University Press. doi:10.1017/9781009424578. ISBN 978-1-009-42453-0.
