= Ruth Bondy =

Czech-Israeli journalist and translator (1923–2017)

- רות בונדי
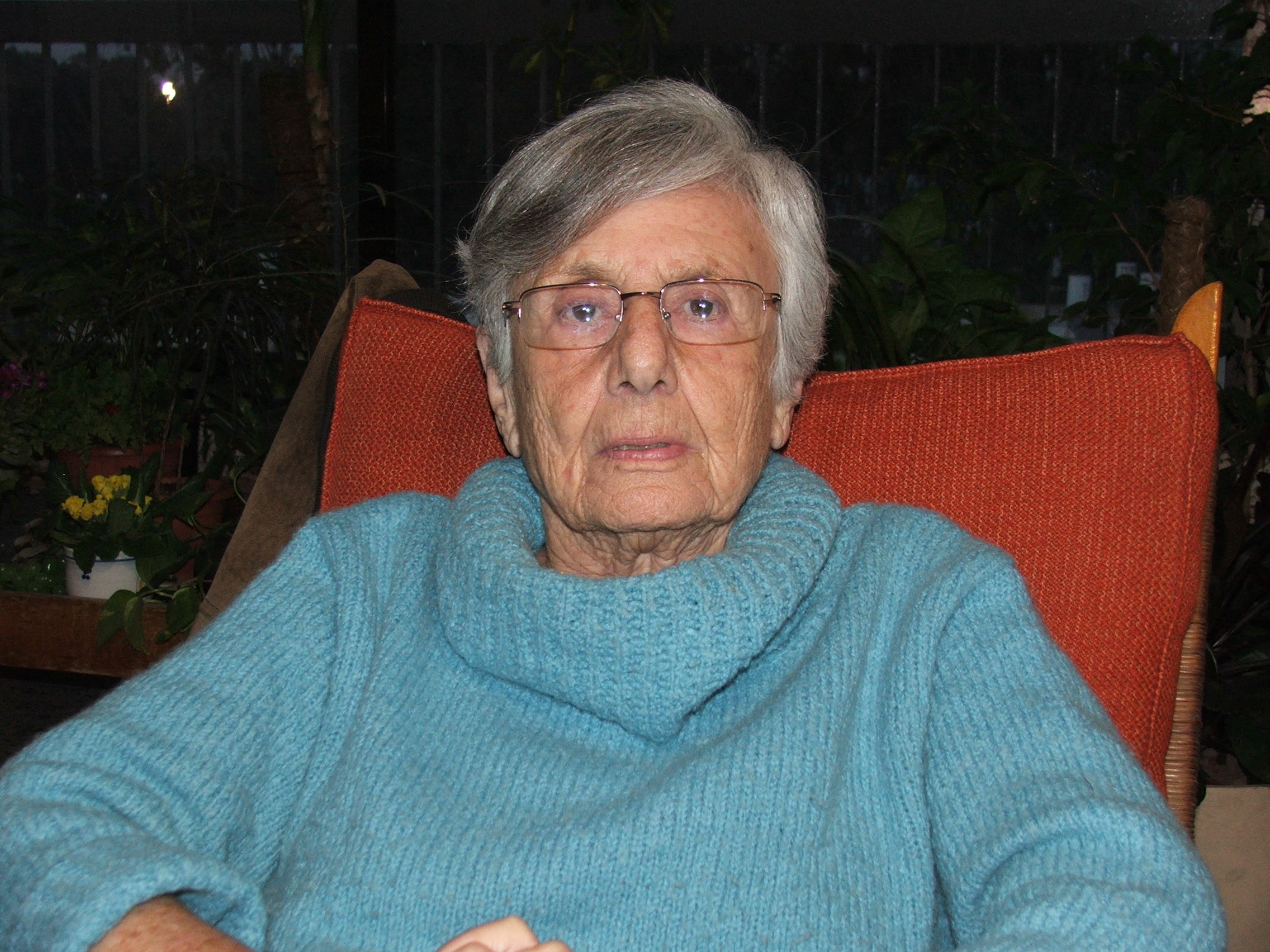
- Born: Ruth Bondyova; 19 June 1923; Prague, Czechoslovakia
- Died: 14 November 2017 (aged 94); Ramat Gan, Israel
- Occupations: journalist, translator
- Notable work: The Emissary: The Life of Enzo Sereni (1976)
- Awards: Sokolov Award (1987) Tchernichovsky Prize (2014)

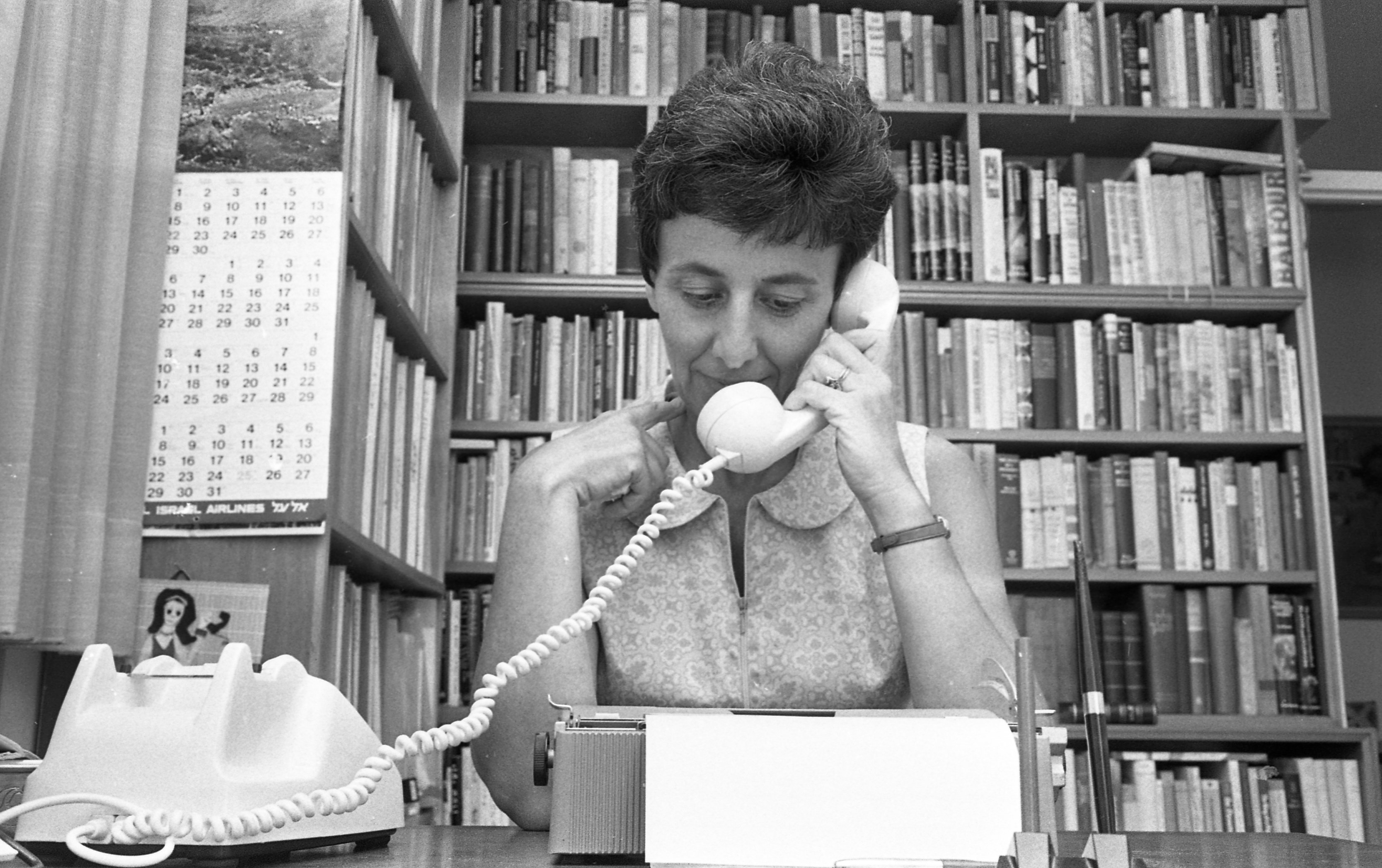
Ruth Bondy, 1969

Ruth Bondy (Hebrew: רות בונדי; 19 June 1923 – 14 November 2017) was a Czech-Israeli journalist and translator. Bondy was a Holocaust survivor who wrote for the Israeli newspaper Davar and translated books written in Czech to Hebrew. She was awarded the Sokolov Award in 1987 and the Tchernichovsky Prize in 2014.

== Early life and education ==
Bondy was born on 19 June 1923 in Prague, Czechoslovakia. She studied literature and journalism in Czechoslovakia and was a member of a Zionist group as a teenager.

== Career ==
Bondy began her career as a translator for the UP News Agency in the 1940s. During the Holocaust, Bondy was sent to Theresienstadt in 1942 and Birkenau in 1943. After the end of World War II, Bondy trained in the military as a volunteer and moved to Haifa, Israel in 1948. After arriving in Israel, Bondy was a journalist for the Israeli newspaper Davar before working for the news magazine Devar ha-Shavua and the newspaper Omer in 1953. She remained in journalism for over thirty years and taught at Tel Aviv University.

Outside of journalism, Bondy translated Czech books into Hebrew and wrote multiple biographies including ones about Jakob Edelstein and Pinchas Rosen. Her 1976 book The Emissary: The Life of Enzo Sereni won the Yitzhak Sadeh Prize.

== Awards and honours ==
In 1967, Bondy was the first woman to be awarded the Sokolov Award. In 2014, she was honoured with the Tchernichovsky Prize. Other awards Bondy was given include the Jiri Theiner and Gratias Agit awards.

== Death ==
On 14 November 2017 Bondy died in Ramat Gan, Israel.

== Personal life ==
Bondy had one daughter with her husband Raphael Bashan and remained married until their divorce in 1981.

== Works ==
- The Emissary: The Life and Death of Enzo Sereni (1973)
- Small Comforts (1975)
- Felix: Pinhas Rosen and his Time (1980)
- Chaim Sheba: Physician for All People (1981)
- Signed and Sealed: A Guide to Journalistic Writing (1982)
- Elder of the Jews: Jacob Edelstein of Theresienstadt (1989)
- Whole Fragments (1997)
- Uprooted Roots (2002)
- Trapped: Essays on the History of the Czech Jews, 1939–1945 (2008)
- Not just Kafka and the Golem : In Names, Food and Language: The History of Czech Jews with a Personal Perspective (2014, in Hebrew)

=== Translations ===
- The Good Soldier Schweik, by Jaroslav Hašek (1980)
- Immortality, by Milan Kundera (1991)
- Life with a Star by Jiří Weil (1991)
- Call Me Friend: The Children's Newspaper "Kamarad" from the Theresienstadt Ghetto, 1943–1944 (1998)
