= Roim Olam =

- רואים עולם
- Genre: News
- Presented by: Ya'akov Ahimeir
- Country of origin: Israel
- Original language: Hebrew

Production
- Producer: טובה ביאלה
- News editor: Ya'akov Ahimeir
- Production locations: Romema (1988–2017); Modi’in (2017–2020)
- Running time: 45 minutes
- Production companies: Israeli Broadcasting Authority (1988–2017); Israeli Public Broadcasting Corporation (2017–2020)

Original release
- Network: Channel 1
- Release: 20 August 1988 – 2017
- Network: Kan 11
- Release: 2017 – 1 February 2020

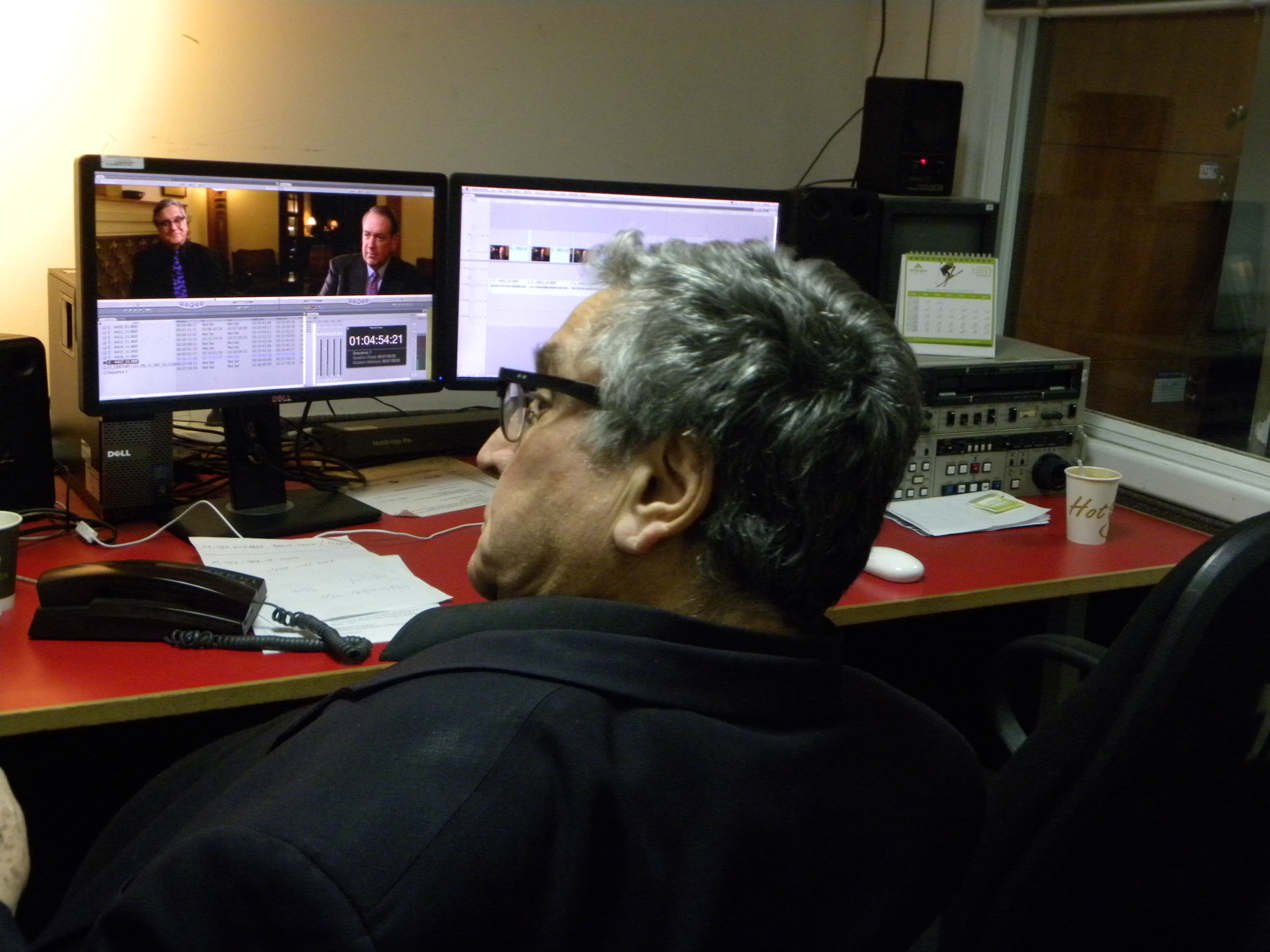
Yaakov Ahimeir working on an interview with Mike Huckabee for Roim Olam

Roim Olam (Hebrew: רואים עולם, lit. Seeing the World) was a weekly foreign news magazine broadcast every Shabat evening, lastly on Kan 11 at 21:05. It was produced by the Israel Broadcasting Authority (IBA) from 20 August 1988 to 2017 and broadcast on Israel public Television Channel 1, and then produced by the IPBC and broadcast on Kan 11 until the program was cancelled on 1 February 2020.

The show was initially presented by Emmanuel Halperin, and later by Ya'akov Ahimeir. Ahimeir presented the show for 30 years. The show opened with a news flash segment (usually presented by Dalia Mazor), and thereafter stories segments on various current affairs and culture matters from around the world are being broadcast. Many of the show's story segments were borrowed from foreign news magazines, many times from 60 Minutes, and from France 24 and more.
