= Razi Barkai =

Israeli media personality

Razi Barkai רזי ברקאי
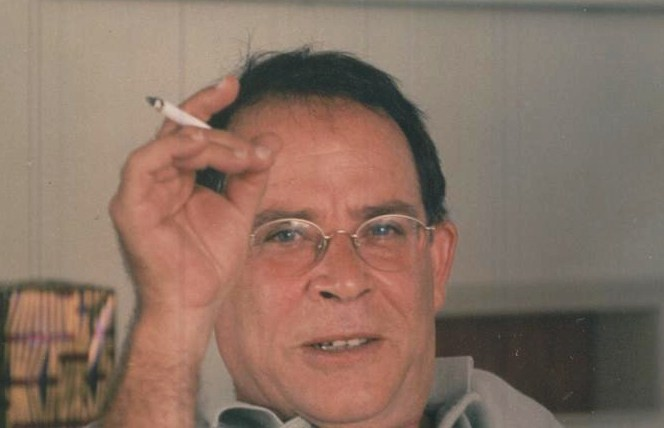
- Born: 24 February 1949 (age 77)
- Occupation: Journalism

Razi Barkai (Hebrew: רזי ברקאי; born 24 February 1949) is an Israeli media personality.

He was born in Holon to Rina and Shmuel Barkai (Barkovitz), who was the commander of the Tel Aviv district on behalf of the Haganah. He is a graduate of the 13th class of the military boarding school for command at the Reali School in Haifa.

In 1970, after his discharge from the army, he began working for the newspaper "Davar" and in June 1971 for Kol Yisrael. In 1977, he was appointed as the Kol Yisrael correspondent in the Knesset. Until 1983, he was the head of the political desk, and that year he became the radio envoy in Washington.

In 1986, Barkai returned to Israel and was appointed as a party affairs correspondent. In 1989, Barkai began hosting the program "Everything is Talk" which he founded. In 1993, after hosting seven editions of the program "Channel 1" on the first channel, he moved to Galei Tzahal and began hosting the evening journal and a current affairs program called "An Hour Before". In 1995, he began hosting the morning program "What's Burning" on the military station. In 1997, he moved to host the program "Media File" on the educational television.

In January 2022, Barkai announced his retirement from Galei Tzahal. On 26 January, he hosted the program for the last time. In August 2022, he returned to Galei Tzahal and hosts a weekly program on the station.

Married to Deborah and father to a son and a daughter. Resides in Kiryat Ono.

== Awards and honors ==
- In 1996, he asked his show's producer live on air to get him "the person in charge of the internet" on the phone. This statement has become "mythological" over the years and is quoted in the book "Taken Out of Context – The Punchlines of Israeli Media" (2004).
- The Sokolov Award for 2002, for professional achievements in radio and television.
- At the Radio Conference in 2008, he won the "Outstanding Radio Broadcaster Award in memory of Shosh Atari."
- The program "Ma Bo'er" hosted by him, won the IDF Radio Commander's Award for 2009.
- In 2011, he received the OMETZ Award.
