= Micha Kirshner =

- Born: 1947; Milan, Italy
- Died: September 11, 2017 (aged 70); Tel HaShomer, Israel
- Education: School of Visual Arts, New York City (1971–1975)
- Alma mater: School of Visual Arts
- Occupations: Photographer, Photojournalist, Educator, Curator
- Known for: Photography, Photojournalism, Staged Photography, Portraiture
- Movement: Post-modern photography (in Israel)
- Awards: Israel Museum Photography Prize (1988)

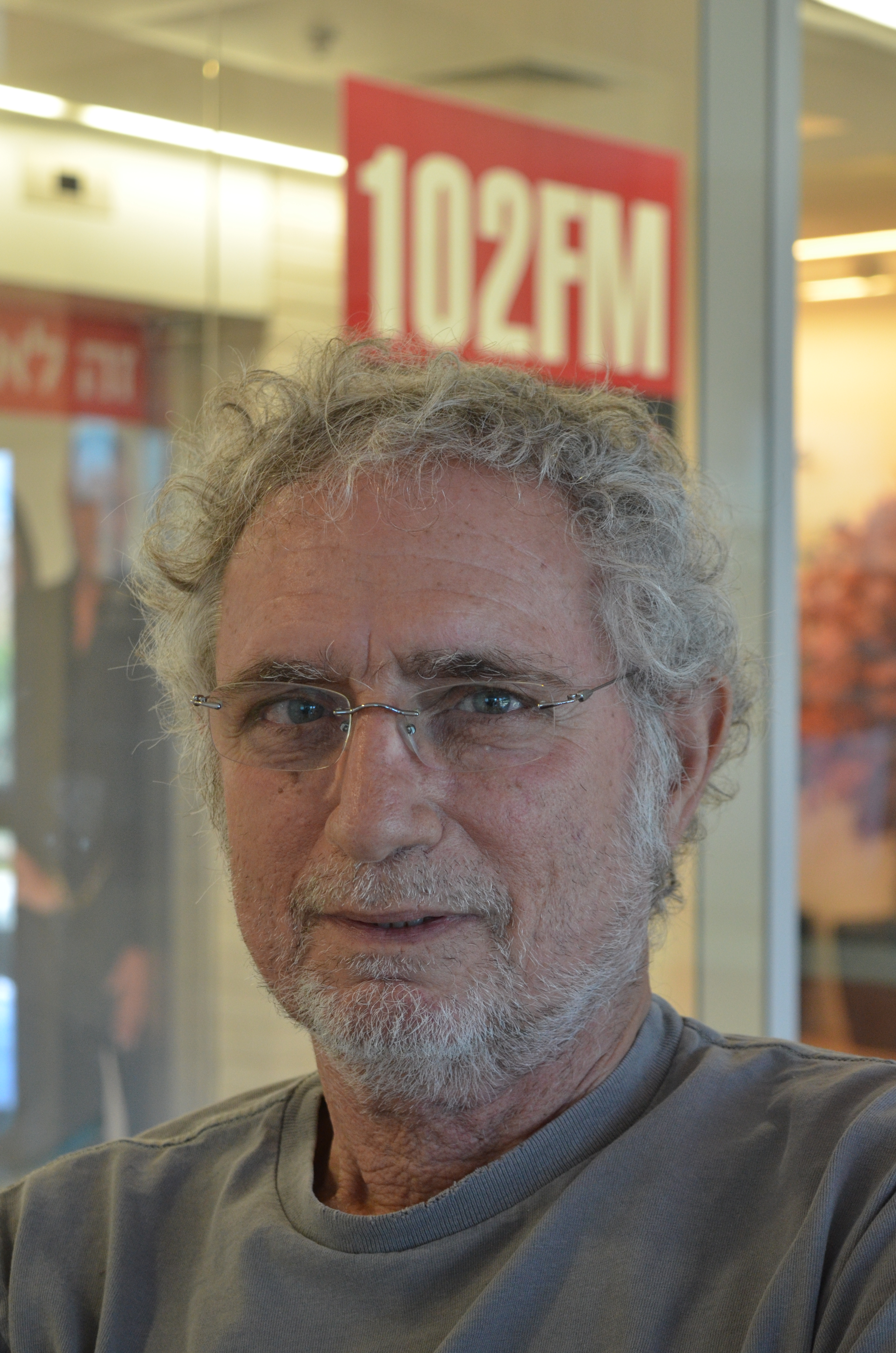
Micha Kirshner in the studio of the program "Journalist's Certificate” on Radio Tel Aviv, September 2015

Micha Kirshner (1947 – 11 September 2017) was an Israeli photographer and photojournalist known for his portraits of politicians, artists, and public figures in Israel. Working for leading newspapers and magazines, he developed a distinctive staged approach sometimes described as the “opinion portrait,” and later became a prominent teacher of photography and curator of the documentary exhibition “Local Testimony.”

== Early life and education ==
Kirshner was born in 1947 in Milan, Italy, to parents who had survived the Second World War and were awaiting permission to immigrate to Palestine. In 1948 the family moved to Israel, and he grew up in Ramat HaSharon, north of Tel Aviv.

Between 1971 and 1975 Kirshner studied photography and art in New York, where he was exposed to conceptual and documentary practices that were increasingly recognized within art schools and museums. This period of training shaped his later interest in constructed images and in the relationship between photographic realism and social critique.

== Career in photojournalism ==
After returning to Israel, Kirshner joined the staff of the monthly magazine Monitin, where he worked as a photographer from 1979 to 1988. For Monitin he produced portrait series of leading figures from politics, culture, and the arts, often constructing elaborate studio situations rather than relying on spontaneous reportage. From the mid‑1990s he contributed a regular photography column to the weekly edition of the newspaper Maariv, combining images and text to address current events and public personalities. In these assignments he continued to refine a visual language that blurred the boundaries between press photography, staged portraiture, and conceptual art.

== Style and “opinion portrait” ==
Kirshner’s work is frequently described by critics and curators as “opinion portraiture,” a term that refers to portraits that articulate the photographer’s viewpoint through composition, pose, and setting. Rather than present subjects as neutral figures, his images use costumes, props, and lighting to suggest commentary on power, gender, nationalism, and media imagery. One strand of his work focused on iconic Israeli public figures, such as politicians and entertainers, whose images he framed in ways that emphasized theatricality and performance. Another strand addressed marginalized or vulnerable subjects, including a series made during the First Intifada portraying Palestinians injured by Israeli security forces, which sparked debate about the ethics of representation and the role of empathy in news photography.

== Teaching and curatorial work ==
Kirshner was among the founding figures of the photography department at HaMidrasha School of Art, later part of Beit Berl College, where he taught and mentored several generations of Israeli photographers. Former students and institutional biographies credit him with integrating critical discussion of media images and political context into the study of studio and documentary photography. Beyond his teaching, Kirshner served as curator of “Local Testimony,” an annual exhibition of press photography held at the Eretz Israel Museum that surveys current events in Israel and the region. In this role he helped shape the selection and presentation of news images, emphasizing the subjective and interpretive aspects of photojournalism.

== Exhibitions and publications ==
Kirshner’s photographs have been exhibited in Israeli museums and galleries, including a solo exhibition at the Israel Museum in Jerusalem and a retrospective presentation of his work after his death. A televised feature on the retrospective described him as one of Israel’s most influential photographers and highlighted the breadth of his portraiture across politics, culture, and civil society. His long‑term series “The Israelis” was presented in print and exhibitions, bringing together portraits made over years of assignments for the press. In addition to magazine and newspaper work, his photographs have appeared in exhibition catalogues and books on Israeli art and photography.

== Awards and legacy ==
In 1988 Kirshner received the Israel Museum Photography Prize, recognizing his contribution to the development of Israeli photography. The award positioned him alongside other leading photographers in the country and helped consolidate his reputation within the museum field. Following his death in 2017, exhibitions, articles, and a foundation established in his name have revisited his work and teaching, emphasizing his dual role as an innovator in press portraiture and as an influential educator. Writers on Israeli art history now cite his “opinion portraits” as a formative chapter in the visual culture of Israel from the late twentieth century onward.

== Notes ==
- Maya Margit (2018-03-20). Exhibition spotlights Israeli photographer Micha Kirshner – via YouTube.
