= Local Testimony =

- עדות מקומית
- Country: Israel
- Location: Eretz Israel Museum (since 2009)
- Exhibited: Photojournalism, Documentary photography
- Organiser: Dana Wohlfeiler-Lalkin
- Website: www.edutmekomit.co.il/en/

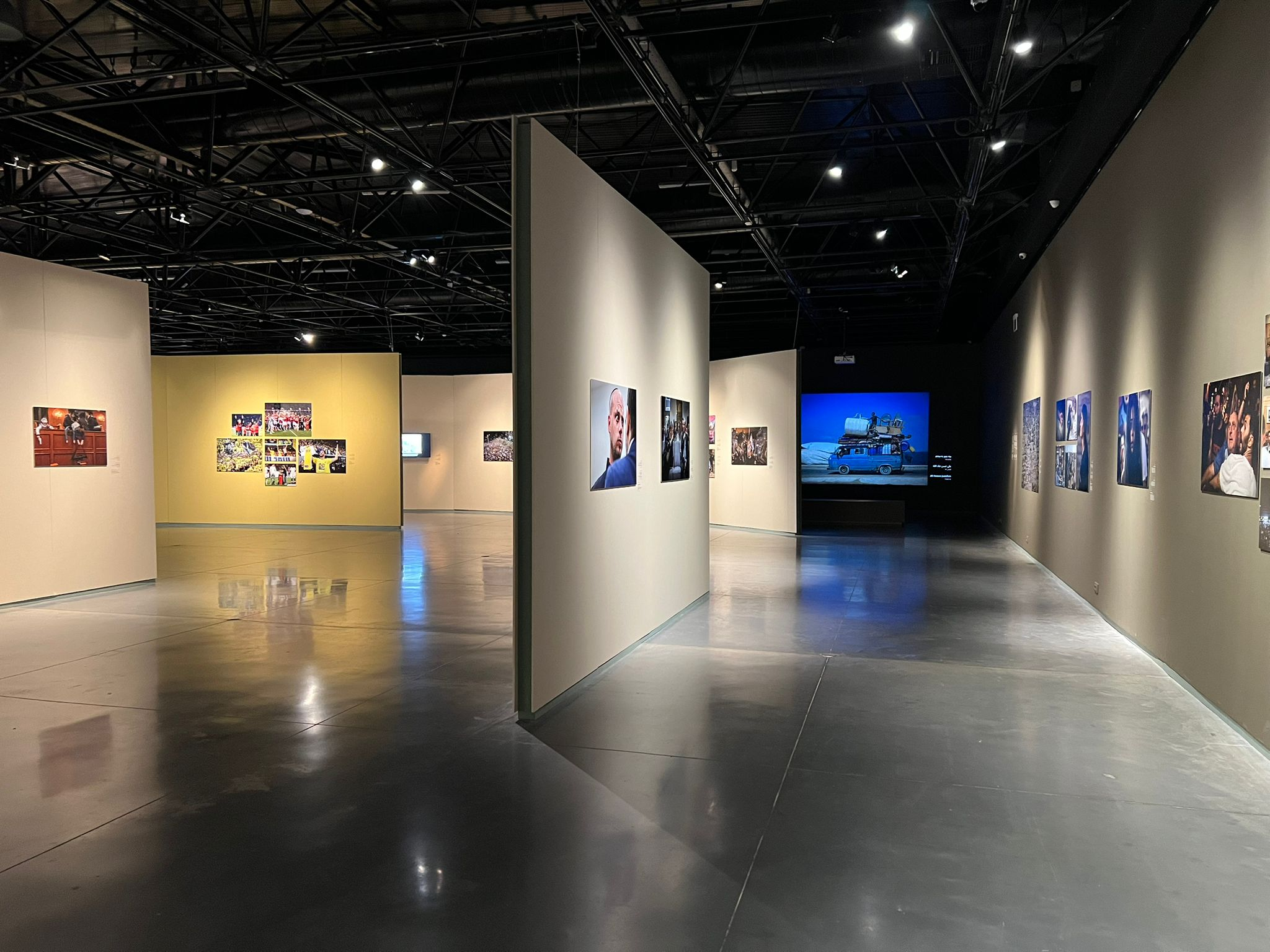
A photo of the 2025 Local Testimony exhibition

Local Testimony (Hebrew: Edut Mekomit) is the annual exhibition for photojournalism and documentary photography in Israel, displayed since 2003. The exhibition presents selected images documenting central events that occurred in the region in the fields of news, society and community, religion and faith, culture and urbanism, nature and environment, and sports. Israeli and Palestinian photographers participate in the exhibition, as well as foreign photographers based in Israel. Since 2009, the exhibition has been held at MUZA – Eretz Israel Museum in Tel Aviv, attracting tens of thousands of visitors annually.

== History ==
In 2002, Dana Wohlfeiler-Lalkin, the founder and chief curator of Local Testimony, initiated the presentation of the international World Press Photo exhibition in Israel, alongside an exhibition of local press photography. This exhibition was held at the observatory floor of the Azrieli Towers in Tel Aviv. It presented, for the first time, documentation of international events—such as the September 11 attacks and photographs from Afghanistan following the US invasion—alongside local documentation from the Second Intifada.

In 2003, Wohlfeiler-Lalkin established Local Testimony as an annual competition and curated exhibition, similar to World Press Photo. Throughout the years, except for the COVID-19 pandemic periods and the October 7 War, the two exhibitions have been displayed side by side. World Press Photo presents photographs documenting events in the international arena, while Local Testimony presents photographs documenting events in Israel and the Palestinian Authority.

In 2004, the exhibition moved to Dizengoff Center, where it was displayed in various spaces until 2008. In 2009, the exhibition was invited to be displayed at MUZA – Eretz Israel Museum, where it has been held ever since. The exhibition takes place annually during December and January, presenting events from the preceding year (September 1st to August 31st).

In 2023, alongside the annual exhibition, a special exhibition titled "Twenty Years of Testimony" was displayed: a video installation that combined selected photographs from the exhibition's inception with interviews with photographers. That same year, the video work "War Diary" was integrated into the annual exhibition, presenting documentation from the first days of the October 7 War.

== Media Evolution during the Local Testimony Era ==
Since the establishment of Local Testimony, significant developments have occurred in the fields of photography and media. The transition from analog film photography to digital photography, the emergence of cameras with video editing capabilities, the rise of social networks, and the widespread use of smartphones have transformed the media landscape. These developments have influenced the methods of documentary photographers in an era of mass distribution and attempts to shape public opinion through fake news.

The development of AI-generated images further underscores the importance of documentary photography, which utilizes advancing photographic capabilities to create a visual language that expresses human reality.

== Competition and Exhibition ==
The Local Testimony exhibition is a collaboration between photographers submitting their work, a jury, a curator, and the permanent editorial board. Until 2005, printed works were submitted; however, an online judging system was established in 2006. The digital revolution and new camera capabilities led to an increase in submissions from hundreds to thousands of images. Additionally, a category for short video works was introduced in 2007.

The competition is open to photographers holding a press card and photographers whose work has been published in recognized media outlets. Artist photographers who have exhibited in museums and galleries are also eligible to participate.

The jury is independent and composed of professionals from the fields of photography, media, art, and academia. The jury reviews submissions anonymously, selecting the "Photo of the Year," "Series of the Year," and the winners in the various categories. Video works are selected by the Local Testimony editorial board, while the curator completes the exhibition's overall narrative by selecting additional works from the finalists. The jury and curator rotate every two years to broaden the perspectives involved in the exhibition's creation.

=== Prizes and Grants ===
- The Roee Idan Photo of the Year Award: Granted by the Union of Journalists in Israel.
- The Series of the Year Award: Granted by Local Testimony.
- Video Work Grant: Provided by Shomrim – The Center for Media and Democracy.

== Editorial Board ==
The competition and exhibition are managed by the Local Testimony editorial board and a production team. The board was founded in 2007 to guide the jury and rotating curators. Board members participate in selecting judges and curators, initiate collaborations, and oversee production and content development. The board members are:

- Vardi Kahana
- Ami Steinitz
- Anat Kleiman
- Sandy Teperson

== Activities in Israel and Abroad ==
Between 2008 and 2013, Local Testimony, in collaboration with the Peres Center for Peace, conducted four workshops for Palestinian and Israeli documentary photographers titled "Frames of Reality." The program included workshops with international photographers such as Abbas and Gilles Peress.

In 2013, Local Testimony and MUZA initiated "A Picture of Nature" (Tmunat Teva), a biennial competition displayed alongside the Wildlife Photographer of the Year exhibition.

In 2020, in collaboration with the Ministry of Education, the "Young Testimony" (Edut Tze'ira) exhibition was launched, presenting works by high school photography graduates.

== Curators ==
- 2003–2005: Moshe Shai
- 2006: Yossi Nachmias
- 2007: Ami Steinitz and Yossi Nachmias
- 2008: Ami Steinitz
- 2009: Dana Gilerman
- 2010–2011: Galia Gur Zeev
- 2012–2013: Moran Shoub
- 2014–2015: Vardi Kahana
- 2016: Micha Kirshner
- 2017: Vardi Kahana
- 2018: Ami Steinitz
- 2019–2020: Eldad Rafaeli
- 2021: Ami Steinitz
- 2022: Lea Abir
- 2023–2024: Anat Saragosti
- 2025: Ilia Yefimovich
