= Emmanuel Halperin =

Actor, journalist, television presenter

Emanuel halperin עמנואל הלפרין
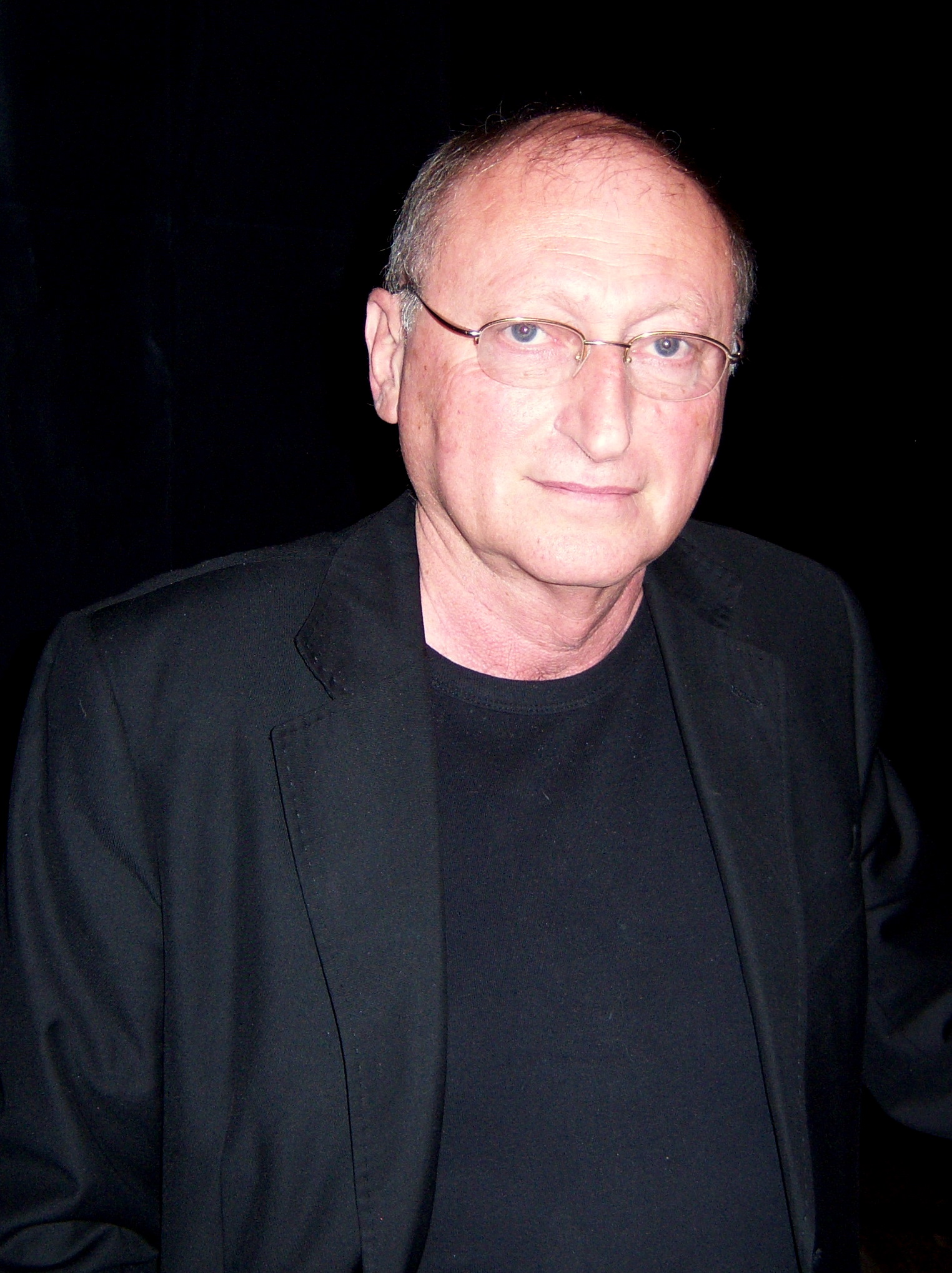
- Born: 15 October 1942 (age 83); Uzbekistan
- Occupation: Journalism

Emmanuel Halperin (Hebrew: עמנואל הלפרין; born 15 October 1942) is an Israeli journalist, television presenter, and editor. Likewise, a Lecturer, and a Theatre and Television Actor. Halperin is best known in Israel for his role as one of the main presenters of the nightly News program MeHayom LeMahar.

== Biography ==
Halperin was born in Uzbekistan to a Jewish immigrants parents from Poland. He grew up in France, and made Aliyah to Israel when he was 19. In the IDF, he served as a Military Censor. Halperin earned two academic degrees in Law, Literature, and Theatre. As a university student he played in French-language theatre performances in Jerusalem.

From 1964, after completing his military service, he began working as a reporter and news presenter in Israel Broadcasting Authority (IBA) Television, and its Kol Yisrael radio. He remained there for over 40 years, consecutively, and became known as one of IBA's veterans. Initially, he began as an IBA's radio reporter in France, and then became a news editor in IBA's French department. Throughout his years in IBA's radio, he served in many positions, among them, foreign news editor, editorial board coordinator, and head of the news division. In addition to his roles in IBA's radio "Kol Yisrael", he later became the foreign news editor in IBA's public Television Channel 1, as well as one of their political reporters. Halperin is mainly known in Israel for his later role as one of the main presenters of the nightly Television News program MeHayom LeMahar, earning him the reputation of a news and culture analyst legend, and making him a culture icon, as well as his presentation of the Saturday night foreign news and culture magazine show of "Ro'im Olam" (Seeing the World).

In late 2003, Halperin retired form IBA, but returned after just few months, for the purpose of hosting a weekly interview show. In addition, from 2006, he began hosting an interview show called "Cafe' Hafuch" (cafe au lait), on the Knesset Channel, conducting interviews from a coffee shop. In 2007, he hosted a quiz show on History, called "Hatzofen" (The Code), on IBA's public channel 1.

In recent years, concurrently to his roles on television, he returned to his acting career. In 2003, he played the role of Socrates in a play called, "Crito", running on "Hachan" theatre. In 2008, he had a role in the Israeli daily soap opera, "Hasufim" (exposed), on Hot TV provider, playing a former Mossad agent, Transportation Minister of Israel, and the father of the show's star Yael Bar Zohar.

Halperin is a Francophile and frequently lectures on France's culture and current affairs in academic forums and television. In 2006, he ran a musical chansons show called "Daber elay Be'Ahava" (Talk to me with Love), with the Israeli chanson singer Brigitte Haviv. In 2008, he and Alex Ansky organized a theatrical-musical show called "Ha'arye Ha'meohav" (The Lion is in love) based on Jean de La Fontaine's proverbs. In the aforementioned show, he played the role of King Louis XIV.

On his nightly news show MeHayom LeMahar, he hosted a regular segment on France's culture and current affairs, via satellite, interviewing IBA's reporter in France, Yaov Talker, on the daily political and culture events there, coining the phrase: "כאן יואב טוקר, מפריז " ("This is Yoav Talker, Paris"), with a French accent in Hebrew.

Halperin lectures on media, news and current affairs, the Americanization of the Israeli culture, French literature, and Cinema of France.

In 2004, he received the Sokolov Award for Journalists, for his television role and life work.

In 2020 he appeared in the TV mini-series Stockholm which aired on Kan 11.

Halperin is the nephew of former Prime Minister of Israel, Menachem Begin.

Halperin is a widower. His wife was a musical editor in IBA's Kol Ha Musica radio channel. He resides in Jerusalem, in Beit HaKerem neighborhood.

== See also ==
- MeHayom LeMahar
