= Ya'akov Ahimeir =

Israeli journalist

Ya'akov Ahimeir יעקב אחימאיר
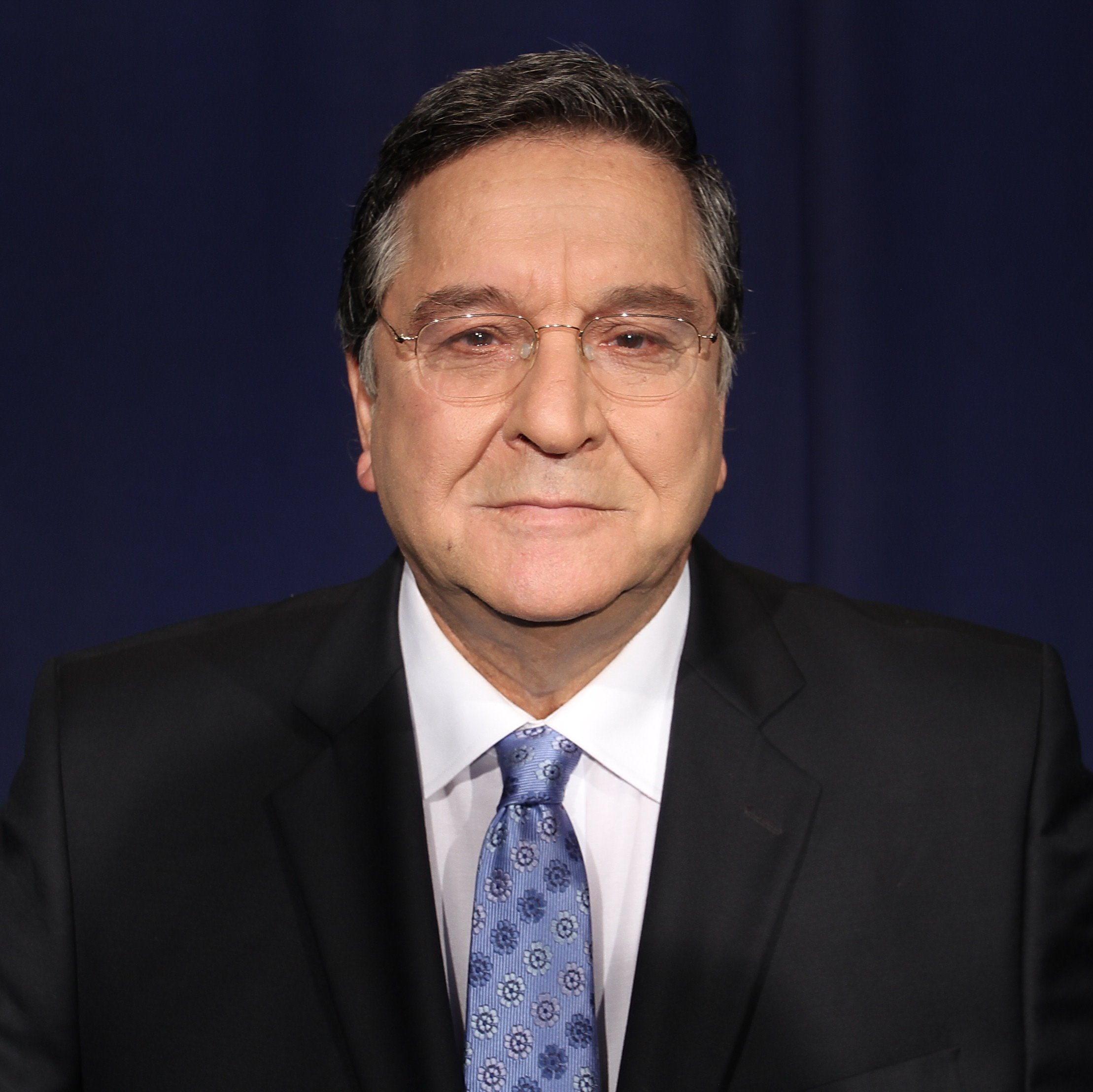
- Born: 21 July 1938 (age 88)
- Occupation: Journalism
- Father: Abba Ahimeir
- Relatives: Yosef Ahimeir (brother)

Ya'akov Ahimeir (Hebrew: יעקב אחימאיר; born July 21, 1938), is a senior Israeli journalist, and a television and radio personality.

== Early life ==
Ya'akov Ahimeir was born in Ramat Gan in 1938, the son of the Revisionist Zionist leader Abba Ahimeir. He was named after Ya'akov Raz, a fighter in one of the Israel's pre-state Jewish undergrounds, who died after he had intentionally infected his own wounds in order not to be caught by the British secret police, and also Shlomo [Ya'akov] Ben-Yosef, known as the first of the Olei Hagardom. He grew up in Jerusalem and graduated from "Dvir" gymnasium. He earned a degree in history and political science from Hebrew University of Jerusalem.

His brother, Yosef, is also a journalist, and a former politician.

== Journalism career ==
He began his journalism career working for Herut LaNoar. During the 1960s, he spent time in London and served as broadcaster in the BBC's daily Hebrew broadcastings, that were transmitted to Israel via shortwave.

Since the 1970s, Ahimeir has been a presenter on Kol Yisrael and Channel 1. He served as a political reporter and as a correspondent from Washington D.C. During his dozens of years of journalistic work, he covered many of Israel's important political events. Among them, he was on the ramp of the plane with which Anwar El Sadat, then president of Egypt, arrived in Israel on 19 November 1979. He was also among the prominent reporters who covered the disengagement plan in August 2005.

Ahimeir was then current affairs editor and presenter in Israel's public Channel 1, and the editor and presenter of the Saturday night foreign news and culture magazine show "Ro'im Olam" (Seeing the World), which was broadcast on Channel 1 from 1988 to 2017 and on Kan 11 from 2017 to 2020. He also appeared on HaBoker HaZeh ("This morning") on Kol Yisrael public radio. In addition, he is among the presenters of the prominent political radio talk show "Yesh im mi Ledaber" ("There is someone to talk to") on Israel Army Radio, during which, a call-in conversations with the show's listeners are being conducted on current affairs issues. Ahimeir also has published many articles and opinion columns in the Maariv and Israel HaYom daily newspapers.

== Awards and recognition ==
Ahimeir is a 2005 Sokolov Award winner on journalistic life work and his thorough and responsible work on covering the comprehensive issues in the Israeli society and the world. In addition, Ahimeir is also the "media critic award" winner from "Zkhut HaTzibur Lada'at" ("The public's right to know") association.

In 2012, he was awarded the Israel Prize in the field of communications.
