= Yosef Ahimeir =

Israeli journalist and former politician

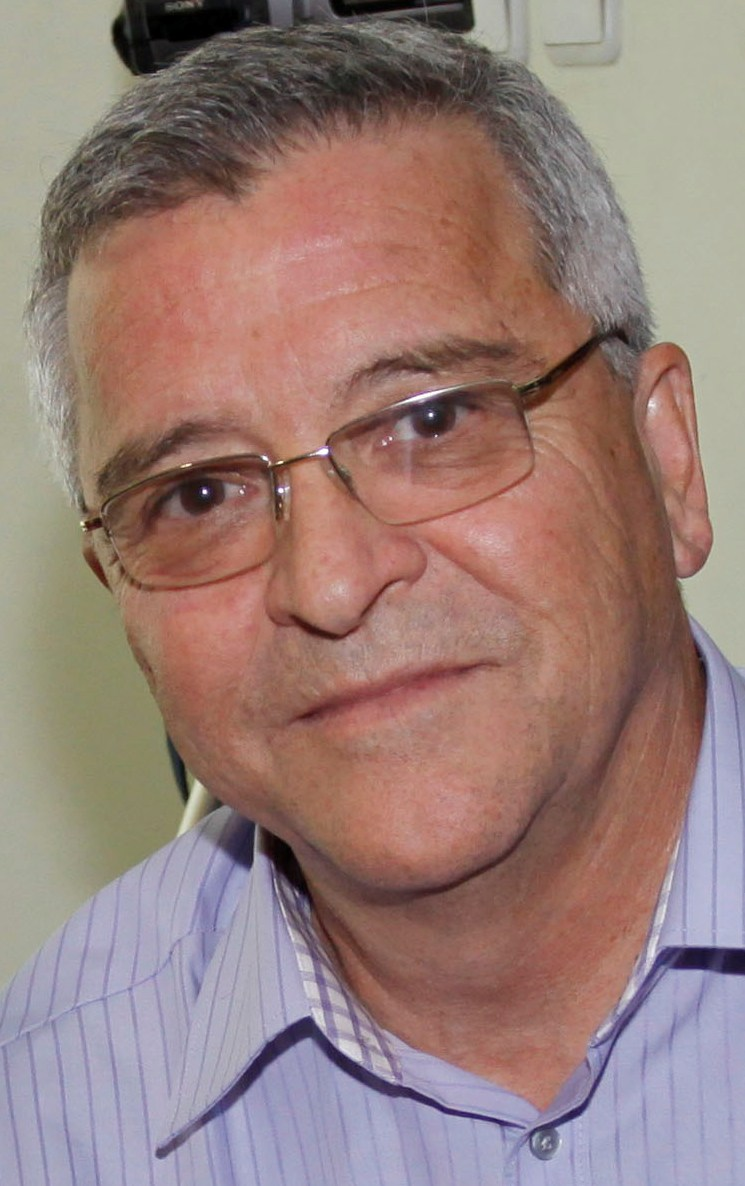
- Ahimeir in 2010

Faction represented in the Knesset
- 1995–1996: Likud

Personal details
- Born: 19 May 1943 (age 82) Jerusalem, Mandatory Palestine

Yosef "Yossi" Ahimeir (Hebrew: יוסף "יוסי" אחימאיר; born 19 May 1943) is an Israeli journalist and former politician, chief editor of the Hebrew ideological quarterly HaUmma. Since April 2005 he is also the director-general of the Jabotinsky Institute in Israel. Today, Ahimeir is member of the directorate of Yad Vashem and of International Board of Governors of the Ariel University Center of Samaria.

== Biography ==
Ahimeir was born in Jerusalem during the Mandate era, the son of the journalist and historian Abba Ahimeir. He gained a BA from Tel Aviv University and began working as a journalist at HaYom, the Gahal-affiliated newspaper, in 1966. In 1969 he moved to Maariv, where he worked until 1984.

In 1984 he became assistant to Prime Minister Yitzhak Shamir. In 1988 he was appointed Director of the Prime Minister's Office, a post he held until Shamir lost the 1992 elections.

Ahimeir was on the Likud list for the elections, and although he failed to win a seat, he entered the Knesset on 7 August 1995 as a replacement for the deceased Haim Kaufman. However, he lost his seat in the 1996 elections.

His brother, Ya'akov Ahimeir, is also a journalist.
