= Lubotzky =

Lubotzky (Hebrew: לובוצקי) is a Jewish surname. Notable people with the surname include:

- Binyamin Eliav (Lubotzky), Israeli politician, diplomat, author and editor
- Iser Lubotzky (Lubocki), member of the Vilna-ghetto's underground, partisan, Irgun officer, and Israeli advocate
- Alex lubotzky, Israeli mathematician, Israel Prize recipient (2018) and politician (member of the 14th Knesset)
- Asael Lubotzky, Israeli physician, writer and biologist

== See also ==
- Lubocki
