= Israeli Army Radio =

Israeli radio station operated by the IDF

Galei Tzahal גלי צה"ל
- Israel
- Frequencies: 96.6 MHz, 102.3 MHz, 104 MHz, 1287 kHz, 945 kHz

Programming
- Language: Hebrew

Ownership
- Operator: Israel Defense Forces
- Sister stations: Galgalatz

History
- First air date: 24 September 1950; 76 years ago

Links
- Website: https://glz.co.il/%D7%92%D7%9C%D7%A6

Israeli Army Radio (Hebrew: גלי צה"ל, lit. 'IDF waves' ) or Galei Tzahal, known in Israel by its acronym Galatz (גל"צ), is a nationwide state funded Israeli radio network operated by the Israel Defense Forces. The station broadcasts news, music, traffic reports and educational programs to the general public as well as entertainment and military news magazines for soldiers. The network has one main station and an offshoot, Galgalatz (גלגל"צ), that broadcasts (mainly English-language and Hebrew) music and traffic reports 24 hours a day in Hebrew. The staff includes both soldiers and civilians. Until December 2013, it broadcast via shortwave to Europe. There is still a livestream feed on the internet. Following the outbreak of the Gaza war in 2023, it started using the former frequencies of 1287 kHz and 945 kHz to reach bomb shelters and other areas in Israel.

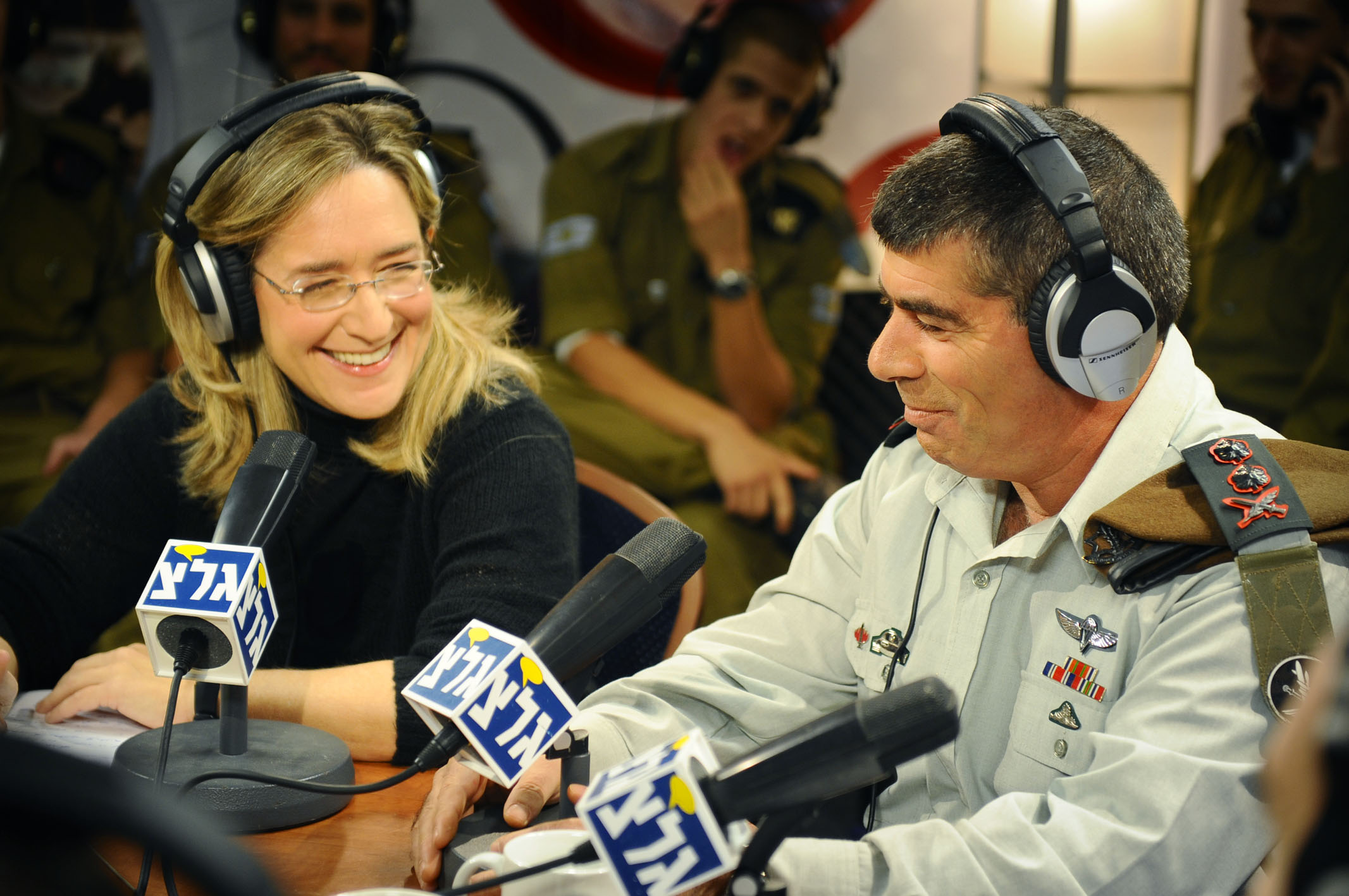
Ilana Dayan and Gabi Ashkenazi (Chief of General Staff) at an annual fundraising programme

== History ==
Galatz started its transmissions on 24 September 1950, as a continuance of the Hagana transmission to the Jewish public during the 1948 Arab–Israeli War. Transmissions began with a trumpet blast at 6:30 p.m. followed by HaTikva, the Israeli national anthem. An improvised studio had been set up inside a former school building in Ramat Gan, with army blankets hung on the walls to muffle background noise.

In 1956, its status was defined by the Israeli Broadcasting Authority law (paragraph 48). The Israel Defense Forces was authorized to choose its programming for soldiers, but programs for civilians had to receive approval from the IBA. During the station's formative period in the 1960s and 1970s, it was headed by Yitzhak Livni. In 1973, during the Yom Kippur War, Galatz was the first Israeli radio station to broadcast around the clock. In 1982, during the Lebanon War, the station collaborated with Israeli Educational Television (IETV). This wartime cooperation led to a daily news and interview show called Erev Hadash (Hebrew: ערב חדש, lit. New Evening).

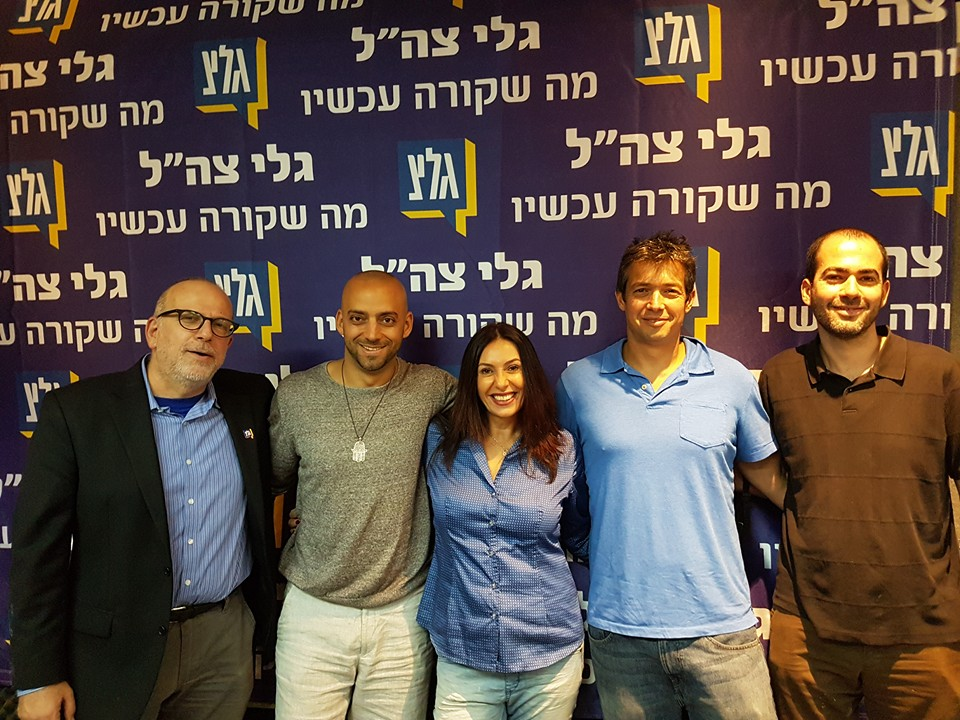
Galei Tzahal Station, 2016 Yaron Deckel, Idan Raichel, Miri Regev, Yoaz Hendel, Dr. Asael Lubotzky

Galatz was the first radio station in Israel to abandon the formal, somewhat stilted Hebrew that was normally used in the media. Its entertainment programs to soldiers were the first to use colloquial Hebrew on air. Its news bulletins use a more relaxed linguistic style than IBA's Kol Yisrael (קול ישראל, Voice of Israel) hourly bulletins. This presentation style proved particularly popular among two age groups: youngsters and senior citizens. In April 1983, the radio station broadcast an interview with historian Yehuda Bauer discussing similarities between the Holocaust and the Armenian genocide. Despite protests by the Israeli Ministry of Foreign Affairs, Ron Ben-Yishai refused to cancel the program, leading to a diplomatic incident in Israel–Turkey relations due to Turkey's Armenian genocide denial.

For many years Galei Zahal broadcasts were mainly geared toward soldiers, including music programs conveying soldiers’ greetings and various broadcasts related to the IDF. The station was unique in that it incorporated soldiers serving in the regular army into journalistic positions, including reporters, editors, producers, news broadcasters, music broadcasters, musical editors, announcers, etc. Following the Yom Kippur War in 1973, the station began broadcasting 24 hours a day, expanding its broadcasts to include news broadcasts and current affairs programming. For years, it was the only Israeli station that continued to broadcast throughout the night. In November 1993 Galei Zahal began operating Galgalatz, which broadcasts music interspersed with traffic reports and has high listener rates.

== Proposed closure and Supreme Court ruling (2025–2026) ==
In December 2025, Minister of Defence Israel Katz decided to close the station by 1 March 2026, as the mere existence of a military-run station for civilian audiences was seen by him as "an anomaly with no parallel in any democratic country in the world" and argued that the station evolved into a platform for views that "attack the IDF and IDF soldiers themselves". Since the outbreak of the Gaza war, the station has faced criticism from some IDF soldiers who argued that its programming did not adequately represent their interests. Likud-backed prime minister Benjamin Netanyahu said that an army station for civilians like Galatz would only exist in North Korea and other like-minded countries, and that a country like Israel wouldn't be part of such a list. Critics, including opposition leader Yair Lapid as well as journalism and human rights organizations, claimed that the closure would stifle free speech and critical reporting. Attorney General Gali Baharav-Miara published an official Memorandum that the shutdown did not have sufficient justification and would be a violation of the law. In August 2026, the Supreme Court overturned the government's decision to shut down Galatz.

== Cultural role ==
According to Oren Soffer, head of communication studies in Open University of Israel, Galei Zahal has become a symbol of pluralism and journalistic freedom.

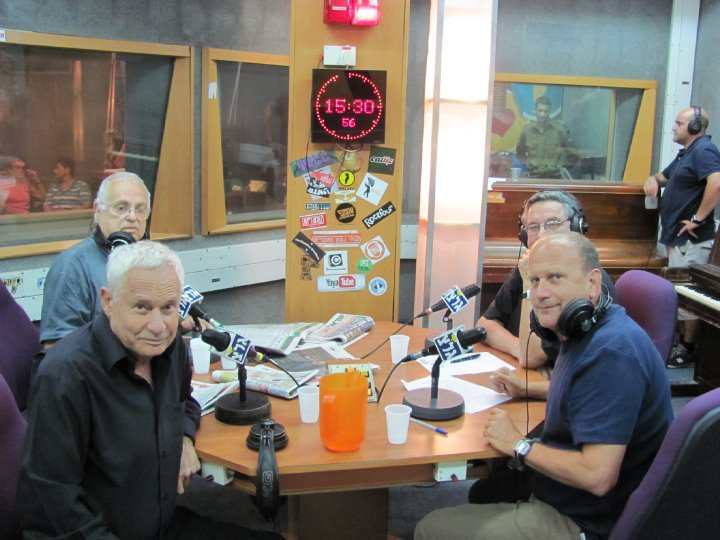
Staff of "Yesh im mi ledaber" (you've got someone to talk to) radio program

According to Michael Handelzalts, a Haaretz columnist and theater critic, Galei Zahal had a "far-reaching positive influence on Israeli culture", and "address[ed] issues of culture in the widest sense." Beginning in the 1960s, new poems were read out on air once a week. In the 1970s, the station broadcast radio plays, inaugurated "University on the Air", and held the first live telephone conversations with listeners ever broadcast on a radio station in Israel. Ram Evron hosted live nightly talk shows.

Galei Tzahal was the first radio station to incorporate a podcast into their scheduling when they gave Israel Story a permanent slot, upon its first edition in 2013.

== Notable broadcasters ==
- Razi Barkai
- Yair Cherki
- Ilana Dayan
- Gil Hovav
- Yoav Kutner
- Irit Linur
- Erez Tal
- Yonit Levi
- Amit Segal
- Daphna Liel
- Ya'akov Eilon
- Tamar Ish-Shalom
- Sivan Rahav-Meir
- Keren Neubach
- Geula Even

Several alumni of the station have transitioned into political careers. These include former government ministers Merav Michaeli, Nitzan Horowitz, and Meirav Cohen, as well as former station commander and IDF Spokesperson Nachman Shai.

== Criticism against the station ==
Over the years, the broadcasting station has been criticized on various issues:

=== Criticism over political campaigning during the 2021 Israeli election ===
On 17 March 2021 New Hope party led by Gideon Sa'ar sent an official letter via attorney claiming that political commentator, Yaakov Bardugo, was conducting illegal pre-election campaigning on behalf of the Likud party. Under Israeli law any form of campaigning during the 60 days preceding an election is strictly regulated.

The party called out Bardugo's repeated pro Likud messaging as well as an incident in which he called party members 'deserters and extortionists'. The party who at the time was expected to take around 10 seats in the upcoming election demanded his immediate suspension. On March 18 the Association of Journalists in Israel (numbering 3500 members of the Israeli news media) published an urgent message to the station's commander, Simeon Elkabetz, demanding action be taken to stop the conduct of the host. This came after the latter lashed out against Moria Assaraf, the station's political correspondent, asking her "disgracefully" if she was "Ashkenazi's spokesperson" during a live show.

=== Criticism over political imbalance ===
Criticism over political imbalance exists over the station from both left and right wing sides of the political map.

On 21 June 2011, the My Israel right wing movement launched a campaign against the station claiming that it was operating against IDF soldiers and espousing an extreme left-wing political agenda. On June 26, more than 100 reservist soldiers demonstrated against the station calling for it to be privatized or rebalance its broadcast tone.

In September 2020, the Times of Israel published an investigative article under the title "Bardugo Airwaves" describing the use made by broadcaster Yaakov Bardugo of his daily political program for the purpose of promoting a right-wing political agenda and the spread of fake news. In February 2021, the newspaper published a second investigation titled "One Man's Propaganda Machine" about Bardugo's use of the station as a platform for repeated attacks on the Attorney General Avichai Mandelblit. In March 2021, the newspaper TheMarker published its own investigative article under the title "The Home of (Netanyahu's) Soldiers" (a play on the station's slogan "The home of the soldiers" in Hebrew) which included a testimony by a former soldier at the station describing a scripting channel between prime minister Benjamin Netanyahu's staff and the broadcaster, among others, via his staff head Natan Eshel.

=== Criticism from the military ===
In 2016, Chief of Staff Gadi Eisenkot said that "it is not right for the IDF to maintain a military station that deals with civil disputes, what is more, the number of standards of soldiers and permanent personnel at this station is very large". In the same year, the head of the Personnel Directorate of the IDF, Hagi Topolansky said that he does not know of an army that has a military station outside of North Korea, but later apologized for this statement.

== See also ==
- Culture of Israel
- Israeli journalism
- The Farsi section of Israel Radio
