= Alexander Lubotzky =

Israeli mathematician and former politician (born 1956)

- אלכסנדר לובוצקי
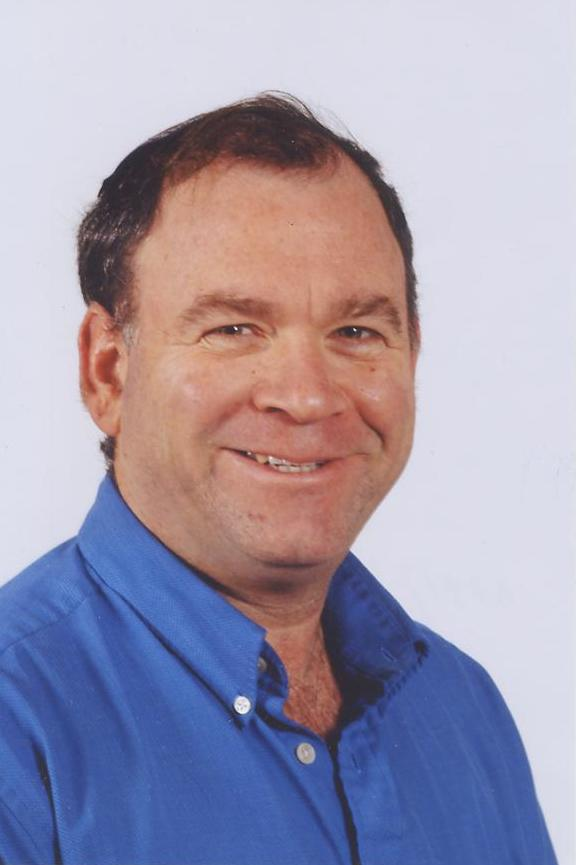
- Lubotzky in 2011

Faction represented in the Knesset
- 1996–1999: The Third Way

Personal details
- Born: 28 June 1956 (age 70) Ramat Gan, Israel
- Spouse: Yardenna Lubotzky (née Roston)
- Children: 6, including Asael Lubotzky
- Parent: Iser Lubotzky (father)
- Scientific career
- Education: Bar-Ilan University (BSc, PhD)
- Known for: Ramanujan graphs, expander graphs, high-dimensional expanders, subgroup growth, locally testable codes
- Awards: Erdős Prize (1991); Ferran Sunyer i Balaguer Prize (1993, 2002); Rothschild Prize (2002); Israel Prize (2018); STOC Best Paper Award (2022); FOCS Best Paper Award (2025)
- Fields: Mathematics (group theory, combinatorics, theoretical computer science)
- Workplaces: Weizmann Institute of Science; Hebrew University of Jerusalem; Yale University (adjunct)
- Thesis: Pro-finite groups and the congruence subgroup problem (1979)
- Doctoral advisor: Hillel Furstenberg
- Doctoral students: Shai Evra

Alexander "Alex" Lubotzky (Hebrew: אלכסנדר לובוצקי; born 28 June 1956) is an Israeli mathematician and former politician. He is a professor of mathematics at the Weizmann Institute of Science and professor emeritus at the Hebrew University of Jerusalem, where he held the Maurice and Clara Weil Chair in Mathematics. He served as a member of the Knesset for The Third Way party from 1996 to 1999. Lubotzky is a leading researcher in group theory and its applications to combinatorics and theoretical computer science, known in particular for the construction of Ramanujan graphs and for the theory of high-dimensional expanders. He received the Israel Prize in mathematics and computer science in 2018.

== Biography ==
=== Early life and education ===
Lubotzky was born in Ramat Gan to parents who were Holocaust survivors. (Note: The Weizmann Institute profile gives his birthplace as Tel Aviv and states that he was raised in Ramat Gan.) His father, the lawyer Iser Lubotzky, was a member of the Vilna Ghetto underground and a partisan, an officer in the Irgun, and later the legal adviser of the Herut movement; his mother, Rivka, survived the war as a girl in the forests of Poland and reached Mandatory Palestine via Cyprus.

While still in high school, Lubotzky began studying mathematics at Bar-Ilan University, receiving his BSc summa cum laude in 1975. He continued directly to doctoral studies under Hillel Furstenberg within the Israel Defense Forces academic reserve programme, and completed his PhD in 1979, at the age of 23, with a thesis on profinite groups and the congruence subgroup problem. He served in the Israel Defense Forces from 1977 to 1982 as an officer in a research and development unit, and was discharged with the rank of captain.

=== Academic career ===
On completing his military service in 1982, Lubotzky joined the Einstein Institute of Mathematics of the Hebrew University of Jerusalem as a senior lecturer. He was promoted to associate professor in 1985, at the age of 29, reportedly becoming the youngest professor in Israel at the time, and to full professor in 1989. He later held the Maurice and Clara Weil Chair in Mathematics. He chaired the Einstein Institute of Mathematics from 1994 to 1996.

Lubotzky was editor-in-chief of the Israel Journal of Mathematics from 1990 to 1995 and remains on its editorial board; he has also served on the editorial boards of the Duke Mathematical Journal, the Annals of Mathematics, the Journal of the European Mathematical Society and other journals, and chaired the general editorial board of Magnes Press from 2004 to 2011. In 2005–2006 he led a year-long special programme at the Institute for Advanced Study in Princeton on Lie groups, representations and discrete mathematics. He was president of the Israel Mathematical Union in 2019–2020.

He has held visiting positions at Princeton University, Yale University, Columbia University, Stanford University, the University of Chicago, the Institute for Advanced Study, ETH Zurich, the Fields Institute and the Massachusetts Institute of Technology, and in 2012 was a visiting researcher at Microsoft Research New England. He was an adjunct professor at Yale from 1999.

Two conferences of the Midrasha Mathematicae series of the Israel Institute for Advanced Studies have been held in his honour: the 20th Midrasha in November 2016, marking his 60th birthday, and the 25th Midrasha, "Groups, Expanders and Codes", in June 2026, marking his 70th.

In 2021 Lubotzky joined the Department of Mathematics of the Weizmann Institute of Science as a full professor.

=== Political and public activity ===
Lubotzky was a founding member of The Third Way party in 1996 and was elected on its list to the 14th Knesset. He sat on the Foreign Affairs and Defense Committee, the Constitution, Law and Justice Committee, the Science and Technology Committee and the Committee on the Status of Women, and chaired the subcommittee on the Year 2000 problem.

In the Knesset he was known chiefly for his compromise proposals on religion-and-state issues. Together with Yossi Beilin and others he drafted the 1998 "Beilin–Lubotzky Covenant", a proposed social contract between religious and secular Israelis, and during the "Who is a Jew?" conversion-law crisis he played a mediating role and accompanied the work of the Ne'eman Committee on conversion. He left politics at the end of the 14th Knesset in 1999 and returned to full-time academic work.

Lubotzky has also served on the board of the Beit Morasha study centre (1987–2005), the public board of governors of the National Library of Israel (2005–2012) and the public council of Yad Izhak Ben-Zvi (2011–2015). In 2002 he was appointed arbitrator in the dispute between the Hebrew University and Amnon Shashua over the intellectual property of Mobileye; the parties reached a settlement in 2004 on the basis of his proposal.

== Research ==
Lubotzky's research centres on group theory in a broad sense: finite and infinite groups, topological, algebraic and arithmetic groups, and their connections with representation theory, number theory, geometry and combinatorics. The Israel Prize committee described him as "one of the most important researchers in the world in group theory" whose work "influenced many fields in mathematics and computer science, especially in the area of expander graphs and their applications". Among his main contributions:

- Ramanujan graphs and expanders. With Ralph Phillips and Peter Sarnak, Lubotzky constructed the first infinite families of Ramanujan graphs: regular graphs whose spectral gap is optimal, and hence expander graphs with the best possible spectral expansion. The construction combines representation theory with deep results from number theory, in particular the Ramanujan–Petersson conjecture.
- High-dimensional expanders and Gromov's topological overlap problem. Lubotzky was among the founders of the theory of expanding simplicial complexes ("high-dimensional expanders"). With David Kazhdan and Tali Kaufman he gave a partial solution to Gromov's topological overlap problem by constructing bounded-degree topological expanders from Ramanujan complexes; the problem was subsequently solved in every dimension by his student Shai Evra together with Kaufman.
- Good locally testable codes. With Irit Dinur, Shai Evra, Ron Livne and Shahar Mozes, Lubotzky gave the first explicit construction of locally testable codes with constant rate, constant relative distance and constant locality ("c³-LTCs"), settling a long-standing open problem in coding theory. The construction is based on a new two-dimensional object, the left-right Cayley complex.
- Explicit lossless expanders. With Jun-Ting Hsieh, Sidhanth Mohanty, Assaf Reiner and Rachel Yun Zhang, he gave the first explicit construction of constant-degree two-sided lossless vertex expanders, resolving another long-standing open question; the graphs also yield new families of quantum LDPC codes with linear-time decoding.
- Profinite methods; conjectures of Serre and Malcev. Lubotzky developed the technique of studying a discrete group through its profinite (or pro-p) completion, applying analytic and topological tools to the completion and drawing conclusions about the original group. In this way he proved Jean-Pierre Serre's conjecture that the fundamental groups of finite-volume hyperbolic 3-manifolds do not have the congruence subgroup property, and gave a group-theoretic characterisation of finitely generated linear groups, answering questions posed by Anatoly Maltsev.
- Subgroup growth. In a series of works with Avinoam Mann and Dan Segal, he characterised the finitely generated groups of polynomial subgroup growth, combining tools from finite, algebraic and profinite groups and number theory. The subject is the theme of his monograph Subgroup Growth with Segal.
- Word metrics on lattices. With Shahar Mozes and M. S. Raghunathan he proved that for irreducible lattices in higher-rank semisimple Lie groups, the word metric is Lipschitz-equivalent to the metric induced from the ambient group, confirming a conjecture of Kazhdan.

== Honours and awards ==
=== Academy memberships and honorary degrees ===
- 2003: Listed by the Institute for Scientific Information as one of the world's most highly cited researchers in mathematics.
- 2005: Elected a Foreign Honorary Member of the American Academy of Arts and Sciences.
- 2006: Honorary doctorate from the University of Chicago for his contributions to modern mathematics.
- 2014: Elected to the Israel Academy of Sciences and Humanities.
- 2022: Elected an honorary member of the Hungarian Academy of Sciences.

=== European Research Council grants ===
Lubotzky has received the European Research Council (ERC) Advanced Grant three times, a distinction shared by very few researchers:

- 2008, for the project "Expander graphs in pure and applied mathematics";
- 2015, for "High-dimensional expanders";
- 2020 (2019 call), for "Stability and testability: groups and codes".

=== Honorary and plenary lectures ===
- 1994: Invited speaker in the algebra section of the International Congress of Mathematicians (ICM), Zürich.
- 1997 and 2016: Plenary speaker at the British Mathematical Colloquium.
- 2011: AMS Colloquium Lectures at the Joint Mathematics Meetings in New Orleans, the first Israeli to be so honoured.
- 2011: Mordell Lecture, University of Cambridge.
- 2012: Simons Lectures, MIT; Takagi Lectures of the Mathematical Society of Japan, Tokyo.
- 2018: Plenary lecture, "High dimensional expanders", at the ICM in Rio de Janeiro.

=== Prizes ===
- 1979: Landau Prize of Mifal HaPais.
- 1980–81: Bergman Memorial Prize of the United States – Israel Binational Science Foundation.
- 1991: Erdős Prize of the Israel Mathematical Union.
- 1993: Ferran Sunyer i Balaguer Prize for the monograph Discrete Groups, Expanding Graphs and Invariant Measures.
- 2002: Rothschild Prize in mathematics.
- 2002: Ferran Sunyer i Balaguer Prize (second time) for the monograph Subgroup Growth, with Dan Segal.
- 2007: Rector's Prize of the Hebrew University for excellence in research and teaching.
- 2018: Israel Prize in mathematics and computer science.
- 2022: Best Paper Award at the ACM Symposium on Theory of Computing (STOC 2022), for the construction of good locally testable codes.
- 2023: Frontiers of Science Award of the International Congress of Basic Science (ICBS), Beijing, for the same paper.
- 2024: IEEE Information Theory Society Paper Award, for the same paper.
- 2025: Best Paper Award at the IEEE Symposium on Foundations of Computer Science (FOCS 2025), for the explicit construction of lossless vertex expanders.

== Personal life ==
In 1980 Lubotzky married Yardenna Roston, daughter of the literary scholar Murray Roston; she is a lecturer in art history and English and the author of a Hebrew book on artistic and traditional interpretation of the weekly Torah portion. The couple have six children and many grandchildren. Their eldest son, Asael Lubotzky, author of From the Wilderness and Lebanon and Not My Last Journey, was severely wounded in the Battle of Bint Jbeil during the 2006 Lebanon War while serving as a platoon commander in the Golani Brigade; after a long rehabilitation he became a physician.

The Lubotzky family were among the founding residents of Efrat, where they live.

== Books ==
- Lubotzky, Alexander; Magid, Andy R. (1985). Varieties of representations of finitely generated groups. Memoirs of the American Mathematical Society. Vol. 336. Providence, Rhode Island: American Mathematical Society. ISBN 978-1-4704-0749-0. OCLC 891383979.
- Lubotzky, Alexander (1994). Discrete groups, expanding graphs and invariant measures. Progress in Mathematics. Vol. 125. Basel: Birkhäuser. ISBN 978-3-0346-0332-4. OCLC 663094095. (reissued in Modern Birkhäuser Classics, 2010)
- Bass, Hyman; Lubotzky, Alexander (2001). Tree lattices. Progress in Mathematics. Vol. 176. Boston: Birkhäuser. ISBN 1-4612-2098-X. OCLC 853261224.
- Lubotzky, Alexander; Segal, Dan (2003). Subgroup growth. Progress in Mathematics. Vol. 212. Basel: Birkhäuser. ISBN 978-3-0348-8965-0. OCLC 851797751.
- de Shalit, Ehud; Lubotzky, Alexander; Puder, Doron (2018). מבנים אלגבריים: חבורות, חוגים ושדות [Algebraic structures: groups, rings and fields] (in Hebrew). Jerusalem: Magnes Press.
