= Sivan Rahav-Meir =

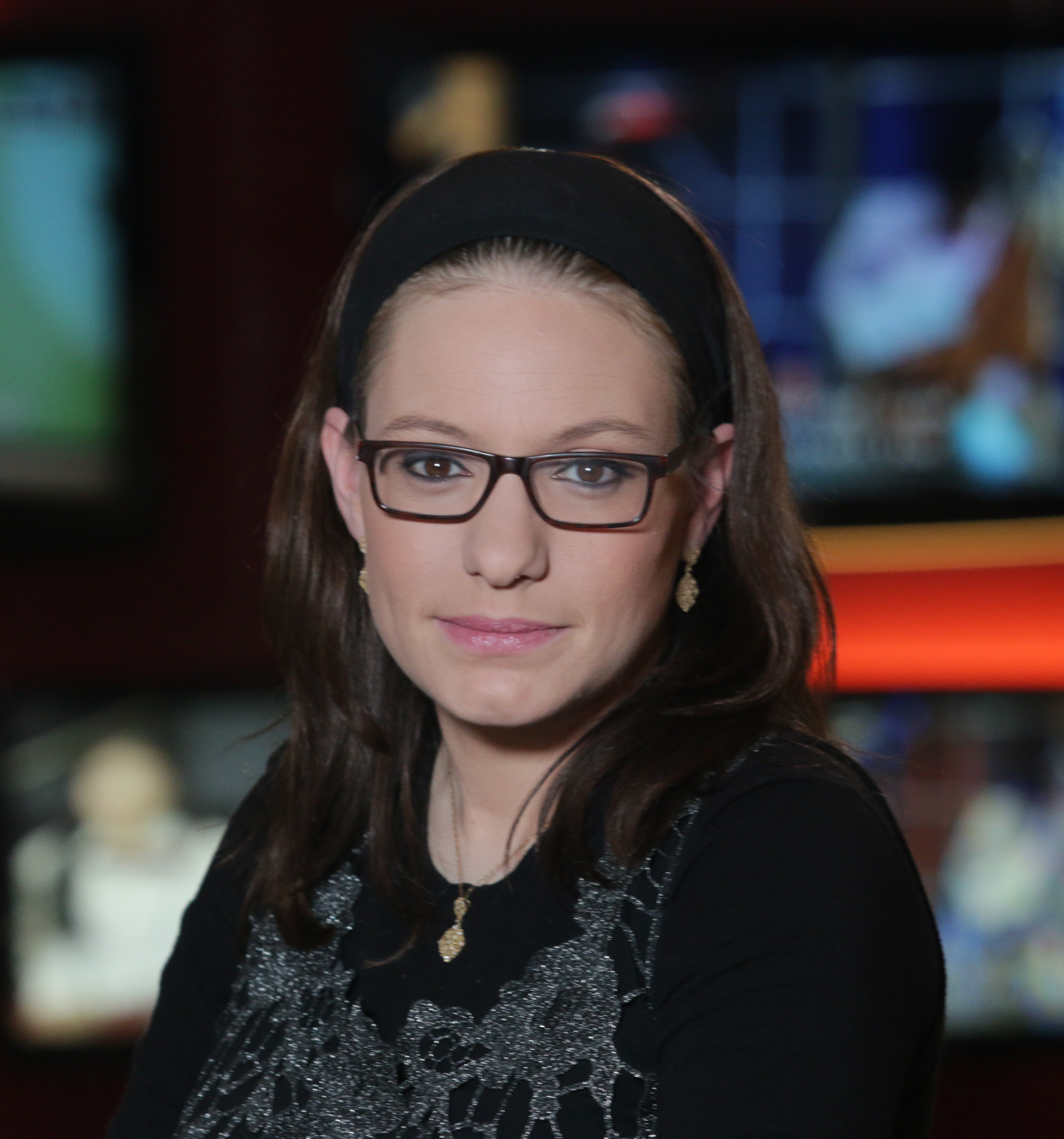
Sivan Rahav-Meir

Sivan Rahav-Meir (Hebrew: סיון רהב מאיר; born 2 July 1981) is an Israeli journalist and television and radio news reporter.

== Biography ==
Rahav-Meir was born in Ramat HaSharon, Israel, to Aryeh and Ronit Rahav. When she was six, the family moved to Herzliya, and she began writing in the children's magazines Chupar and Pashosh. Identified as gifted at age eight, she studied at the School for Gifted Children–Shmuel HaNagid in Herzliya and then in the Ramot program for gifted children at the Rothberg High School. Rahav-Meir served in the Galei Zahal army radio station as the correspondent for welfare and absorption, legal affairs, and religious affairs. Rahav-Meir was brought up in a secular Jewish home but became Orthodox as a teenager.

In 2003, she married Yedidya Meir, a columnist and radio presenter. Rahav-Meir lives in Jerusalem with her husband and five children.

== Journalism and media career ==
Rahav-Meir appeared as a presenter on Israeli Educational Television, hosting various programs such as Banana Boom (co-hosted with Michael HaNegbi) and Zoombit (a program on computer affairs), and served as a youth reporter for the magazines Kulanu and Rosh #1. She interviewed Prime Minister Yitzhak Rabin and Foreign Minister Shimon Peres, and took part in the Dan Shilon Live program and Dudu Topaz's entertainment show.

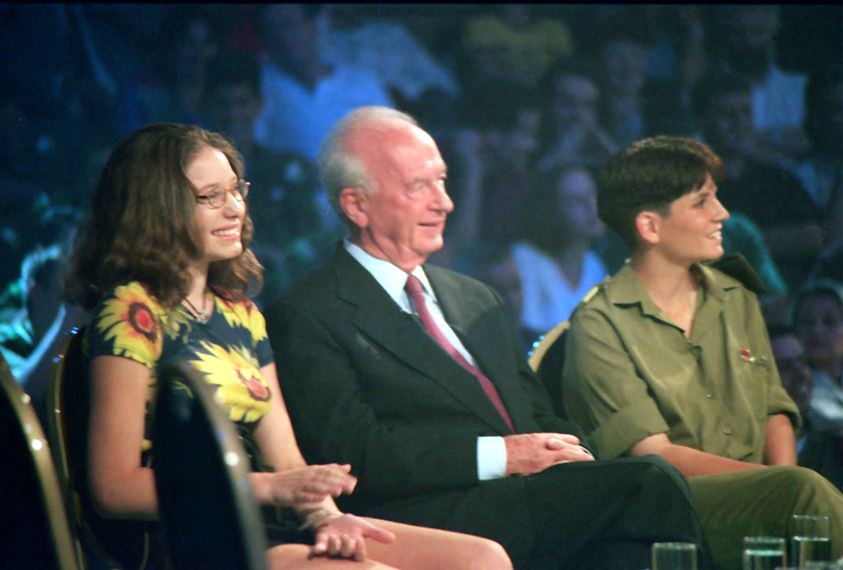
Sivan Rahav (left) aged 14, with Yitzhak Rabin on the Dan Shilon Live program, September 1995

Since 2009, she has presented a weekly radio program on Galei Zahal with her husband on Fridays at noon.

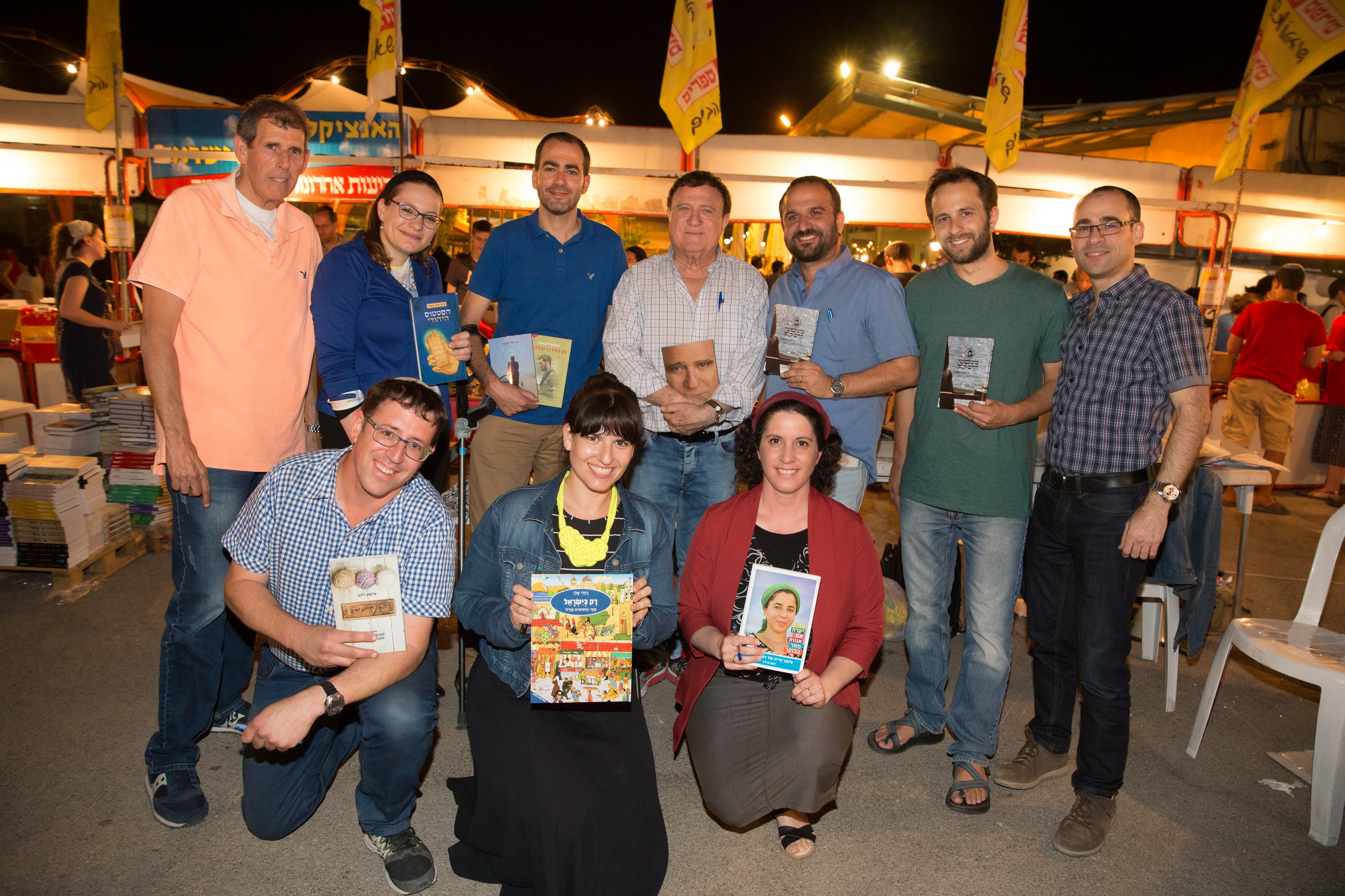
Rahav-Meir with Yedioth Books authors, The Hebrew Book Week fair at the Jerusalem Station compound, 2017 Back line: Dov Eichenwald, Sivan Rahav-Meir, Dr. Asael Lubotzky, Yehoram Gaon

== Awards and recognition ==
In 2017, Rahav-Meir was chosen by Globes magazine as the most popular female media personality in Israel, and by The Liberal as one of the 50 most influential people in Israel. In 2019, Rahav-Meir was appointed as Shlicha to North America for World Mizrachi; she lectured in various Jewish communities during her mission.

== Books and publications ==
1. #Parasha
2. Reaching to Heaven
3. Days are Coming
4. Orthodox Rabbi and Non-Religious Jew Share One Goal
5. Three Things You Can Learn from Rabbi Gershon Edelstein

== See also ==
- Women in Israel
