= Eliav =

Eliav (אֱלִיאָב) is a Hebrew given name/surname found in the Bible. It may refer to:

== People ==
- Aryeh Eliav (1921-2010), Israeli politician and member of the Knesset
- Binyamin Eliav (1909-1974), Israeli politician and diplomat
- Isaac of Norwich, also known as Isaac ben Eliav, a Jewish-English financier
- Guy Eliav, creator of the webcasting company BlogTV
- Yaakov Eliav, Russian-Israeli member of the Jewish Resistance Movement
- Eliav Meir, chief rabbi of the Hevel Modi'in Regional Council
- Eliav Nahlieli, Israeli museologist who designed the Chain of Generations Center, a Jewish history museum, adjacent to the Western Wall Tunnel

== Places ==
- Eliav, Israel, an Israeli village named after Aryeh Eliav
