= Iser Lubotzky =

Polish-Jewish partisan (born 1922)

- איסר לובוצקי
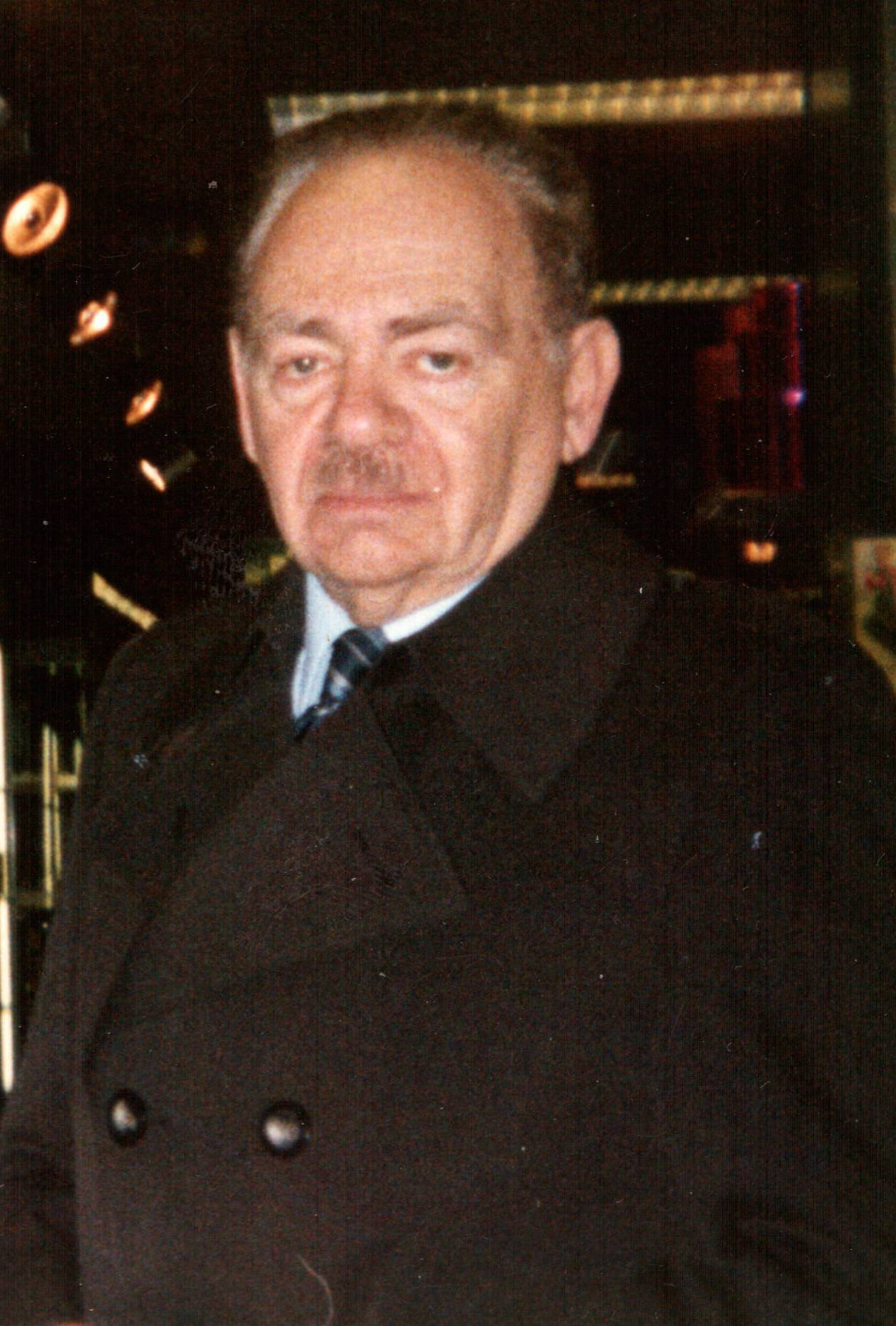
- Born: 13 December 1922; Vilnius, Second Polish Republic (now Lithuania)
- Died: 27 February 2009 (Aged 86); Ramat Gan, Israel
- Burial place: Kiryat Shaul Cemetery
- Children: Alex Lubotzky
- Relatives: Asael Lubotzky (grandson)
- Military career
- Allegiance: partisan, NKVD, Irgun, IDF
- Rank: Captain
- Commands: Irgun Ramat Gan Group
- Conflicts: World War II; Jewish insurgency in Mandatory Palestine; 1947–48 Civil War in Mandatory Palestine
- Awards: Order of the Patriotic War
- Other work: Lawyer; Chairman of Herut's supreme tribunal Likud's first legal adviser

Iser Lubotzky (Lubocki) (Hebrew: איסר לובוצקי; 13 December 1922, in Vilnius – 27 February 2009, in Ramat Gan) was a member of Betar, the Vilna ghetto's underground and a Jewish partisan fighter. He was both a fighting member and a commander of the Irgun, serving as a national recruiting officer and heading the Ramat Gan group. As a lawyer, he served as the head of Herut’s lawcourt and as the Likud's first legal adviser.

== Biography ==
=== Early life ===
He was born in Vilnius, then under Polish rule, to a traditional Jewish family. His father was a successful, Revisionist businessman, and his parents, Alexander and Shoshana, educated him and his older siblings, Nusia and Yitzhak. He studied at the Hebrew Gymnasium in Vilnius which belonged to the Zionist network. From an early age he was active in Betar and advanced to the position of company commander. At the same time he was drafted as an officer cadet in the Polish army.

=== The German invasion of Poland ===
At the outbreak of World War II, in 1939, Germany invaded Poland and Lubotzky was drafted to command an observation post on the front line of the Polish army. He served in that brief campaign until the position was bombed from the air, when most of his unit members were killed, he being one of the few survivors. After Poland's surrender, it was divided between Germany and the Soviet Union in accordance with the Ribbentrop-Molotov Pact, and Vilnius came under Lithuanian rule until it was annexed by the Soviet Union. He returned to Vilnius, completed his high school studies and began studying law.

=== The German invasion of the Soviet Union ===
In June 1941, Nazi Germany invaded the Soviet Union and soon captured Vilnius. A ghetto was established in the city and Jews captured for labor were taken by force to the Ponary massacre. Iser and his brother Yitzhak fled the ghetto just before one of those actions but returned to it later. Lubotzky joined the Fareynikte Partizaner Organizatsye (FPO), the secret underground that was set up in the ghetto and fought against the Germans. At the decision of his underground commanders, he was recruited to the ghetto's secret-police unit to gather intelligence. Josef Glazman, one of the leaders of FPO, informed him of the underground's goals and shared with him various secret plans. After his release, he continued his activities in the underground. On the day of the liquidation of Vilna's ghetto in September 1943, a small-scale revolt broke out and Lubotzky left the ghetto with a group of about 100 partisans under Abba Kovner, escaping through the sewers to join partisans operating in the surrounding forests.

Lubotzky lived in a Soviet partisan battalion in the Rūdninkai forest, taking part in raids on German convoys and on local villages. His sister Nusia, the only survivor of his family, fought with him as a partisan in its patrol unit. In one of the battles, on 3 May 1944, Iser was wounded in the leg, the wound became infected, he developed a high temperature and his comrades not only expected his death but even dug a grave for him. A partisan Jewish nurse, however, treated him with leaf bandages and medicines stolen from a German shipment and saved his life. In time, the son of the nurse who assisted Iser later treated as a doctor Lubotzky's grandson, Asael Lubotzky, when he was wounded during the Second Lebanon War.

Lubotzky participated in the Red Army's occupation of Vilnius. After the Germans withdrew, he was drafted into the Soviet secret police, the NKVD, due to his command of the region's languages and, as a result of an attack against terrorists that he commanded, he rose through the ranks to become an officer. He later received a medal for this action – "Order of the Patriotic War". In 1945 he was able to leave the service and return to Poland, where he was appointed head of Betar's rescue organization. He helped organize a number of illegal-immigrant ships to Israel, and after having heard that, apart from his sister Nusia, his entire family had perished, he boarded a Transilvania ship from Romania and travelled to Israel.

=== His activities in the Irgun ===
In Israel, Lubotzky completed his law studies in Tel Aviv School of Law and Economics, graduated with honors and began working. He had known Menachem Begin from the period when Begin was a refugee in Vilnius and had hid in Lubotzky's parents' home. Shortly after Lubotzky's arrival in Israel, he met him in a hiding place and together with him recruited some 2,000 new Irgun members, while acting as the head of the group in Ramat Gan. In one of the operations, he was arrested by the British police and stood trial. He took advantage of his legal knowledge and claimed that the prosecutor had brought insufficient evidence. Knowing he would soon be arrested in administrative detention by the British police, he escaped from the court, and changed both his identity and his address. Lubotzky participated in the Irgun's attack on the British airport in Lod, and in the Irgun's attack on Jaffa. When the ship Altalena arrived, he joined Begin in an attempt to bridge the gap between the Irgun and representatives of the government who offered to purchase all the weapons on board. When the offer was discussed at the Irgun commanders' meeting, Lubotzky voted in favor, but Begin was opposed, insisting that the Irgun was not in the business of trading in weapons. During the War of Independence, Lubotzky was drafted into the Golani Brigade and fought in the containment battles in northern Israel, during which period he served in a front-line position, managing to hit dozens of the enemy.

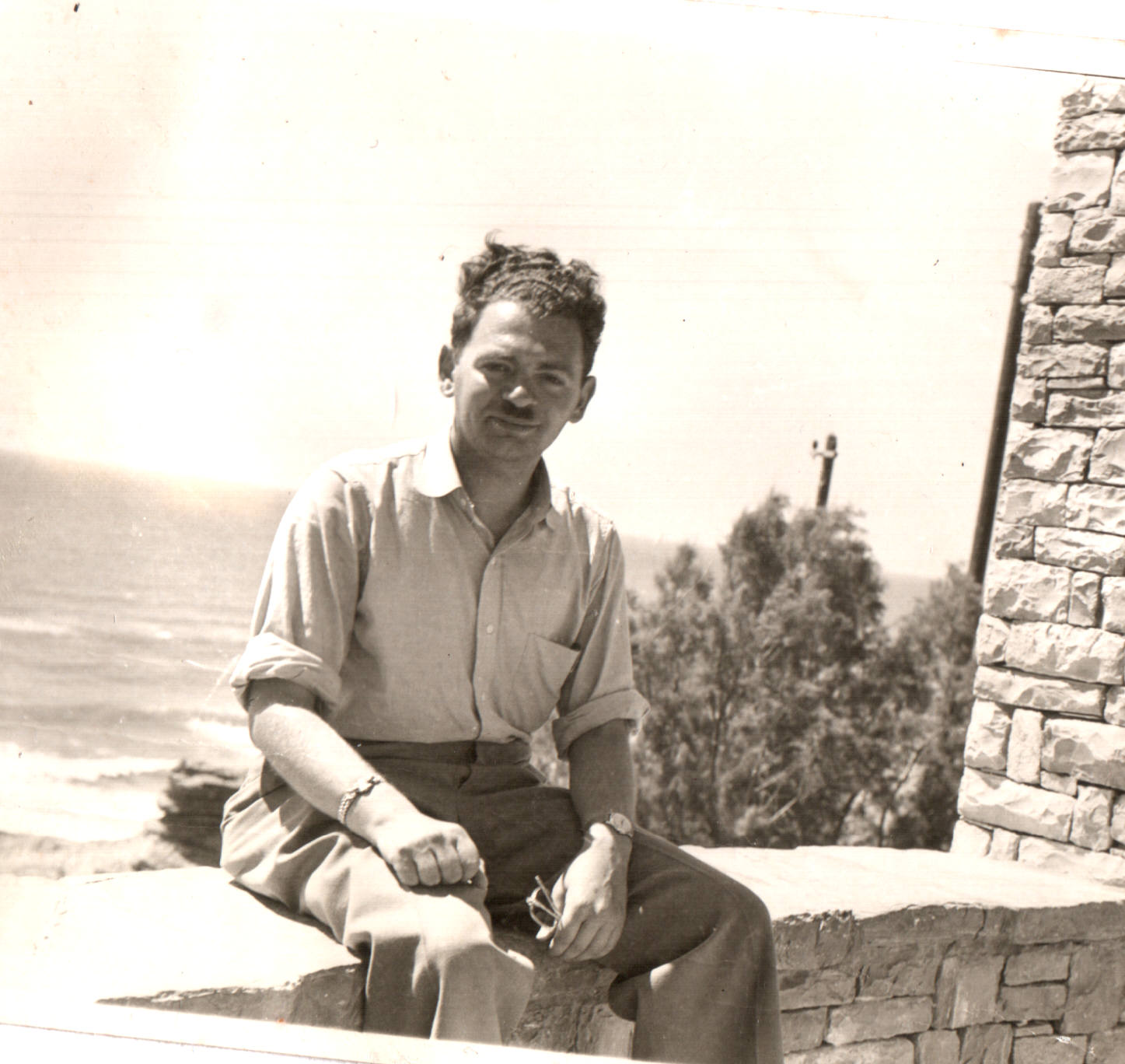
Iser Lubotzky in Israel

=== After the establishment of the Israel state ===
After the end of the War of Independence, he served for another short period in staff positions in the IDF but was forced to be released due to his past as a member of the Irgun. After his release, he returned to his legal profession, working in the office of Aharon Polonsky. Later, he opened an independent office, was active in the Herut movement and served as chairman of the movement's election committee and chairman of its supreme tribunal. In that capacity, he served as a judge when three Herut members wrote a letter attacking Begin. Lubotzky ruled against the defendants, including Shmuel Tamir, and sentenced them to long-term expulsion from the movement's institutions. In the early 1970s, he was appointed attorney general of the Herut movement, and after the establishment of the Likud as its first legal adviser, serving in a voluntary capacity until 1992. He was also a member of the Freemasonry and served as president of the Tel Aviv Masonic body.

== Family life ==
His parents Alexander and Shoshana and his brother Yitzhak were murdered in the Holocaust. His sister, Nusia, survived World War II, married Dr. Grisha Dlugi and lived in New York City. Iser married Rivka (a member of the Blizovsky family), a Holocaust survivor who had immigrated to Israel, and they had four children. Their son, Alex Lubotzky, is a professor of mathematics (Israel Prize in Mathematics, 2018) and has served as a Knesset member. Another son, Dr. Yitzhak Lubotzky, became a judge in the Tel Aviv Labor court. Their daughter Shoshana Weiler and their son Mordechai Lubotzky are doctors.

Iser Lubotzky died on 27 February 2009. The following words were engraved on his tombstone: “Lawyer and scholar, member of Betar and the Vilna-ghetto's underground, partisan, fighter of the Irgun, and of the national movement in Israel.”

== Not My Last Journey ==
Not My Last Journey is a biography of Iser Lubotzky written by his grandson, Dr. Asael Lubotzky, and edited by Dr. Tali Vishna. The book was published in Hebrew in 2017 by Yedioth Books, in collaboration with the Menachem Begin Heritage Center. President Reuven Rivlin wrote in the introduction to the book:

Iser Lubotzky's story is a breathtaking and fascinating biographical novel... it is a story about one individual, which is at the same time a full world. Rare indeed is this character whose story is so rich and so intertwined with the experiences of the Jewish people in general and the national revival in particular, that their personal memory becomes the collective memory.

The book was written on the basis of testimonies by Iser Lubotzky, recorded by his family members, the Menachem Begin Heritage Center and Holocaust centers around the world, combined with historical research. On the occasion of the book's launch, a seminar was held in June 2017 at the Begin Center in Jerusalem with the participation of Herzl Makov, Dov Eichenwald, Maj. Gen. (Res.) Yaakov Amidror and Prof. Moti Zalkin.
