= Shai Evra =

Israeli mathematician

- שי אברה
- Born: Israel
- Education: Hebrew University of Jerusalem
- Known for: Representation theory, High dimensional expanders, Golden Gates for three dimensional unitary groups
- Awards: Levitzki prize (2026), Azrieli Early Career Faculty Fellowship (2021-2022), SASTRA Ramanujan Prize (2020), Clore Scholarship (2016), Perlman Prize (2014), Zafriri Prize (2014),
- Scientific career
- Fields: Mathematics
- Workplaces: Hebrew University of Jerusalem, Princeton University, Institute for Advanced Study
- Doctoral advisor: Alexander Lubotzky

Shai Evra (Hebrew: שי אברה) is a mathematician at the Hebrew University of Jerusalem specialising in representation theory. He was awarded the SASTRA Ramanujan Prize in 2020. He researches symmetric spaces of arithmetic groups.

According to the SASTRA Ramanujan Prize citation, Shai Evra was selected for the prize for his outstanding work on ". . . high dimensional expanders in the area of combinatorial and geometric topology and on Golden Gates for three dimensional unitary groups. He employed deep results from representation theory and number theory, pertaining to the Generalised Ramanujan Conjectures. The prize recognises his fundamental paper in the Journal of Topology and Analysis, in which he extends both the combinatorics and automorphic form theory to generalise the construction of Mikhail Gromov and others on expander graphs. His fundamental work will have major implications even outside mathematics, extending into theoretical computer science, according to the citation."

Shai Evra was born in Israel. He had his education at the Hebrew University of Jerusalem earning the B Sc degree in 2012, M Sc degree in 2013 and Ph D degree in 2019. His research supervisor was Alexander Lubotzky. He has been a postdoctoral researcher at the Institute for Advanced Study (2018–2020) and is an instructor at Princeton University for 2020–2021. He subsequently returned to the Hebrew University of Jerusalem as a senior lecturer in the Einstein Institute of Mathematics.

== Other honours ==
The other recognitions Evra had earned include Clore Scholarship instituted by Clore Israel Foundation (2016), the Perlman Prize, Hebrew University of Jerusalem (2014) and the Zafriri Prize, Hebrew University of Jerusalem (2014).
