= Murray Roston =

Israeli professor of English literature

- מאיר רוסטון
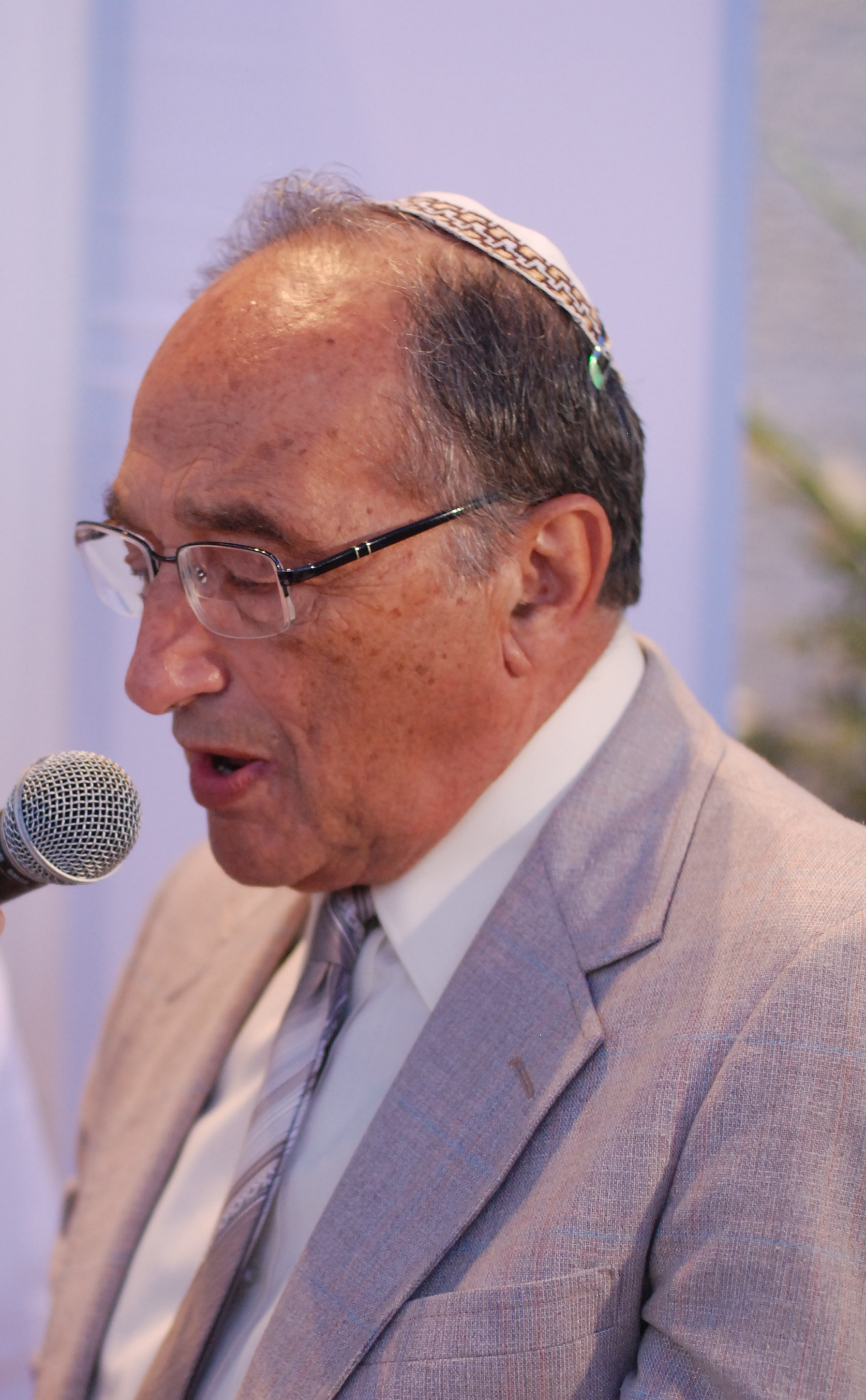
- Born: 10 December 1928 (age 97); London, England
- Education: Queens' College, Cambridge University of London
- Scientific career
- Fields: English literature
- Workplaces: Bar-Ilan University University of California, Los Angeles

Murray (Meir) Roston (Hebrew: מאיר רוסטון; born 1928) is an Anglo - Israeli Emeritus professor of English Literature at Bar-Ilan University.

== Biography ==
Murray (Meir) Roston was born in London in 1928. Roston married Faith Lehrman and, shortly afterwards, they immigrated to Israel, living for many years in Kiryat Ono and then moving to Nordiya, near Netanya. They have three daughters ‒ Yardenna (married to Alex Lubotzky), Nina, and Yonit.

== Academic career ==
Roston won the Open Classics Scholarship to Queens' College, Cambridge, and after obtaining a degree in classics, transferred to English literature for a PhD from the University of London. He taught English, Hebrew and Classics at Carmel College (Oxfordshire), and emigrated to Israel in 1956, to a position at Bar Ilan University where he is now Emeritus Professor of English. Roston taught a number of times as a visiting professor at Stanford University, as well as at the University of Virginia. In 1988–90 he was appointed Dean of Humanities Faculty at Bar-Ilan University. In 1996, he was appointed to the permanent faculty at UCLA as adjunct professor, and subsequently taught there every third year, while retaining his position in Israel. Roston is a member of numerous Editorial and Advisory Boards and he was a member of Academic Council, and Director of Humanities Program, of Open University of Israel.

== Research ==
Roston is an interdisciplinary scholar, author of a series of books examining how a knowledge of contemporary changes in the visual arts can illumine our understanding of parallel developments in literature. His Changing Perspectives in literature and the visual arts was rated 'Outstanding' by Choice, described there as: "A sumptuous book ... of paramount significance to literary studies, to cultural and art history, and to aesthetics". Milton and the Baroque was similarly described by the Times Literary Supplement as: "a study which itself partakes of the power and brilliance of his subject". He has published six books on the interrelationship with the arts, as well as a number of other books on themes ranging from the Renaissance to the 20th-century. His most recent book, The Comic Mode in English Literature, was rated, in Choice's annual review, one of the Outstanding Academic titles of 2012.

== Published works ==
- Prophet and Poet: the Bible and the Growth of Romanticism. 204 pages. UK: Faber & Faber; US: Northwestern University Press, 1965. Arden reprint 1979.
- Biblical drama in England: from the Middle Ages to the Present Day. 335 pages. UK: Faber & Faber; US: Northwestern University Press, 1968.
- The soul of wit: a study of John Donne. 236 pages with 12 plates on Mannerist art. Oxford University Press (Clarendon Press), 1974. Reprinted 1976.
- Milton and the baroque. 192 pages with 12 plates. UK: The Macmillan Press; US: University of Pittsburgh Press, 1980.
- Sixteenth Century English Literature. 235 page with 12 illustrations. UK: The Macmillan Press; US: Schocken Press, 1982. Hardcover & paperback. Reprinted 1984, 1988. Arabic trans. 2005.
- Renaissance Perspectives: in Literature and the Visual Arts. Princeton University Press, 1987. 380 pages with 84 illustrations. (paperback edition and hardcover reprint 1989).
- Changing Perspectives: in Literature and the Visual Arts, 1650–1820. Princeton University Press, 1990. 458 pages with 123 art illustrations. (paperback edition and hardcover reprint 1992).
- Victorian Contexts: Literature and the Visual Arts. 246 pages with art illustrations. US: New York University Press; UK: The Macmillan Press, 1997 (reprinted 1998).
- Modernist Patterns: in Literature and the Visual Arts. 288 pages with art illustrations. US: New York University Press; UK: The Macmillan Press, 2000. Issued as e-book 2010.
- The Search for Selfhood in Modern Literature. 243 pages. Palgrave (The Macmillan Press UK & St. Martin's Press US), 2001.
- Graham Greene's Narrative Strategies: a Study of the Major Novels. 168 pages. Palgrave (The Macmillan Press UK & St. Martin's Press US), 2006.
- Tradition and Subversion in Renaissance Literature: Studies in Shakespeare, Spenser, Jonson, and Donne. 258 pages. In the series: Medieval & Renaissance Literary Studies. Duquesne UP, 2007.
- The Comic Mode in English Literature: from the Middle Ages to Today'. Continuum Press, 2011 (hardcover/paperback/e-book).

== Editor & contributor: (Hebrew) ==
- The Shakespearean World, Am Hasefer, 1965, pp. 283.

== Translator (from Hebrew) ==
- Isaiah Rabinovich, Major Trends in Modern Hebrew Fiction. University of Chicago Press, 1968. 288 pages; and many other books.
- Asael Lubotzky, From the Wilderness and Lebanon. Koren Publishers Jerusalem, 2016. 206 pages.

== Essays in honour of Murray Roston ==
- Ellen Spolsky, ed. Iconotropism: Turning toward Pictures. Lewisburg, Pennsylvania: Bucknell University Press, 2004. 210 pages.
