= Dov Eichenwald =

Israeli publisher (born 1955)

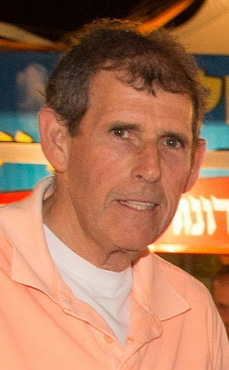
Dov Eichenwald

Dov Eichenwald (Hebrew: דב איכנולד; born November 7, 1955) is CEO and publisher of Yedioth Books and editor-in-chief of the publishing house.

== Biography ==
Dov Eichenwald is the son of Abraham Zvi, a Holocaust survivor who survived Auschwitz, and Sarah (Haltovsky) who was born in Jerusalem. He grew up in Bnei Brak, attended Haroeh high school in Ramat Gan, and served in the IDF as an investigating officer in the Army's military police. Following his release he began to study for a BA at Bar Ilan University but did not finish due to a serious injury he suffered while serving as a reserve commander during the 1982 Lebanon War. In the aftermath of the Tyre headquarters bombings, Eichenwald was trapped under rubble for nine hours and was rescued in serious condition.

Since childhood, Eichenwaldhelped his father operate the family business 'Hemed Books', a small independent publishing house specializing in non-fiction literature, and as an adult he joined the management. In 1994 a partnership was formed between 'Hemed Books' and Yedioth Ahronoth thus founding 'Miscal - Publishing' known today as Yedioth Books. Eichenwald is CEO of the publishing house ever since.

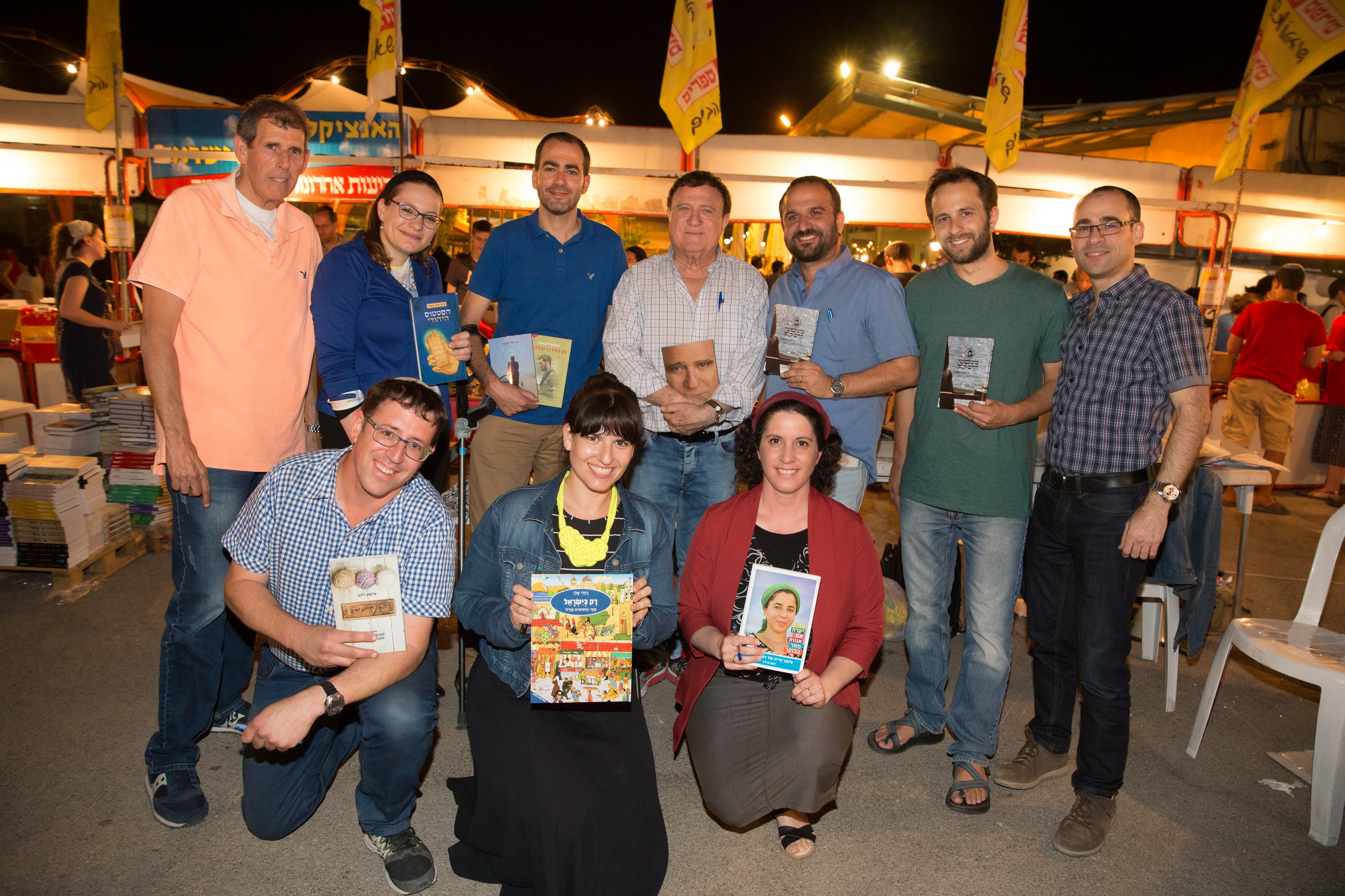
Eichenwald with Yedioth Books authors: Back line: Dov Eichenwald, Sivan Rahav-Meir, Dr. Asael Lubotzky, Yehoram Gaon

Eichenwald is remarried to Tali Eichenwald-Dvir, vice dean of the Arison School of Business at IDC Herzliya, and they live in Givat Shmuel. They have eight children.
