= From the Wilderness and Lebanon =

2006 autobiography by Asael Lubotzky

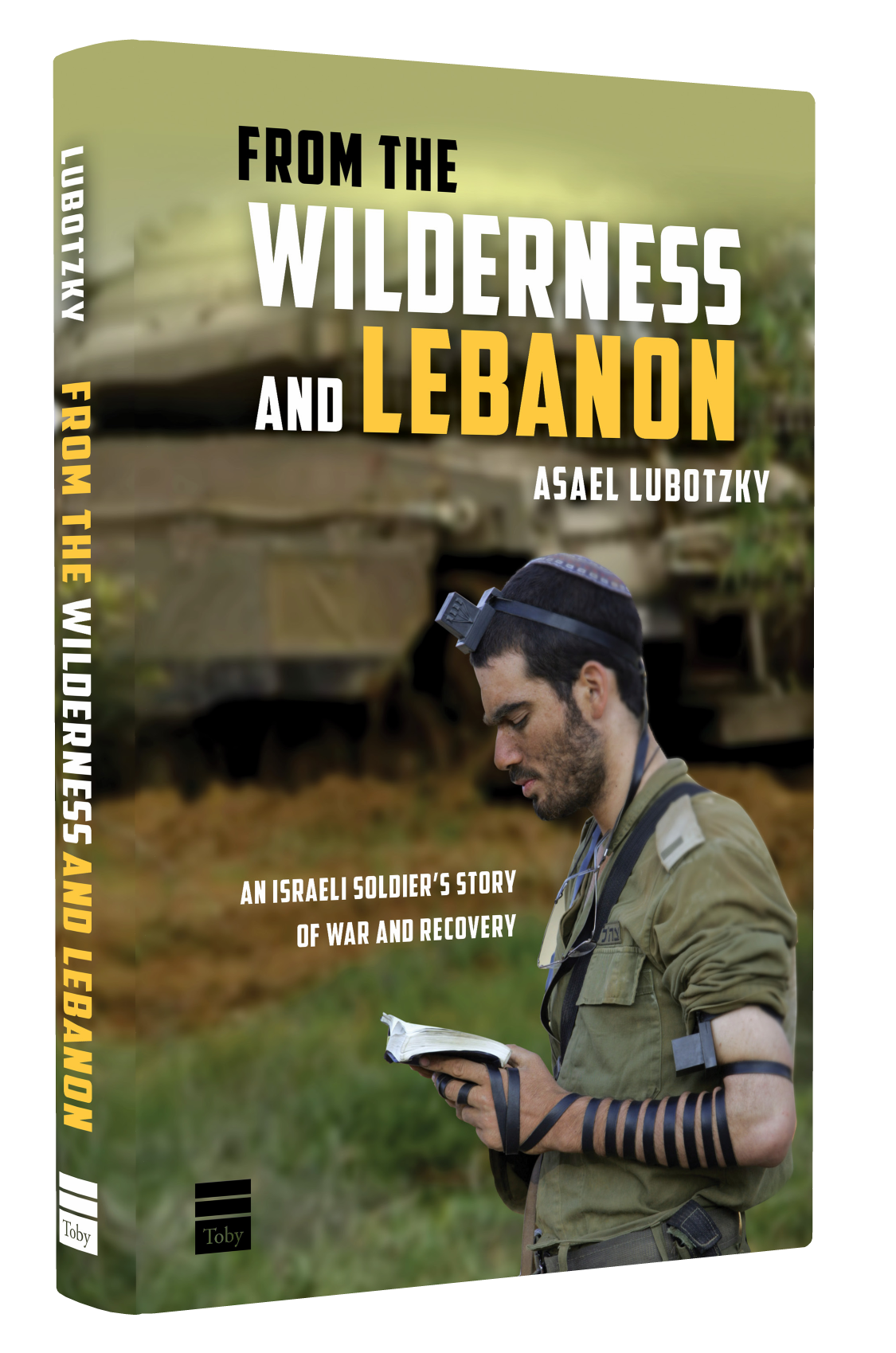
- Front cover
- Author: Asael Lubotzky
- Original title: מן המדבר והלבנון; Min HaMidbar VeHaLevanon
- Translator: Professor Murray Roston
- Language: Hebrew
- Genre: memoir
- Publisher: Yedioth Sfarim (Hebrew); Koren Publishers Jerusalem (English)
- Publication date: 2008
- Publication place: Israel
- English publication date: 2016
- Media type: Print, e-book, audiobook
- Pages: 206
- ISBN: 978-1592644179
- Website: From the Wilderness and Lebanon

From the Wilderness and Lebanon - An Israeli soldier's story of war and recovery (Hebrew: מן המדבר והלבנון) is the English translation of the first book by Israeli author Asael Lubotzky.

The book records his experiences when serving as an officer in the Israeli army during the 2006 Lebanon War and recounts autobiographically his long period of recovery from the wounds he sustained in battle. The book was originally published in Hebrew by Yedioth Books in 2008, and became a bestseller, and in English translation under this title in 2016. The army's former chief of staff, General Moshe Ya'alon, wrote a laudatory foreword.

== Synopsis ==
The book describes the Second Lebanon War from the perspective of a platoon commander in the Golani Brigade. It records the preparations for battle, the fighting itself, and the responsibilities and challenges that faced him as he led his men forward under fire.

The first section records how the kidnapping of Gilad Shalit compelled Israel to respond and fight in Gaza. Battalion 51, part of the Golani Brigade, entered Gaza. From fighting there the soldiers were called to fight in the north, in what came to be called the Second Lebanon War and forms the subject of the second section. Among the many engagements, the most memorable was the Battle of Bint Jbeil in which Roi Klein, the deputy-battalion-commander was killed together with seven officers and men. Among the fallen was Amichai, the author's closest friend, and Asael describes the terrible experience of finding himself holding the dead body of his dearest comrade. It is to the latter's memory that the book is dedicated. After many days' fighting at Bint Jbeil, the author himself was severely wounded when an anti-tank missile hit his vehicle.

In addition to those personal experiences, there emerge certain stories connected with the past, such as the discovery that the nurse who tended his grandfather, Iser Lubotzky, when injured as a partisan fighting against the Nazis was the mother of the doctor who was treating Asael.

== Reception ==
The book became a bestseller and received wide coverage, perhaps because it recorded acts of heroism in a war that was perceived by many as a failure. Former IDF chief of staff and former Israeli Defense Minister, Lt. General Moshe (Bogie) Ya'alon, wrote in the Foreword:

Asael's diary provides a picture of a young native-born Israeli standing up to challenges that few young men in our world are required to face: questions of life and death, of human dignity, challenges both ethical and moral, of command and operational responsibilities in peace and war and, subsequent to his injury, challenges demanding courage in overcoming pain and disabilities. In all these respects, Asael's story proves yet again the victory of spirit over matter.

Many reviews of the book saw it as representing 'the beautiful Israel', the embodiment of modern Zionism, while others felt that it should have criticized more forcefully the political and military leadership of the war.

The English translation of the book was launched on October 20, 2016, in Jerusalem at an evening event entitled "Faith and Doubt in Times of Uncertainty". The speakers were Rabbi Shlomo Riskin, Brigadier-general Avigdor Kahalani, and the author, Asael Lubotzky.
