= Michael Handelzalts =

Israeli theater critic (born 1950)

Michael Handelzalts מיכאל הנדלזלץ
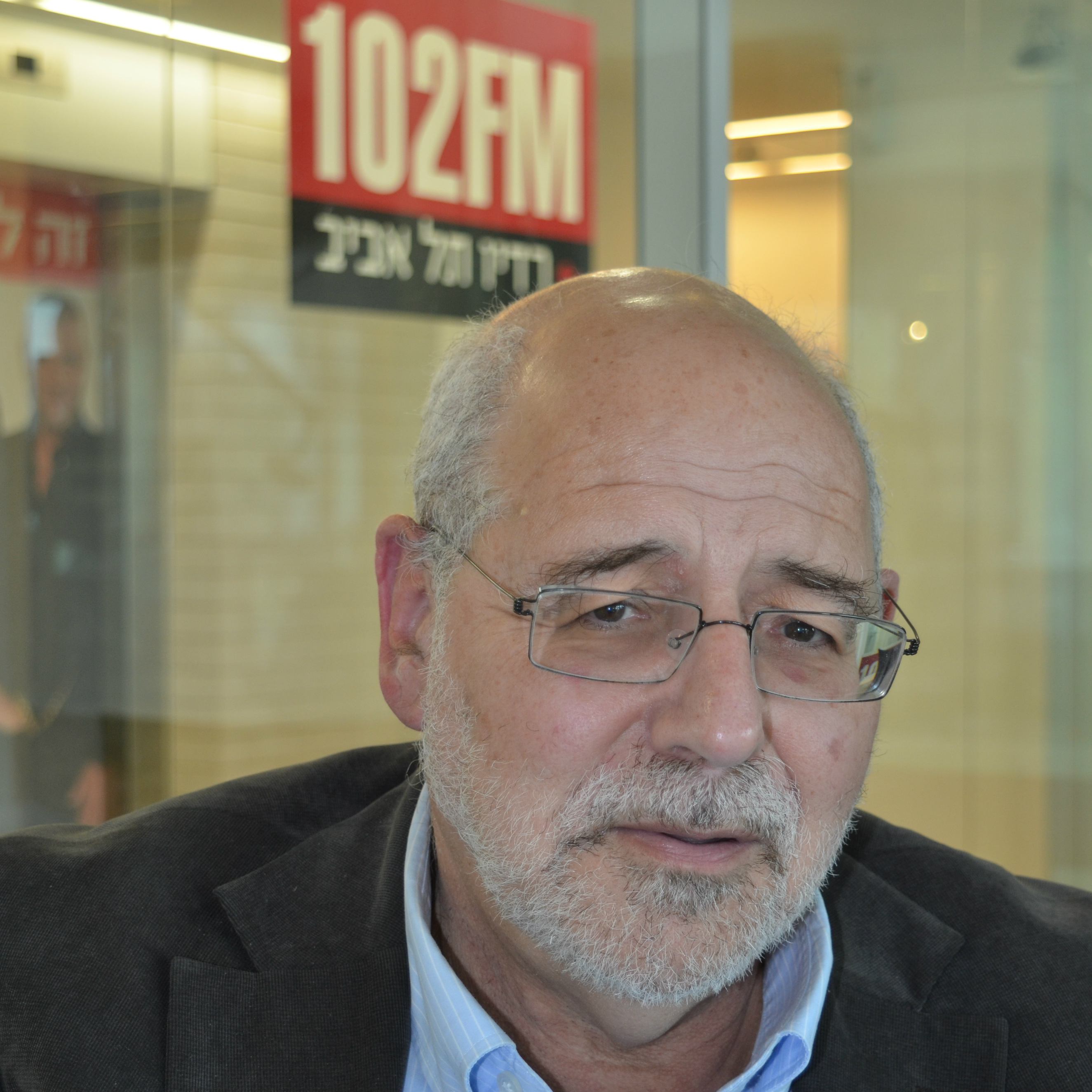
- Born: 26 March 1950 (age 76)
- Occupation: Journalism

Michael Handelzalts (Hebrew: מיכאל הנדלזלץ; born March 26, 1950) is an Israeli theater critic, journalist, translator, and editor. He is best known for his long tenure as the primary theater critic for the newspaper Haaretz, a position he held from 1975 until 2017, in addition to his various editorial roles within the paper.

== Biography ==
Handelzalts was born in Poland. His grandfather, Elyahu Handelzalc, was a teacher and writer from Warsaw, Poland who fled the city in 1939. He is believed to have been murdered by German troops in Novogrudok, along with 70 Jewish intellectuals who were rounded up and taken to an unknown destination.

Handelsaltz began his career in 1969 by writing theater reviews for the newspaper Lamerhav. From 1971 to 1981, he served at Galei Tzahal (Israel's Army Radio).

In March 1975, he began publishing theater criticism for Haaretz. His first review for the paper covered Shakespeare's "The Comedy of Errors," staged at the Cameri Theatre. Following the retirement of veteran critic Haim Gamzu, Handelsaltz assumed the role of the permanent theater critic for Haaretz. He held this influential position for 42 years, retiring in 2017.

In 2005, he launched a weekly column titled "The Last Word."

== See also ==
- Israeli culture
