= Subgroup growth =

In mathematics, subgroup growth is a branch of group theory, dealing with quantitative questions about subgroups of a given group.

Let $G$ be a finitely generated group. Then, for each integer $n$ define $a_n(G)$ to be the number of subgroups $H$ of index $n$ in $G$. Similarly, if $G$ is a topological group, $s_n(G)$ denotes the number of open subgroups $U$ of index $n$ in $G$. One similarly defines $m_n(G)$ and $s_n^\triangleleft(G)$ to denote the number of maximal and normal subgroups of index $n$, respectively.

Subgroup growth studies these functions, their interplay, and the characterization of group theoretical properties in terms of these functions.

The theory was motivated by the desire to enumerate finite groups of given order, and the analogy with Mikhail Gromov's notion of word growth.

== Nilpotent groups ==
Let $G$ be a finitely generated torsionfree nilpotent group. Then there exists a composition series with infinite cyclic factors, which induces a bijection (though not necessarily a homomorphism).

$$\mathbb{Z}^n \longrightarrow G$$

such that group multiplication can be expressed by polynomial functions in these coordinates; in particular, the multiplication is definable. Using methods from the model theory of p-adic integers, F. Grunewald, D. Segal and G. Smith showed that the local zeta function

$$\zeta_{G, p}(s) = \sum_{\nu=0}^\infty s_{p^n}(G) p^{-ns}$$

is a rational function in $p^{-s}$.

As an example, let $G$ be the discrete Heisenberg group. This group has a "presentation" with generators $x, \, y, \, z$ and relations

$$[x, y] = z, [x, z] = [y, z] = 1.$$

Hence, elements of $G$ can be represented as triples $(a,\, b, \, c)$ of integers with group operation given by

$$(a, b, c)\circ(a', b', c') = (a+a', b+b', c+c'+ab').$$

To each finite index subgroup $U$ of $G$, associate the set of all "good bases" of $U$ as follows. Note that $G$ has a normal series

$$G=\langle x, y, z\rangle\triangleright\langle y, z\rangle\triangleright\langle z\rangle\triangleright 1$$

with infinite cyclic factors. A triple $(g_1, g_2, g_3) \in G$ is called a good basis of $U$, if $g_1, g_2, g_3$ generate $U$, and $g_2\in\langle y, z\rangle, g_3\in\langle z\rangle$. In general, it is quite complicated to determine the set of good bases for a fixed subgroup $U$. To overcome this difficulty, one determines the set of all good bases of all finite index subgroups, and determines how many of these belong to one given subgroup. To make this precise, one has to embed the Heisenberg group over the integers into the group over p-adic numbers. After some computations, one arrives at the formula

$$\zeta_{G, p}(s) = \frac{1}{(1-p^{-1})^3}\int_\mathcal{M} |a_{11}|_p^{s-1} |a_{22}|_p^{s-2} |a_{33}|_p^{s-3}\;d\mu,$$

where $\mu$ is the Haar measure on $\mathbb{Z}_p$, $|\cdot|_p$ denotes the p-adic absolute value and $\mathcal{M}$ is the set of tuples of $p$-adic integers

$$\{a_{11}, a_{12}, a_{13}, a_{22}, a_{23}, a_{33}\}$$

such that

$$\{x^{a_{11}}y^{a_{12}}z^{a_{13}}, y^{a_{22}}z^{a_{23}}, z^{a_{33}}\}$$

is a good basis of some finite-index subgroup. The latter condition can be translated into

$$a_{33}|a_{11}\cdot a_{22}$$.

Now, the integral can be transformed into an iterated sum to yield

$$\zeta_{G, p}(s) = \sum_{a\geq 0}\sum_{b\geq 0}\sum_{c=0}^{a+b} p^{-as-b(s-1)-c(s-2)} = \frac{1-p^{3-3s}}{(1-p^{-s})(1-p^{1-s})(1-p^{2-2s})(1-p^{2-3s})}$$

where the final evaluation consists of repeated application of the formula for the value of the geometric series. From this we deduce that $\zeta_G (s)$ can be expressed in terms of the Riemann zeta function as

$$\zeta_G(s) = \frac{\zeta(s)\zeta(s-1)\zeta(2s-2)\zeta(2s-3)}{\zeta(3s-3)}.$$

For more complicated examples, the computations become difficult, and in general one cannot expect a closed expression for $\zeta_G(s)$. The local factor

$$\zeta_{G, p}(s)$$

can always be expressed as a definable $p$-adic integral. Applying a result of MacIntyre on the model theory of $p$-adic integers, one deduces again that $\zeta_G(s)$ is a rational function in $p^{-s}$. Moreover, M. du Sautoy and F. Grunewald showed that the integral can be approximated by Artin L-functions. Using the fact that Artin L-functions are holomorphic in a neighbourhood of the line $\Re (s)=1$, they showed that for any torsionfree nilpotent group, the function $\zeta_G(s)$ is meromorphic in the domain

$$\Re(s)>\alpha-\delta$$

where $\alpha$ is the abscissa of convergence of $\zeta_G(s)$, and $\delta$ is some positive number, and holomorphic in some neighbourhood of $\Re (s)=\alpha$. Using a Tauberian theorem this implies

$$\sum_{n\leq x} s_n(G) \sim x^\alpha\log^k x$$

for some real number $\alpha$ and a non-negative integer $k$.

== Subgroup growth and coset representations ==
Let $G$ be a group, $U$ a subgroup of index $n$. Then $G$ acts on the set of left cosets of $U$ in $G$ by left shift:

$$g(hU)=(gh)U.$$

In this way, $U$ induces a homomorphism of $G$ into the symmetric group on $G/U$. $G$ acts transitively on $G/U$, and vice versa, given a transitive action of $G$ on

$$\{1, \ldots, n\},$$

the stabilizer of the point 1 is a subgroup of index $n$ in $G$. Since the set

$$\{2, \ldots, n\}$$

can be permuted in

$$(n-1)!$$

ways, we find that $s_n(G)$ is equal to the number of transitive $G$-actions divided by $(n-1)!$. Among all $G$-actions, we can distinguish transitive actions by a sifting argument, to arrive at the following formula

$$s_n(G) = \frac{h_n(G)}{(n-1)!} - \sum_{\nu=1}^{n-1} \frac{h_{n-\nu}(G)s_\nu(G)}{(n-\nu)!},$$

where $h_n(G)$ denotes the number of homomorphisms

$$\varphi:G\rightarrow S_n.$$

In several instances the function $h_n(G)$ is easier to be approached then $s_n(G)$, and, if $h_n(G)$ grows sufficiently large, the sum is of negligible order of magnitude, hence, one obtains an asymptotic formula for $s_n(G)$.

As an example, let $F_2$ be the free group on two generators. Then every map of the generators of $F_2$ extends to a homomorphism

$$F_2\rightarrow S_n,$$

that is

$$h_n(F_2)=(n!)^2.$$

From this we deduce

$$s_n(F_2)\sim n\cdot n!.$$

For more complicated examples, the estimation of $h_n(G)$ involves the representation theory and statistical properties of symmetric groups.
