= Oren Soffer (professor) =

Israeli academic (1971–2020)

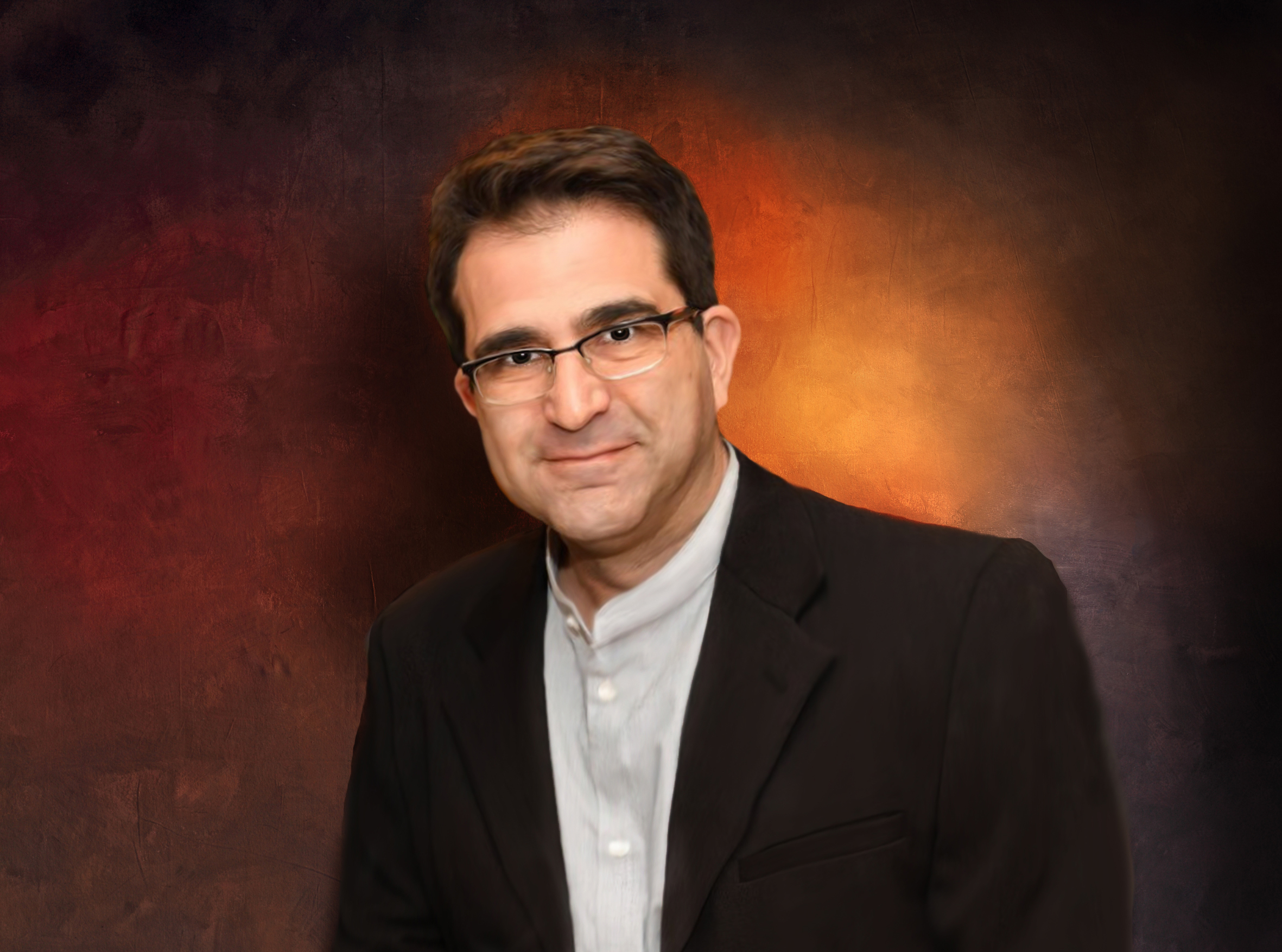
Oren Soffer, 2020

Oren Soffer (Hebrew: אורן סופר) (March 2, 1971 – December 15, 2020) was an Israeli academic in the fields of political science and mass media studies, a professor of communication in the Department of Sociology, Political Science and Media at the Open University of Israel. He also taught at other universities in Israel and abroad.

He received his Ph.D. from the Hebrew University of Jerusalem with the thesis “Ha-Tsfira” Newspaper—Modernization of the Political-Social Discourse in the Hebrew Language.

== Books ==
- 2015: 2015). Galei Tzahal, Jerusalem: Carmel (200 pp.). (Hebrew)
- 2011: Mass Communication in Israel, Ra'anana: The Open University of Israel (411 pp.). (Hebrew)
  - 2015: (English abridgen translation) Mass Communication in Israel: Nationalism, Globalization, and Segmentation, Oxford NY: Berghahn Books (227 pp.).
- 2007: There Is No Place for Pilpul! Ha-Tsfira Journal and the Modernization of the Socio-political Discourse, Mossad Bialik Press with The Center for Research on the History and Culture of Polish Jewry at the Hebrew University (240 pp.) (Hebrew)
