= Menachem Begin Heritage Center =

Israeli state memorial

Coordinates: 31.7692°N 35.2257°E

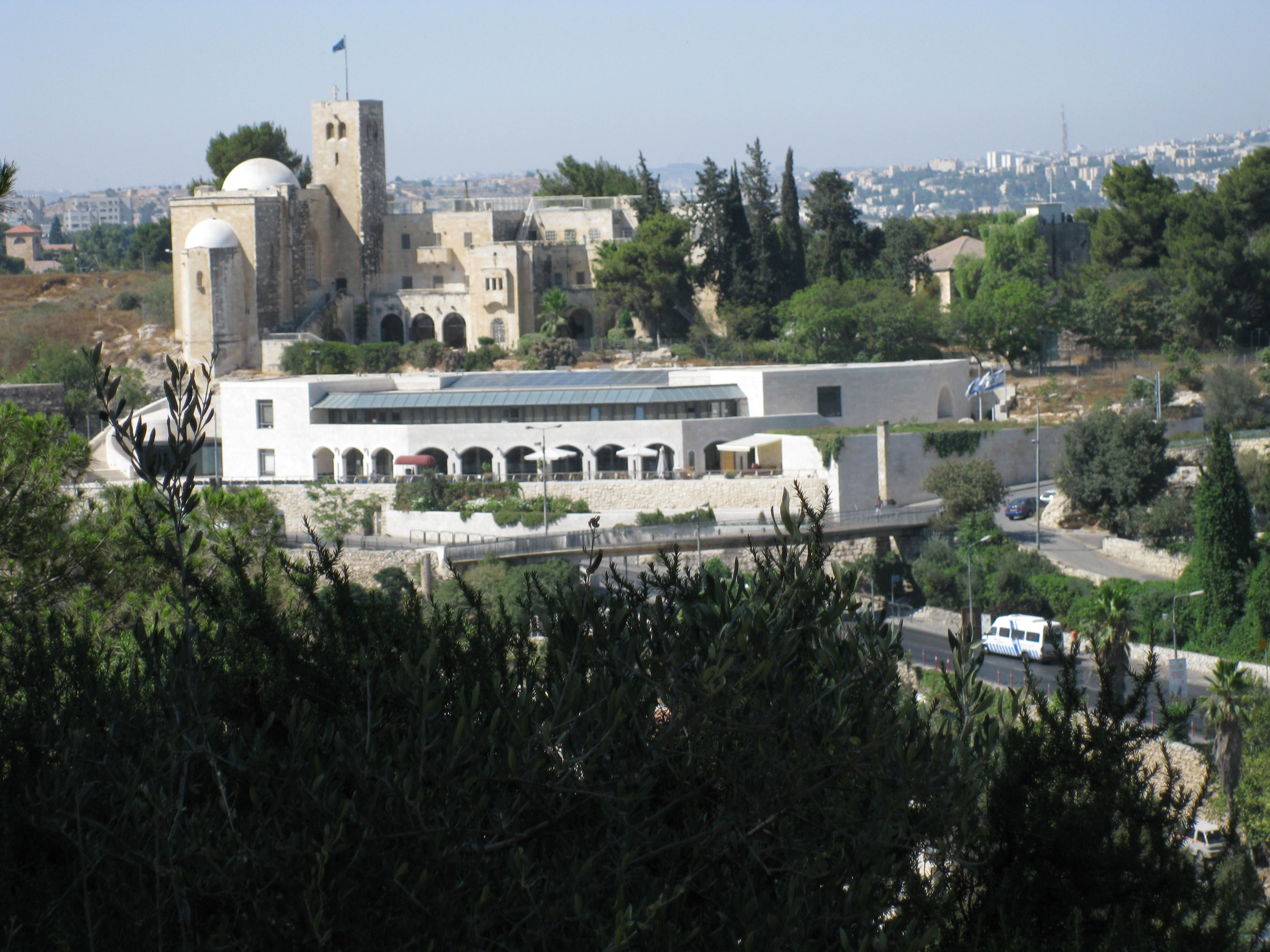
Menachem Begin Heritage Center, Jerusalem

The Menachem Begin Heritage Center (Hebrew: מרכז מורשת מנחם בגין, Merkaz Moreshet Menachem Begin) is the official state memorial commemorating Menachem Begin, Israel's sixth Prime Minister. The center is located on the Hinnom Ridge, overlooking Mount Zion and walls of the Old City of Jerusalem.

== Museum ==
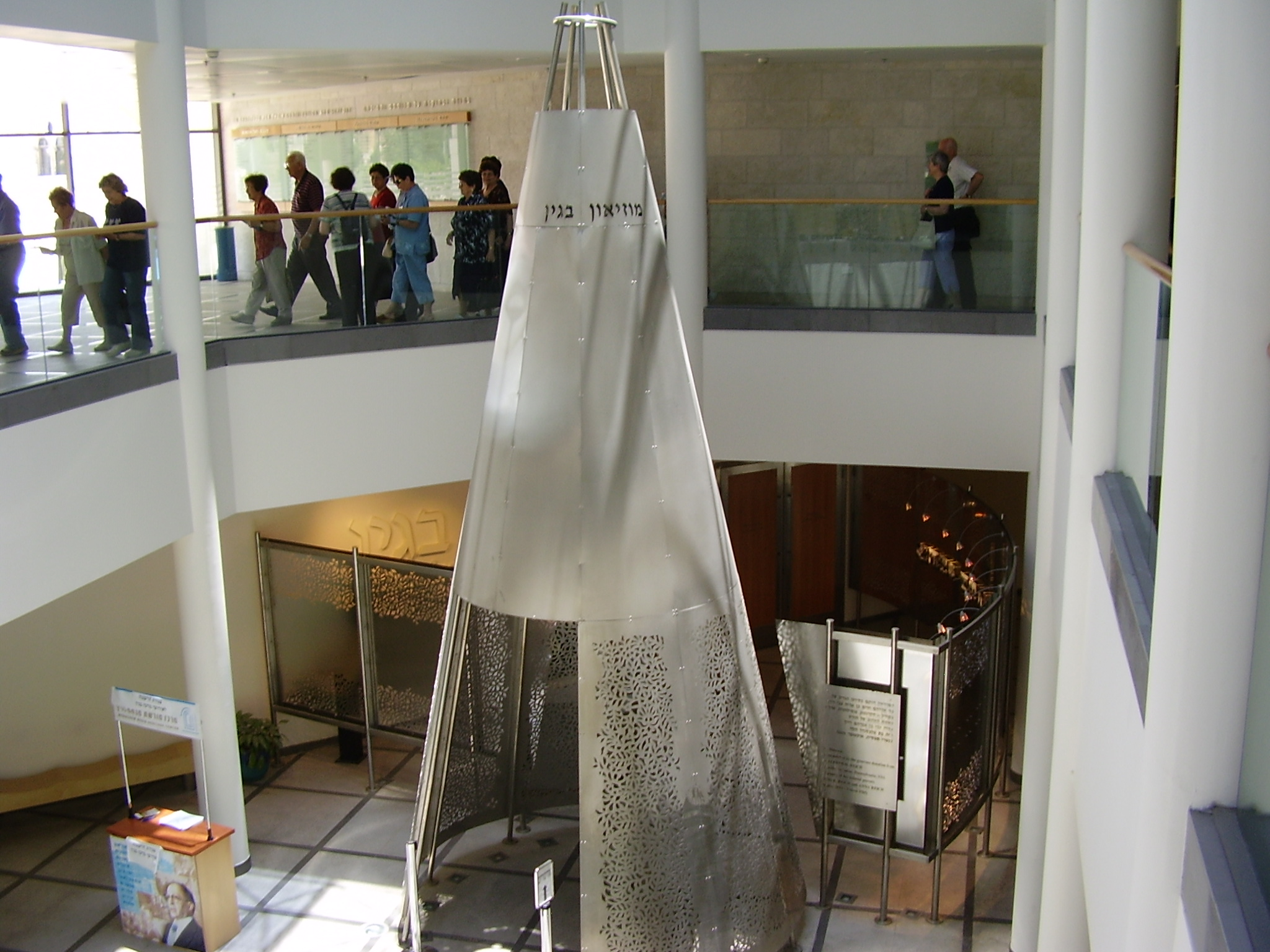
Interior of the Menachem Begin Heritage Center

On March 28, 1998, the Knesset passed the Menachem Begin Commemoration Law as an official state memorial project to establish a Center that would preserve the achievements and legacy of Menachem Begin and serve as a Research Institute of the Struggle for the Independence of Israel and its future security and development. The center was officially opened by Prime Minister Ariel Sharon, on June 16, 2004.

The museum tells the story of the life of Menachem Begin, from his childhood in Poland, his years as the commander of the Irgun, the Leader of the Opposition in the Knesset, and as Prime Minister of the State of Israel, by means of multimedia exhibits that include historical reconstructions and reenactments, documentary videos, interactive touch screen exhibits, presentations and surround sound narration. The library contains books on various research areas connected to the museum, and also holds books from Menachem Begin's personal library.

== Begin Prize ==
The Begin Center awards an annual prize to a person or organization that has done important work for the benefit of the State of Israel and/or Jewish people. Past recipients of the prize include Ilan Ramon, the Israeli astronaut who died in the Columbia disaster; Kaare Kristiansen, a Norwegian statesman who quit the Nobel Prize Committee when the prize was awarded to Yasser Arafat; and Rabbi Avraham Elimelech Firer, founder of Ezra L'Marpeh, a society that guides people seeking medical treatment. In November 2013, it was announced that the recipient would be NGO Monitor, a watchdog organization that states it monitors organizations which claim to be safeguarding human rights while engaging in political advocacy that promotes anti-Israel and anti-Jewish sentiment.

== Archives ==
The onsite archives collect all historical material directly connected with the life and achievements of Menachem Begin and are part of the Israel State Archive.

== Research and education ==
The Research Institute of the Begin Heritage Center sponsors conferences, lectures and colloquia in cooperation with universities and other research centers.

The center operates varied programs and tours for students, soldiers, and youth visiting from abroad. It also offers the "Junior Knesset" educational program, for middle school pupils, to enhance civic education and the study of Israel's parliamentary system.

In June 2013, the center helped to organize a special ceremony marking Begin's 100th birthday in his hometown, Brest, in Belarus. The ceremony took place in front of the school that Begin attended as a child, Tahkemoni School on Kuybeshava Street.

== Archaeological garden ==
Archaeological discoveries at the site of the museum dating back to the First Temple period are preserved in the Al Reich Archeological Garden, including ancient burial caves (the site called Ketef Hinnom), in which a silver scroll pendant containing the biblical Priestly Blessing (Numbers 6:24–26) in ancient Hebrew script was found.

== See also ==
- List of Israeli museums
- Tourism in Israel
