= Binyamin Eliav =

Israeli journalist (1909–1974)

Binyamin Eliav (Hebrew: בנימין אליאב; born Binyamin Lubotzky; 1909 in Riga – July 30, 1974, in Petah Tikva) was an Israeli politician, diplomat, author and editor. One of the founders of Betar, he was a close associate of revisionist leader Ze'ev Jabotinsky, but later became a member of the labour party, Mapai.

Binyamin Lubotzky was born in Riga, Governorate of Livonia, Russian Empire, and immigrated to Mandatory Palestine in 1925.

His memoirs, Zikhronot min hayamin (Memories of the Right) describe his ideological shift to the left. According to the memoirs' editor Danny Rubinstein, Eliav could have been a rising star in Israeli politics but failed due to his inability to deal with political intrigue.

As a diplomat, he served as Israel's First Secretary in Buenos Aires and subsequently as Consul General in New York. He was also an editor of the Encyclopaedia Judaica.
