= Asael Lubotzky =

Israeli physician, writer, and researcher

Asael Lubotzky עשהאל לובוצקי
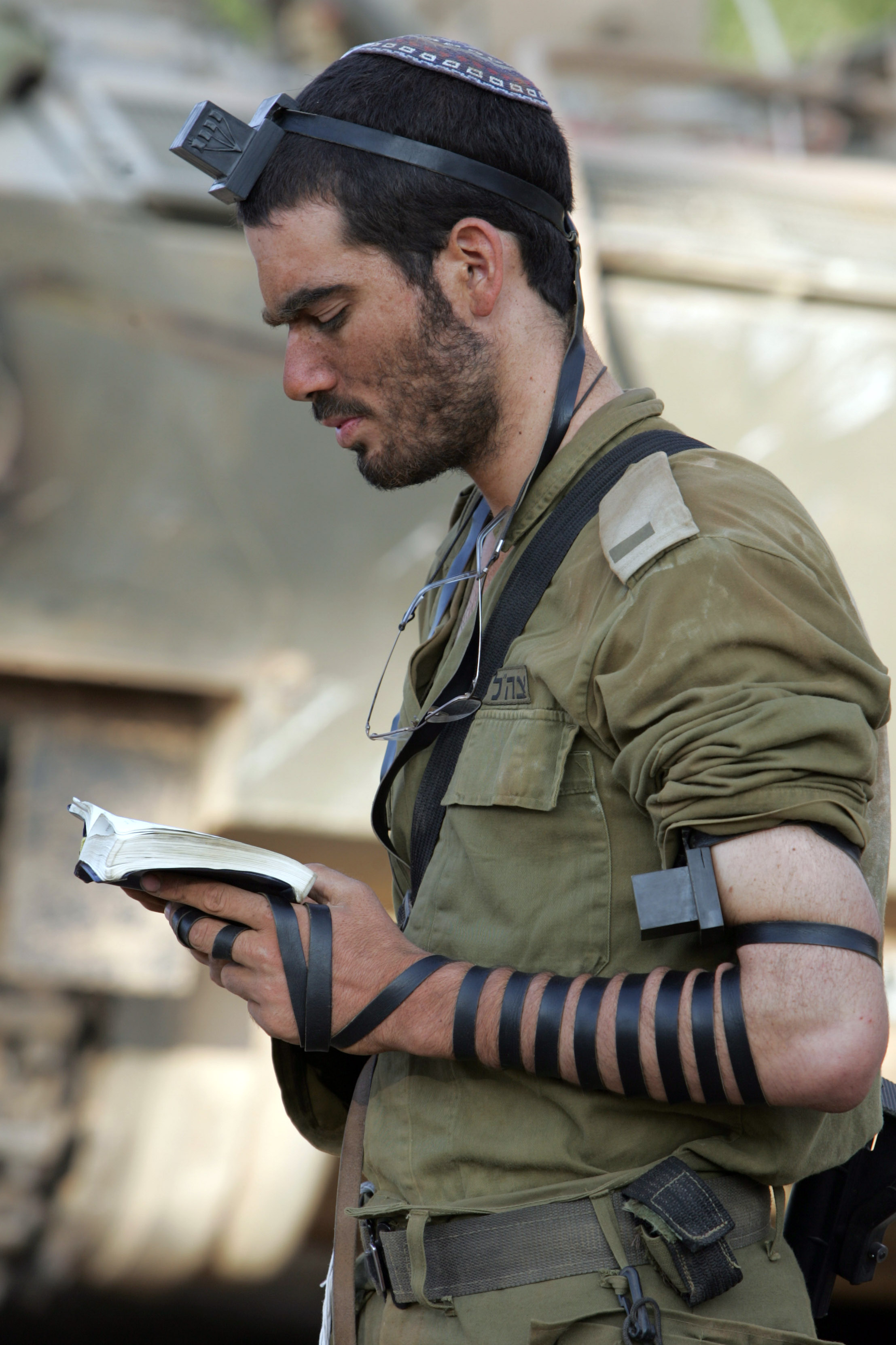
- Lubotzky in prayer, 2006
- Born: 1983 (age 42–43); Jerusalem, Israel
- Education: Hebrew University of Jerusalem (BA); Hadassah Medical School (M.D.); Hebrew University of Jerusalem (PhD); Shaare Zedek Medical Center (Residency); Hospital for Sick Children (Toronto) (Fellowship)
- Known for: From the Wilderness and Lebanon; Not My Last Journey
- Relatives: Professor Alex Lubotzky (father)
- Medical career
- Profession: Pediatrician, researcher, writer
- Institutions: Hebrew University of Jerusalem; Shaare Zedek Medical Center; Hospital for Sick Children (Toronto)
- Research: Epigenetics, Cell-free DNA
- Awards: The Leitersdorf Award for significant contribution to the arts (2017); Medal of Distinguished Rehabilitation (2017); The James Sivartsen Prize in Cancer Research (2019); Rothschild Fellowship (2022); Ben Barres Spotlight Award (2023)

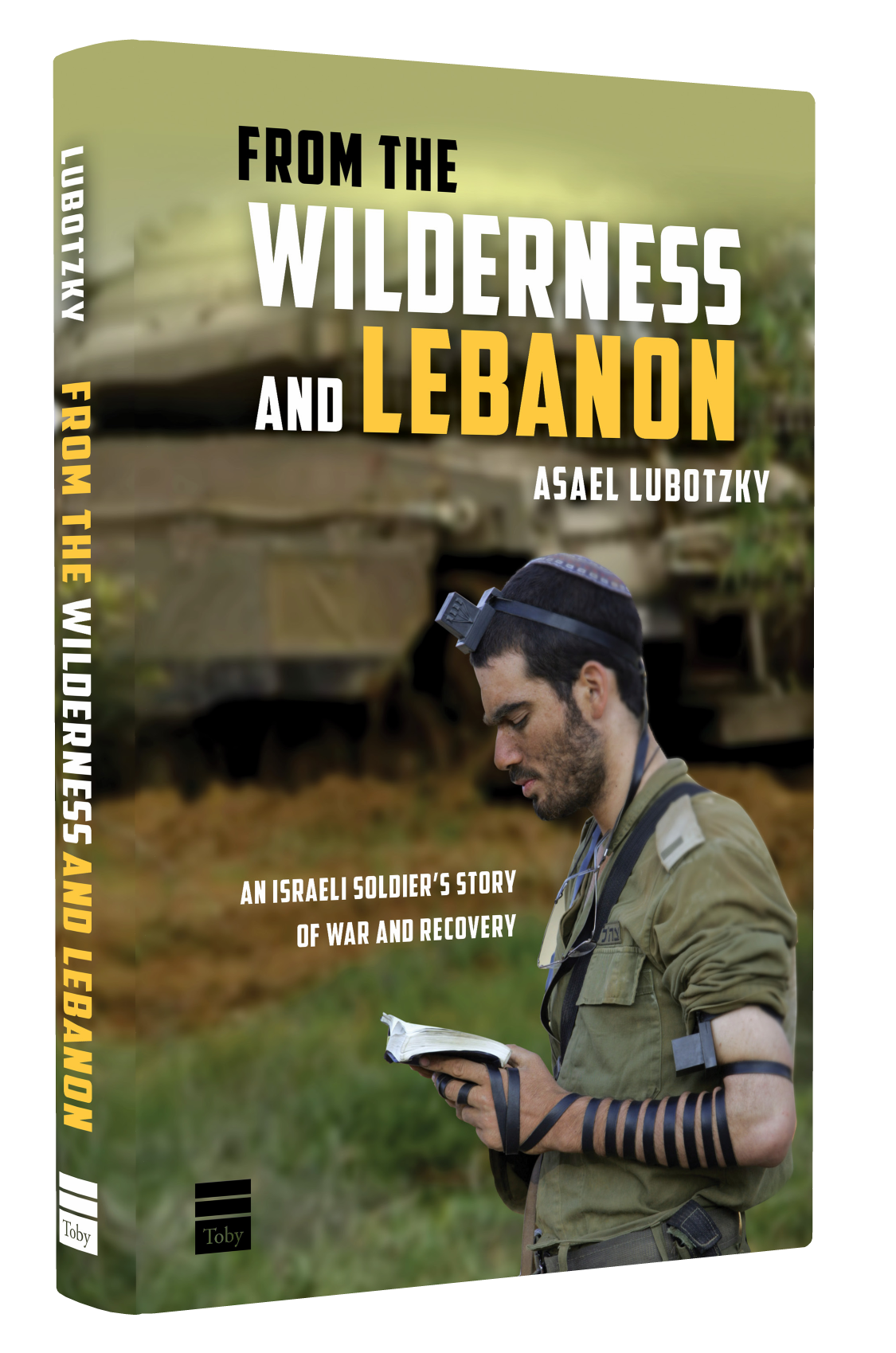
From the Wilderness and Lebanon

Asael Lubotzky (Hebrew: עשהאל לובוצקי; born 1983) is an Israeli physician, author, and molecular biologist. Formerly an officer in the Israel Defense Forces (IDF), he is a combat veteran of the Second Lebanon War.

== Early life and military service ==
Asael Lubotzky was born in 1983 with a twin sibling. He would become the eldest of six children. He grew up in Efrat, studied at the Hesder yeshiva in Ma'ale Adumim, was accepted to Shayetet 13, but chose to enlist in Golani's 51st Battalion. He underwent a training course as a combat soldier and was chosen as the outstanding company cadet. After completing Officer Candidate School Asael served as an officer commanding a platoon of the Golani Brigade. He led his platoon in operations in Gaza and, during the Second Lebanon War, fought in many battles in which many of his comrades were killed and wounded, until his own severe injury in the Battle of Bint Jbeil left him with a disability.

== Medical and research career ==
Following his rehabilitation, Lubotzky pursued a medical degree at the Hebrew University Hadassah Medical School, qualified as a doctor, and specialized in pediatrics at the Shaare Zedek Hospital in Jerusalem. and continued to a Neurology Fellowship. Additionally, Lubotzky completed a fellowship in Neonatal Neurology at The Hospital for Sick Children (SickKids) in Toronto, Canada.

Lubotzky conducted research in the lab of professor Haim Cedar and became a PhD student under Professor Yuval Dor and Ruth Shemer at the Hebrew University's Department of Developmental Biology and Cancer Research, who works on methylation patterns of circulating cell-free DNA (cfDNA). Lubotzky was recognized for his studies on cfDNA as cancer diagnostic markers, and his research has earned him several honors, including the Israel Cancer Research Fund (ICRF) cancer grant and in 2019, he was awarded The James Sivartsen Prize in Cancer Research by The Hebrew University.

In 2020 his research team received a prestigious grant of $500,000 from the Bill & Melinda Gates Foundation and Alzheimer's Drug Discovery Foundation towards their research on early diagnosis of Alzheimer's disease based on blood tests.

In 2021 he received the Joint Award of the National Institute of Psychobiology in Israel (NIPI) and the Israeli Society of Biological Psychiatry.

In 2021 he was awarded a PhD for a thesis entitled: "Liquid Biopsies Reveal Collateral Tissue Damage in Cancer and Brain Damage in Neural Pathologies". His findings demonstrated that metastatic tumors cause collateral tissue damage, releasing cfDNA from affected organs, and that cfDNA methylation patterns can help pinpoint metastases and their tissue origins.

In 2022 he received The Rothschild Fellowship for young scholars of outstanding academic merit. In the same year, Lubotzky and his colleagues published a study showing that brain cells die during psychotic episodes, with higher levels of brain-derived cfDNA detected in patients experiencing psychotic symptoms, compared to healthy controls. The finding would serve as a proof of concept for brain-derived cell-free DNA as biomarkers of psychosis.

In 2023, Lubotzky received the Ben Barres Spotlight Award by eLife for his research towards understanding brain dynamics.

== Writing ==
Lubotzky's first book, From the Wilderness and Lebanon, recounting his wartime experiences and rehabilitation, was published in 2008 by Yedioth Ahronoth, The book became a best-seller, received critical acclaim and was translated into English. His second book, Not My Last Journey, which chronicles the life story of his grandfather, the partisan and Irgun officer Iser Lubotzky, was published in Hebrew in 2017 by Yedioth Books and Menachem Begin Heritage Center.

Lubotzky won the Leitersdorf Prize for the Arts for 2017. Lubotzky lectures on various topics in Israel and internationally.

== Personal life ==
Asael Lubotzky is the son of Alex Lubotzky and grandson of Iser Lubotzky and Murray Roston. He lives in Jerusalem, is married to Avital (Schimmel), a medical psychologist and they have six children.

== Books ==
- מן המדבר והלבנון (Min HaMidbar VeHaLevanon), Yedioth Ahronoth, 2008
- From the Wilderness and Lebanon, The Toby Press, Koren Publishers Jerusalem, 2016. English translation of the previous book by Professor Murray Roston
- לא דרכי האחרונה (Not My Last Journey), Yedioth Ahronoth & Menachem Begin Heritage Center, 2017
