= Jerusalem Biennale =

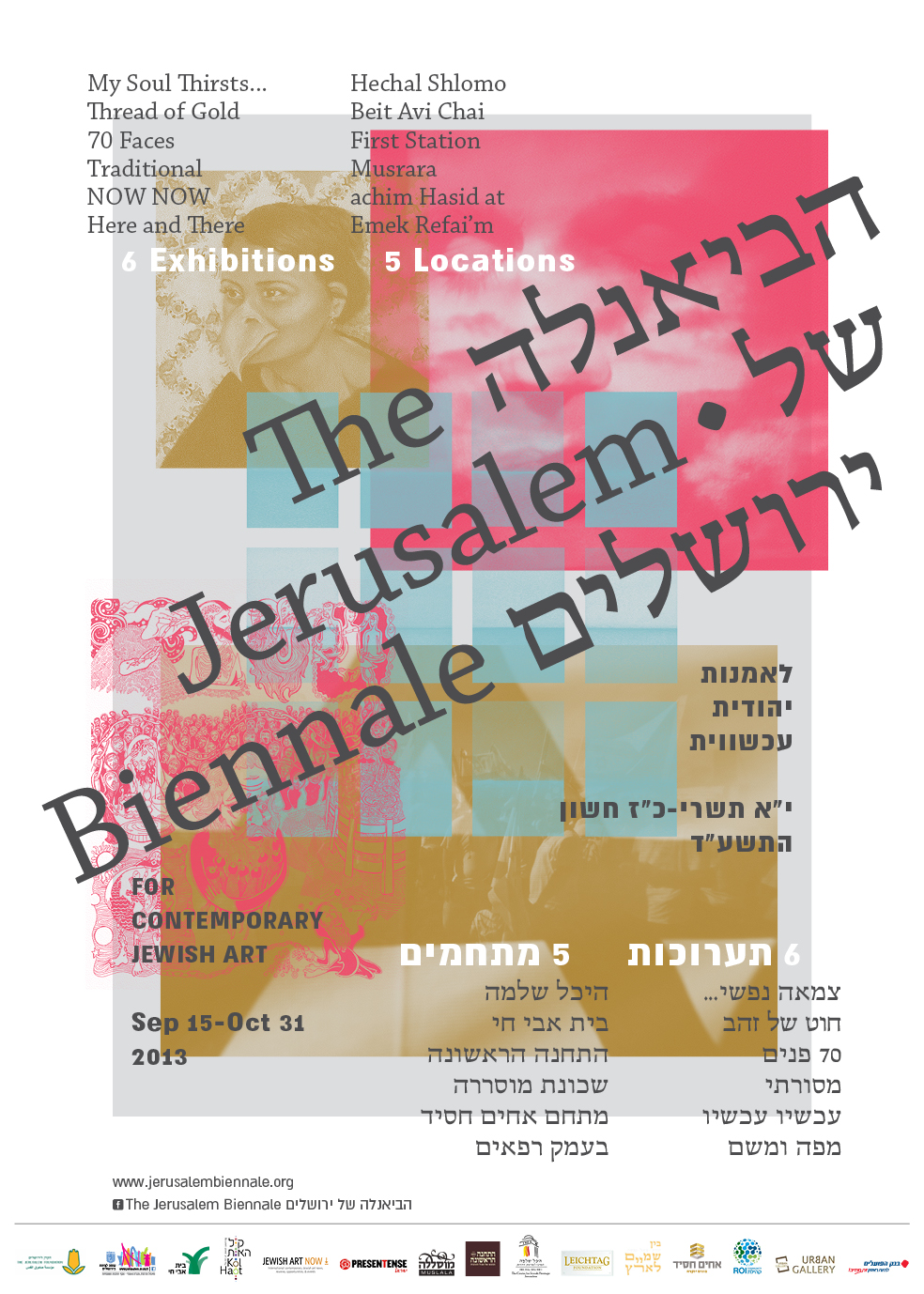
- The poster for the first Jerusalem Biennale that was held in 2013
- Frequency: Biennial, every two years
- Location: Jerusalem
- Country: Israel
- Website: https://jerusalembiennale.org/

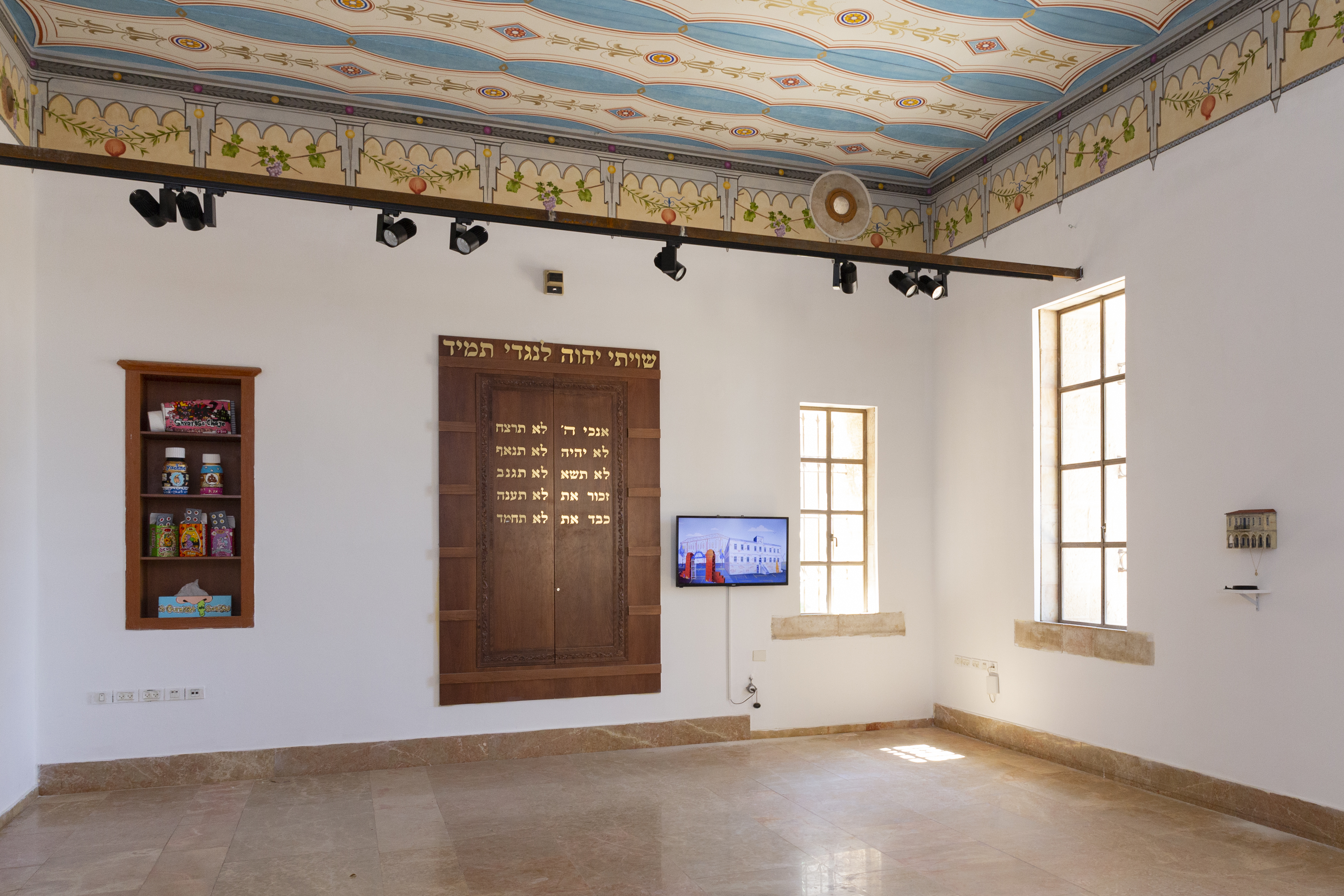
The new permanent gallery of the Biennale at Jaffa street, 161

The Jerusalem Biennale is a contemporary art event which has taken place biannually since 2013. Exhibits are held in different historical and modern locations around Jerusalem, with a focus on where the contemporary art world and the Jewish world of content intersect. The Biennale is a stage for professional artists whose work references Jewish thought, spirit, tradition or experience, to exhibit their work in Jerusalem. The Jerusalem Biennale is a member of the Biennial Foundation, together with more than a 100 Biennales from around the world.

== History ==
2013 Jerusalem Biennale

The 1st Jerusalem Biennale was produced by Ram Ozeri and held in Fall 2013. Participation was by invitation only and the art was showcased in 5 venues located around the city. The Biennale hosted works by more than 60 artists, most of them from Israel, and raised the questions of “What is Contemporary Jewish Art?” and “Does the category even exist?”

2015 Jerusalem Biennale

The 2nd edition was marked by a retrospective of the work of Moshe Zabari and a group exhibition by New York-based artists. The main exhibition was a group show entitled, ‘‘Jerusalem. Passages’’ with the works of Brazilian artist Pablo Lobato and Israeli artists Ynin Shillo Sigalit Landau and Motti Mizrachi. A broader range of perspectives was presented with a larger portion of non-Israeli artists taking part. The title, Present Work, symbolized the search for a link between Jerusalem and Jewish communities all over the world.

2017 Jerusalem Biennale

With the new record of number of national representations, the 3rd Biennale, introduced a Watershed moment: it was the largest gathering of Contemporary Jewish Art enthusiasts in the history of Jerusalem. The theme of Watershed, as a geological term, examines the water pattern of streams and rivers that split and converge but can also be used as a metaphor for the way people split and converge as individuals and groups. It is used to state a moment of an important twist – an event that changed the course of history.

A two-day conference, titled “Watershed: Boundaries and Spaces in Contemporary Jewish Art,” was held in cooperation with the Van Leer Jerusalem Research Institute and the Inspire Education Program launched for the first time. Five hundred high school students from Israel’s geographical and social periphery visited the Biennale as part of this program.

2019 Jerusalem Biennale

50,000 visitors ensured the success of this exhibition, whose hosted works by 243 artists in 31 exhibitions in 14 locations across Jerusalem. Sixty-one events took place in gallery spaces, including live music, dance and theater, discussion panels, poetry readings and workshops. The title of the edition was For Heaven’s Sake!, originating from a well known Hebrew phrase Leshem Shamayim, and representing opposing viewpoints that are at the heart of Jewish discourse, debate and argument. Once again the exhibition demonstrated its highly contemporary character by presenting works mostly produced especially for the JB2019.

2021 Jerusalem Biennale

The Fifth Edition of The Jerusalem Biennale took place at the end of 2021 (November 11 – December 30) under the title of Four Cubits (ארבע אמות). In Jewish tradition, the term Four Cubits (ארבע אמות) is used to point out a person’s private space. A cubit, or Ama in Hebrew, is an ancient measurement of length of about 0.5 meters. Four cubits are therefore about 2 meters – the 2 meters radius circle surrounding a person is his/her personal space.

The program consisted of three major components: Take Me Home, Venues and PHASEs. All three had an in-person and online presence, according to the hybrid model.

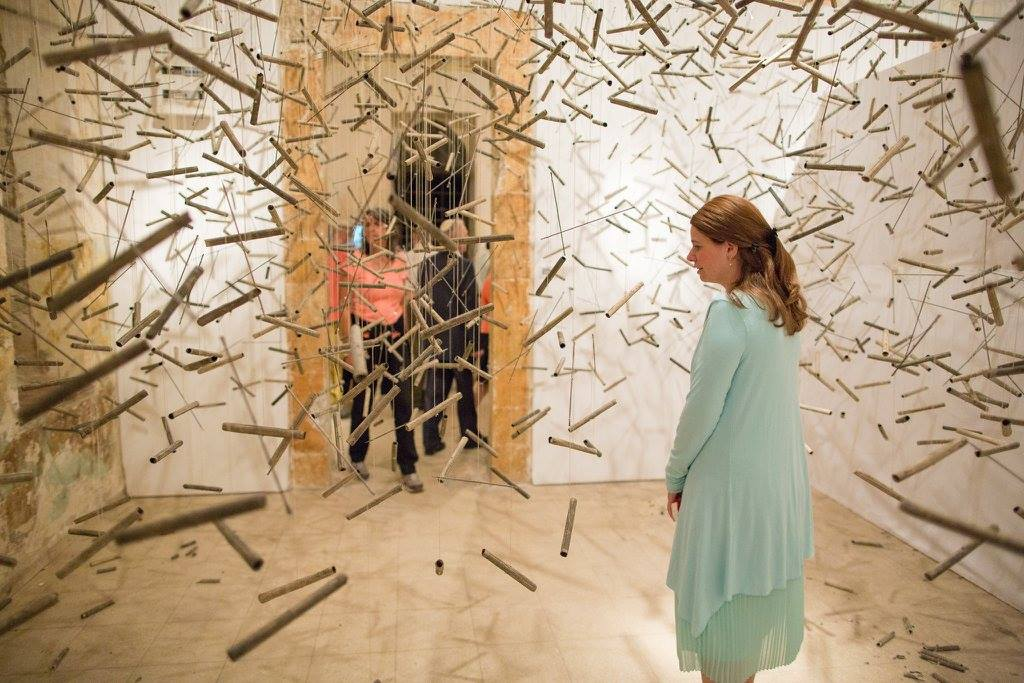
Andi Arnovitz's art work at the 2nd Biennale

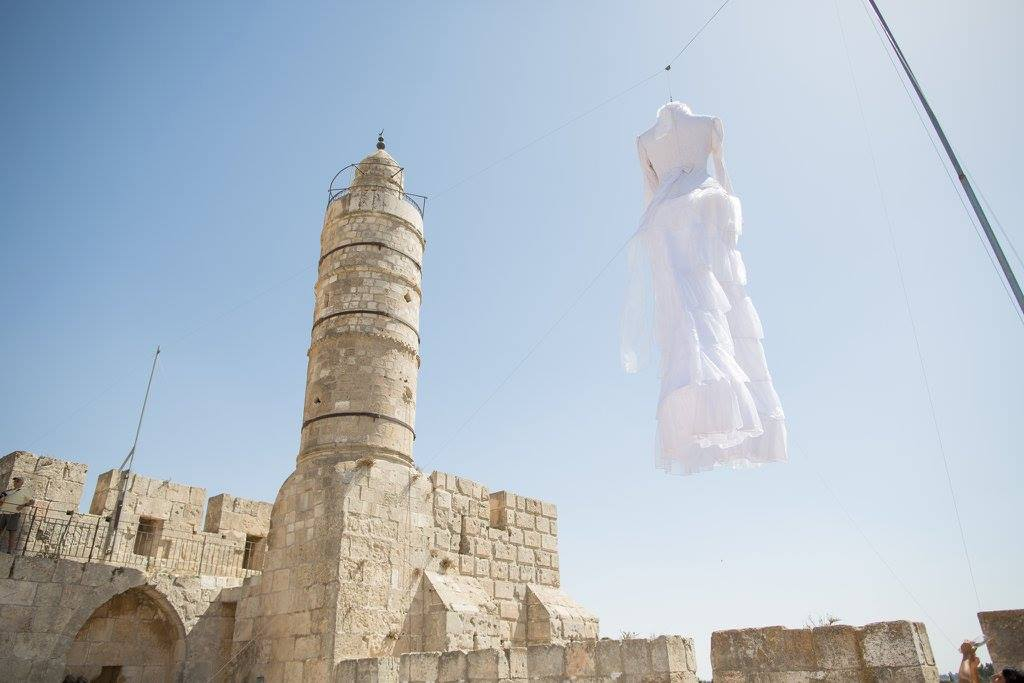
Installation of Sigalit Landau, Tower of David Museum, 2015

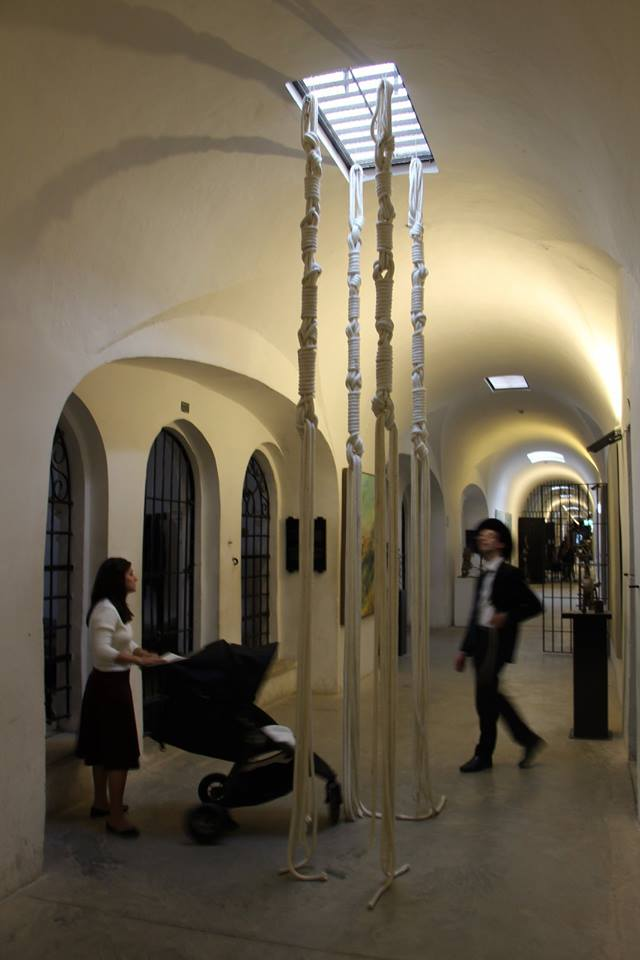
Arik Weiss art work at the Museum of the underground prisoners, 2017.

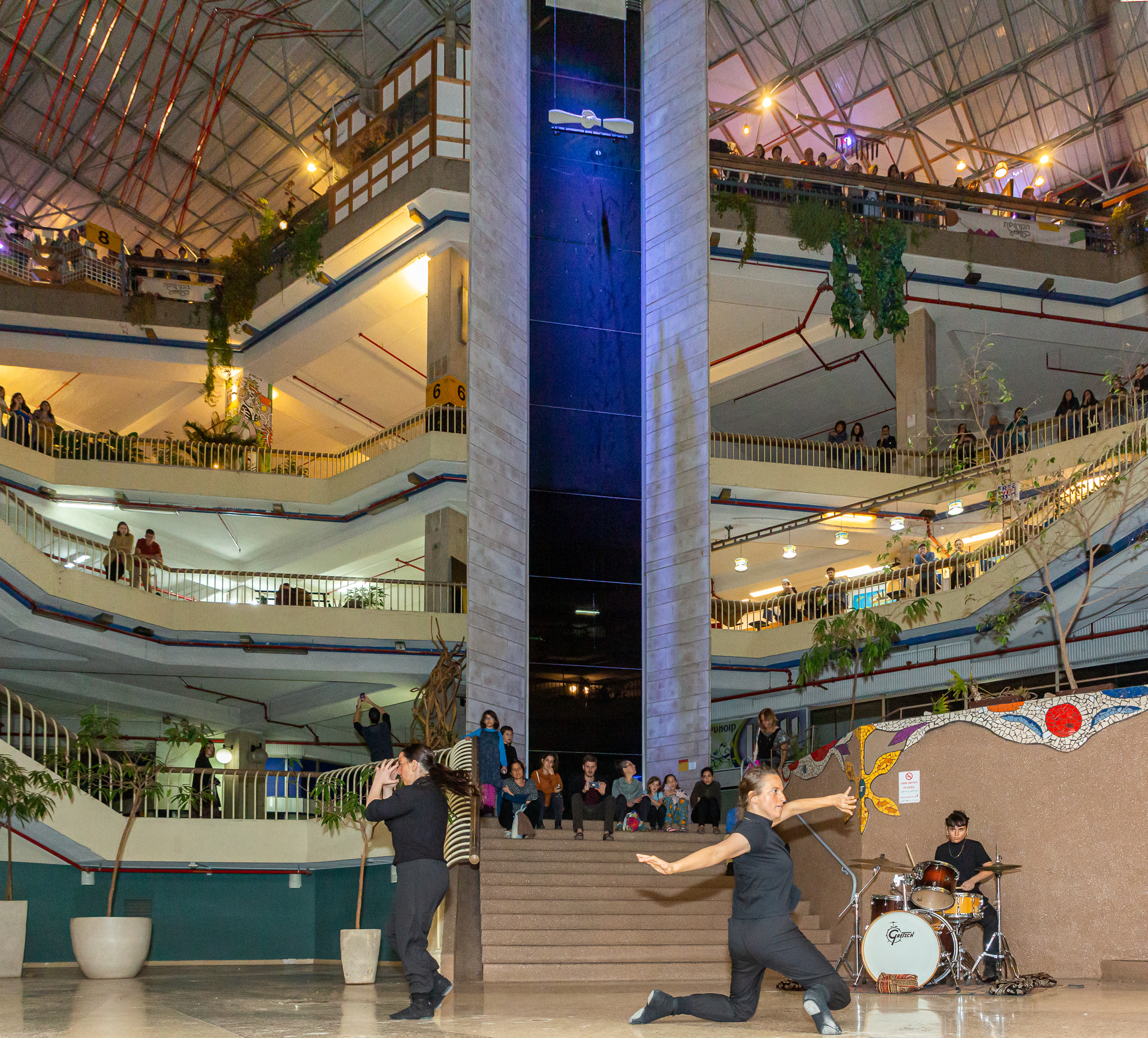
Opening event at Muslala, Clal Center the 4th Biennale

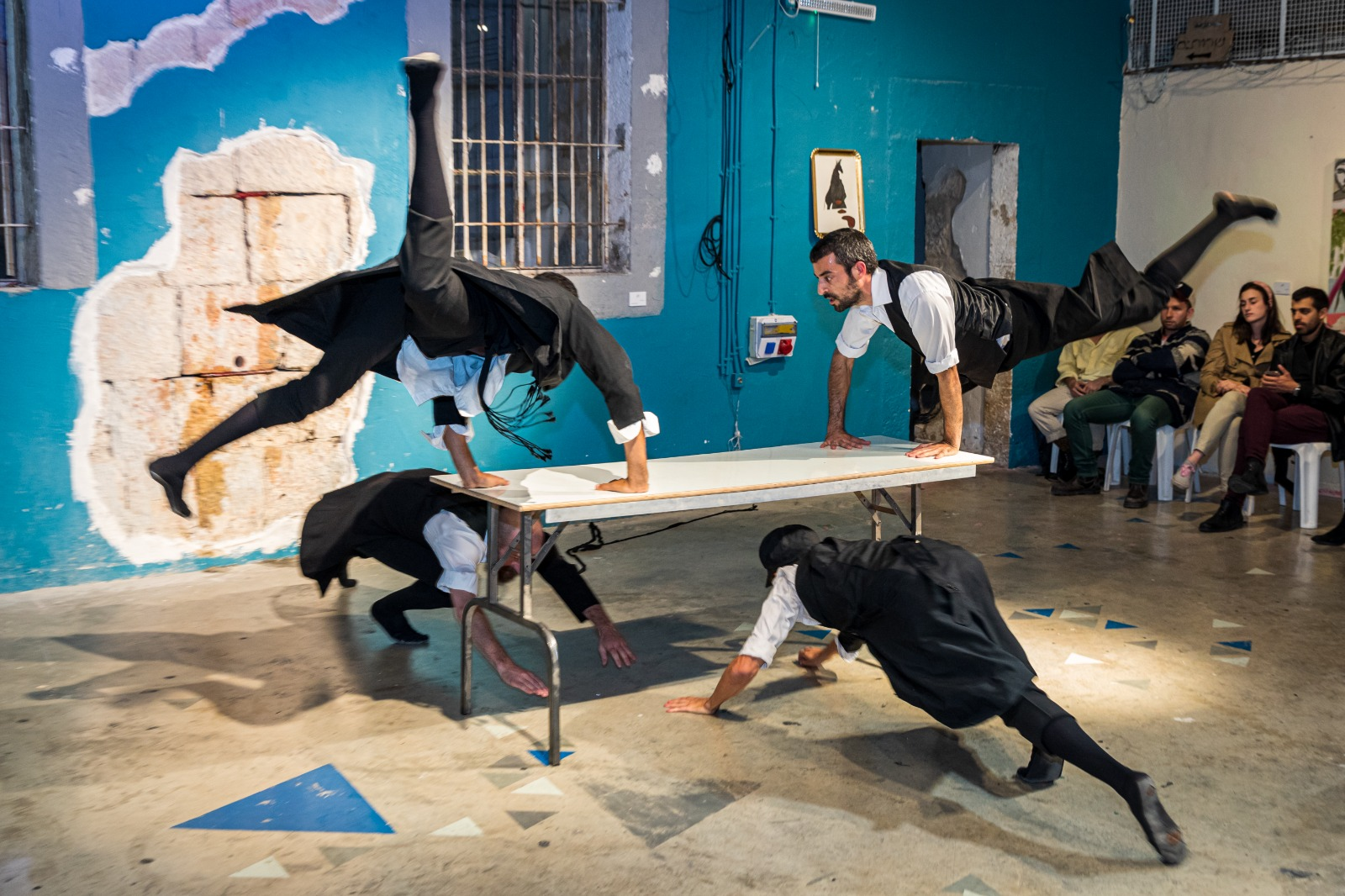
"Ka'et" show, Alliance House. Biennale 2019

In Between

The Jerusalem Biennale produces art exhibitions and events all year long. The Biennale has exhibited art exhibitions in New York, Los Angeles, Miami, San Diego, London, Ancona (north Italy) and Tel Aviv. Exhibitions that were planned for 2020 in Buenos Aires, New York and London were cancelled due to COVID-19. The Biennale created the 2020 Online Program that included interviews with 10 artists from 10 cities around the world.

== Notable artists ==
- Marina Abramović
- Andi Arnovitz
- Lynne Avadenka
- Shai Azoulay
- Sigalit Landau
- Motti Mizrachi
- Michael Sgan-Cohen
- Avner Sher
- Sari Srulovitch
- James Surls
- Micha Ullman
- Ruth Weisberg
- Maya Zack

== Venues gallery ==
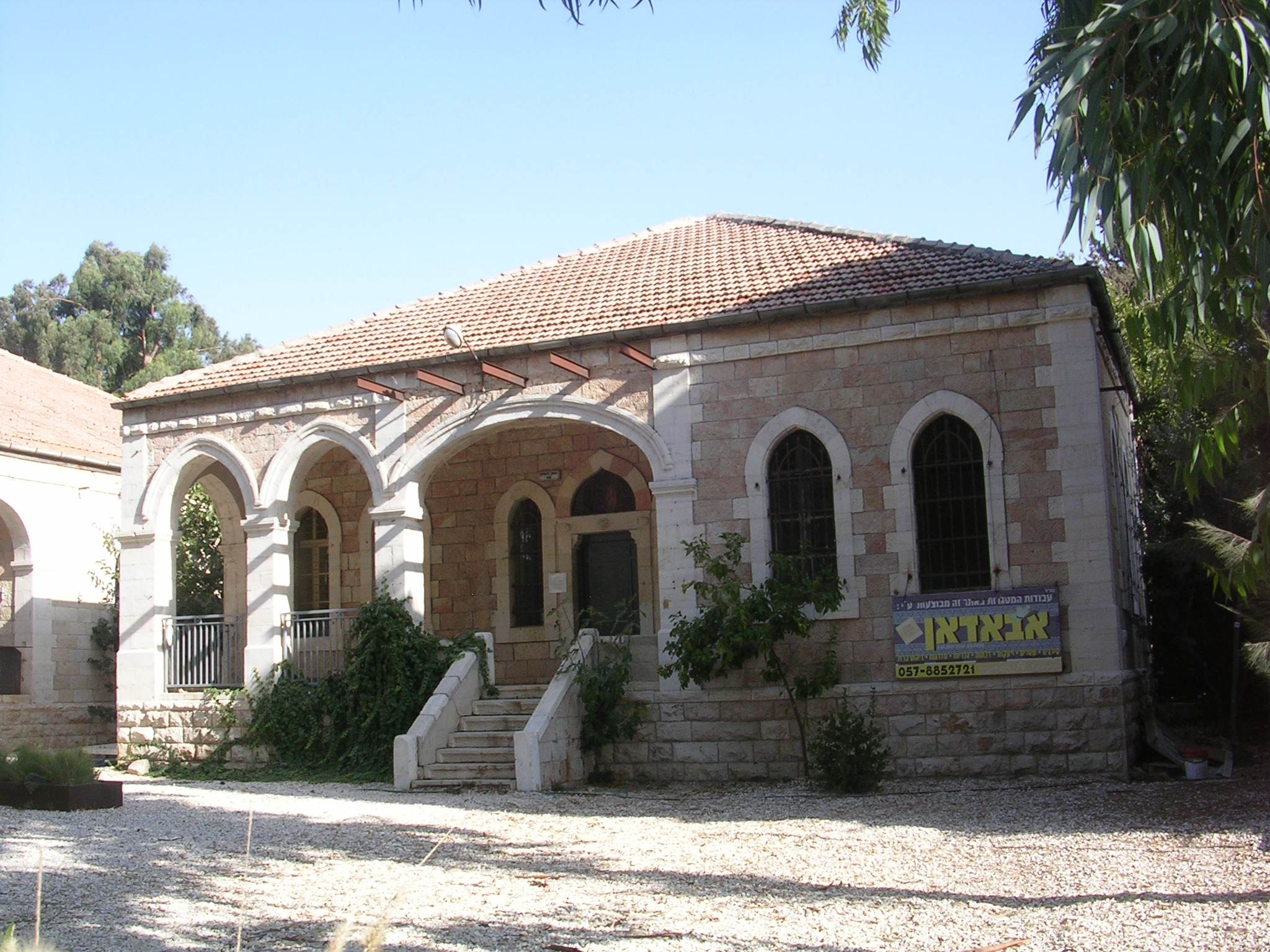
Achim Chasid Gallery, Emek Refaim street

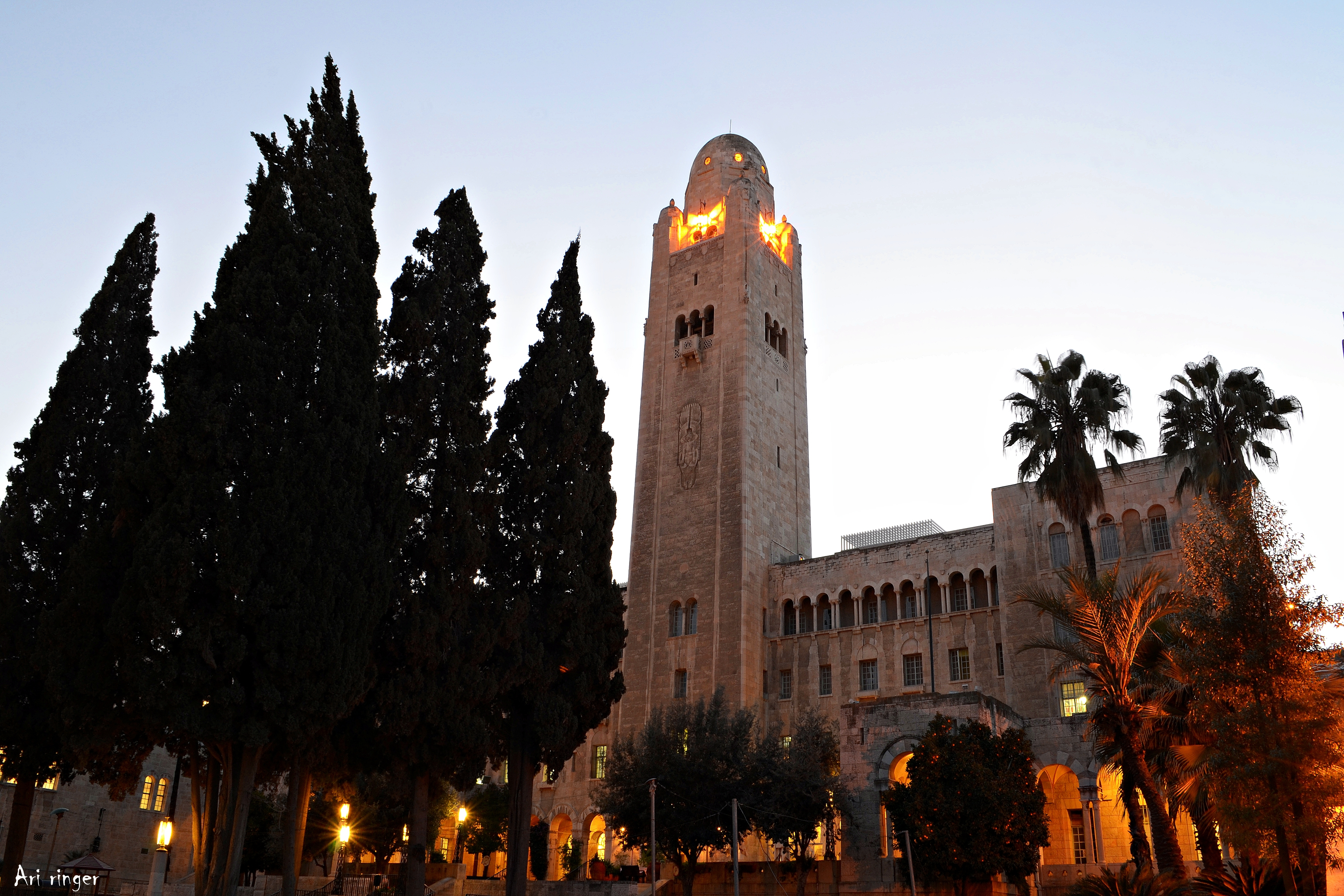
YMCA Jerusalem

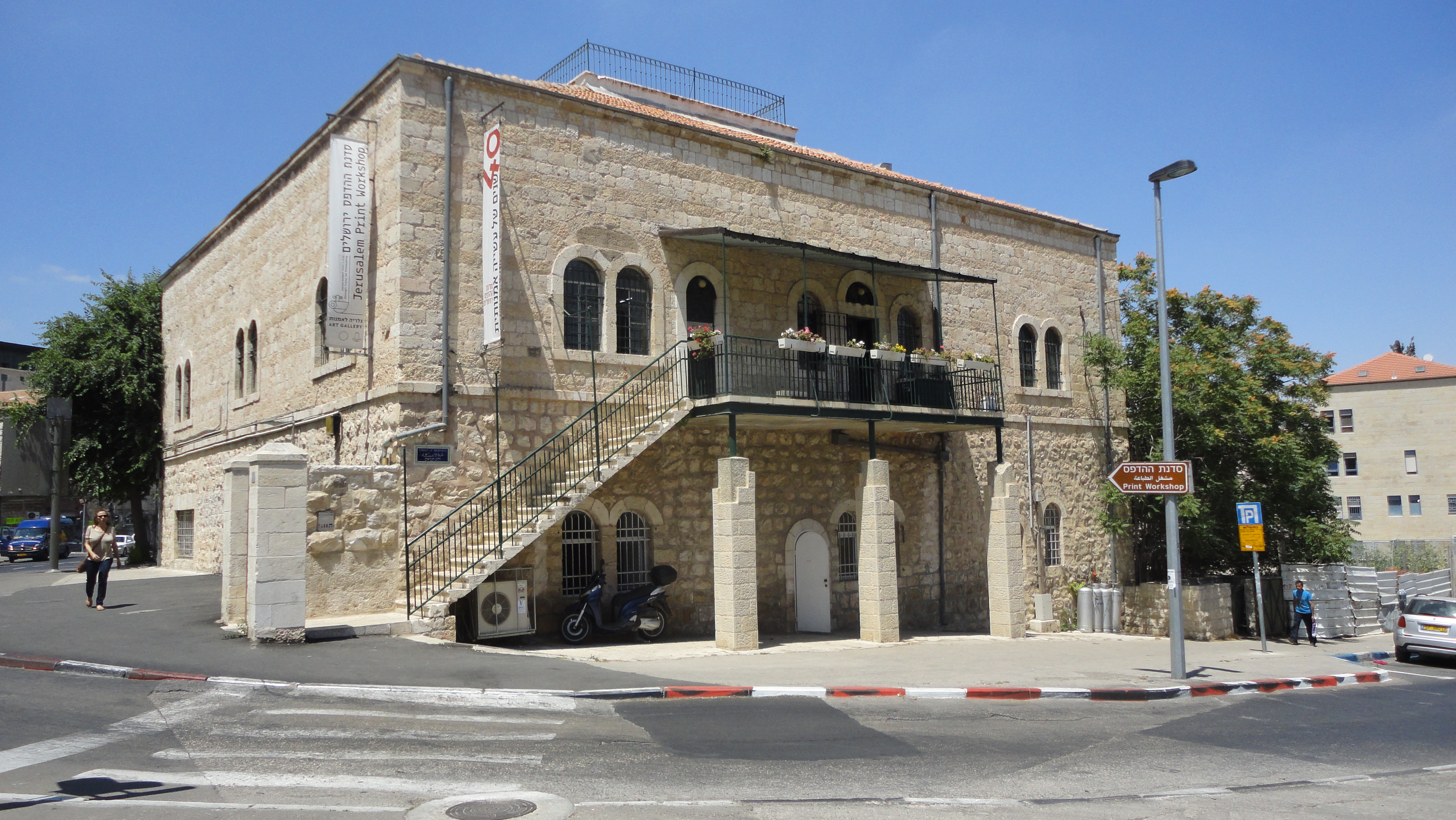
Jerusalem Print Workshop

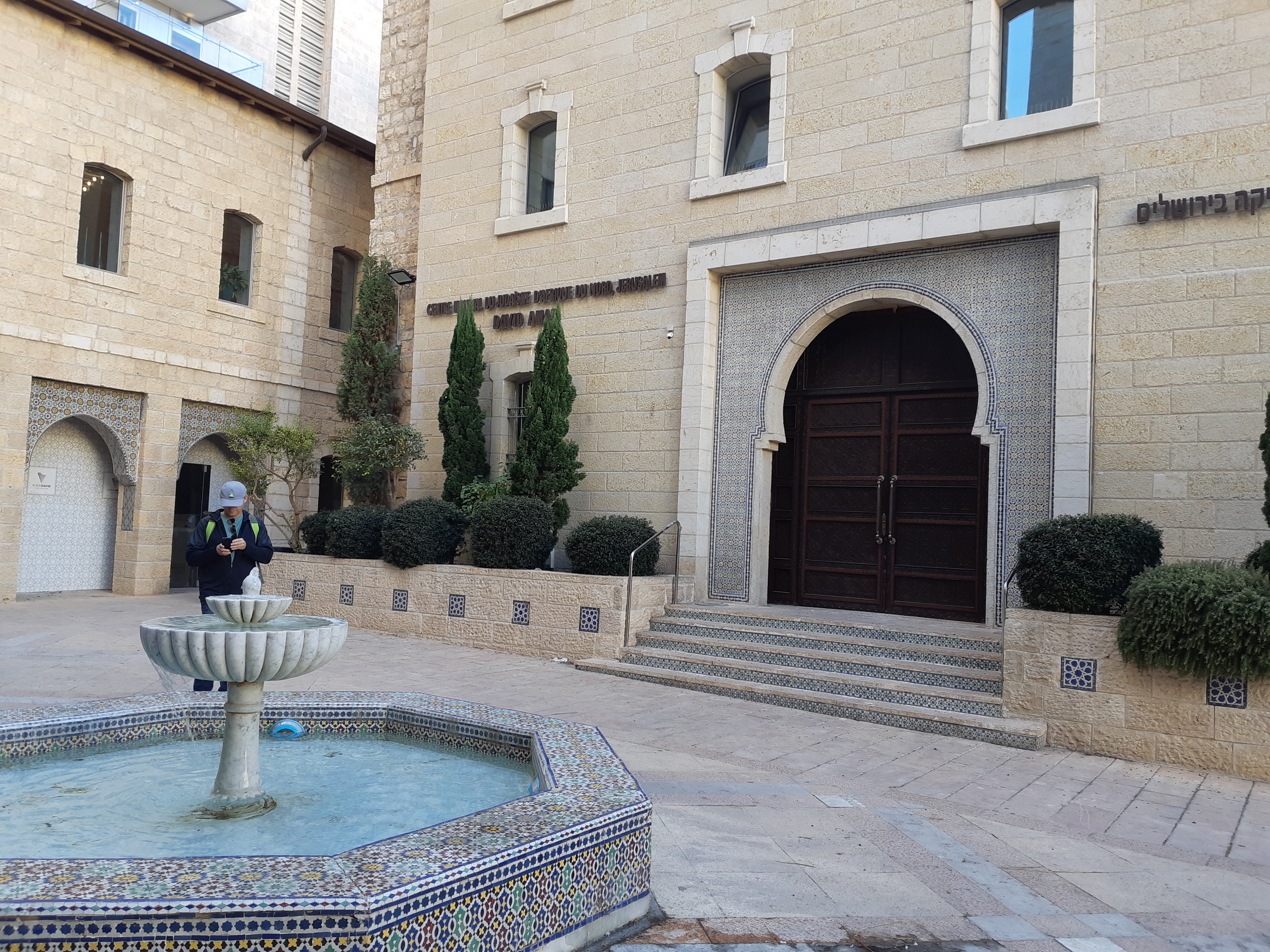
The North African Jewish Heritage Center

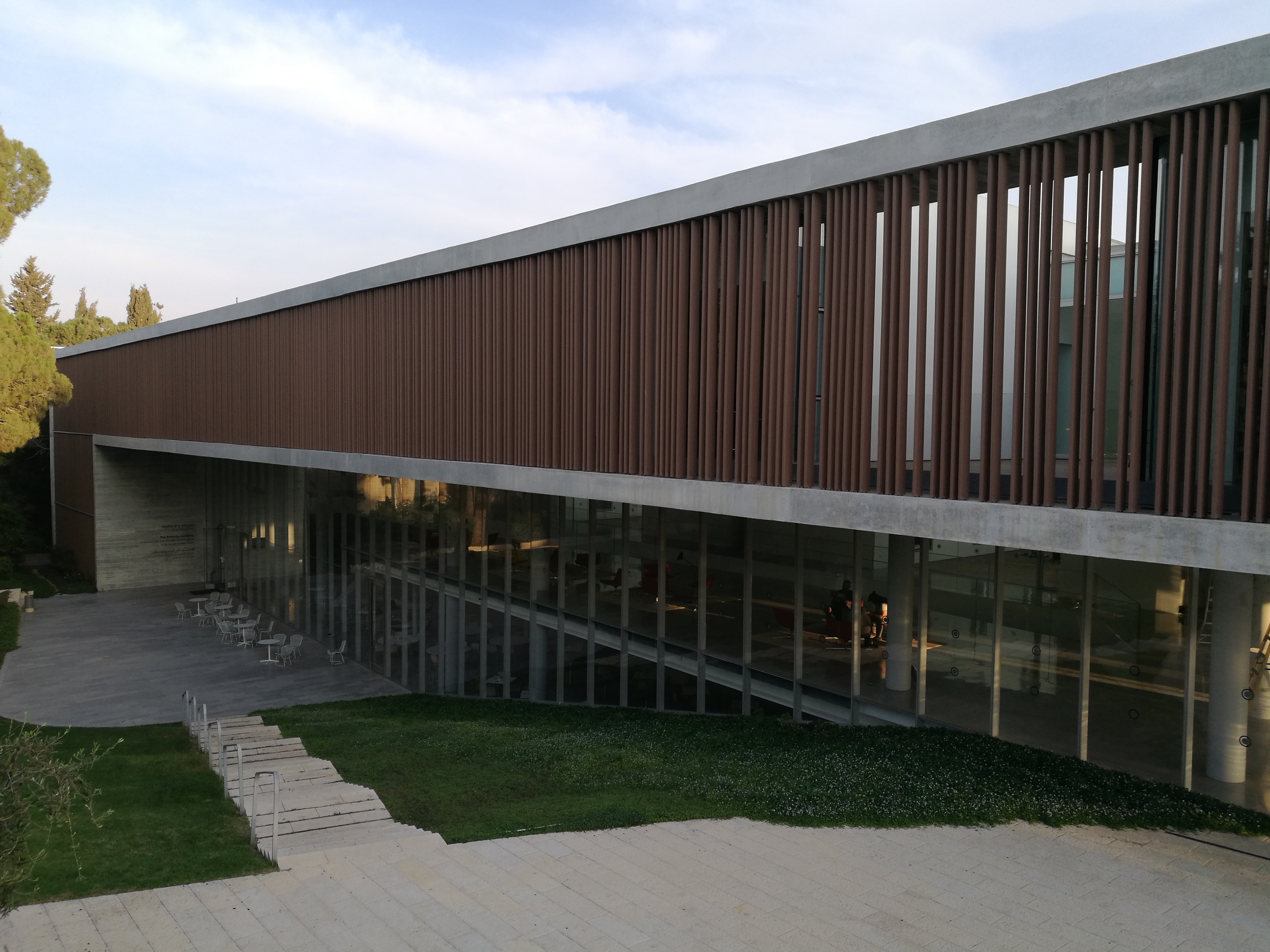
Van Leer Institute

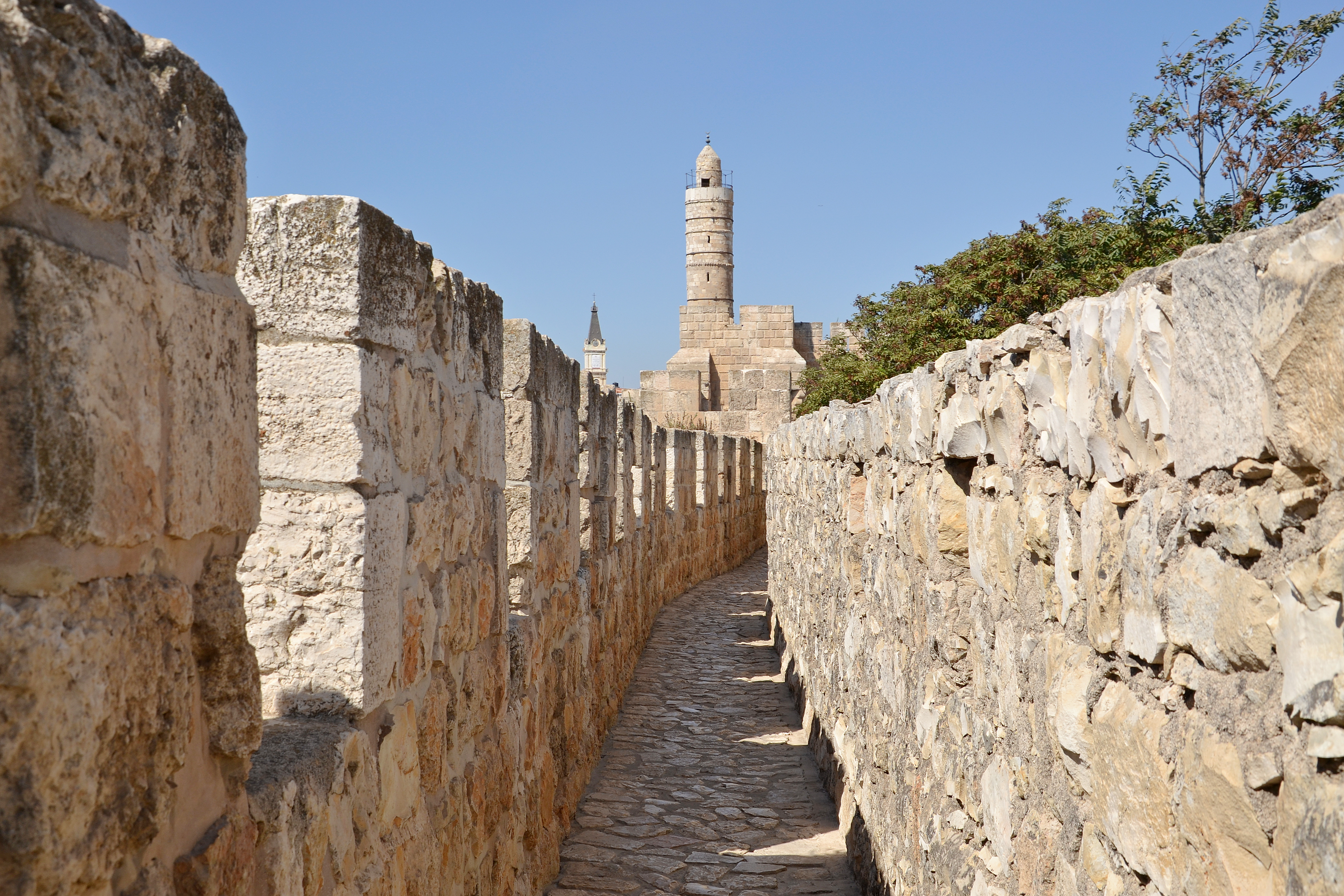
Tower of David Museum

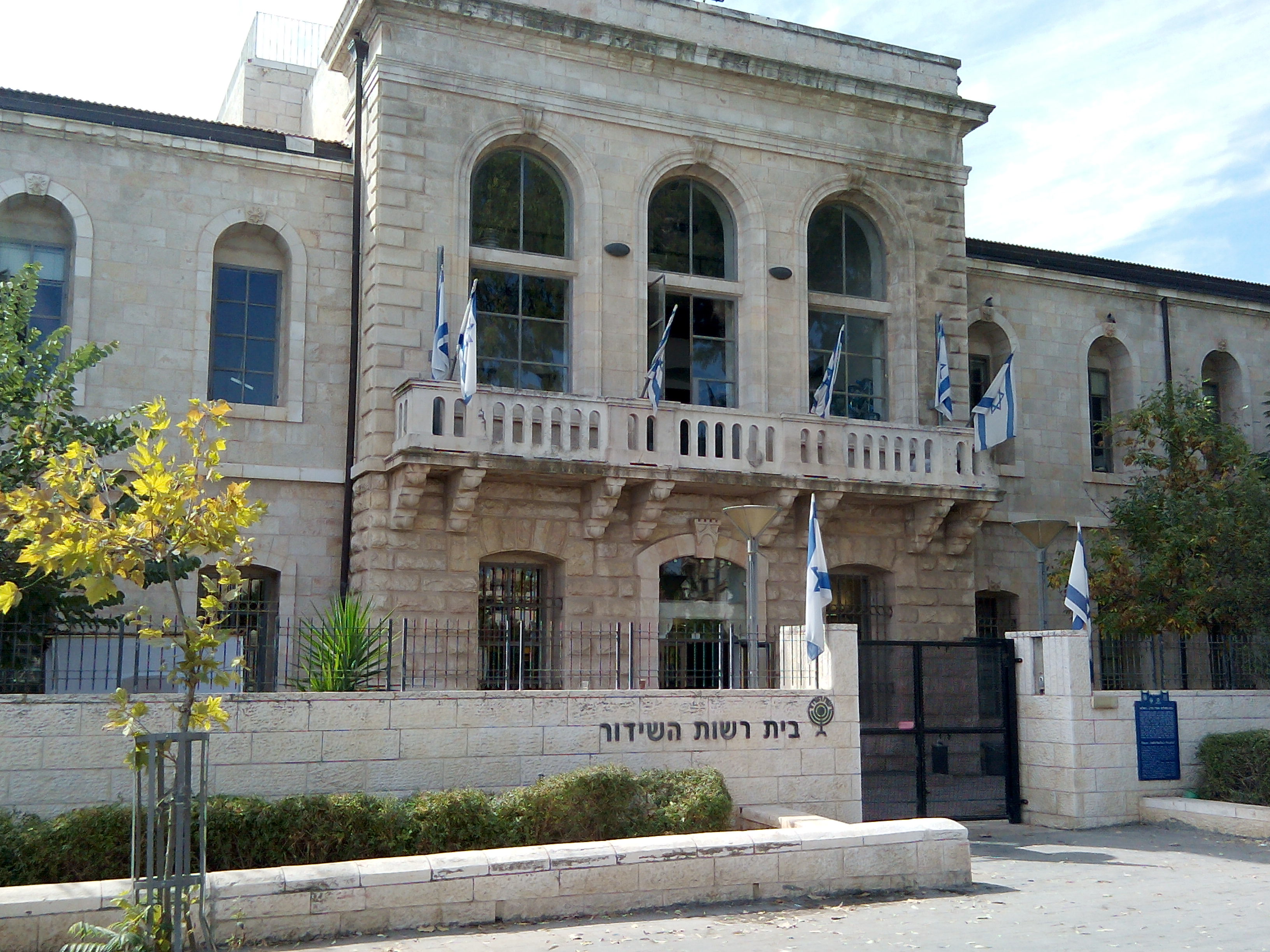
Old Shaarei Tzedek, Jaffa street

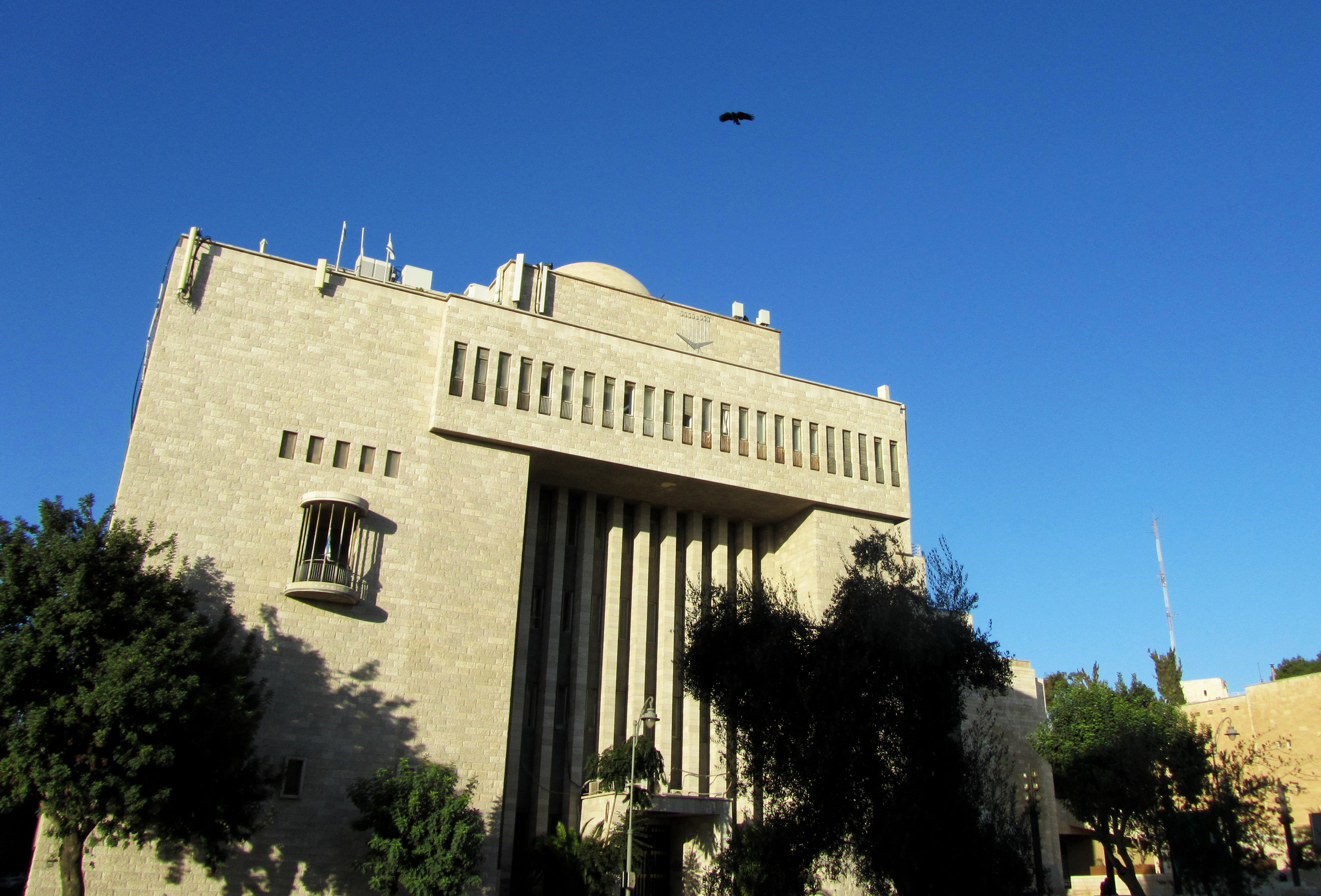
Heichal Shlomo

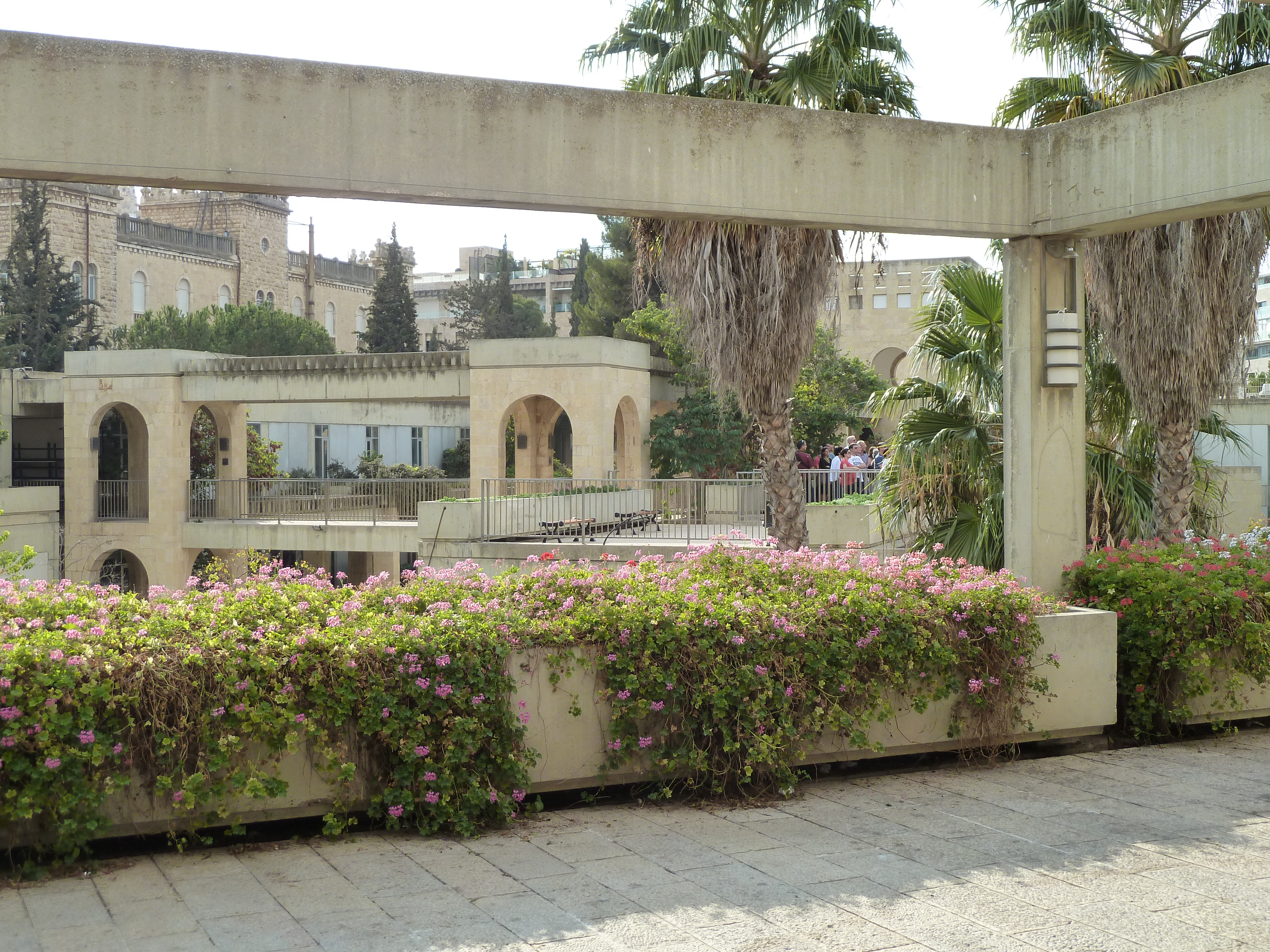
Hebrew Union College Campus

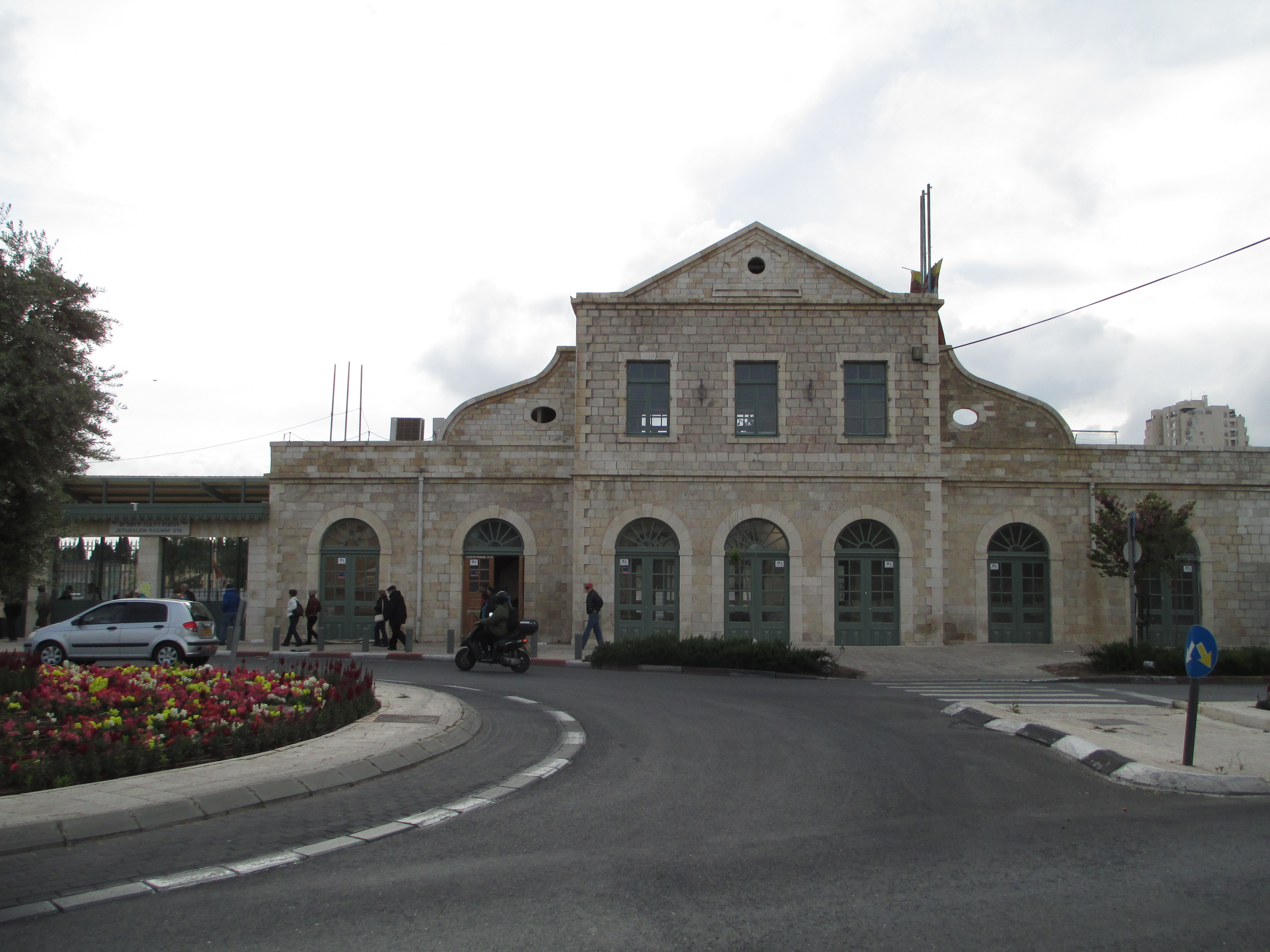
First Railway Station

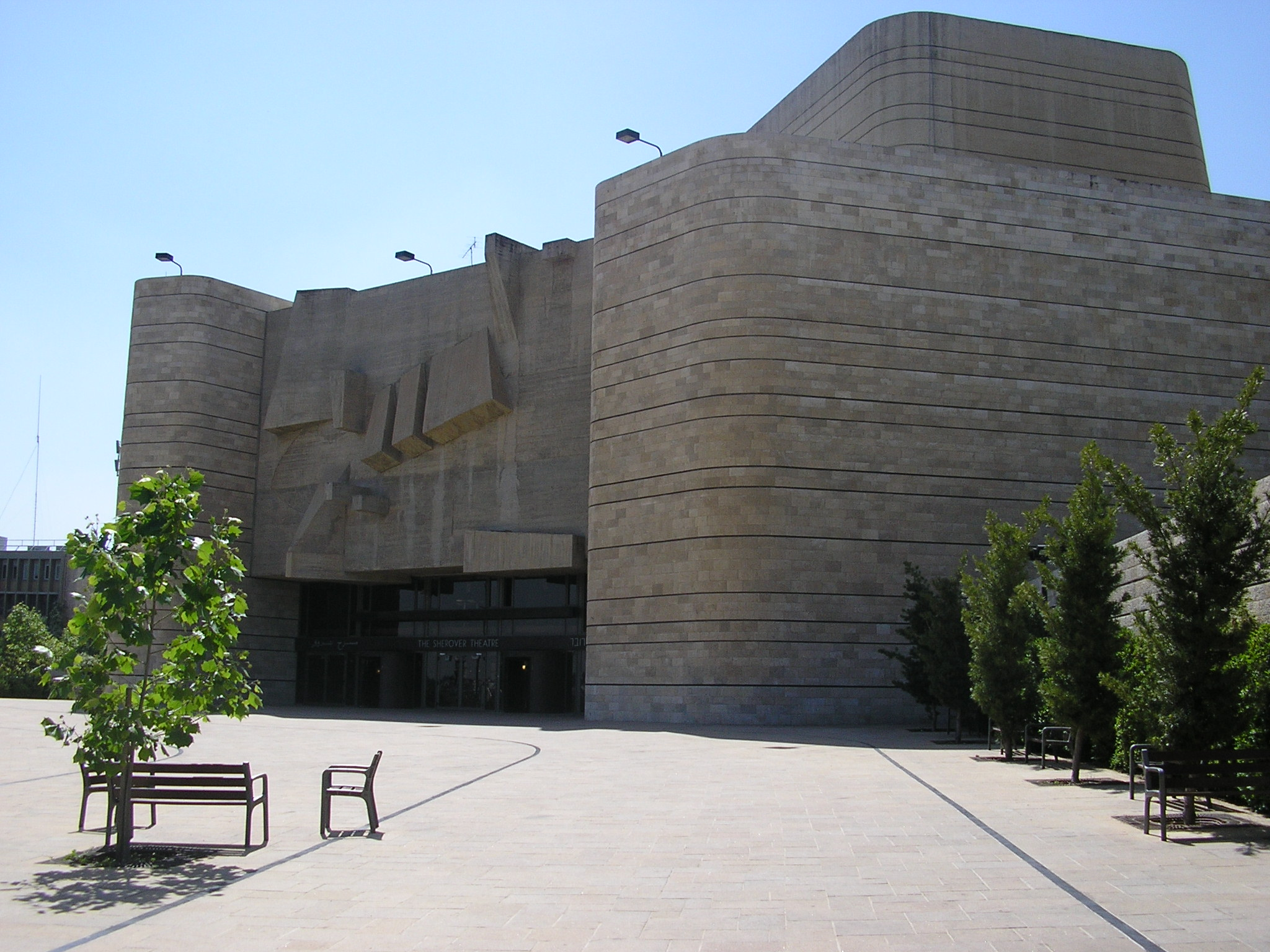
Jerusalem Theatre

== See also ==
- Israeli art
