= 2nd Jerusalem Biennale (2015) =

2015 art biennial in Israel

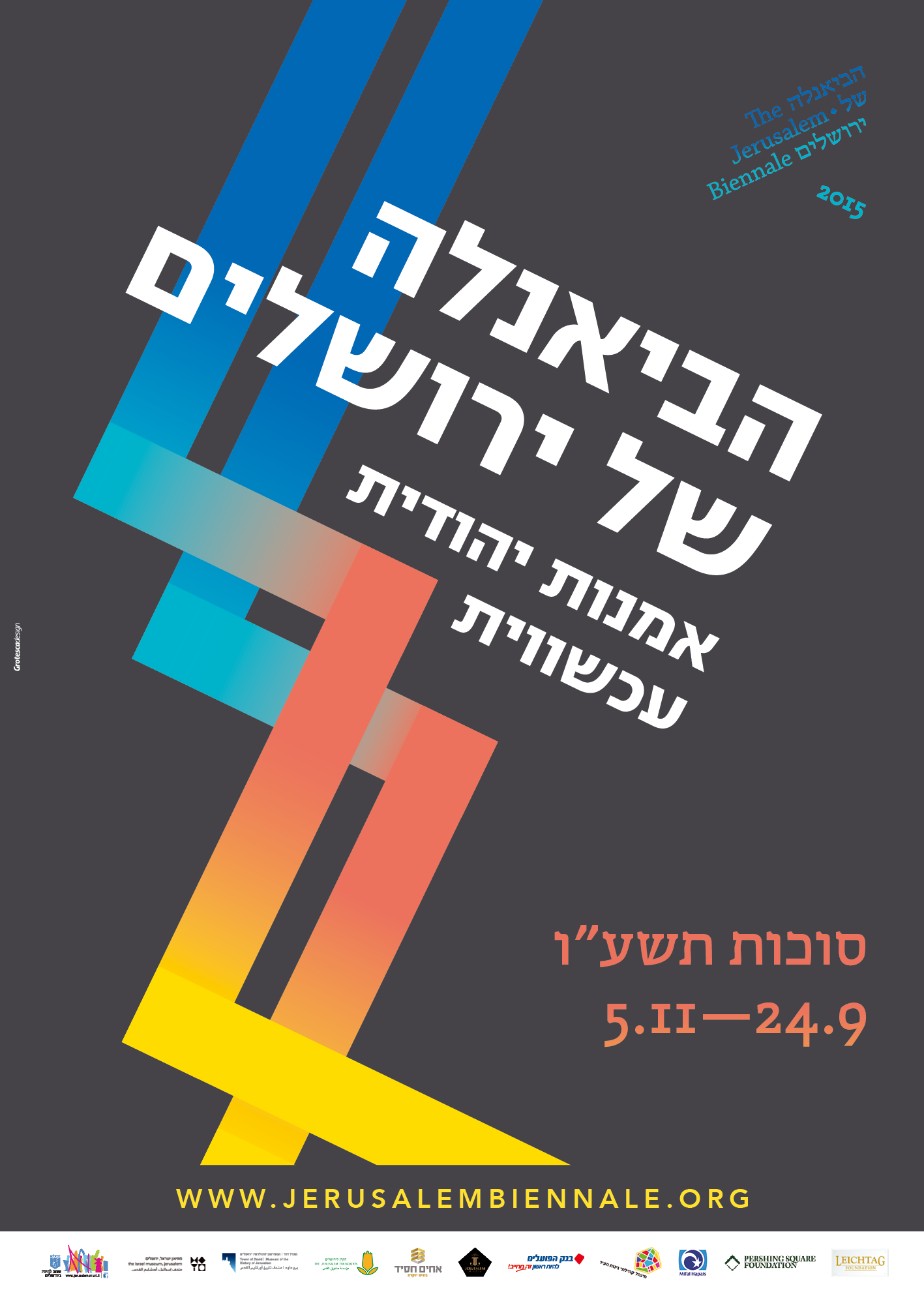
Poster for the 2nd Jerusalem Biennale in 2015

The Jerusalem Biennale, as stated on the Biennial Foundation's website, "is a platform for professional curators and artists to present contemporary works that relate, in one way or another, to the Jewish world of content. Every two years, a growing community of artists, art lovers, collectors, writers, researchers, and social activists gather in Jerusalem to celebrate Contemporary Jewish Art and to enjoy a variety of exhibitions, projects, site-specific installations and events under this conceptual framework."

The second Jerusalem Biennale, titled "Present Work," was held on 24 September to 5 November 2015. More than 200 artists participated in the Biennale, including Motti Mizrachi, Sigalit Landau, Andi Arnovitz, Pablo Lobato, and Maya Zack.

The Biennale was displayed in seven different venues across Jerusalem including the Tower of David Museum, the Van Leer Research Institution, Bible Lands Museum, Hechal Shlomo, the First Station, the Center for North African Jews, Hasid Brothers building, Schechter Institute, Art Shelter Gallery, and Hebrew Union College. In total, as many as 10,000 visitors and organized groups attended and viewed the exhibitions.

The 2015 Jerusalem Biennale was covered by various news outlets such as The Jerusalem Post, Times of Israel, The Jewish Chronicle, The New York Times, and more.
