= Ozeri =

Ozeri is a surname. Notable people with the surname include:

- Adam Ozeri (born 1998), American soccer player
- Ahuva Ozeri (1948–2016), Israeli singer
- Gil Ozeri, American comedian, actor, and writer
- Ram Ozeri (born 1980), Israeli artist and economist
- Yigal Ozeri (born 1958), Israeli artist
- Zion Ozeri (born 1951), Israeli-American photographer
