= 1st Jerusalem Biennale (2013) =

Coordinates: 31°47′14.0238″N 35°12′30.7404″E

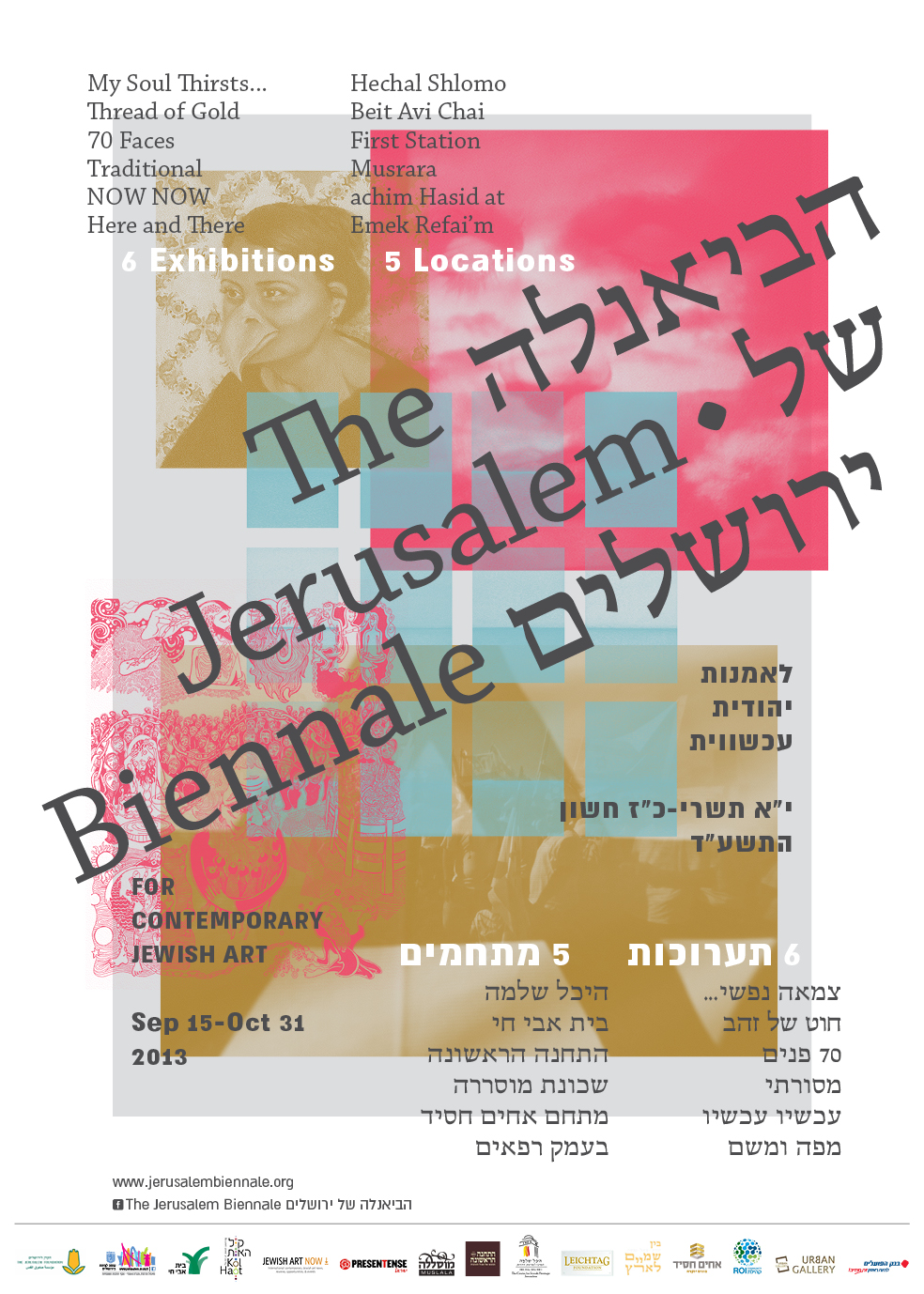
Poster for the 1st Jerusalem Biennale in 2013

The Jerusalem Biennale, is a biennale taking place in Jerusalem, Israel, every odd year since 2013. As stated on the Biennial Foundation's website, "is a platform for professional curators and artists to present contemporary works that relate, in one way or another, to the Jewish world of content. Every two years, a growing community of artists, art lovers, collectors, writers, researchers, and social activists gather in Jerusalem to celebrate Contemporary Jewish Art and to enjoy a variety of exhibitions, projects, site-specific installations and events under this conceptual framework."

The first Jerusalem Biennale, titled "Does it Even Exist," was held on September 15 to October 31, 2013. 59 artists participated in the Biennale, and the art was displayed in 6 different exhibitions around Jerusalem. About 150 artworks were displayed in the exhibition from the participating artists. Participating artists included Andi Arnovitz, Neta Elkayam, Shai Azoulay, Dov Abramson, and Tobi Kahn.

5,000 visitors attended and viewed the exhibitions, along with additional events such as music and dance performances, workshops, and debates. The Biennale was displayed in venues across Jerusalem including Hechal Shlomo, ז עדי Beit Avi Chai, Musrara, and Achim Hasid Co.

It was covered by the Jerusalem Post, Jewish Business News, The Times of Israel, and Haaretz.
