= 3rd Jerusalem Biennale (2017) =

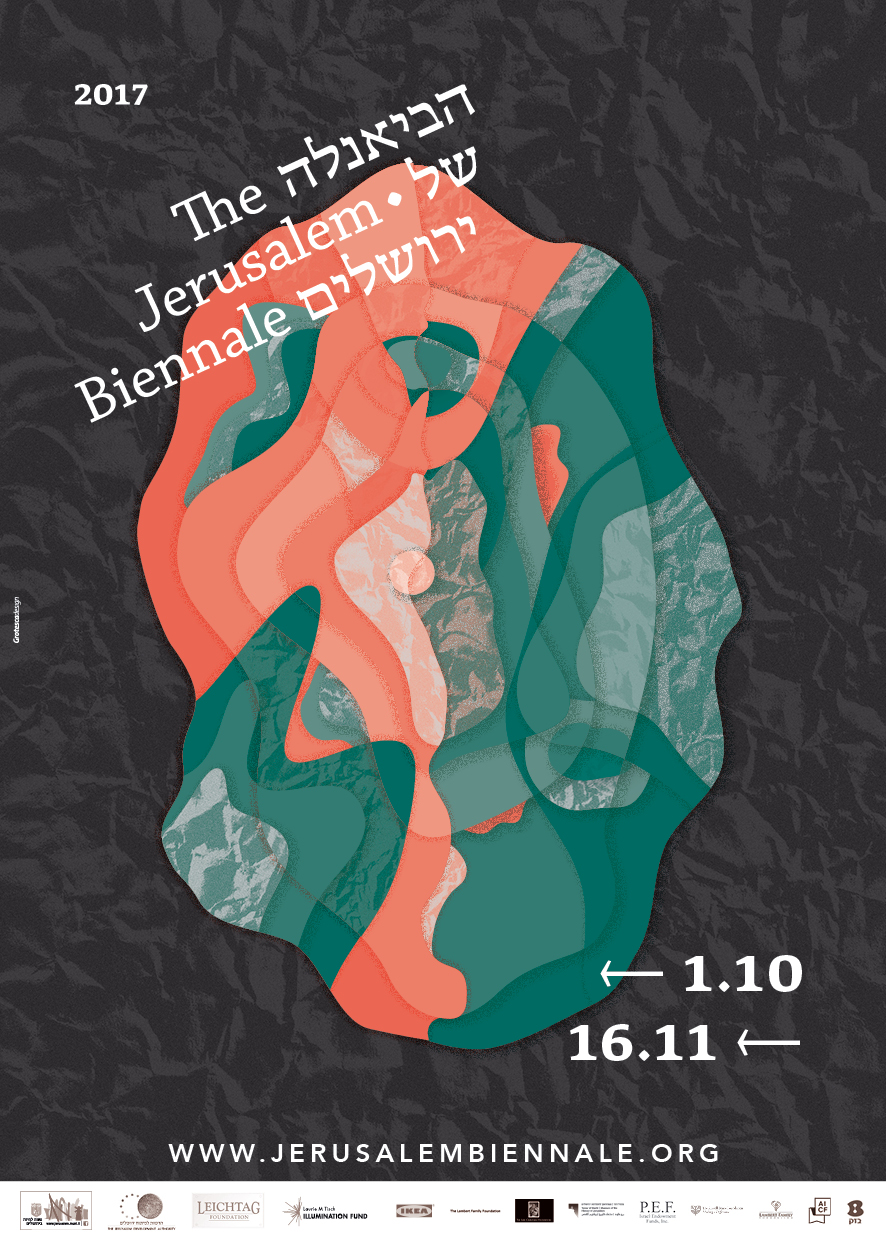
Poster for the 3rd Jerusalem Biennale in 2017

The Jerusalem Biennale, as stated on the Biennial Foundation's website, "is a platform for professional curators and artists to present contemporary works that relate, in one way or another, to the Jewish world of content. Every two years, a growing community of artists, art lovers, collectors, writers, researchers, and social activists gather in Jerusalem to celebrate Contemporary Jewish Art and to enjoy a variety of exhibitions, projects, site-specific installations and events under this conceptual framework."

The 3rd Jerusalem Biennale was held from October 1 to November 16, 2017. The title for this year's Biennale, Watershed, focused on the individual experience and the ways that we are shaped by our experiences. 230 artists contributed their work to Watershed. The number of visitors doubled from the previous Biennale, with 30,000 visitors in attendance.

The Biennale was held in venues across Jerusalem including the Tower of David Museum, The Bible Lands Museum, The Skirball Museum, the Van Leer Research Institute, the Bezeq Building, Hamachtarot Museum, The Austrian Hospice, Beit Hasid, and Beit Rachel-Straus.

Watershed received coverage from news sources such as The Jerusalem Post, The Jewish Press, Time Out Israel, and other news outlets.
