= Avner Sher =

Israeli architect and artist (born 1951)

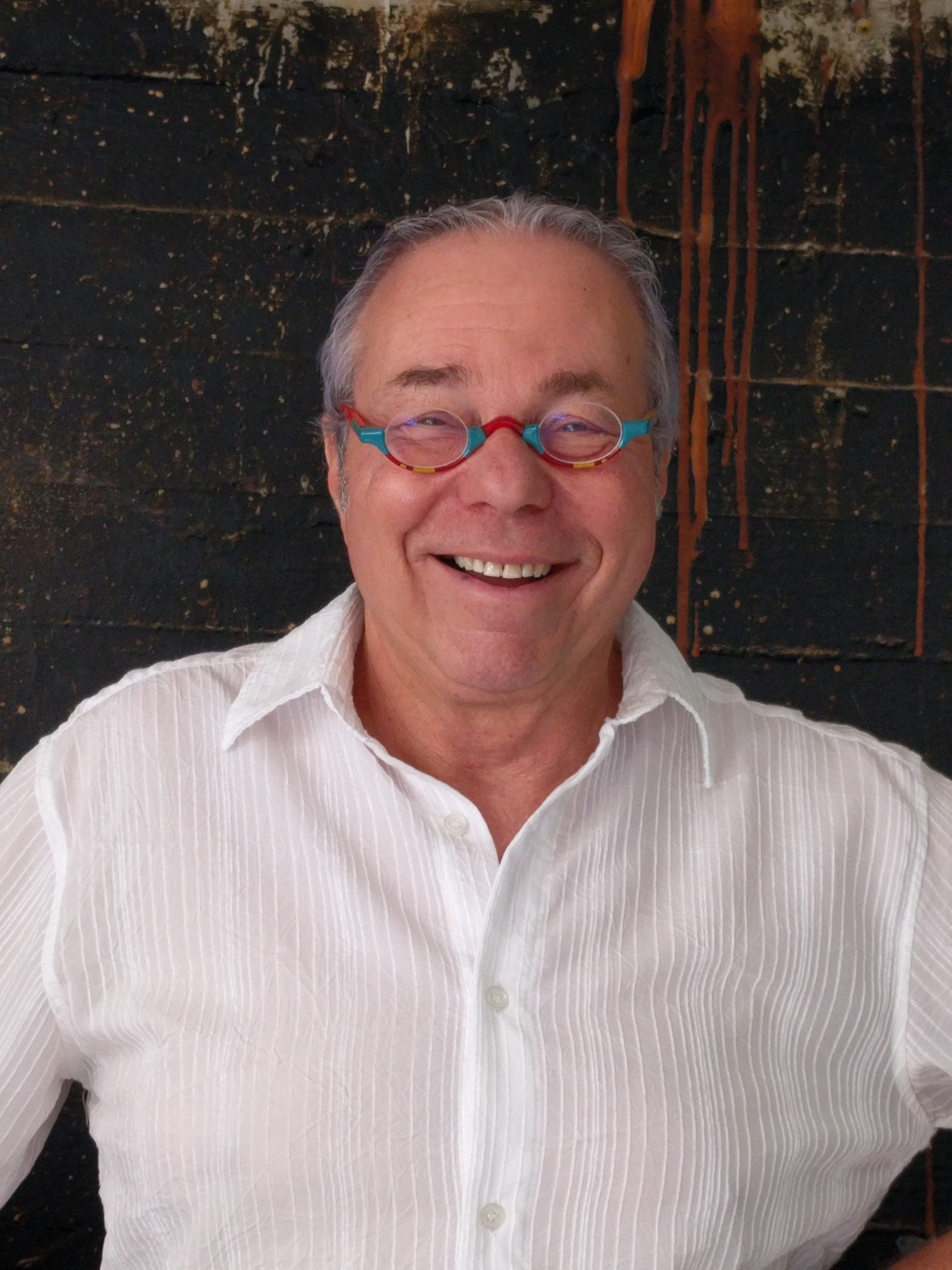
Avner Sher

Avner Sher (Hebrew: אבנר שר; born 1951) is an Israeli architect and artist.

== Biography ==
Avner Sher was born in the Wadi Salib neighborhood of Haifa, and raised in Kiryat Eliezer and Kiryat Eliyahu. His parents were Holocaust survivors. Sher was an only child. His mother died of cancer when he was 14 years old. In elementary school, he drew cartoons for his school newspaper. From the age of 6 he studied piano at Beit Hagefen in Haifa. A rock band he organized with friends performed the opening act for established musicians, among them Zvika Pik. He began composing at 17, but abandoned music at 22 and decided to become a painter.

He enrolled at Bezalel Academy of Art and Design but his father insisted that he learn a profession. He completed his studies in architecture at the Technion in Haifa in 1979, graduating with honors. While working as an architect, Sher also learn arts from the University of Haifa.

== Architecture career ==
Sher opened his architecture firm in 1992. He has designed many shopping centers and malls in Israel, including the malls in Mevasseret Zion, Ramle, Zichron Yaakov, Raanana, Nahariya, Beersheba, Carmiel, Kiryat Bialik, Kiryat Ata, Kfar Saba, Netanya, Yokne’am and Eilat. Other public buildings designed by Sher are the Kiryat Motzkin municipality and the courthouse in the Krayot.

== Art career ==
In 1999, Sher moved to Tel Aviv and had an experience that changed his life: He stopped at a gas station near Beit Yanai and saw that the restroom walls were covered with graffiti. Captivated by the wildness and artistic freedom they conveyed, he felt the urge to tear down barriers in his own work. He began to paint and draw on cork panels mounted on wood, lacerating the surface with knives, screwdrivers and electric saws, burning it with a wood-burning etching pencil and splattering it with substances like coffee, mud, ketchup and red wine. His work is also rooted in the iconography of the Levant. He references ancient visual languages and hieroglyphics while maintaining a universal theme combining prehistoric elements and childlike symbolism. Common motifs in his work are fish, faces, spirals and images of flora and fauna. Sometimes he incorporates Biblical verses, especially from the Book of Genesis and Psalms. As the son of parents who survived Dachau, Sher grew up in the shadow of the Holocaust and the numbers tattooed on their arms. The tattoo thus became a visual code in his work.

His first important show was in 2002 at Mabat Gallery in Tel Aviv in 2002. Since then, he has had over 20 solo exhibits and has taken part in over 30 group exhibits in Israel and around the world. At the Jerusalem Biennale in 2017, Sher presented his installation “950m2 – Alternative Topographies,” which was displayed at the Tower of David Museum overlooking the walls of Jerusalem’s Old City. Composed of two series, “Maps of Jerusalem” and “Spoila,” the installation explores the idea of “perpetually devolving city space.” At the pan-European art biennale Manifesta 12 in Palermo, Italy, Sher’s installation addresses the issue of migration and refugees making “bold, sometimes ironic use of symbols.”

== Selected solo exhibitions ==
- 2018 – Bridge Palermo Jerusalem, Palermo, Italy
- 2017 - 950m2 Alternative Topographies, Tower of David museum, Jerusalem Biennale, Jerusalem
- 2015 – Landmarks, Artists House, Tel Aviv
- 2014 – A Bird on a Wire, Bar David Museum, Kibbutz Bar'am
- 2014 – Jacob’s Dream, New York
- 2014 – The Secret, Jaffa Port
- 2002 – This is His Tattoo, Mabat Gallery, Tel Aviv

== See also ==
- Visual arts in Israel
- List of Israeli visual artists
- Architecture of Israel
