= Ram Ozeri =

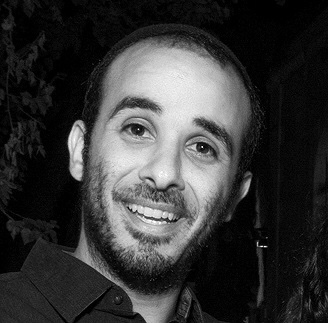
Ram (Rami) Ozeri

Ram (Rami) Ozeri (Hebrew: רם (רמי) עוזרי; born 6 May 1980) is the founder and director of the Jerusalem Biennale. He was born in Jerusalem.

== Educational background ==
Ozeri attended Hebrew University in Jerusalem, earning a Bachelor of Arts degree in philosophy, political science and economics (summa cum laude) as well as a master's degree in economics. After spending a couple of years working as a market economist at Israel's Anti-Trust Authority, he decided to make a change in his life and he signed up for the Fine Arts program at Bezalel Academy of Art and Design.

In his years of studying at the Hebrew University of Jerusalem, Ozeri was the director for the Landa Leadership Program at the university's Dean of Students Office. He was also a teaching assistant in the Economics and Philosophy departments.

Ozeri served for three years in the Israel Defense Forces.

== Career ==
Ozeri was one of seven founders of the art activist group Muslala Art Tracks in Jerusalem.

Ozeri was trained as an economist and worked a few years in the field. Ozeri was a macro economics and markets reporter at TheMarker/Haa'retz. In the years before that, Ozeri was a markets economist for the Israeli Anti-Trust Authority.

As the director of the Jerusalem Biennale, which he founded in 2013, Ozeri combines entrepreneurship, curation, management, production, and writing. He connects contemporary Jewish art content from all over the world, with hosting venues in Jerusalem, and raises the funds needed to produce a high-end Biennale in Jerusalem. Ozeri is also a member of Israel's Ministry of Culture Museum's Council.

== Personal life ==
Ozeri lives with his wife Amy and their four children at the San Simon neighborhood of Jerusalem.

== Publications ==
- Ozeri, Ram. “The 2015 Jerusalem Biennale for Contemporary Jewish Art.” Nashim: A Journal of Jewish Women's Studies & Gender Issues, no. 29, 2015, pp. 142–146. JSTOR, www.jstor.org/stable/10.2979/nashim.29.142.

== General references ==
- https://www.timeout.com/israel/blog/soak-in-the-awe-inspiring-jerusalem-biennale-2017-with-its-founder-ram-ozeri-092617
- https://www.jpost.com/Jewish-World/Jewish-Features/Debut-Jerusalem-festival-aims-to-put-Jewish-art-on-the-map-326965
- https://www.timesofisrael.com/a-watershed-moment-for-artists-at-the-jerusalem-biennale/
- https://www.hadassahmagazine.org/2016/08/12/state-arts-contemporary-art-jerusalem/
