= Zion Ozeri =

Israeli-American photographer

Zion Mansour Ozeri (Hebrew: ציון מנצור עוזרי; born 1951) is an Israeli–American photographer known for his photographs documenting Jewish experience and the Jewish diaspora. Born in Israel to immigrants from Yemen, Ozeri currently lives in New York City.

== Early life and education ==
Ozeri was raised in Israel in the 1950s during a period of mass immigration. He moved to New York City to study at the Fashion Institute of Technology. He then went on to complete his BFA at Pratt Institute.

== Career ==
Ozeri's photographs have appeared in numerous publications, including the New York Times, Newsweek, The Jerusalem Report, Moment, Middle East Insight, and The Economist, and have been exhibited in museums and galleries in the United States and internationally. His published books include The Jewish World Family Haggadah (Simon & Schuster, 2005) and Jews of Yemen, The Last Generation (Keter, 2005). In 2004 Ozeri received the Simon Rockower Award for Excellence in Jewish Journalism. He was a recipient of the 2013 Covenant Award.

The Jewish Lens

In 2004 Ozeri founded The Jewish Lens, a curriculum for middle- and high-school students that teaches Jewish traditions and values through photography.

DiverCity Lens

In 2010 Ozeri created DiverCity Lens. The program encourages students to explore identity and community, and also teaches skills in photography and visual literacy. As of 2020, the DiverCity Lens curriculum is implemented in over 20 New York City public schools.

== Publications ==
Books

- The Jewish World Family Haggadah. New York: Simon & Schuster, 2012. ISBN 978-1596873155.
- The Jews of Yemen, The Last Generation. Jerusalem: Keter, Jerusalem, 2005. ISBN 978-9650713713.
- Operation Exodus: The making of a miracle. New York: UJA Federation, 1995. ASIN B0006QCV82.
- Yemenite Jews: A Photographic Essay. New York: Schocken, 1985. ISBN 978-0805239805.
