= Lynne Avadenka =

American artist

- Known for: printmaker multimedia

Lynne Avadenka is an American artist, specializing in multimedia pieces influenced by the Jewish experience.

Based in Detroit, Avadenka is known as a printmaker and creator of limited edition artist's books. Her works are published through Land Marks Press. Her works have been exhibited in numerous collections, including the Library of Congress, the British Library, the Israel Museum, the New York Public Library, the Detroit Institute of Arts, the Museum Meermanno in the Hague, and Yeshiva University Museum. Avadenka received a Kresge Arts Fellowship in 2009.

Avadenka currently lives in Huntington Woods, Michigan. Over the years, she has received grants from both the National Endowment for the Arts and the Michigan Council for Arts and Cultural Affairs.
