= Shai Azoulay =

Israeli painter (born 1971)

- שי אזולאי
- Born: 1971 (age 54–55); Kiryat Shmona, Israel
- Spouse: Daniella
- Website: www.sazoulay.com

Shai Azoulay (Hebrew: שי אזולאי; born in 1971) is an Israeli painter. Azoulay lives and works in Jerusalem and is a faculty member of the Fine Art Department of The Bezalel Academy of Arts and Design.

== Biography ==
Azoulay was born in 1971 in Kiryat Shmona. His family moved to Arad when he was a child. After his army service, he traveled to the Far East, where he began to paint. He began his art studies at the Bezalel Academy of Arts and Design in the mid-1990s and graduated in 2000 with a BFA degree and in 2007 with an MFA degree.

Azoulay has exhibited both in Israel and worldwide including Tel Aviv Museum of Art (2011), ARATANIURANO Gallery, Tokyo (2013), Herzliya Museum of Contemporary Art (2018), The Israel Museum Jerusalem (2019) as well as group exhibitions in New York, London, Paris, Berlin and Rome. His works are included in public and private collections including The Israel Museum, The Tel Aviv Museum of Art, Ashdod Museum of Art, Bank Hapoalim, Israel Discount Bank, and Bank Leumi.

Azoulay is a faculty member of the Fine Art Department of the Bezalel Academy of Arts and Design (“Oman" Haredi Extension)

Among the awards that he has received are Legacy Heritage Fund Prize for a Young Artist, Tel Aviv Museum of Art, Tel Aviv (2007), The Osnat Mozes Prize for Painting for a Young Artist, The Artists House, Jerusalem (2007), Creative Encouragement Award, Ministry of Culture and Sport (2011), Ministry of Culture Award (2018) and The Israeli Lottery 'Landau Prize' for arts and science (2020)

Azoulay lives and works in Jerusalem. He is married to Daniella Azoualy, a ceramic artist. Together they have six children. His brother is the actor Golan Azoulay.

== Work ==
In their recommendation to reward Azoulay with the prize for a young artist, the members of the Osnat Mozes committee commented that they "...were deeply impressed by Azoulay’s command of painterly skills, his knowledge of the history of painting, and of the contemporary critical discourse." They further noted: "In his paintings, Shai Azoulay moves along a narrow thread stretched between historical narrative and intimate-human stories. With a seemingly gentle and ironic touch he deconstructs modernist and national mythologies, while reconstructing from them refreshing pictures lacking pretension which reveal as if for the first time the possibility of creating a dynamic world.

In her essay for Azoulay's exhibition "Closer to the Sun", Michal Shachani Yacobi states "The relationship between the painting and Hasidism, or between painting and tradition and faith, occupies Azoulay in his works. He uses them to reexamine concepts, rabbinical homilies, and stories borrowed from the worlds of Torah and Jewish mysticism."

Azoulay's has a spanish mother and a moroccan father. When Azoulay was 8 years old, the family moved from Kiryat Shmona to Arad, located in the Negev desert. He later depicted these landscapes in his works. The desert is "so active, but under the surface," he says; it is "working from the quiet."

Upon completion of his requisite three-year army service, Azoulay traveled across Asia, being inspired to become an artist while in Thailand. He went on to attend Bezalel Academy of Arts and Design. Around the time of his graduation with an MFA in 2007, he began to become more religiously observant. Being religiously observant is unusual in the Israeli art scene, of which he is a leading figure.

Azoulay is a follower of the 19th century Jewish mystic, teacher, and storyteller, Rabbi Nachman of Breslov, a key influencer in the development of Breslov Hasidic Judaism.

== Exhibitions ==
=== Select solo exhibitions ===
- Shai Azoulay – Outpost, Jerusalem Artists House, 25 October – 7 December 2003
- Shai Azoulay, Jerusalem Artists House, 13 October – 24 November 2007
- A Whole Heart is a Broken Heart, Sotheby's, Tel Aviv, 17 May –7 June 2012
- Guided Imagery, Inga Gallery of Contemporary Art, Tel Aviv ,20 March – 15 May 2014
- Dos, Inga Gallery of Contemporary Art, 14 April – 21 May 2016
- Shortcuts, Meislin Projects, NY, USA, 10 November 2016 – 27 January 2017
- Shai Azoulay: A Dwelling Down Below, Herzliya Museum of Contemporary Art, Herzliya, 24 February – 3 June 2018
- Shai Azoulay: Kitzur Schulchan Aruch, Inga Gallery of Contemporary Art, 6 September – 2 November 2019

=== Group exhibitions ===
- Group Exhibition, Art Cube, The Artists' Studio, Jerusalem, December 2003
- Lights, Israel Museum, Jerusalem, 2005
- Group Exhibition, Art Cube, The Artists' Studio, Jerusalem, 5–19 May 2006
- The Other Sea, Artists' House, Jerusalem, 21 April- 2 June 2007
- Salame, Graduate Show 007, Bezalel Gallery, Tel Aviv, 31 May- 30 June 2007
- Young Israeli Art: Recipients of the Legacy Fund Prize, Helena Rubinstein Pavilion for Contemporary Art, Tel Aviv Museum of Art, Tel Aviv, 2007
- Mermaid, Inga Gallery of Contemporary Art, Tel Aviv, 17 July- 23 August 2008
- Group Exhibition, Artist Studios, Jerusalem, 11 September - 28 November 2008
- Constellation: Israeli Contemporary Art, Ermanno Tedeschi Gallery, Turin, Italy, 17 February - 24 March 2009
- Women becomes tree, Inga Gallery of Contemporary Art, Tel Aviv, 27 May - 27 June 2009 Artists: Gottlieb Azoulay, Daniella | Azoulay, Shai
- 1 + 1, Art Center - Art Academy, Jerusalem, 5 September- 1 October 2009 Artists: Azoulay, Shai | Gottlieb Azoulay, Daniella
- With this Ring - Wedding Ceremonies in Contemporary Art, Museum of the Jewish People at Beit Hatfutsot, Tel Aviv 25 February - 25 April 2010
- 'Rupture and Repair, Artists' House, Jerusalem, 8 May - 10 July 2010
- Comfort Scapes, Art Cube, The Artists' Studio, Jerusalem, 25 November 2010 - 15 January 2011
- Superpartners, Tel Aviv Museum of Art, Tel Aviv, 8 September - 8 October 2011 Artists: Azoulay, Shai | Israel, Reuven
- New Directions, Mani House, Tel Aviv, Israel, 2011
- Nimrod's Descendants, Artists' House, Jerusalem, 27 October 2011 - 14 January 2012
- Prizes in Art and Design from the Ministry of Science, Culture and Sport, 2011, Petach Tikvah Museum of Art, Petach Tikva, 31 August - 17 November 2012
- Now Now, The Jerusalem Biennale for Contemporary Jewish Art, Jerusalem, 15 September - 31 October 2013
- The Dead or Alive Gallery, City Gallery Kfar Saba, Kfar Saba, 21 November - 25 December 2013
- Mazal U'Bracha- Myth and Superstition in Contemporary Israeli Art, Diaspora Museum, Tel Aviv, 2014
- The Museum Presents Itself 2, Israeli Art from the Museum Collection, Dina and Raphael Recanati Family Foundation Galleries Herta and Paul Amir Building, Tel Aviv Museum of Art, Tel Aviv, 2015
- Akhshav, Stein Rose Fine Art Gallery, NY, USA, 23 April - 3 May 2015
- The Circle of Life, Kunstwerk Carlshütte, Büdelsdorf, Germany, 4 June - 9 October 2016
- Checkers, Rosenbach Contemporary, Jerusalem, 15 September - 30 October 2016 Artists: Gold, Jonathan | Azoulay, Shai
- Repositioning: Old Objects, New Artworks, L.A. Mayer Museum for Islamic Art, Jerusalem, Israel, 2017
- Amba, Inga Gallery of Contemporary Art, Tel Aviv, 1 September - 21 October 2017
- Scenes from Family Life: Works from the collections of Israel Discount Bank and contemporary artists, Eretz Israel Museum, Ramat Aviv, Tel Aviv, 2018
- New in the Collection, Israel Museum, Jerusalem, 3 December 2018 - 23 March 2019
- Group Exhibition, The Judaica Museum, Tel Aviv University, 2019
- 'Naked Soul: Chaïm Soutine and Israeli Art, Mishkan Museum of Art, Kibbutz Ein Harod, 11 September 2019 - 21 March 2020
- Group Exhibition, Ashdod Museum of Art, 2019
- The Artist's Choice, Inga Gallery of Contemporary Art, Tel Aviv, 21 February - 23 March 2019

== Awards and prizes ==
- 2006-2007 Creativity Grant, Bezalel Academy of Arts and Design, Tel Aviv
- 2007 Legacy Heritage Fund Prize for a Young Artist, Tel Aviv Museum of Art, Tel Aviv
- 2007 The Osnat Mozes Prize for Painting for a Young Artist, The Artists House, Jerusalem
- 2008-2010 The Artist Teacher Prize, Ministry of Culture and Sport
- 2010 Artis Grant Recipient
- 2011 Creative Encouragement Award, Ministry of Culture and Sport
- 2018 Ministry of Culture Award
- 2020 The Israeli Lottery 'Landau Prize' for arts and science
- 2020 The Foundation for Independent Artists

== Collections ==
- The Israel Museum, Jerusalem
- Tel Aviv Museum of Art
- Ashdod Museum of Art
- Taguchi Art Collection, Japan
- Salsali Private Museum, Dubai
- Rivka Saker & Uzi Zucker Art Collection
- The Dubi Shiff Art Collection
- Oli Alter Private Collection
- Zila & Giora Yaron Art Collection
- Hagit & Ofer Shapira Collection
- Rose Art Museum, Brandeis University, Waltham, MA
- Matthew Bronfman Private Collection
- Bank Leumi Art Collection
- Israel Discount Bank Art Collection
- Bank Hapoalim Art Collection
