= Andi Arnovitz =

American-Israeli printmaker

Andi Arnovitz אנדי ארנוביץ
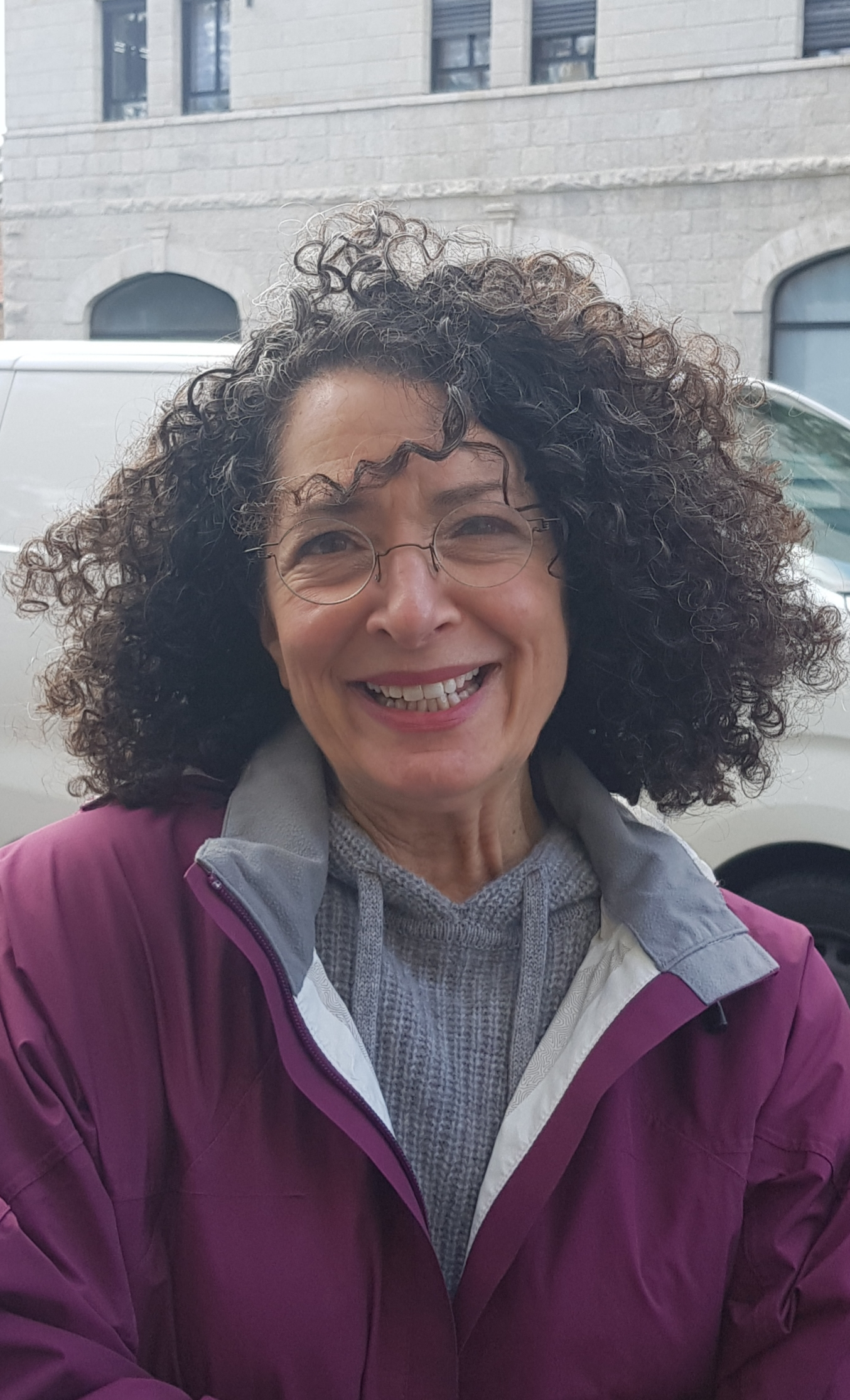
- Born: 1959 (age 66–67); Kansas City, MO
- Education: Washington University in St. Louis

Andi LaVine Arnovitz (Hebrew: אנדי לבין ארנוביץ; born 1959) is an American-Israeli printmaker and multimedia artist.

== Work ==
Arnovitz works in a variety of media, particularly paper. Her work often involves feminism, Jewish themes, or the relationship between Arabs and Jews, and is highly informed by living in the Middle East. She previously worked at the Jerusalem Print Workshop in Israel .

== Biography ==
Arnovitz was born in 1959, in Kansas City, Missouri.

She graduated from Washington University in St. Louis with a Bachelor's in Fine Arts.

She is married to David Arnovitz, and they have five children. In 1999, she and her family moved to Jerusalem, Israel.

== Exhibitions ==
Her work appeared at the Stern Gallery, Shulamit Gallery, and the Jerusalem Biennale.

Her work has appeared in the following museums:

1. The Jewish Museum Berlin, Germany
2. The Haifa Museum of Art, Israel
3. The Hermann Struck Museum, Haifa
4. The Eretz Israel Museum, Tel Aviv, Israel
5. Hebrew Union College Dr. Bernard Heller Museum NYC
6. The Museum of Biblical Art NYC
7. Yeshiva University Museum NYC
8. The Museum of Art, Ein Harod, Israel

Her work is in the permanent collections of the United States Library of Congress, the Israel National library. Yale University Library, The Magnes Collection and Yeshiva University Museum The Smithsonian Museum, The Museum of the Diaspora, Tel Aviv.
