= Motti Mizrachi =

Israeli multimedia artist (born 1946)

- מוטי מזרחי
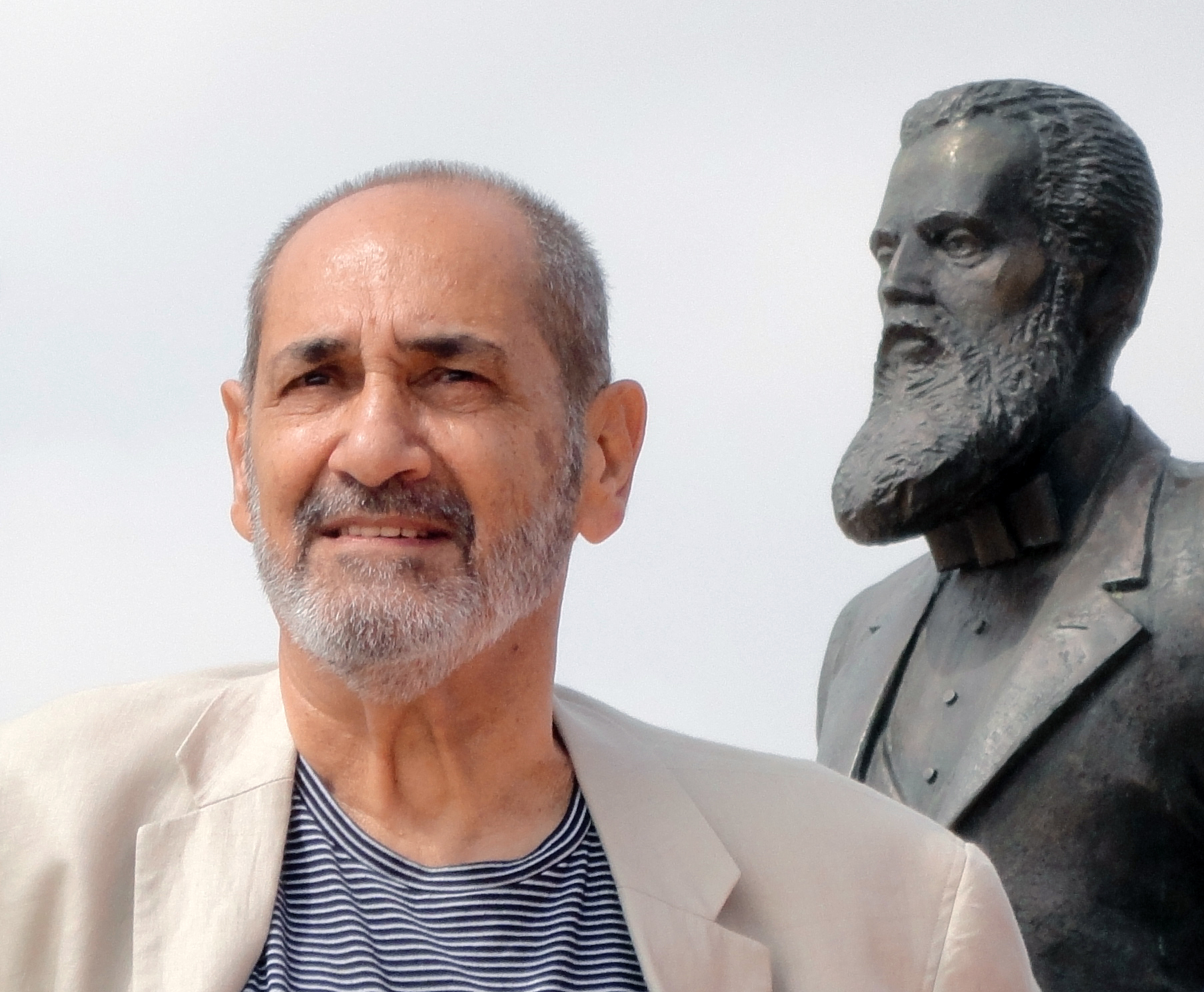
- Motti Mizrachi (2012)
- Born: Mordechai Mizrachi; 1946 (age 79–80); Tel Aviv, Mandatory Palestine
- Education: Bezalel Academy of Art and Design
- Known for: sculpture, multimedia
- Notable work: Via Dolorosa (1973), The Eye of the Sun (2012)
- Movement: Israeli art
- Website: mottimizrachi.com

Mordechai (Motti) Mizrachi (Hebrew: מוטי מזרחי; born 1946) is an Israeli multimedia artist who creates politically engaged conceptual works that combine sculpture, video, photography, public art, and performance. Dough, Via Dolorosa (1973) and Healing (1980) marked the emergence of avant-garde Israeli performance and video art. Since the 1980s, he has created numerous site specific public sculptures.

== Biography ==
Disabled since childhood, Motti Mizrachi uses humor and self-irony in his work, with an emphasis on the flaws and pleasures of the human body, while examining the oppression and control of the strong over the weak, both socially and politically. In 1969-1973, he studied at Bezalel Academy of Arts and Design in Jerusalem. He was represented in the 1980 Biennale de Paris, the 1987 and 1981 São Paulo Art Biennials, the 1988 Venice Biennale, and the 2003 Valencia Biennale.

Mizrachi lives in Tel Aviv, Israel.

== Teaching ==
- 1980-1987 Bezalel, Jerusalem
- College of Art, School of Art Teachers, Ramat Hasharon
- Camera Obscura, Tel Aviv

== Awards and recognition ==
- 1976 - Beatrice S. Kolliner Award for a Young Israeli Artist, Israel Museum, Jerusalem
- 1987 - Israeli Artist Award, Tel Aviv Museum and Bank Discount
- 1987 - Sandberg Prize for Israeli Art, Israel Museum, Jerusalem
- 1987 - Award, America-Israel Cultural Foundation
- 1997 - Prize to encourage creativity, Ministry of Education and Culture
- 2001 - Dan Sandel and Sandel Family Foundation Sculpture Award, Shoe Sculpture, Tel Aviv Museum of Art
- 2002 - Award, Israel Ministry of Science, Culture and Sport

== Public Art ==
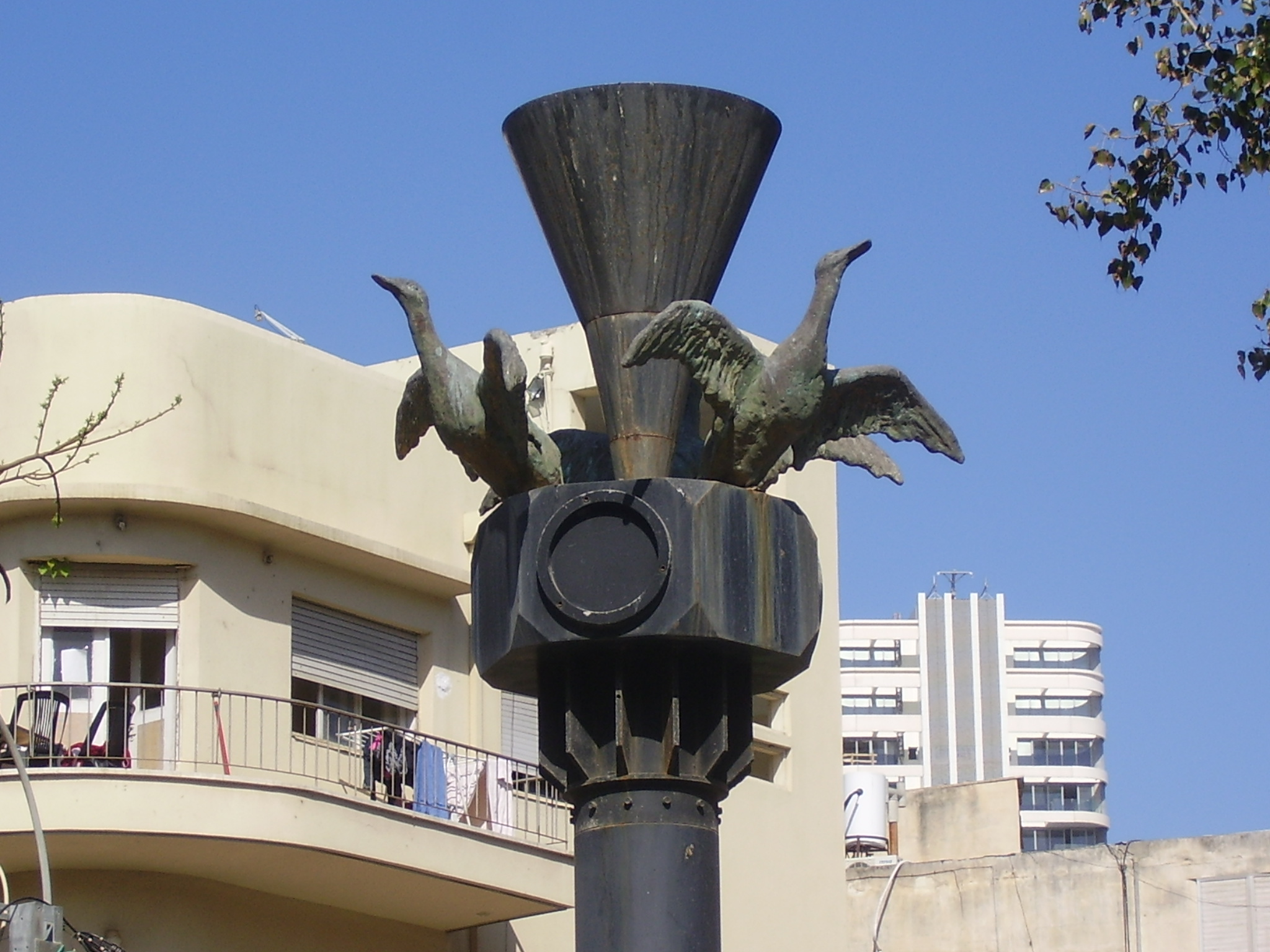
Pillar, screw and ducks, 1989
Steel, bronze and stainless steel
2 Masaryk Square, Tel Aviv-Yafo

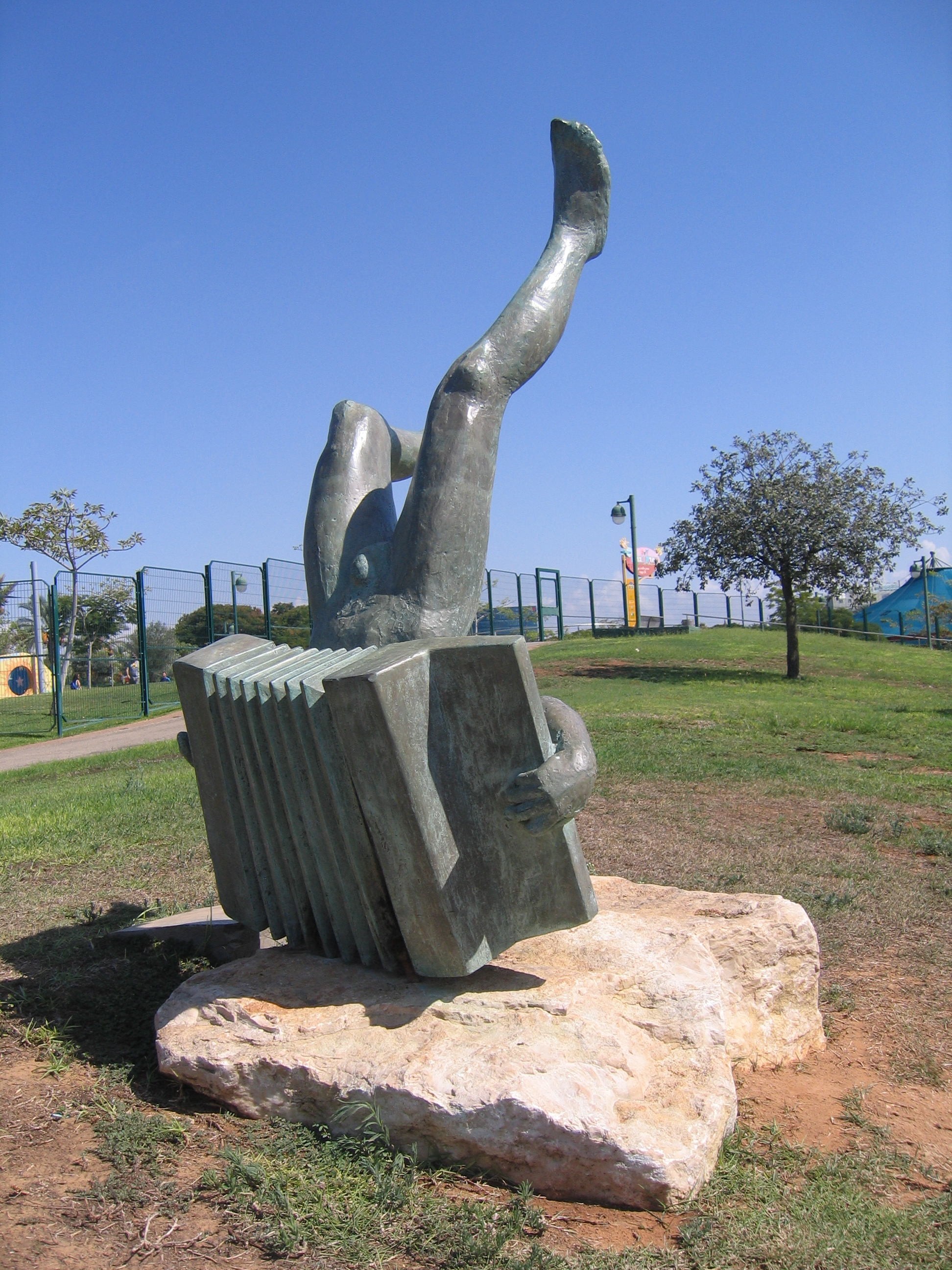
The Fall of the Muses, 1991
Bronze
Ra'anana Park

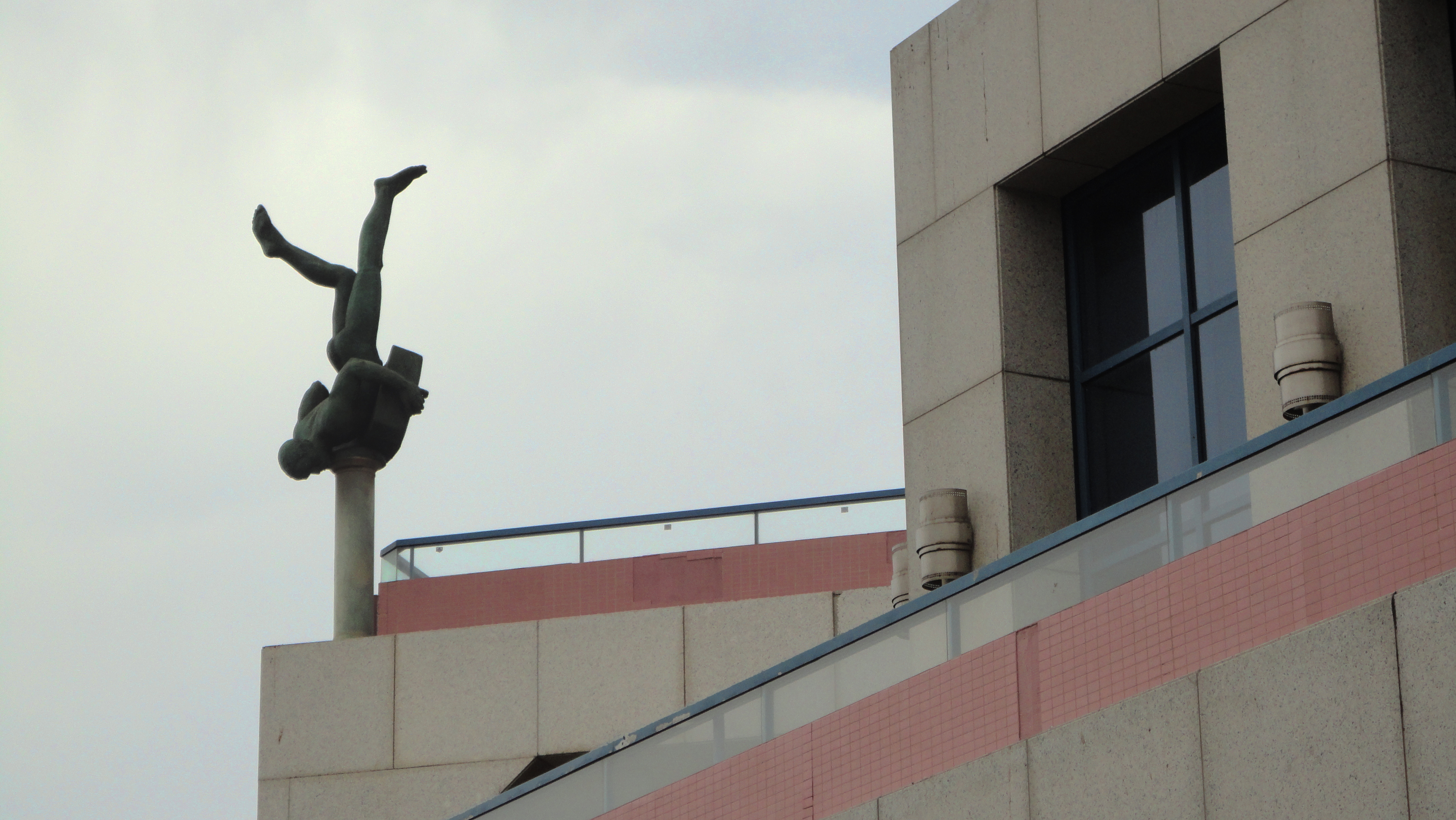
The Fall of the Muses, 1991
Bronze
Ra'anana Park

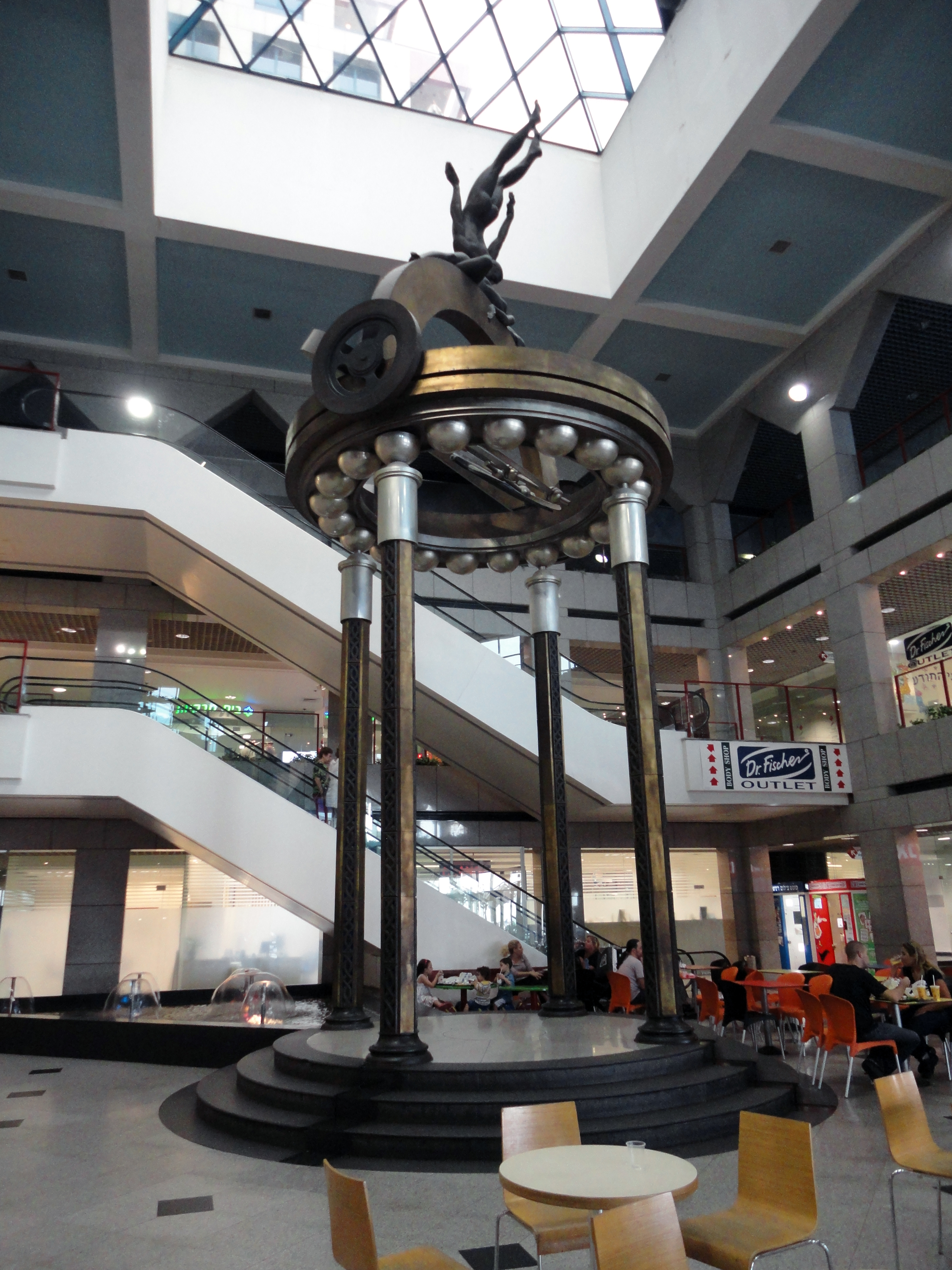
Eastern Kiss, 1991
Mixed media
Opera Tower, Tel Aviv-Yafo

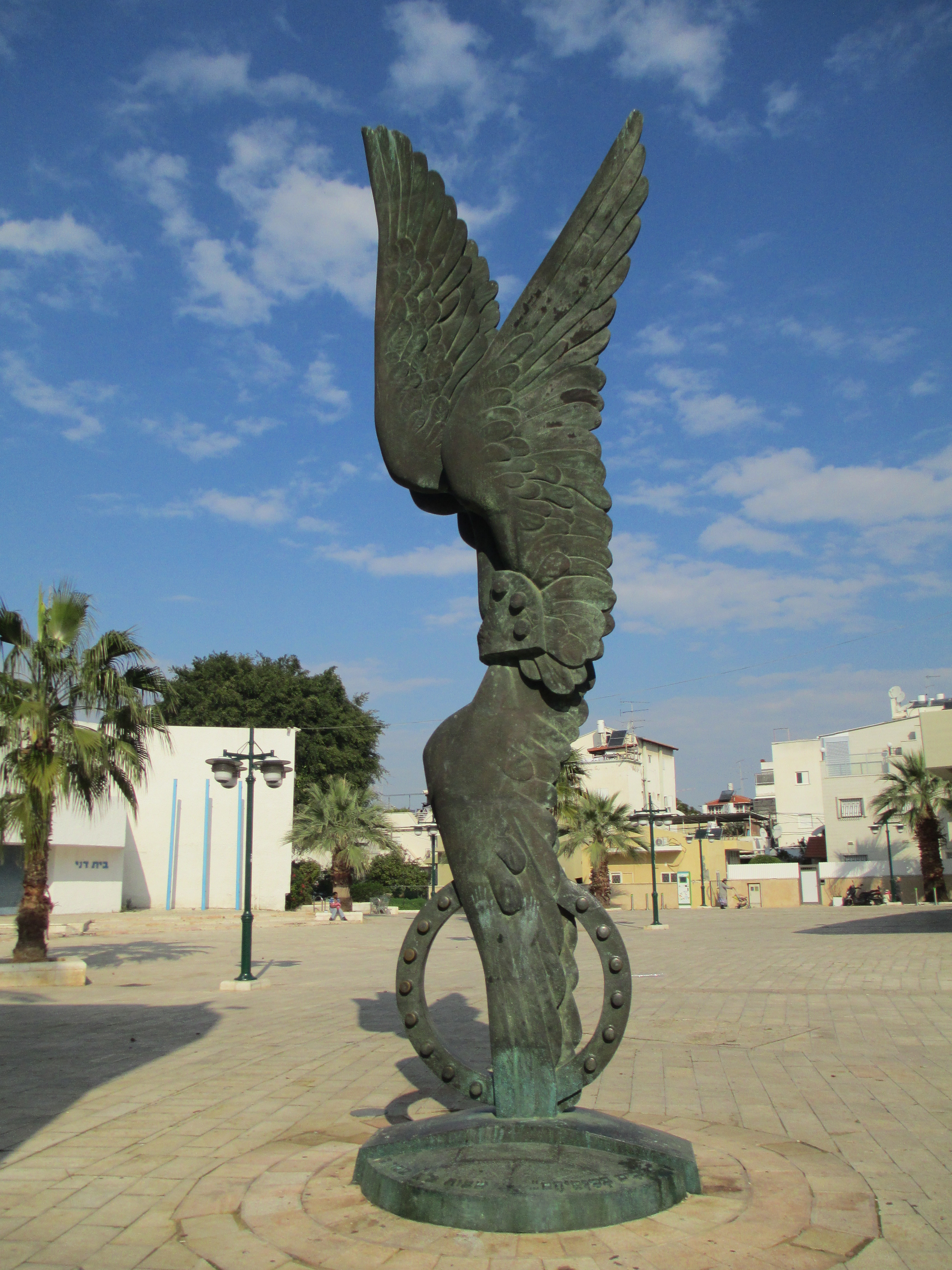
Angel of Peace, 1992
Bronze
Hatikva, Tel Aviv-Yafo

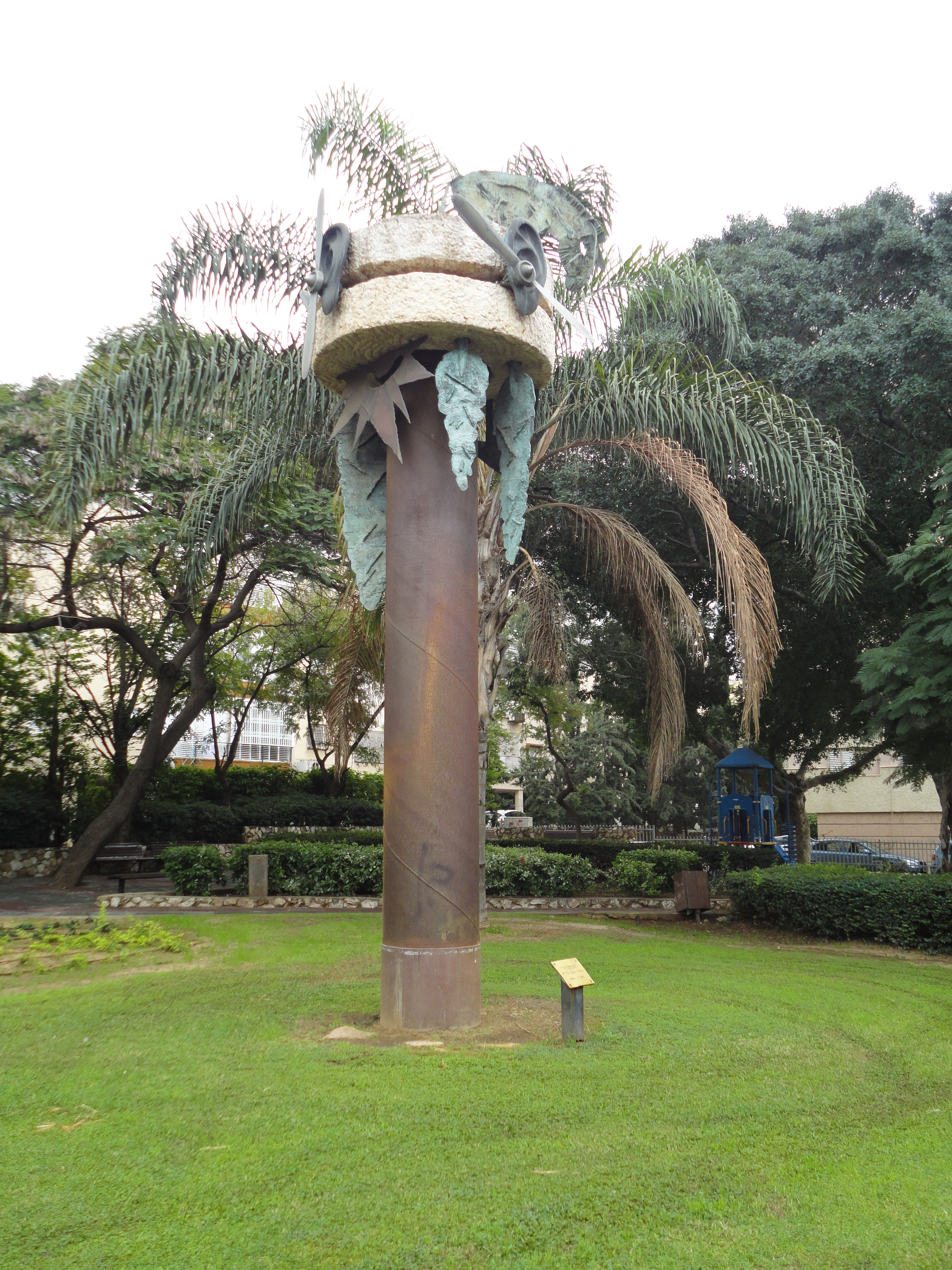
Sprinkler, 1996
Holon

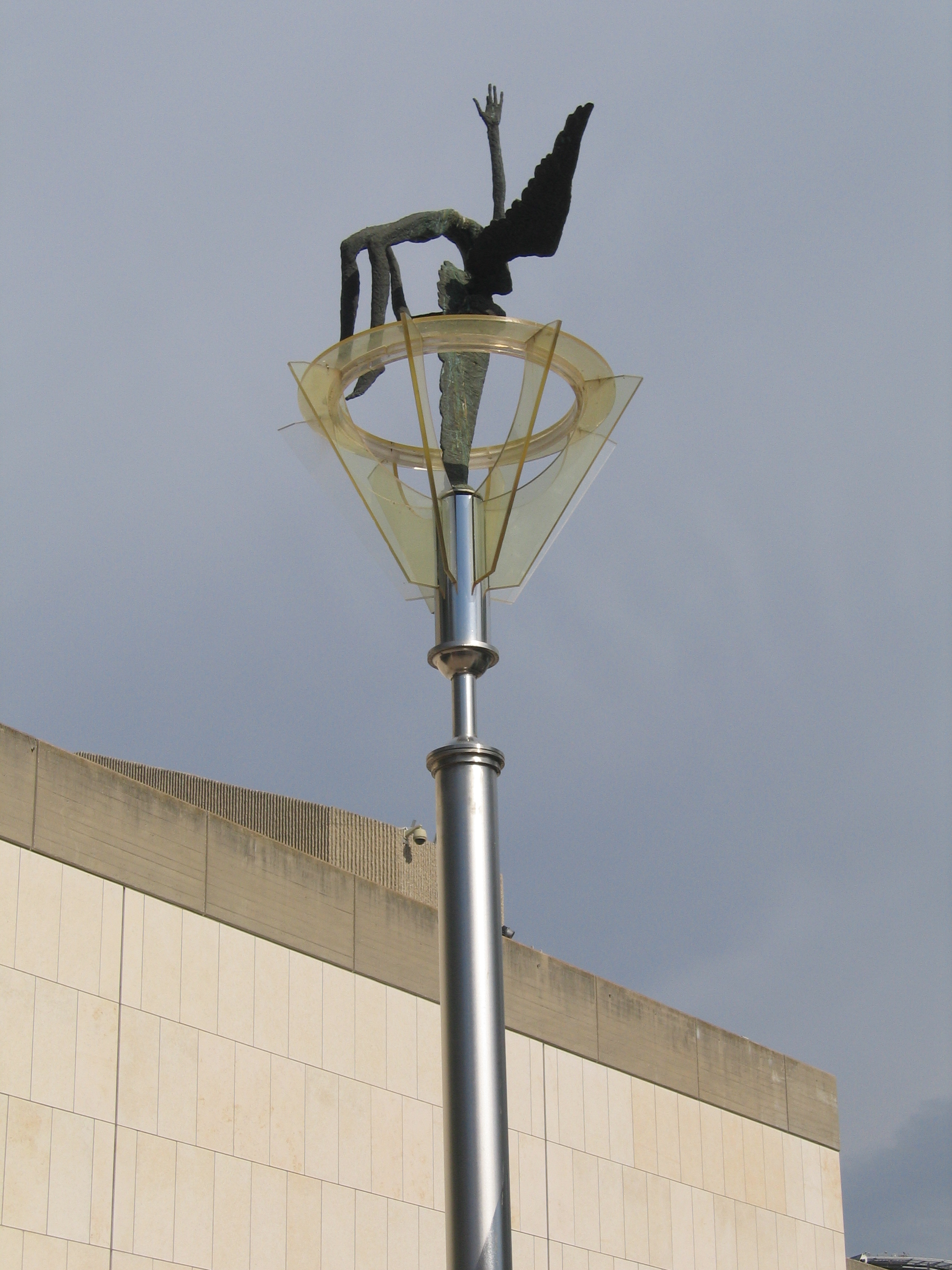
Icarus, 2002
Stainless-steel, plexiglass and bronze, height 750 cm
Tel Aviv Museum of Art

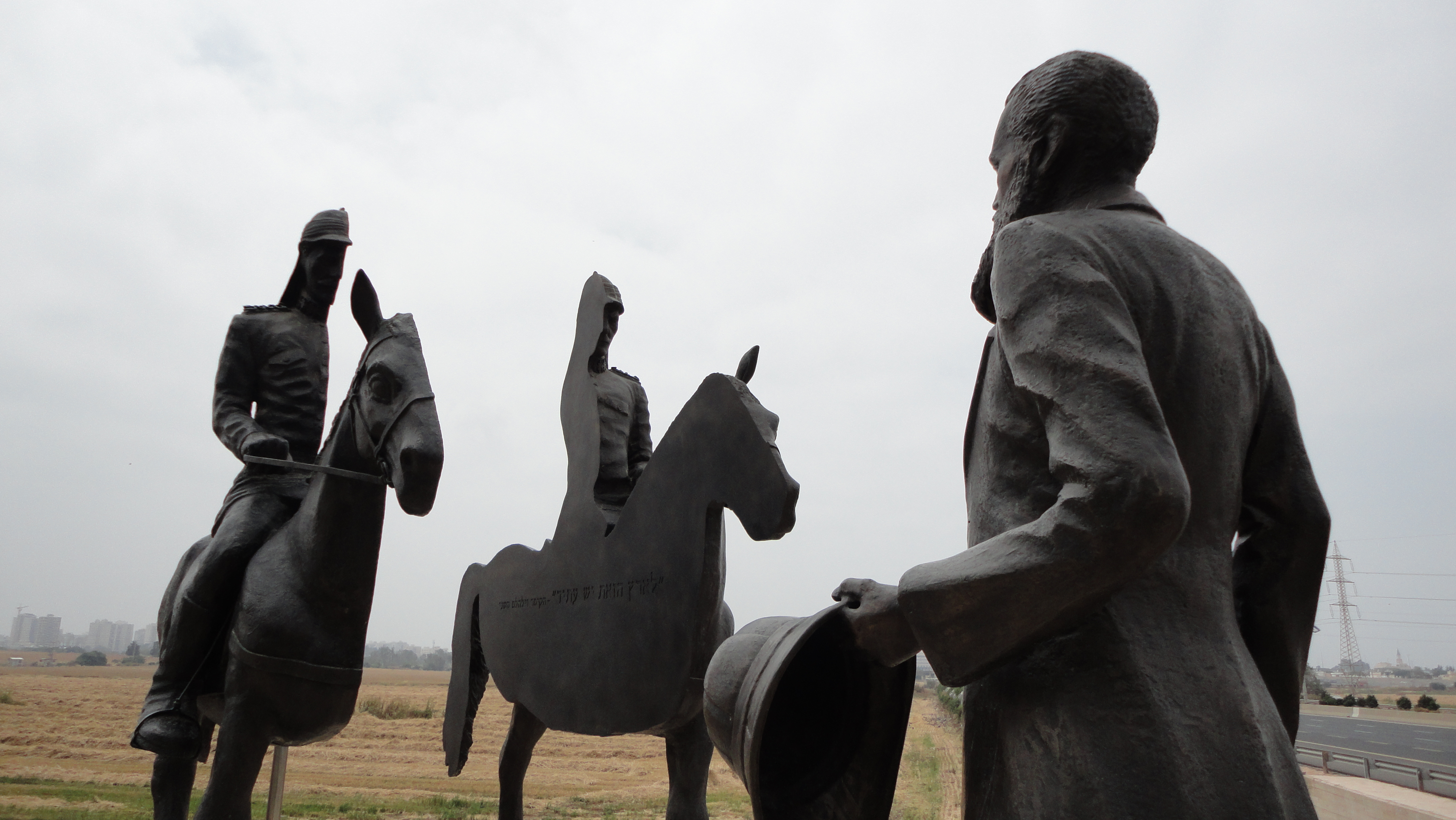
Herzl meets the Emperor of Germany, 2011
Bronze
Mikve Israel

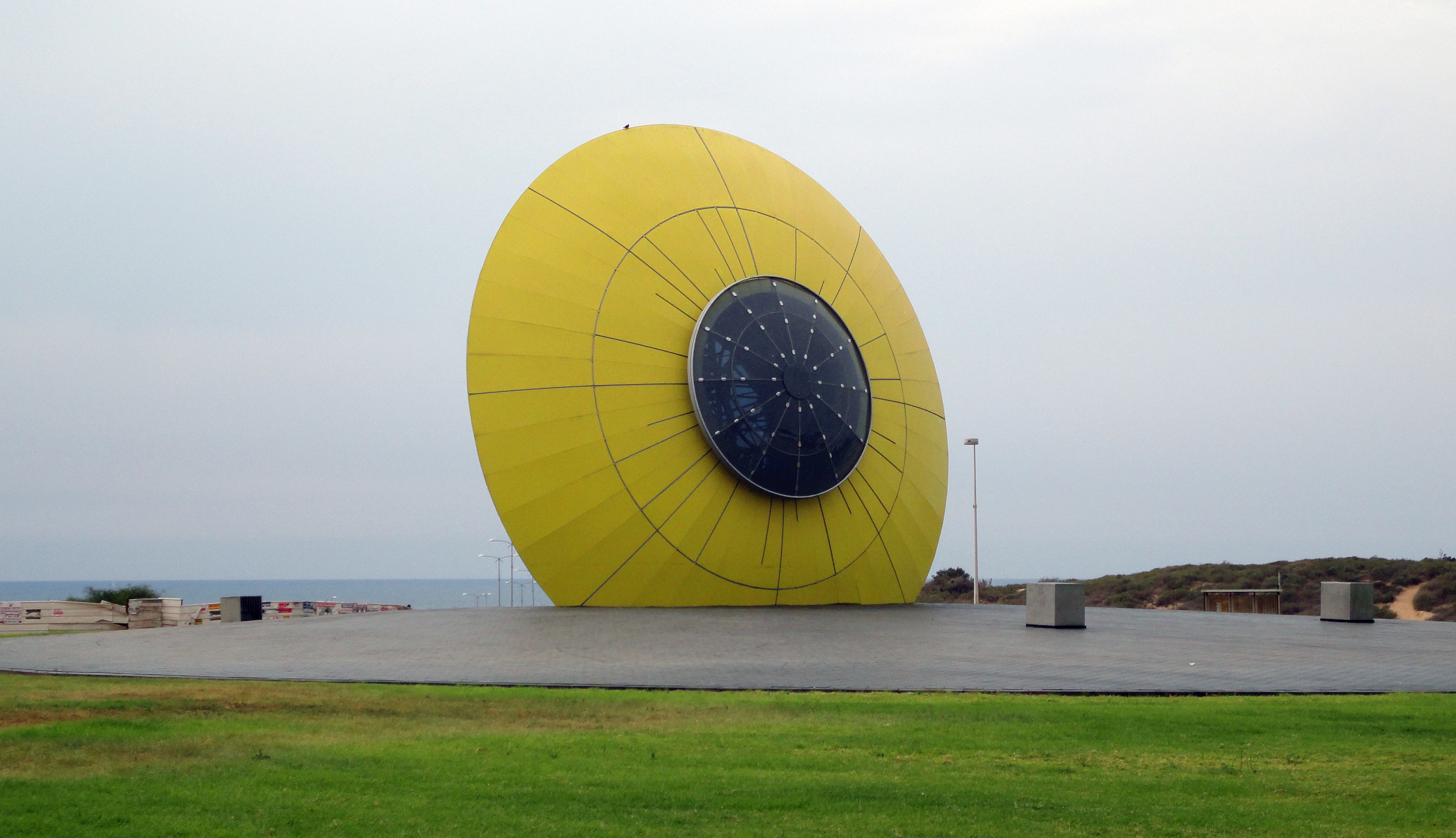
The Eye of the Sun, 2007-2012
Mixed media
Tu District, Ashdod

== See also ==
- Visual arts in Israel
