= Moshe Zabari =

Israeli artist (1935–2025)

Moshe Zabari (Hebrew: משה זבארי; 1935–2025) was an Israeli artist known for his silver Judaica.

== Life and career ==
Zabari was born in Jerusalem in 1935. He studied under Ludwig Yehuda Wolpert and David Gumbel at the Bezalel Academy of Arts and Design in Jerusalem.

He was artist-in-residence for almost three decades at New York's Jewish Museum. He returned to his native Israel in the 1980s. He was known for his modernist approach, a reviewer described his 1998 sculpture, "Death by Stoning," as "elegant and beautiful," despite describing a "terrible act of violence."

In 1990 he was awarded the Jesselson Prize for Contemporary Judaica Design.

In 2015 Zabari was honoured with a Retrospective at the Jerusalem Biennale.

Zabari died in 2025.

== Museum exhibitions ==
- Homecoming to the Holy Land: New Works by Moshe Zabari, Berman Museum of Art at Ursinus College, 1999.
- Homecoming to the Holy Land: New Work by Moshe Zabari, Skirball Museum, 1998.
