= Moresche =

Moresche may refer to:

- Moresche (music), 15th-16th century polyphonic musical genre based on Africans in Italy
- Moresche (footballer, born 1971), full name Alessandro Moresche Rodríguez, Brazilian football striker
- Moresche (footballer, born 1998), full name Matheus Celestino Moresche Rodrigues, Brazilian football forward

== See also ==
- Moreschi
- Moresca
