= Ludwig Yehuda Wolpert =

Israeli-American goldsmith and designer

Ludwig Yehuda Wolpert (Hebrew: לודוויג יהודה וולפרט) (Yehuda Wolpert; 7 October 1900 – 6 November 1981) was an Israeli-American goldsmith and designer, born in Germany. He is celebrated as the first artist to design Judaica in modern styles.

== Biography ==
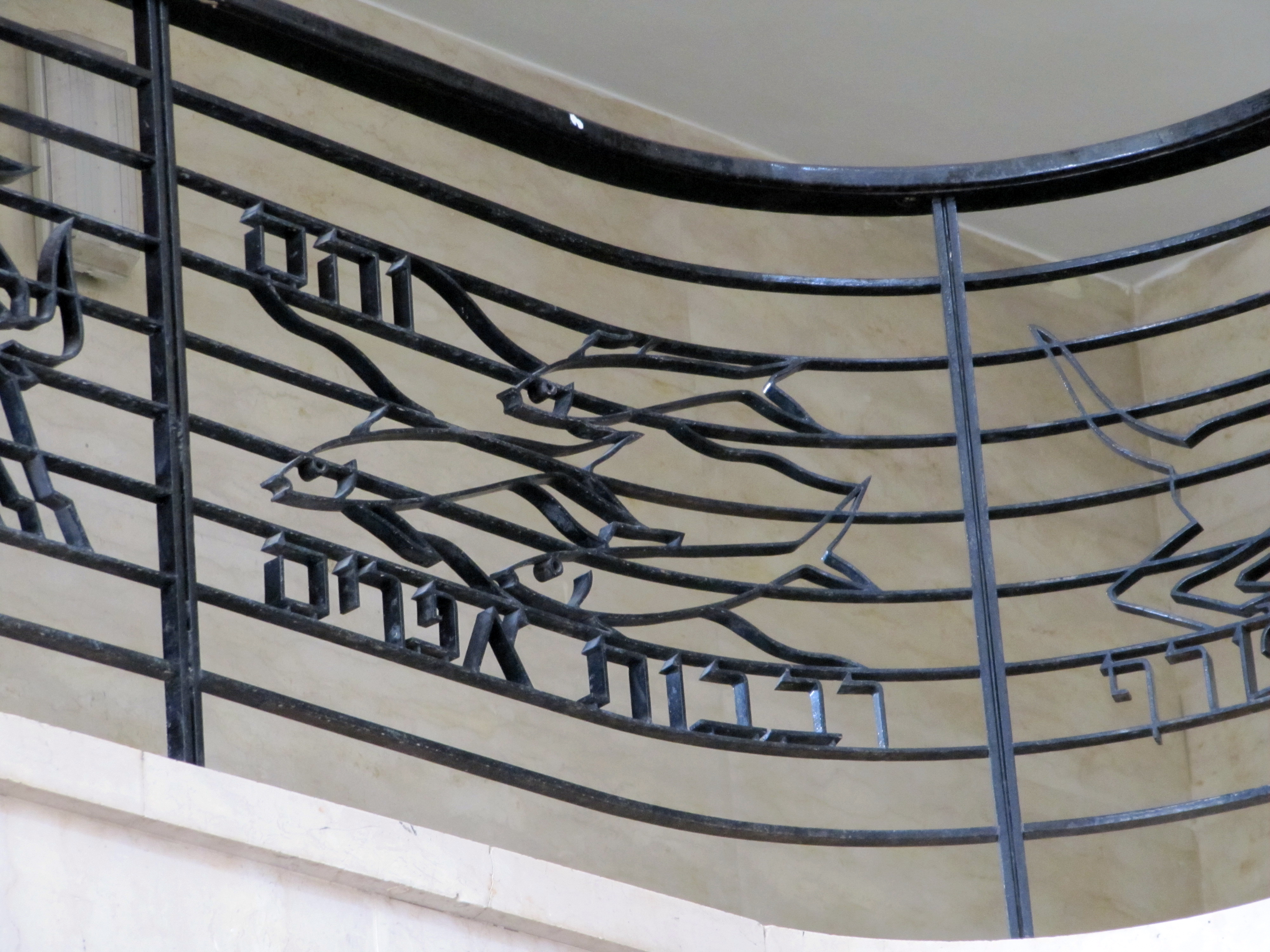
The Twelve Tribes Balustrade (detail), 1940 Rosenblum Building, Faculty of Law, Hebrew University, Mount Scopus, Jerusalem

Ludwig Yehuda Wolpert was born in Hildesheim, Germany, to a poor Orthodox family. During his childhood he suffered as a result of his family's Lithuanian Jewish (immigrant) origin and was often teased because of his cleft lip. In 1916-1920, he began his studies in sculpture at the Frankfurt School of Art. In 1925–1928, he studied goldsmithing at the Frankfurt School of Art.

== Art career ==
Following the presentation of the works in the 1930 exhibition "Kult und Form" ("Ritual and form") at the Jewish Museum in Berlin, his works became well known in the German Jewish world. His works were greatly influenced by Modernist design, especially the Bauhaus movement. Wolpert's works avoid decoration, relying on clean, geometric shapes. In 1933, following the Nazi rise to power in Germany, he immigrated to the Mandatory Palestine with his family. There he worked for two years in the workshop of Bernhard Friedländer, where he designed and produced silverware and Jewish ceremonial art. Together with Victor Solomon Reese] he made the sculpture "The Flying Camel", the symbol of the "Levant Fair", under the architect Aryeh Elhanani.

== Teaching career ==
In 1935 he began teaching at Bezalel Academy of Arts and Design in Jerusalem, where he headed the Department of Metal together with jeweler David Heinz Gumbel. Wolpert placed an emphasis on the use of Hebrew calligraphy in Jewish ceremonial art. In addition to his teaching, he continued to create modern Judaica at the school’s workshop. In 1942 he established an independent workshop in Jerusalem.

In 1956, Wolpert moved to the United States, where he headed the Tobe Pascher Workshop for Modern Jewish Art at the Jewish Museum in New York City. His notable students included Bernard Bernstein.

== Awards and recognition ==
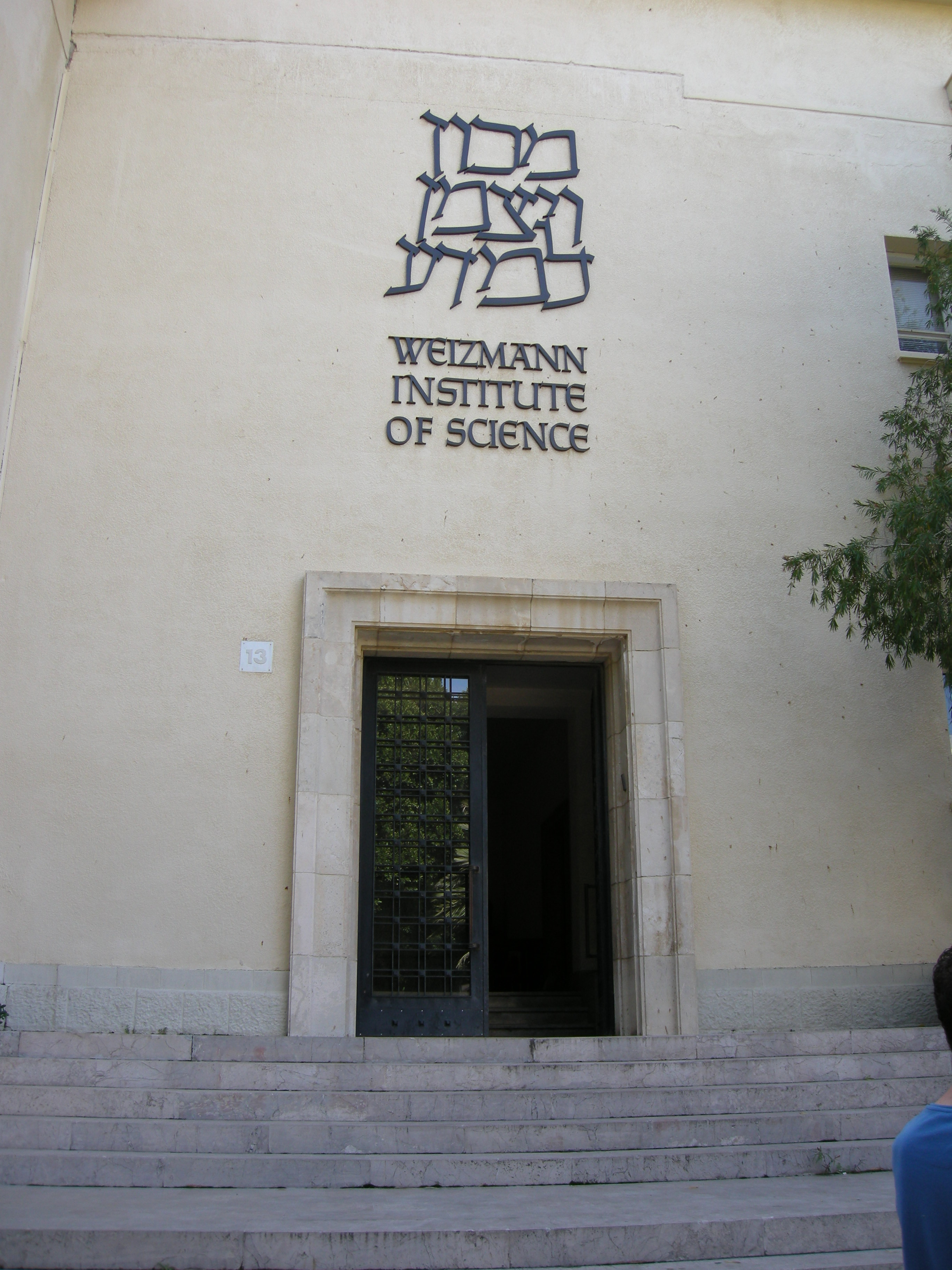
Inscription and Doors to the Weizmann Institute of Science, 1951-1952 Rehovot

- Early 1950s, Nehushtan Company Prize, The Bezalel National Museum, Jerusalem
- 1976 Honorary Doctorate of Hebrew Letters from the Spertus Institute for Jewish Learning and Leadership, Chicago

== Exhibitions ==
- 1933 "Kult und Form", Jewish Museum of Berlin, Germany
- 1939 The Judaica Pavilion, New York World's Fair, New York
- 1953 One-man exhibition, Bezalel Museum, Jerusalem
- 1957 Retrospective exhibition, Jewish Museum of New York
- 1976 Retrospective exhibition, Jewish Museum of New York
- 1976 Retrospective exhibition, Spertus Institute for Jewish Learning and Leadership, Chicago
- 1977 "Wolpert: A Retrospective", The Hebrew Union College Skirball Museum, L.A.
- 2012 "Forging Ahead: Wolpert and Gumbel, Israeli Silversmiths for the Modern Age", Israel Museum, Jerusalem
