= Congregation Anshai Emeth =

Reform synagogue in Peoria, Illinois, United States

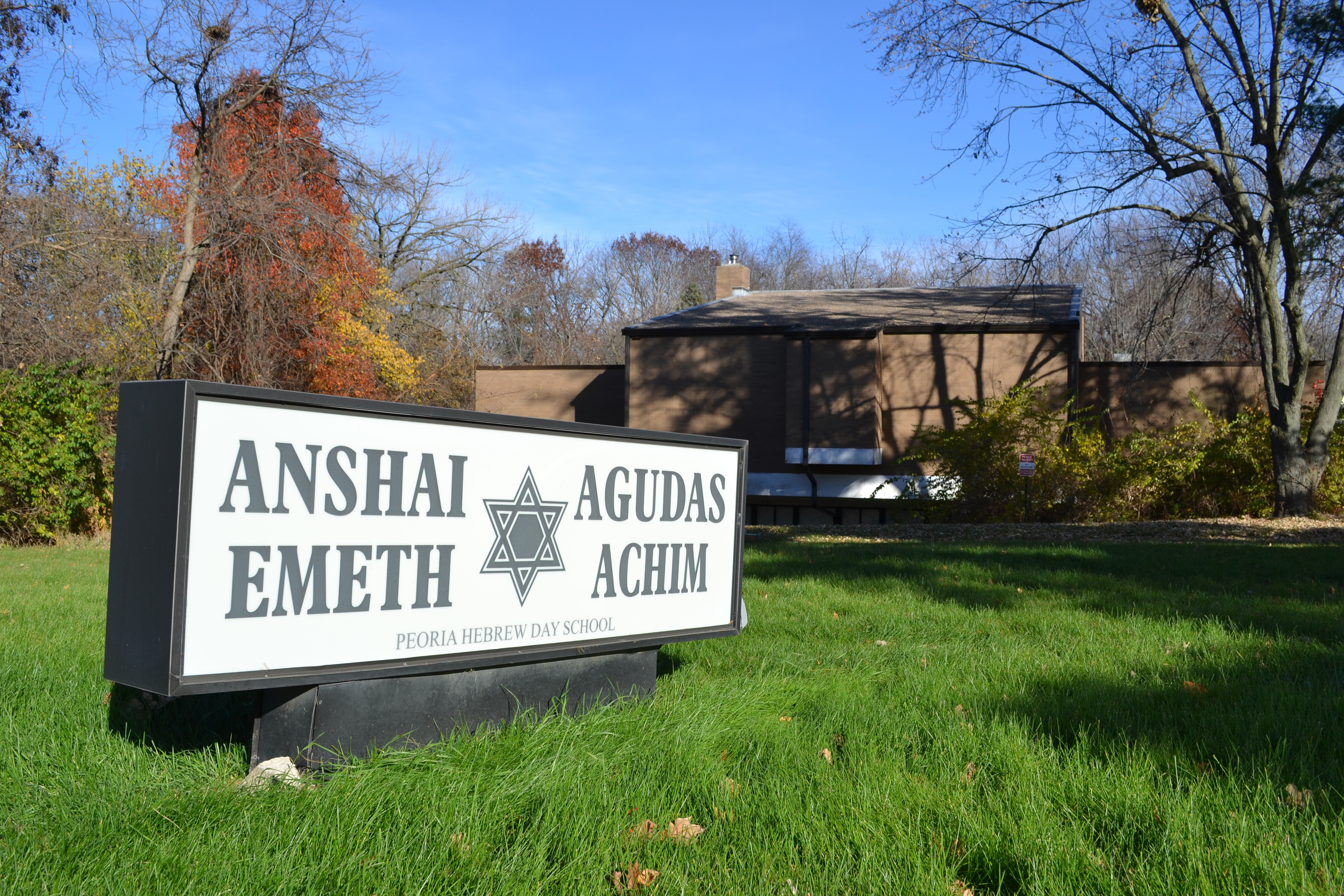
- Sign, with synagogue in the background

- Location in Illinois

Religion
- Affiliation: Reform Judaism
- Ecclesiastical or organizational status: Synagogue
- Leadership: Rabbi Bryna Milkow
- Status: Active

Location
- Location: 5614 North University Street, Peoria, Illinois 61614
- Country: United States
- Interactive map of Congregation Anshai Emeth
- Coordinates: 40°45′22″N 89°36′40″W

Architecture
- Architect: Gyo Obata (1967)
- Type: Synagogue
- Style: Modernist
- Established: 1859 (as a congregation)
- Completed: 1863 (Fulton St.); 1880 (Fulton St.); 1898 (Monroe St.); 1967 (N. University St.)
- Direction of façade: South

Website
- anshaiemeth.org

Congregation Anshai Emeth (Hebrew: אנשי אמת, 'People of Truth') is a Reform Jewish congregation and synagogue located at 5614 North University Street, in Peoria, Illinois, in the United States. Established in 1859, the synagogue is the second oldest Jewish congregation in Illinois, and as of 2019 has the largest membership of any Jewish congregation in Peoria.

Rabbi Bryna Milkow has served as the rabbi of the congregation since July 2017.

== History ==
=== Early days ===
In about 1847, Anshai Emeth was founded when several Jewish families, immigrants from Western Europe affiliated with the Reform movement, came together to establish an organized religious community in the Peoria area. At first they gathered in either members houses or various buildings around Peoria. Later, services were held in various places such as Washington House on North Washington Street.

Religious classes were organized in 1852. The congregation also purchased land for a cemetery in 1852. In 1859, Max Newman collected $3,000 toward a Jewish house of worship in Peoria.

On May 2, 1863, they purchased a former Presbyterian church as the first synagogue in Peoria on Fulton, between Adams and Jefferson. The congregation had about 34 members in 1863.

=== Beth Israel ===
On October 2, 1874, new Jewish immigrants from Russia, Poland and Hungary affiliated with the Orthodox movement left Anshai Emeth to found their own congregation, named Beth Israel. They purchased the church on Seventh Street near Franklin, originally the Central Christian Church built in 1855. After years of tensions between the two synagogues, in 1886 the two were united again, with Beth Israel selling their building and turning over their accounts to Anshai Emeth. Members of the community who did not wish to join the Reform congregation continued to hold services on their own where they could. That community would later create Congregation Agudas Achim, at first affiliated with the Orthodox movement.

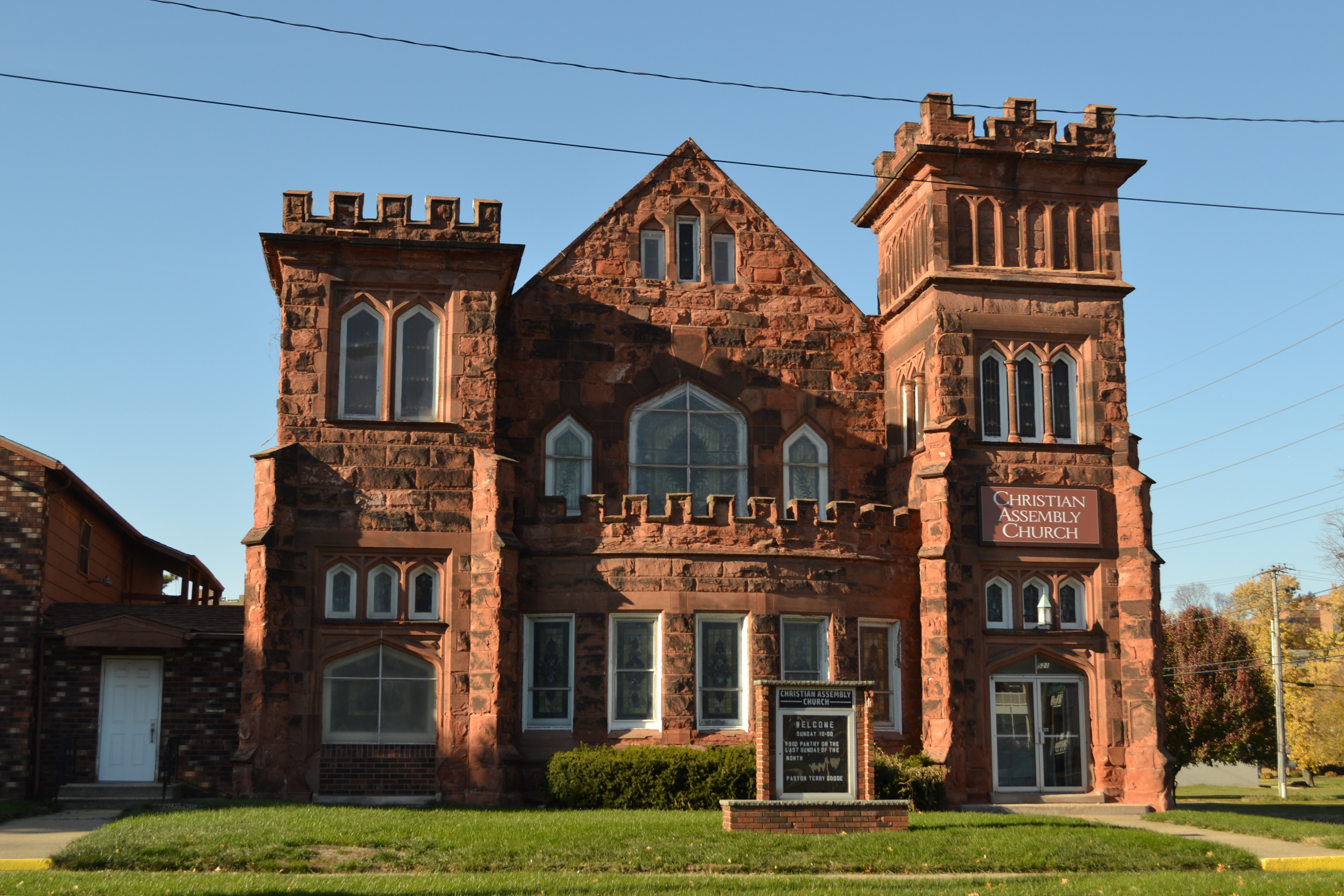
Temple built in 1898 at 521 NE Monroe St, now the Christian Assembly Church

=== New temples in 1880 and 1898 ===
The congregation constructed a new temple on Fulton in 1880. Rabbi Isaac Mayer Wise, founder of American Reform Judaism, attended the dedication. In 1896, the temple on Fulton was destroyed by fire. A new temple was erected on the corner of Monroe and Hancock. Erected in 1898 of Lake Superior sandstone, the cornerstone was laid on March 2, 1898, and was dedicated on September 9, 1898; Rabbi Wise attended the dedication. This Gothic Revival style temple served the congregation until 1967. The Fulton building was sold to the Christian Assembly Church. Charles S. Levi served as rabbi from 1898 to 1912.

=== 1958 bombing ===
On October 14, 1958, a crude pipe bomb exploded in the stairwell of the rear annex and shafted a basement door and a dozen windows. An identical, unexploded pipe bomb had been found 16 months earlier at the Agudas Achim synagogue's construction site, at the corner of War Memorial and Sheridan. Police chief Bernard Kennedy dismissed anti-Semitism as the motive, citing "mental derangement" instead. Rabbi Joseph L. Ginsberg stated he believed it had some connection to a bombing of an Atlanta synagogue days earlier. FBI special agent Robert D. Gibbons of the Springfield, Illinois office investigated. President Eisenhower commented that the bombing was "a shocking and deplorable thing." There were approximately 700 members in October 1958. As of December 1958, the crime was still unsolved.

=== New temple in 1967 ===
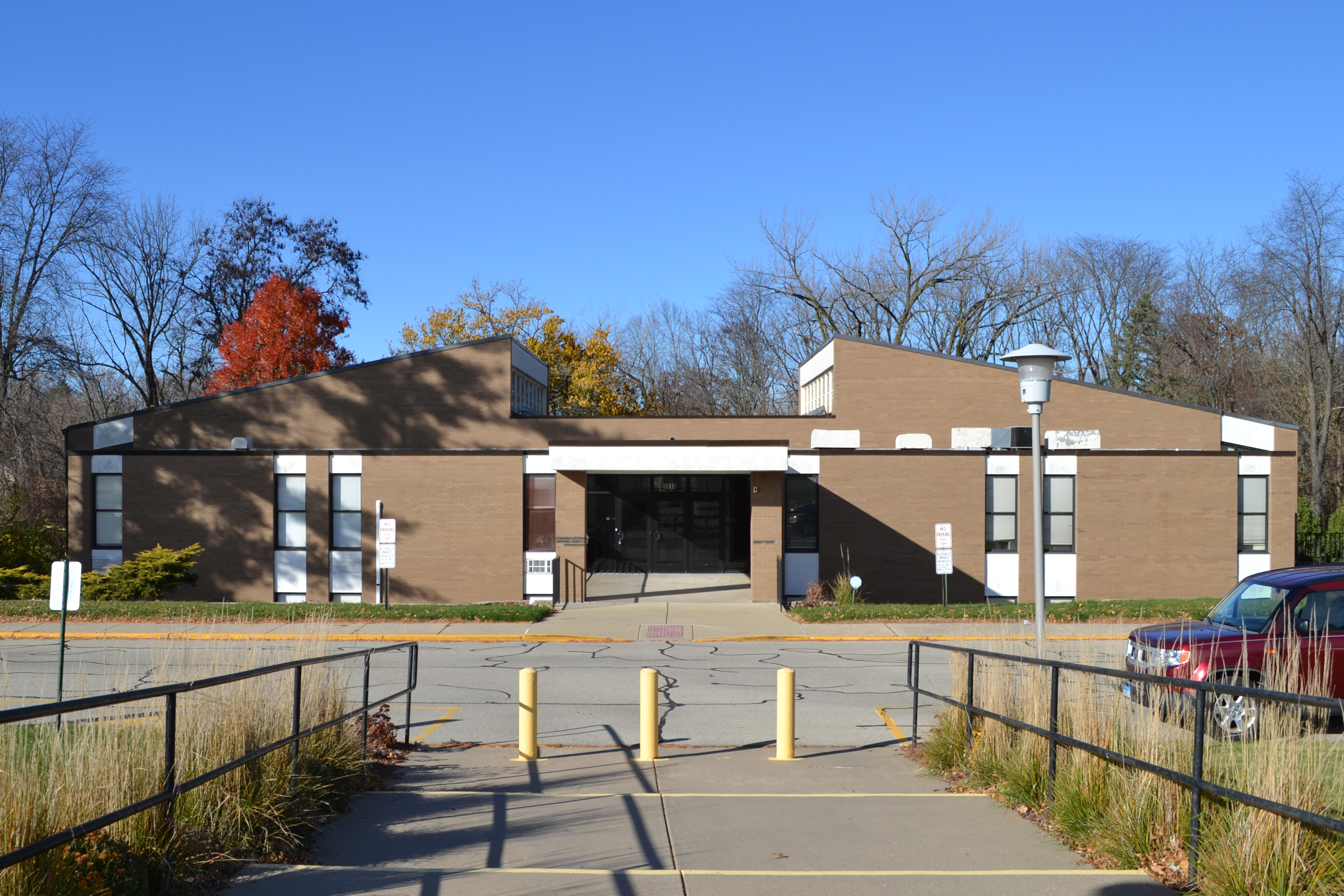
Temple at 5614 N. University St.

A new synagogue, designed by Gyo Obata in the Modernist style, was dedicated on September 8, 1967.

The Peoria Hebrew Day School, a private Jewish school, was established in 1971 and is housed in the lower half the building. It is the only Jewish Day School in downstate Illinois.

As of 1994, Congregation Agudas Achim, the Peoria traditional Jewish congregation, was invited to move into the building housing Anshai Emeth as well. On January 1, 2005, the two congregations finalized a sharing agreement. The old library was converted into a chapel with a new Ark, and a storage closet converted to a kosher kitchen.

=== Sesquicentennial ===
The congregation celebrated 150 years in 2008 with events like a live auction, performance by Debbie Friedman, appearances by Rabbi Eric Yoffie and Rabbi Dan Rabishaw, and a large banquet. In 2010, Anshai Emeth was the only synagogue at the sesquicentennial house of worship event hosted by the state historical society in Wheaton, Illinois.

In May 2020, a dozen windows were smashed at the temple with bricks or rocks, causing an estimated $11,000 in damage to the Peoria Hebrew School section of the building. Anshai Emeth president Steven Marx said it was just vandalism and not likely an anti-Semitic act. As of October 2023, the temple had increased security measures such as surveillance cameras and bulletproof windows.

== Notable members ==
- Betty Friedan
- Susan G. Komen, and her parents, Marvin and Eleanor Goodman, and her husband, Stanley Komen

== See also ==
- History of the Jews in Illinois
