= Charles Levin =

Charles Levin may refer to:

- Charles Levin (actor) (1949–2019), American actor
- Charles Levin (judge) (1926–2020), former Michigan jurist

== See also ==
- Charles Levi (musician), bassist
- Charles S. Levi, English-American rabbi
- Charles A. Levine (1897–1991), first passenger aboard a transatlantic flight
