= Tobi Kahn =

American painter and sculptor (born 1952)

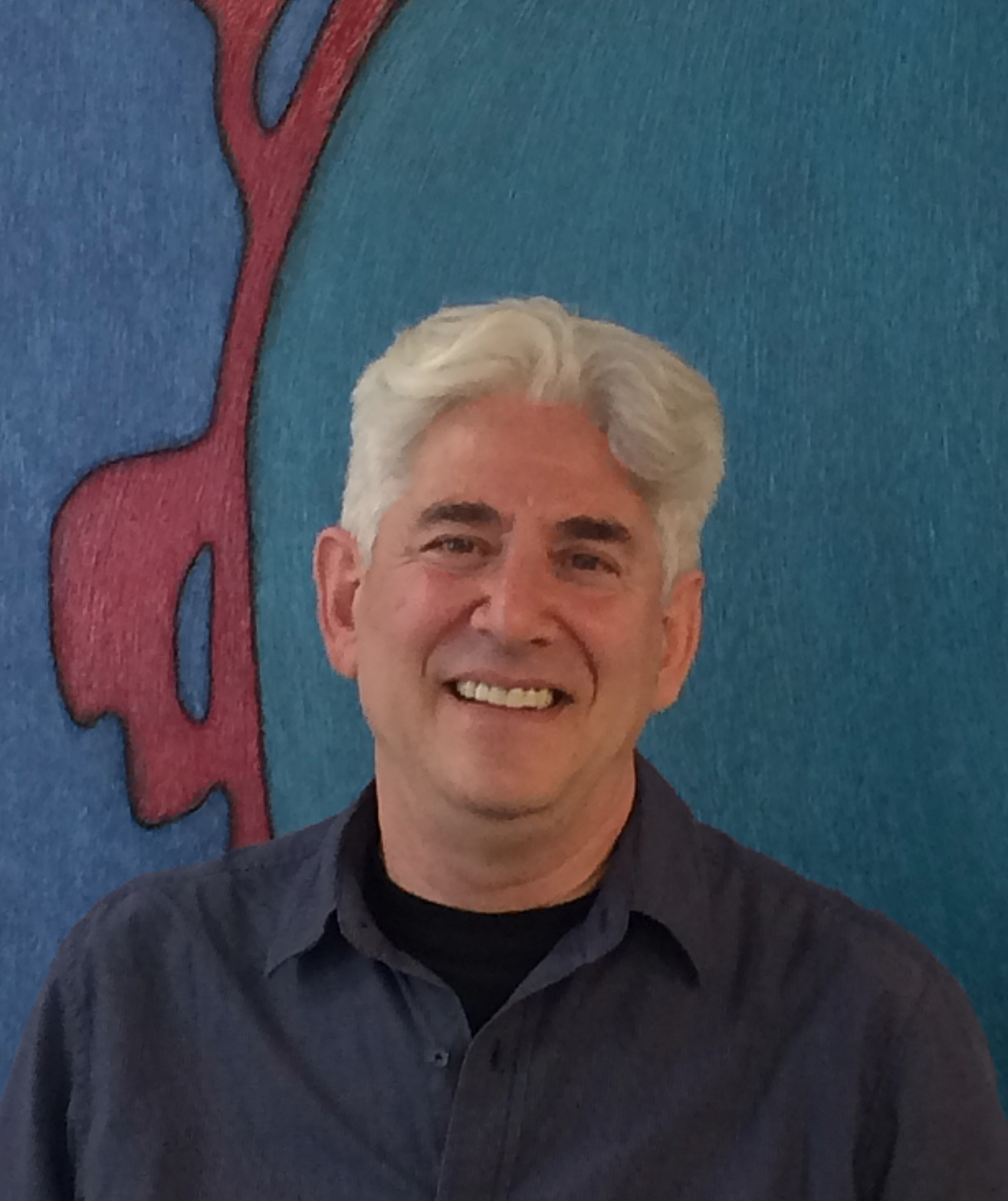
- Born: 1952 (74)
- Education: Hunter College, Pratt Institute
- Known for: Painting, sculpture, photography, works on paper, ceremonial objects, and sacred spaces
- Website: https://tobikahn.com/

Tobi Kahn (born 1952) is an American painter and sculptor. Kahn lives and works in New York City and is on the faculty at the School of Visual Arts.

== Life and career ==
Tobi Kahn was born in the Washington Heights neighborhood of New York City, the son of Holocaust survivors. He is named for his uncle Arthur Kahn, believed to be the first Jew murdered by the Nazi regime.

Kahn received a B.A. from Hunter College in 1976, majoring in photography and printmaking. He graduated summa cum laude and went on to receive an MFA from Pratt Institute in 1978 in painting and sculpture.

Kahn communicates his vision through his passion for teaching. For over 40 years, he has taught fine arts and visual thinking at the School of Visual Arts in New York City. Kahn has designed the arts curriculum for several high schools in the New York area. Kahn lectures extensively at universities and public forums internationally on the importance of visual language and on art as healing.

Among the awards Kahn has received are the Outstanding Alumni Achievement Award from Pratt Institute in 2000; the Cultural Achievement Award for the Visual Arts from the National Foundation of Jewish Culture in 2004; and an honorary doctorate from the Jewish Theological Seminary in 2007 for his work as an artist and educator.

== Work ==
Kahn's early works draw on the tradition of American visionary landscape painting, and his more recent pieces reflect his fascination with contemporary science, inspired by the micro-images of cell formations, satellite images and photography. Kahn's work has been featured in over 70 solo exhibitions including at the Butler Institute of American Art, Fort Wayne Museum of Art, Museum of Fine Arts, Houston, the Neuberger Museum of Art, the Weatherspoon Art Museum, Pennsylvania Academy of Fine Arts, The Grey Art Museum-NYU, Skirball Cultural Center, CA, Portland Museum of Art, ME, Yale University Art Gallery, The Phillips Collection, D.C., and, most recently, the Boca Raton Museum of Art.

Kahn also creates ceremonial objects (Judaica). A practice which began as a private one, creating objects for his family, he began to include his ritual art in exhibitions in the late 1990s. Kahn's work "blur[s] the lines between spiritual and secular, between fine art and decorative object."

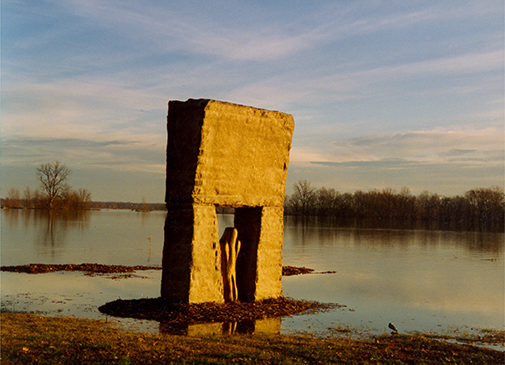
Tobi Kahn, SHALEV, New Harmony, Indiana 1993

Kahn's creative practice also includes the creation of sacred spaces including a nondenominational contemplative space, an installation to reflect on the tenth anniversary of September 11, and specifically Jewish spaces as well as ceremonial and liturgical art.

Before the early 1990s, Kahn was known mainly for his painting. In 1993, he received his first commission for a large-scale sculpture. "SHALEV" was commissioned by Jane Owen and the Robert Lee Blaffer Trust for New Harmony, Indiana.

== Exhibitions and public commissions ==
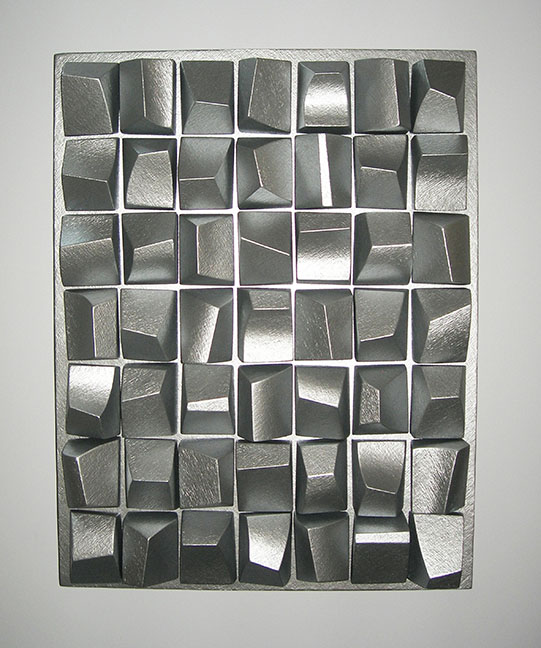
Tobi Kahn, Silver Omer Counter

In 2024, ALOMH, Sculptural Outdoor Installation for Jefferson Hospital’s Honickman Center, Philadelphia, PA. Memory & Inheritance: Paintings and Ceremonial Objects by Tobi Kahn, The Museum at Eldridge Street, NY (catalogue).

In 2022, Tobi Kahn Unit: 7 Works in the Permanent Collection, The Phillips Collection, Washington, D.C. Elemental: A Decade of Paintings by Tobi Kahn, PAC/MoCA, Long Island, NY (catalogue). FORMATION: Images of the Body-Tobi Kahn, Dadian Gallery, Henry Luce the III Center for Art and Religion, Washington, D.C. (catalogue). IMKHA, a meditative installation installed in the Marlene Myerson JCC of Manhattan. This installation is reconfigured as a Sukkah annually.

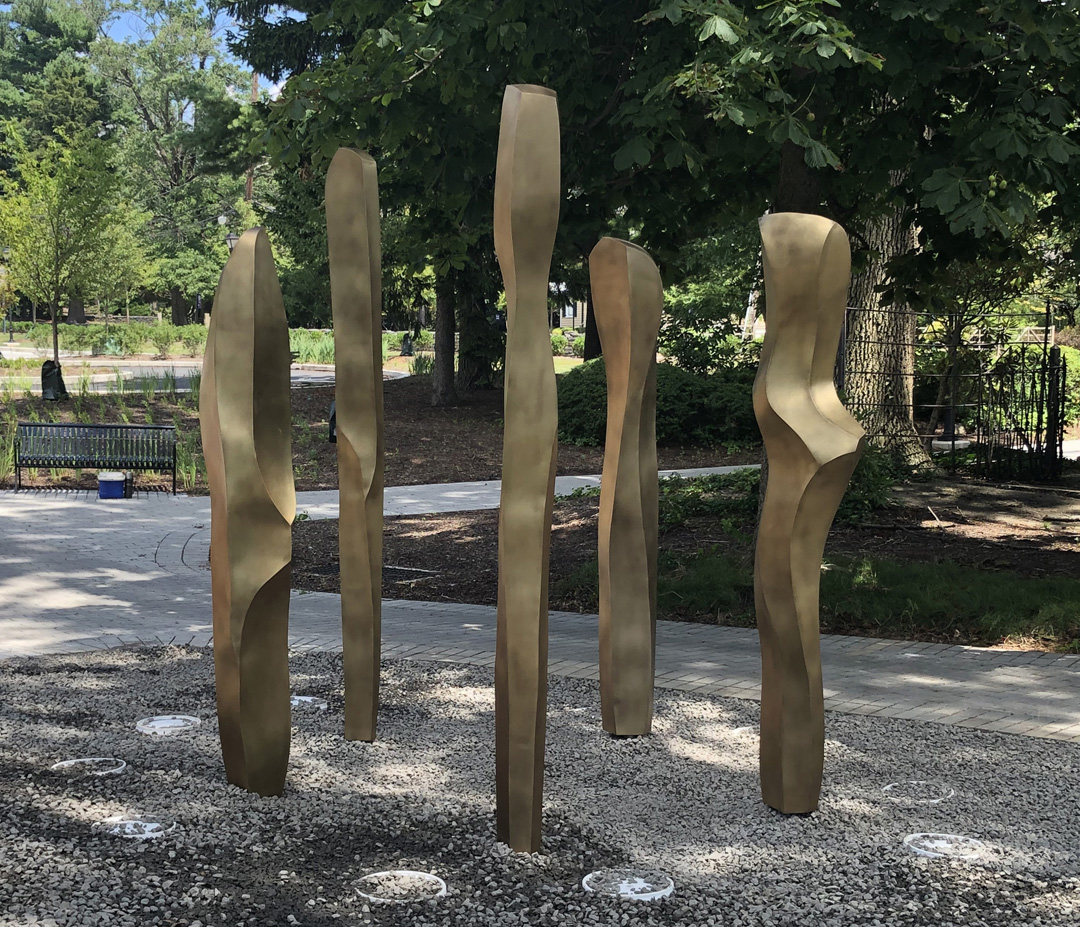
Installation of 5 bronze integrated sculptures by Tobi Kahn at Jefferson University

In 2020, an outdoor sculptural installation consisting of 5 bronzes was installed on the East Falls campus of Jefferson University, Philadelphia, PA, as well as a 3-panel painting installed in the Ronson Building on that campus. A commission, YZKAR, bronze memorial lights using remaindered steel from the World Trade Center, were installed at The 9/11 Memorial Museum, NY as well as the Grey Art Museum-NYU.

In 2018, Tobi Kahn: Aura- New Paintings From Nature, a solo exhibition, opened at the Museum of Art - DeLand.

In 2017, Anointed Time: Sculpture and Ceremonial Objects by Tobi Kahn was on view at The Butler Institute of American Art, Youngstown, OH. This exhibition involved Kahn's work from the early 1980s to 2017 and was first time his shrines, sculpture, and ceremonial art were all on view together.

In 2017, Kahn had paintings included in the group show, Golem, at the Jewish Museum Berlin.

In 2015, Reverie: Tobi Kahn, a solo show of current work opened at the Cornell Museum of Rollins College, Winter Park, FL. In that same year Meridian: Paintings and Ceremonial Art of Tobi Kahn was on view at the Fort Wayne Museum of Art, Indiana. In 2012, IMMANCE: The Art of Tobi Kahn, a solo exhibition of paintings from 1987-2012 opened at the Philadelphia Museum of Jewish Art, Philadelphia, PA. Another exhibition, RIFA-Sky and Water Installation, ran concurrently in Philadelphia at the National Museum of American Jewish History and had an accompanying catalogue.

In November 2011, ALIGNED, Paintings by Tobi Kahn, a solo exhibition of paintings curated by John Shipman, opened at the University of Maryland Art Gallery with an accompanying catalogue.

In September 2011, Embodied Light: 9-11 in 2011, an installation was commissioned by the Educational Alliance of New York in commemoration of the tenth anniversary of 9/11 and exhibited in the Ernest Rubenstein Gallery at the Education Alliance. An associated catalogue was published with essays by Maya Benton, Norman L. Kleeblatt, James E. Young and meditations by Nessa Rapoport. This exhibition traveled to the Islip Art Museum in 2012.

Rendering the Unthinkable: Artists Respond to 9/11 a group exhibition described as "a selection of works from 13 New York artists deeply affected by 9/11" and was on view at the National September 11 Memorial & Museum September 2016- January 2018 an included an installation by Kahn titled M'AHL. The other artists involved were Blue Man Group, Gustavo Bonevardi, Monika Bravo, Eric Fischl, Donna Levinstone, Michael Mulhern, Colleen Mulrenan Macfarlane, Christopher Saucedo, Manju Shandler, Doug and Mike Starn, Todd Stone, and Ejay Weiss.

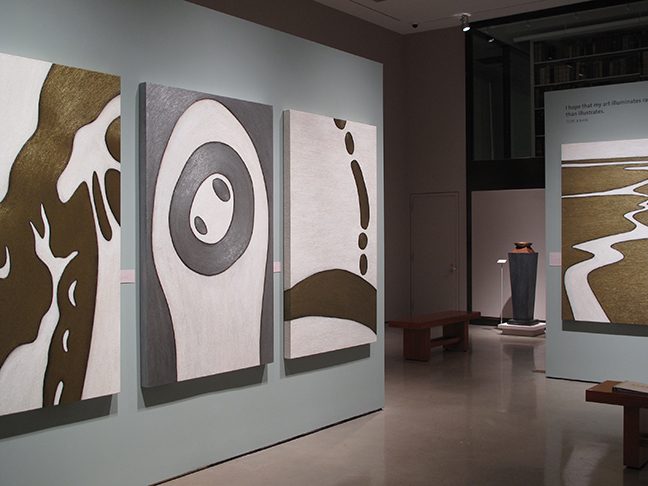
Tobi Kahn: Sacred Spaces for the 21st Century (installation view) The Museum of Biblical Art, November 2009

In October 2009 Tobi Kahn: Sacred Spaces for the 21st Century, a solo traveling exhibition of ceremonial and liturgical art, opened at the Museum of Biblical Art (MOBIA) in NYC. A catalogue of the same title, edited by Ena Giurescu Heller and published by the Museum of Biblical Art in New York in association with D Giles Limited, London, accompanied the exhibition. The publication includes essays by Jeff Edwards, Heller, Kahn, David Morgan, Klaus Ottmann, and Daniel Sperber, with meditations by Nessa Rapoport.

In 2008 Kahn was commissioned to create eight wall-scale paintings and ritual objects, including the eternal light, mezuzah, and panels for the ark doors, for the sanctuary of Congregation Emanu-El B'ne Jeshurun, Milwaukee, WI.

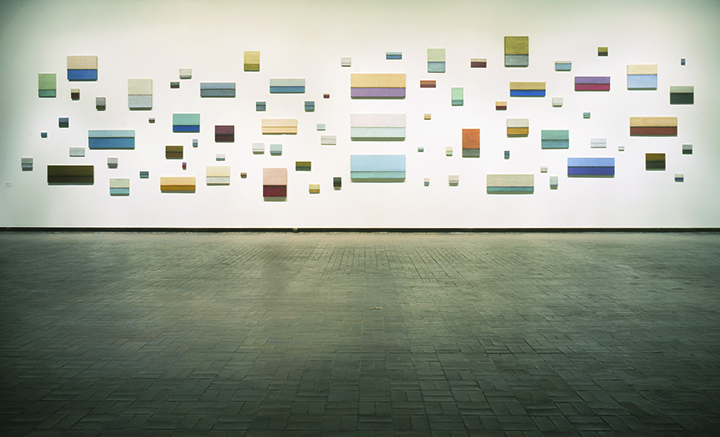
Tobi Kahn: Sky and Water at The Neuberger Museum of Art, Purchase College, 2003 (installation view)

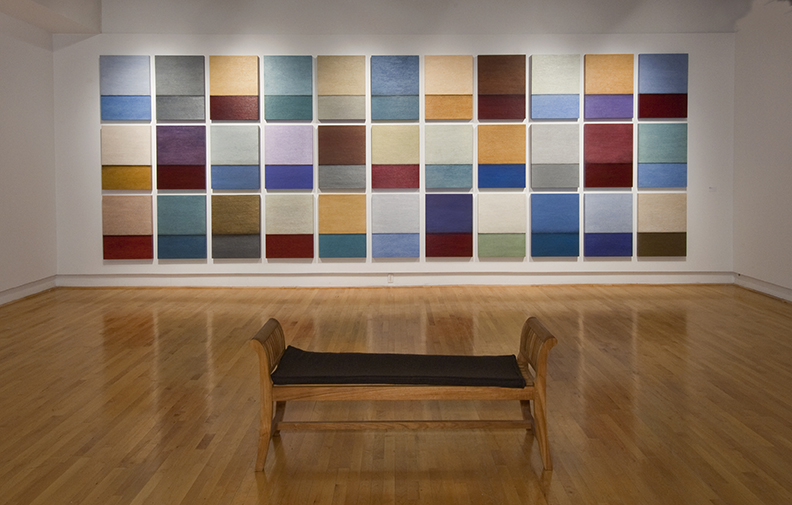
Tobi Kahn, ALIGNED, installation view, University of Maryland 2011

The 2003 exhibition Tobi Kahn: Sky and Water at The Neuberger Museum of Art, Purchase College, was a monumental installation of 106 paintings. The accompanying catalogue includes essays by Dede Young, who curated the exhibition, and by Donald Kuspit.

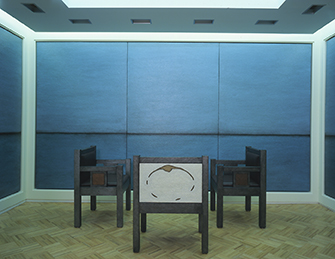
Tobi Kahn, EMET Healthcare Chaplaincy, 2002

In 2002, The HealthCare Chaplaincy of New York commissioned Kahn to create a nondenominational meditative space. The resulting space, EMET, was built to the artist's specifications to house nine sky-and-water murals and a set of sculptural furniture also created by Kahn.

Landscape at the Millennium: Installations by Tobi Kahn and Pat Steir; Nineteenth-Century Paintings from the Parrish Art Museum and the Albright-Knox Art Gallery was on view at the Albright-Knox Art Gallery November 20, 1999- Sunday, January 2, 2000.

The ten year survey exhibition, Tobi Kahn: Metamorphoses, curated by Peter Selz with an accompanying catalogue including essays by Peter Selz, Dore Ashton and Michael Brenson, traveled to 8 museums across the country from 1997-1999. Art in America included Metamorphoses in its national museum preview list.

In 1999, the solo exhibition, AVODAH: Objects of the Spirit opened in New York at Hebrew Union College and traveled to over 20 venues over a 9-year period throughout the United States. An accompanying book, "Objects of the Spirit: Ritual and the Art of Tobi Kahn" was published by Hudson Hills Press and the Avodah Institute, and edited by Emily Bilski.

Kahn created the set design for the 1990 Elizabeth Swados production of "Jonah" at the Public Theater in New York. That same year, he also conceived and created the set for Muna Tseng's "Ways, Shrines, Mysteries" at Florence Gould Hall in New York. Kahn was selected as one of nine artists to be included in the 1985 New Horizons in American Art exhibition at the Solomon R. Guggenheim Museum.

Kahn's work has also been exhibited at The Museum of Fine Arts, Houston, TX, The Weatherspoon Art Museum, NC, Fairfield University Art Museum, CT, Colby College Museum of Art, ME, The Skirball Cultural Center, CA, the Museum of Contemporary Religious Art in St. Louis, the Evansville Museum and in the Museum of Biblical Art (MOBIA) in New York.

== Personal life ==
Kahn is married to writer Nessa Rapoport. They have three children.
