= Philadelphia Museum of Jewish Art =

- Location within Philadelphia
- Location: 1975
- Coordinates: 39.96383°N 75.16068°W
- Public transit access: L Spring Garden
- Website: rodephshalom.org/philadelphia-museum-of-jewish-art/

The Philadelphia Museum of Jewish Art, which was founded in 1975, is located within historic Congregation Rodeph Shalom in Philadelphia, Pennsylvania.

== History and notable features ==
Dedicated to exhibiting contemporary art that illuminates the Jewish experience, this museum has organized solo and group exhibitions of work in many media by artists of diverse backgrounds.

In addition to its special-exhibit gallery, the museum features a permanent collection of important works by accomplished artists including William Anastasi, Chaim Gross, Tobi Kahn, Joan Snyder, Shelley Spector, Boaz Vaadia and Roman Vishniac.

Showcased in the Thalheimer Entrance Foyer of the synagogue on Broad Street is the museum's Leon J. and Julia S. Obermayer Collection of Jewish Ritual Art.
