= Congregation Emanu-El B'ne Jeshurun =

Reform synagogue in River Hills, Wisconsin

Congregation Emanu-El B'ne Jeshrun
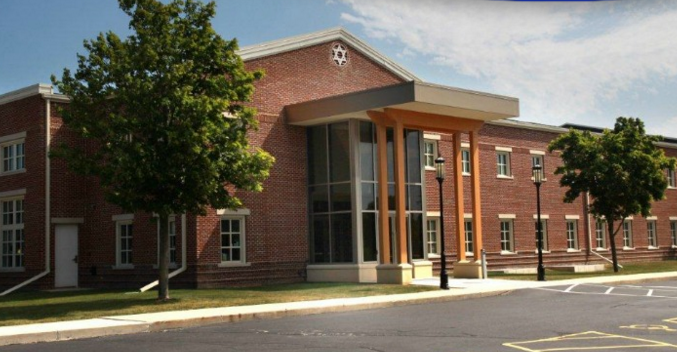
- Emanu-El B'ne Jeshrun synagogue

- Location in Wisconsin

Religion
- Affiliation: Reform Judaism
- Ecclesiastical or organisational status: Synagogue
- Leadership: Rabbi Jessica Barolsky; Rabbi Marc Berkson (Emeritus)
- Status: Active
- Religious features: Sanctuary art by Tobi Kahn

Location
- Location: 2020 West Brown Deer Road, River Hills, Wisconsin
- Country: United States
- Coordinates: 43°10′43″N 87°56′09″W

Architecture
- Architect: Phillip Katz
- Type: Synagogue
- Established: 1847 (as a congregation in Milwaukee)
- Completed: 2009

Website
- ceebj.org

Congregation Emanu-El B'ne Jeshurun, abbreviated as Emanu-El, is a Reform Jewish synagogue located at 2020 West Brown Deer Road, River Hills, Wisconsin, in the United States. The congregation was founded in 1847 and the current synagogue completed in 2009.

== Founding ==
Congregation Emanu-El B'ne Jeshurun began in Milwaukee in 1847 with 12 men who gathered at the home of Isaac Neustadel for a Yom Kippur service. In 1850, after three years of services in homes and above businesses, the growing community named themselves Congregation Imanu-Al. In 1854, those who wished to worship in the Polish tradition, as opposed to the German, left to form Congregation Ahavath Emuno. Following that, members of Ahavath Emuno who found they preferred the German style, left to form a third congregation, Anshe Emeth, for a total of three synagogues in the small Jewish community of 200 families.

When Isaac Mayer Wise, the founder of Reform Judaism, visited Milwaukee in 1856, he persuaded Imanu-Al and Ahavath Emuno to consolidate into Congregation B’ne Jeshurun. Anshe Emeth joined them three years later. On September 16, 1859 the 115 Jewish families of Milwaukee were united in a ceremony complete with a procession, a ball, and speeches in both English and German. Nathan Pereles was elected president of the new congregation at a salary of $800 a year. However, 13 years later, they were split again, as 35 families split off to Congregation Emanu-El. The two synagogues stayed apart for fifty-eight years.

== Moving and expansion ==
In 1922 Emanu-El, in need of larger facilities, began building at 2419 East Kenwood Boulevard. Meanwhile, B'ne Jeshurun's building on 10th and Cedar was also beginning to feel cramped, resulting in arguments about the placement of the new location. In 1927, Milwaukee County informed them that the building would have to be torn down to make room for the new County Courthouse. After a lengthy discussion within B'ne Jeshurun's own congregation and with Emanu-El, the two congregations combined in the building on Kenwood (now the Helene Zelazo Center for the Performing Arts) on September 15, 1927. Congregation Emanu-El B'ne Jeshurun had been formed.

In 2000 the congregation moved to the Joseph and Vera Zilber campus at 2020 West Brown Deer Road. Renovations by Phillip Katz began in 2008 and were completed in 2009. The new sanctuary has art by notable Judaic artist Tobi Kahn.

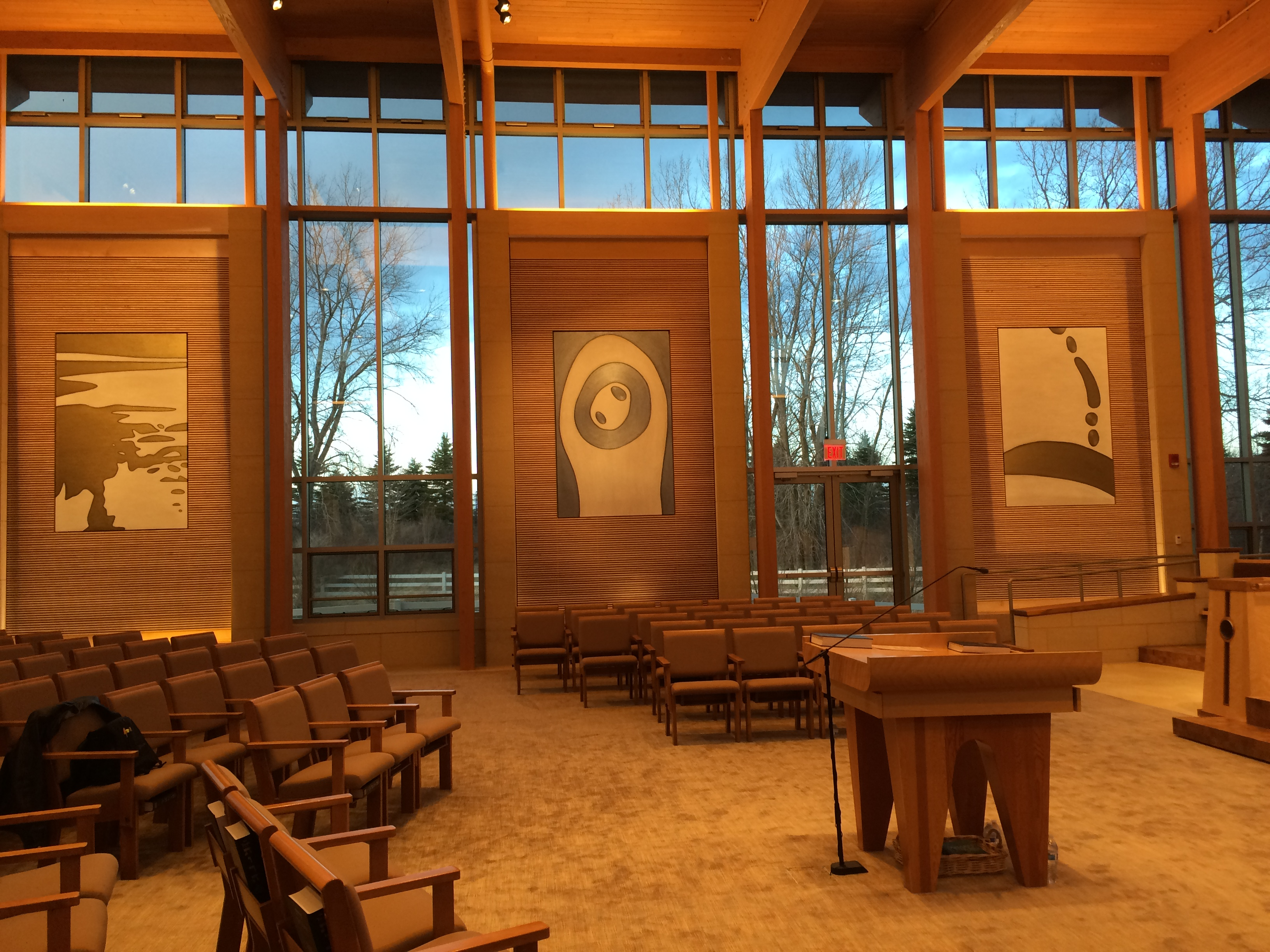
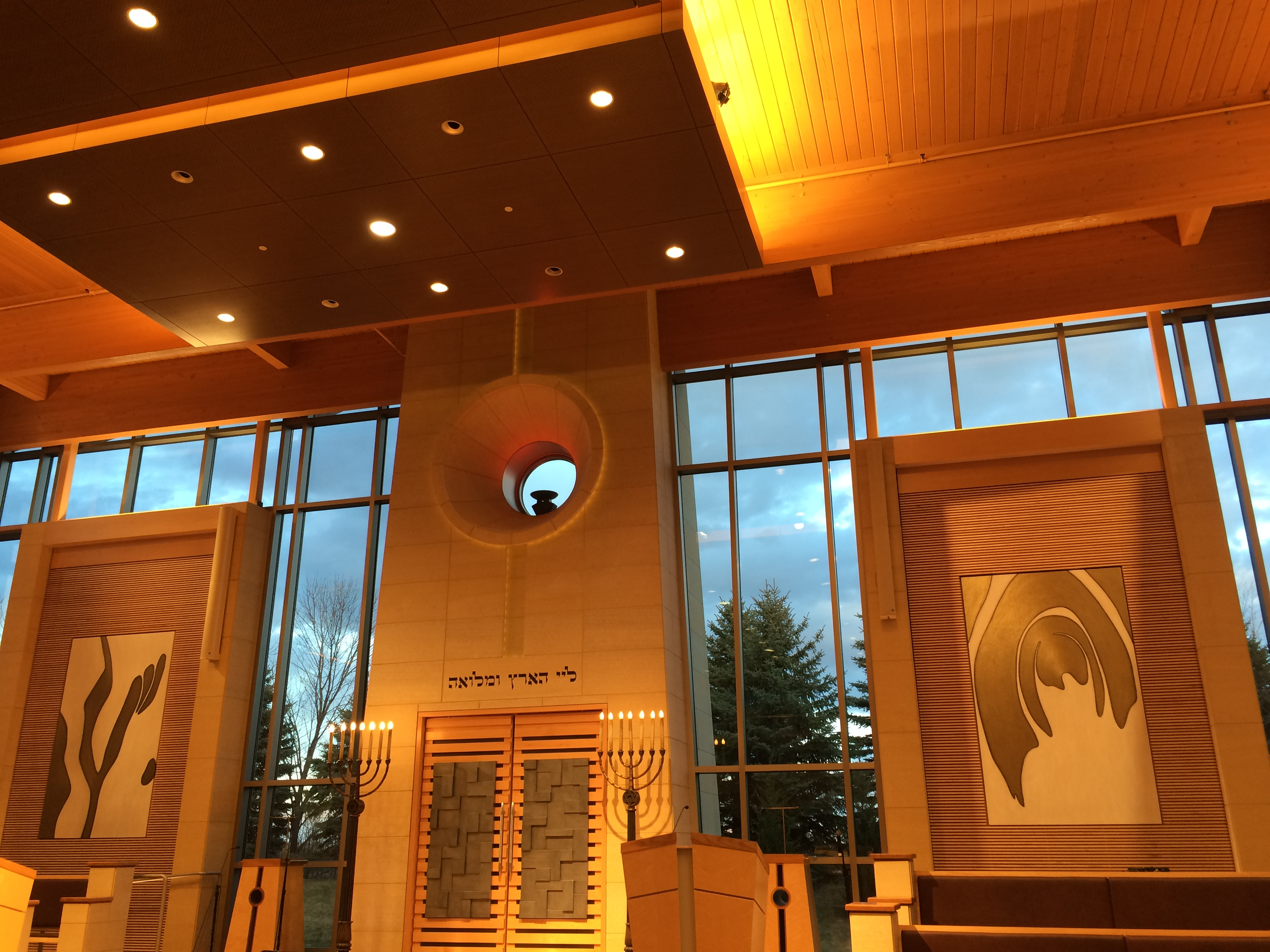
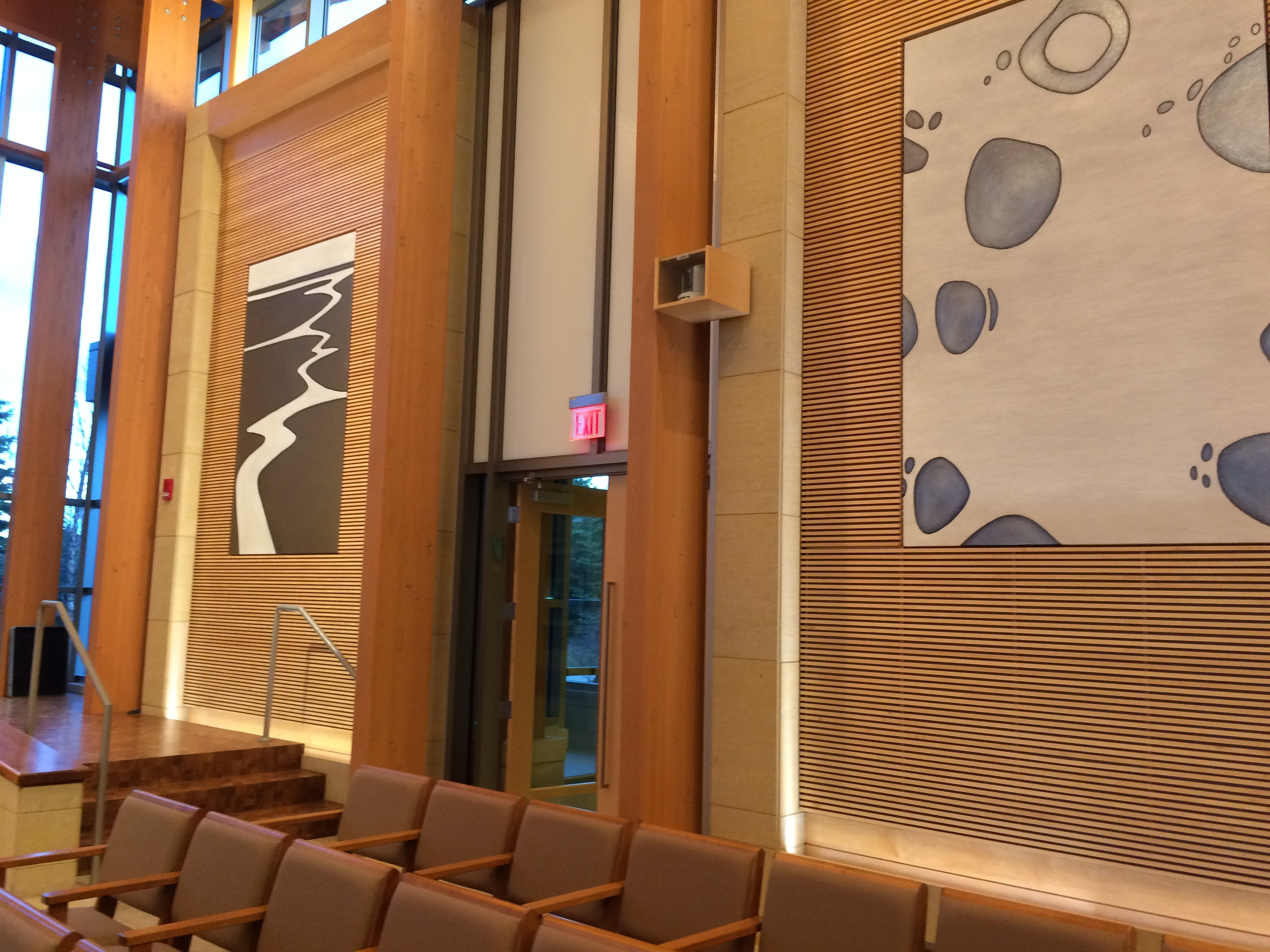
The sanctuary of Congregation Emanu-El B'ne Jeshurun, with art by Tobi Kahn

== Clergy ==
=== Congregation B'ne Jeshurun ===
The following individuals have served as rabbi of Congregation B'ne Jeshurun:

- Rabbi Isidor Kalisch — 1857-60
- Rabbi Ferdinand Leopold Sarner — 1860
- Rabbi Samson Falk — 1863-66
- Rabbi G.M. Cohen — 1868
- Rabbi Elias Eppstein — 1869-80
- Rabbi Emanuel Gerechter — 1880-92
- Rabbi Charles S. Levi — 1913-28

=== Congregation Emanu-El ===
The following individuals have served as rabbi of Congregation Emanu-El:

- Rabbi Edward Benj. Morris Browne — 1870
- Rabbi Moritz Spitz — 1872-78
- Rabbi Isaac S. Moses — 1879-87
- Rabbi Sigmund Hecht — 1888-99
- Rabbi Julius Meyer — 1900-04
- Rabbi Samuel Hirshberg — 1904-47

=== Congregation Emanu-El B'ne Jeshurun ===
The following individuals have served as rabbi of Emanu-El B'ne Jeshurun:

- Rabbi Joseph L. Baron — 1926-51
- Rabbi Herbert H. Friedman — 1951-55
- Rabbi Dudley Weinberg — 1955-76
- Rabbi F. Barry Silberg — 1974-99
- Rabbi Marc Berkson — 1999-2023
- Rabbi Jessica Barolsky — 2023-
