= History of the Jews in Illinois =

The history of the Jews in Illinois dates back to 1793, when John Hays, the region's first postmaster, settled in Cahokia from his native New York. The most prominent Jew in Illinois' early days was Abraham Jonas (politician), who moved to Quincy from Cincinnati in 1838. In 1842 he was elected to the Illinois Legislature, where he met Abraham Lincoln, and became his lifelong friend. Another early Jewish settler was Cap. Samuel Noah, the first Jewish graduate of West Point, who taught school at Mount Pulaski, Illinois in the late 1840s.

As of 2013, Illinois has a Jewish population of 297,935. Approximately three-fourths of them live in Chicago. Peoria and Quincy have the second- and third-largest Jewish communities.

== 19th century ==
=== Chicago ===
See Jewish history in Chicago for further details.

Jews first settled in Chicago in the 1830s. Among the early arrivals was Henry Meyer, an agent of a Jewish colonization society formed in New York in 1842. He settled as a farmer in Cook County and recommended that some Jewish families move to Chicago. The state's first Jewish institutions were soon established in Chicago: the Jewish Burial-Ground Society (established 1846), and the congregations Anshe Ma'arab (1847), B'nai Sholom (1852), Sinai (1861). Since then, 75 more congregations have been organized, 68 of which are in Chicago.

=== Other cities ===
Outside of Chicago, there are eight congregations in seven cities, and numerous dispersed Jews that are members of the Jewish Federation of Southern Illinois.

- Bloomington
- Champaign
- Danville
- Kankakee
- Peoria
- Quincy
- Rockford
- Springfield
- In the 1990s there were around 2,000 Jews in southern Illinois that were united under the Southern Illinois Jewish Federation. The largest cities represented include Alton, Aurora, Belleville, East St. Louis, Cairo, Centralia, Carbondale, Granite City, Benton, Mattoon, and Robinson. Since then, some of these cities have regularly meeting congregations.
- A private Jewish cemetery housing a Jewish family since the 1830s in north Vandalia was desecrated in the early 20th century.
