= Judaic Digital Library =

The Judaic Digital Library is a specialized collection of Judaica titles designed primarily for educators, clergy, as well as advanced students of Hebrew Bible and Jewish Studies. Prepared in Secure Searchable Image Format, it allows its publisher, Varda Books, to deliver authoritative electronic editions of previously published by other publishers, typographically complex books, with advanced online functionality for computer-assisted reading and research.

Most book commentaries on the Hebrew Bible feature numerous "live" biblical references: clicking on any of these references produces The JPS Hebrew-English Tanakh in a separate window that indicates biblical Hebrew verse and its English translation.

JDL includes electronic editions of two major encyclopedias:

- the classic 13-volume Jewish Encyclopedia;
- Hastings' Encyclopedia of Religion and Ethics—along with more than 200 of important, many award-winning, volumes covering virtually all aspects of Jewish experience.
