= Bernard Bernstein (metalsmith) =

American metalsmith (1928–2021)

- Born: August 17, 1928; Bronx, New York, U.S.
- Died: July 28, 2021 (aged 92); New York, U.S.
- Burial place: Beth Israel Cemetery, Woodbridge Township, New Jersey, U.S.
- Education: Rochester Institute of Technology (MFA), New York University (PhD)
- Occupations: Metalsmith, silversmith, teacher

Bernard "Bernie" L. Bernstein (August 17, 1928 – July 28, 2021) was an American metalsmith and teacher. He was known for his silversmith of Judaica. He taught industrial arts for many years at City College of New York, and had a Riverdale workshop.

Bernstein was named a fellow in 2009 of the American Craft Council (ACC).

== Life and career ==
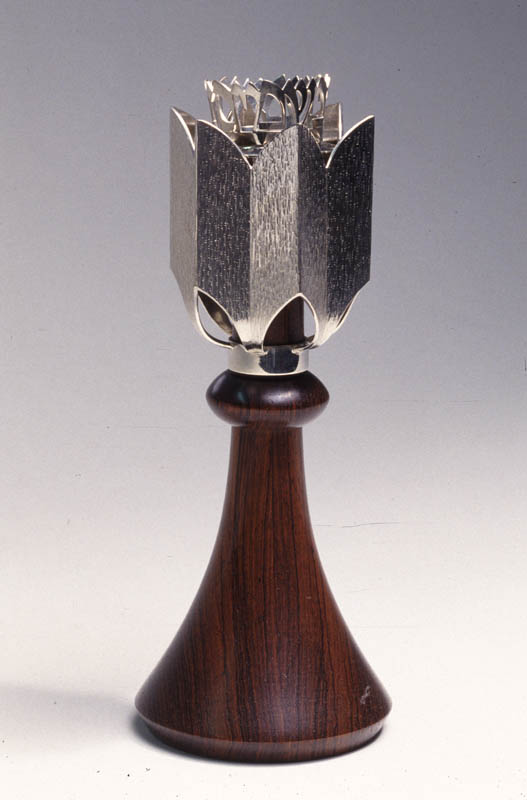
Havdalah Spice Container (1980) by Bernard Bernstein, made of rosewood, silver, from Yeshiva University Museum

Bernard Bernstein was born on August 17, 1928, in Bronx, New York City.

In the 1950s, Bernstein studied with Ludwig Yehuda Wolpert at the Tobe Pascher Workshop at the Jewish Museum. He received a M.F.A. degree from Rochester Institute of Technology (RIT); and a PhD in 1972 from New York University (NYU).

He taught industrial arts for many years at City College of New York. In 2009, Bernstein was named a fellow of the American Craft Council (ACC) of New York.

== Death and legacy ==
Bernstein died on July 28, 2021, in New York. He was buried at Beth Israel Cemetery in Woodbridge Township in New Jersey.

Bernstein's work is included in museum collections, including at the Derfner Judaica Museum; the Brooklyn Museum, the Philadelphia Museum of Art; and Museum of Fine Arts, Boston.

The Bernard Bernstein Archive is part of the Yeshiva University Museum in New York City.

== See also ==
- Kurt Matzdorf (1922–2008) German-born American metalsmith, jewelry designer, and teacher
