= Shelley Spector =

- Born: 1961 (age 64–65); Philadelphia PA
- Education: Pennsylvania Academy of the Fine Arts
- Website: www.shelleyspector.com

Shelley Spector (born 1961) is an American visual artist. Spector is an adjunct professor at University of the Arts. and the Pennsylvania Academy of the Fine Arts. She currently lives and works in Philadelphia, Pennsylvania.

Spector graduated from Pennsylvania Academy of the Fine Arts in 1980. In 1994 she attained a Bachelor of Fine Arts from University of the Arts (Philadelphia).

== Work ==
Spector works in a variety of media, including wood, fabric, and everyday materials. She often describes her work as having an anthropological aspect. Between 1999 and 2006 she ran SPECTOR, a gallery for emerging artists.

== Public collections ==
Spector's work can be seen in a number of public collections, including:

- Philadelphia Museum of Art
- Pennsylvania Academy of the Fine Arts
- Philadelphia Museum of Jewish Art
