= Moreschi =

Moreschi is an Italian surname that may refer to the following:

- Alessandro Moreschi, the last of the castrati
- Gabriela Gonçalves Dias Moreschi (born 1994), Brazilian handballer
- Luigia Polzelli, born Luigia Moreschi (1760-1830), Joseph Haydn's mistress
- Sandra Moreschi (born 1946), Italian designer of Jewish ceremonial art
