= Sinsheim =

- Town
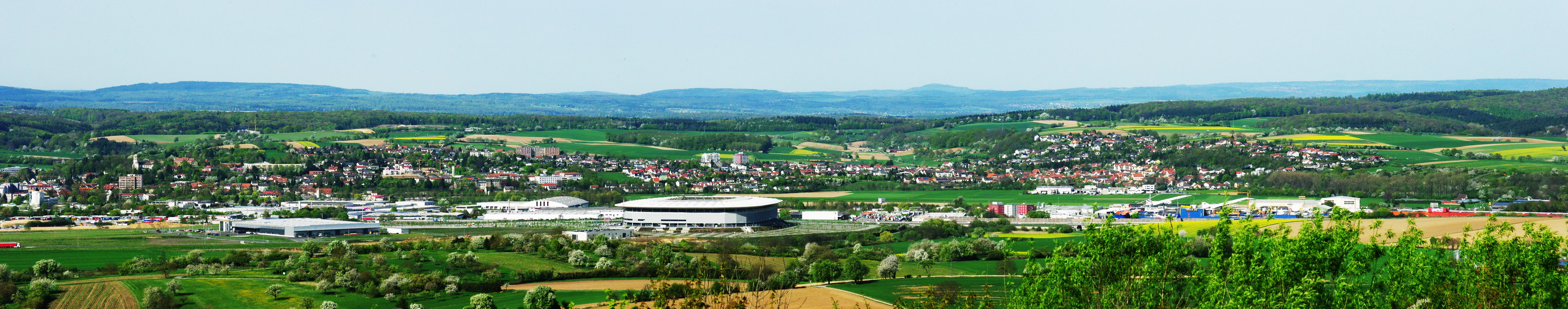
- Panoramic view

- Coat of arms

- Location of Sinsheim within Rhein-Neckar-Kreis district
- Interactive map of Sinsheim
- Location within Germany Location within Baden-Württemberg
- Coordinates: 49°15′N 08°53′E
- Country: Germany
- State: Baden-Württemberg
- Admin. region: Karlsruhe
- District: Rhein-Neckar-Kreis

Government
  - Mayor (2024–28): Marco Siesing (CDU)

Area
  - Total: 126.99 km^{2} (49.03 sq mi)
- Elevation: 154 m (505 ft)

Population (2025-12-31)
  - Total: 37,105
  - Density: 292.19/km^{2} (756.76/sq mi)
- Time zone: UTC+01:00 (CET)
  - Summer (DST): UTC+02:00 (CEST)
- Postal codes: 74871-74889
- Dialling codes: 07260, 07261, 07265, 07266, 07268
- Vehicle registration: HD
- Website: www.sinsheim.de

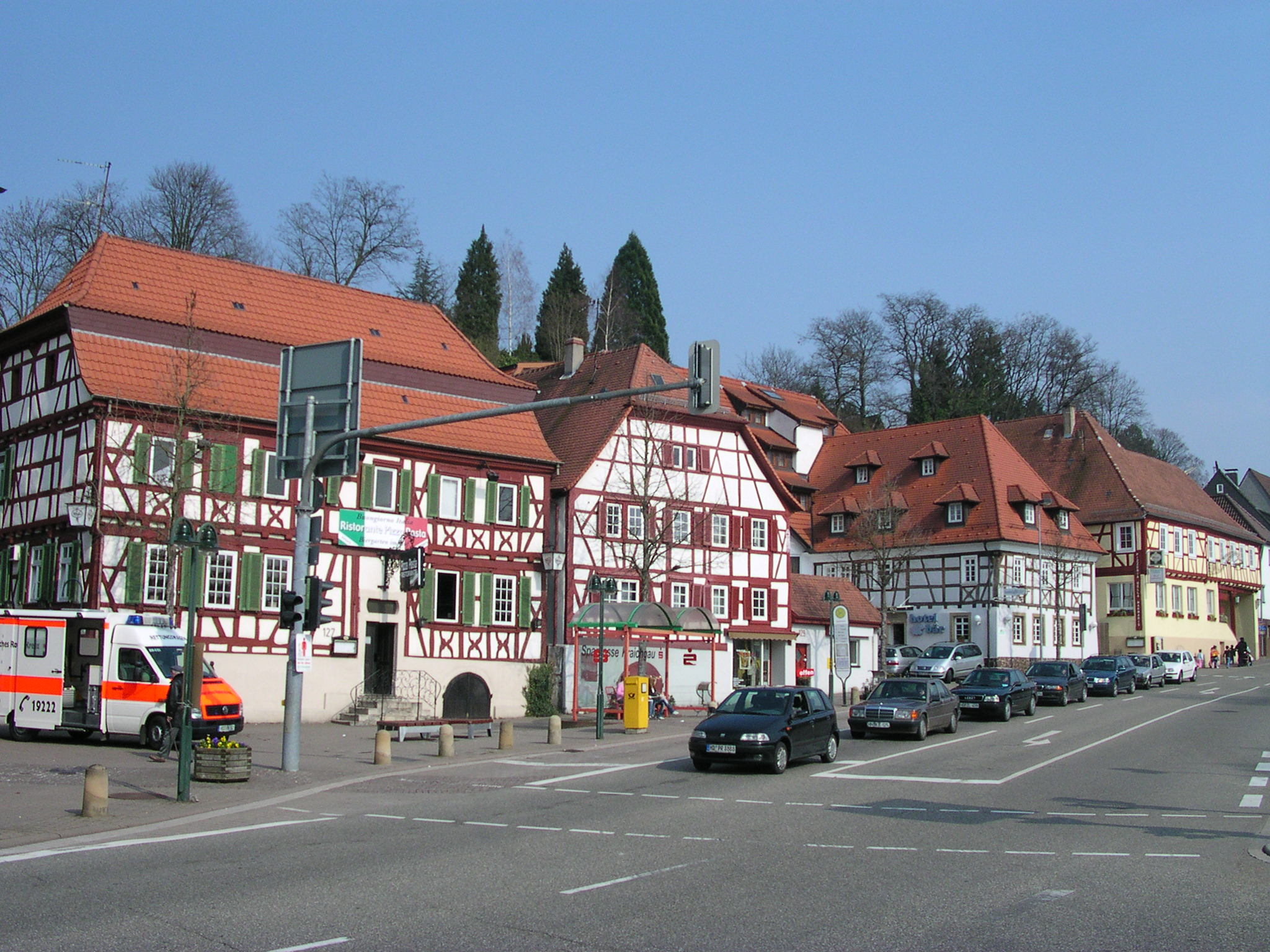
Historical buildings in the principal street

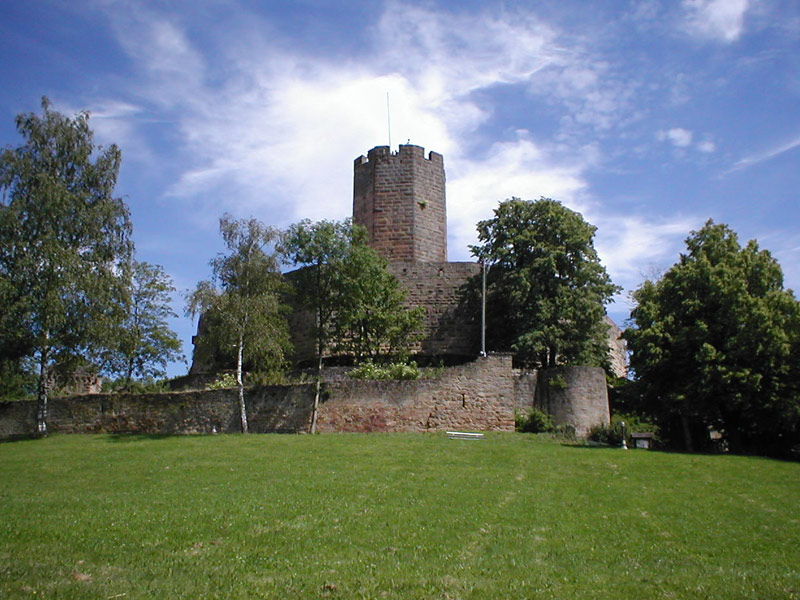
Burg Steinsberg

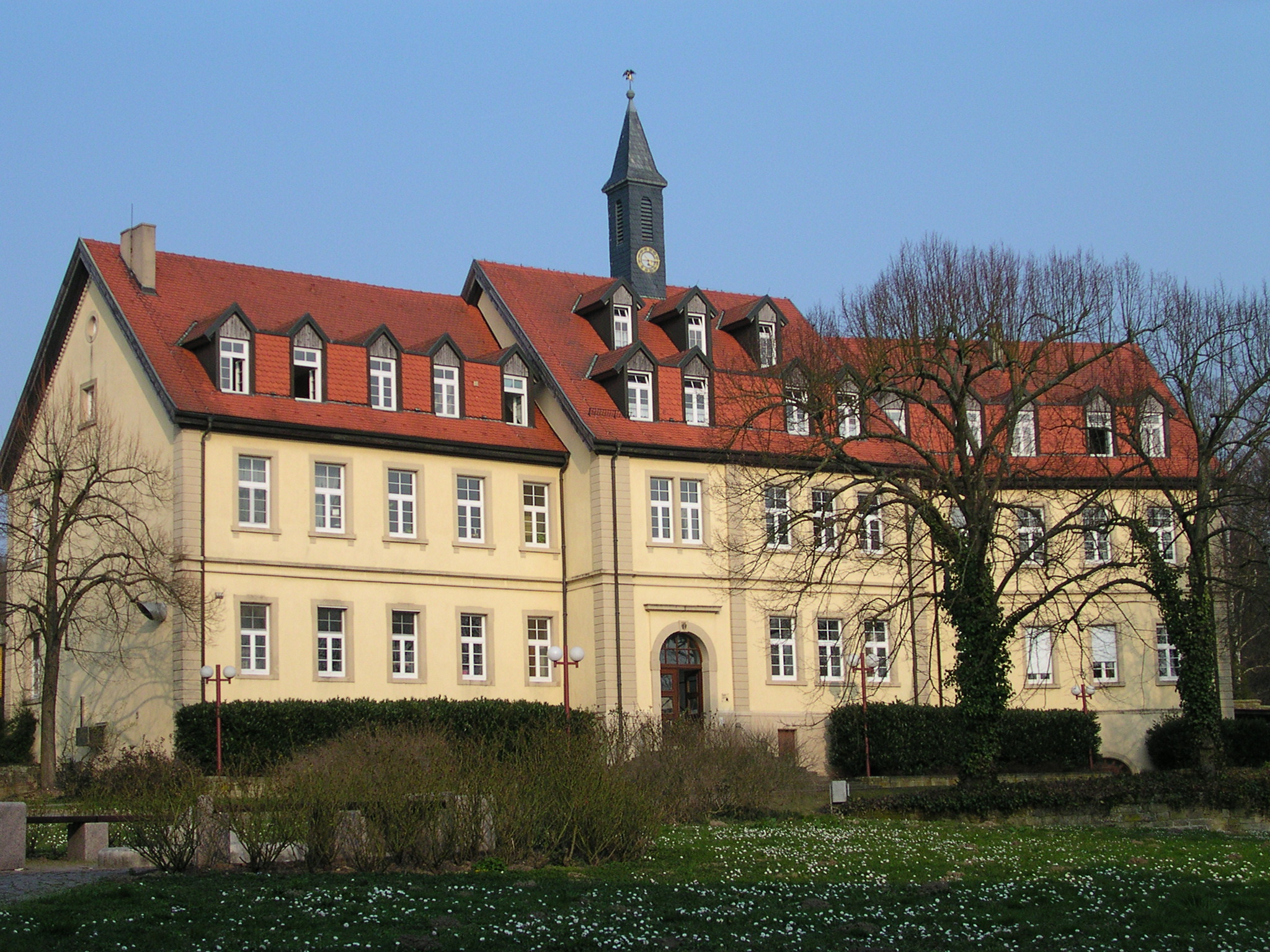
The monastery Stift Sunnisheim

Sinsheim (German pronunciation: [ˈzɪnshaɪm]; Palatine German: Sinse) is a town in southwestern Germany, in the Rhine Neckar Area of the state Baden-Württemberg about 22 kilometres (14 mi) southeast of Heidelberg and about 28 kilometres (17 mi) northwest of Heilbronn in the district Rhein-Neckar.

== Geography ==
=== Overview ===
Sinsheim consists of a town centre and 12 suburbs with a total population of 36,780 (as of March 2023). Its area encompasses 127 square kilometers (49 sq mi). The Elsenz, an unnavigable left-bank tributary of the Neckar, flows through the town, reaching the Neckar at Neckargemünd.

=== Subdivisions ===
The list below shows the 12 suburban villages (Stadtteile). Population data was as of 31 December 2020 and the one of Sinsheim (the town proper) was of 12,914.

Village	Population
Adersbach	626
Dühren	2,214
Ehrstädt	578
Eschelbach	2,222
Hasselbach	325
Hilsbach	2,323

Village	Population
Hoffenheim	3,310
Reihen	2,281
Rohrbach	2,209
Steinsfurt	3,312
Waldangelloch	1,661
Weiler	1,919

== History ==
The region around Sinsheim has been settled since 700,000 BC, as shown by the finding of the fossil Homo heidelbergensis in the village of Mauer, about 12 km (7 miles) north of Sinsheim. The Romans ruled the area from 90 AD to 260 AD. The city was possibly founded in about 550 AD by the Frankish nobleman Sunno. It was first historically mentioned in 770 AD in the Codex of the cloister Lorsch. Since 1192, the town had city rights, a privilege first granted by Henry IV, Holy Roman Emperor.

Sinsheim was affected by wars and poverty from the 1500s to the 1700s. Sinsheim-born revolutionary Franz Sigel became a famous Union general in the American Civil War.

The Elsenz Valley Railway and Sinsheim station were opened in 1868 and the nearby Steinsfurt–Eppingen line was opened in 1900; electricity and public water pipes were introduced into the city from 1910 on. The World Wars and the Great Depression kept Sinsheim from growing until the A6 Autobahn was built in 1968. It connected Sinsheim to national and international roads, with Mannheim, Stuttgart, Frankfurt am Main, Heilbronn, Heidelberg, Ludwigshafen all now within an hour by car. While traditionally being an agricultural town, the highway made it into a small industrial centre, but it has been hit by recession and international outsourcing in recent years.

== Demographics ==
The numbers are estimates, census results(¹) or official data of the statistical offices (only primary residences).

Year	Population
14th century	ca. 1,200
1705	823
1798	1,705
1852	2,854
1 December 1871	2,716
1 December 1880 ¹	2,990
1 December 1890 ¹	2,952
1 December 1900 ¹	3,011
1 December 1910 ¹	3,327
8 October 1919 ¹	3,184
16 June 1925 ¹	3,497
16 June 1933 ¹	3,767
17 May 1939 ¹	3,900

Year	Population
December 1945 ¹	4,101
13 September 1950 ¹	5,860
6 June 1961 ¹	6,532
27 May 1970 ¹	8,056
31 December 1975	25,373
31 December 1980	26,658
27 May 1987 ¹	27,454
31 December 1990	29,307
31 December 1995	32,828
31 December 2000	34,171
31 December 2005	35,524
31 December 2006	35,605
31 December 2011	35,373
31 December 2015	35,175
31 December 2021	36,177
31 March 2023	36,780

¹ census results

== Main sights ==
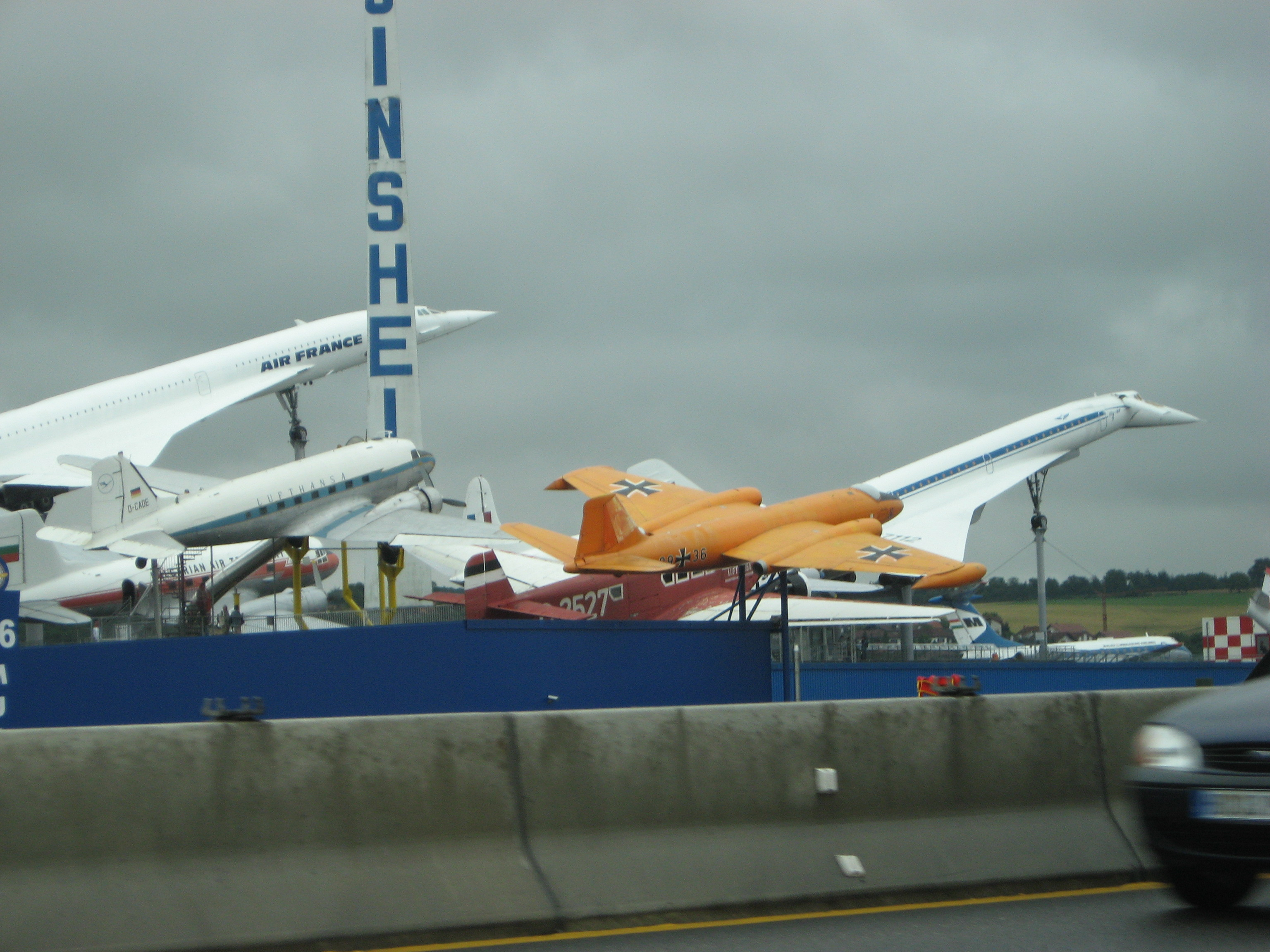
The Sinsheim Auto & Technik Museum, showing Concorde (left, background) and Tupolev Tu-144 (right, background) supersonic aircraft

Sinsheim's main tourist attraction is the Sinsheim Auto & Technik Museum situated in the suburb Steinsfurt, displaying a collection of historic vehicles to over 1 million visitors per year. In 1989, a trade fair area was established that features various industrial and popular events.

Additionally, Sinsheim has a medieval city core; the Altes Rathaus (old Town Hall) is a museum for the town and its role in the 1848 revolution. An old fortress, Burg Steinsberg in the village of Weiler, overlooks Sinsheim. With its octagonal tower, dating back to the 13th century, the fortress has sometimes been called the "compass" of the Kraichgau region, and nowadays contains a restaurant.

== Sport ==
=== Stadium ===
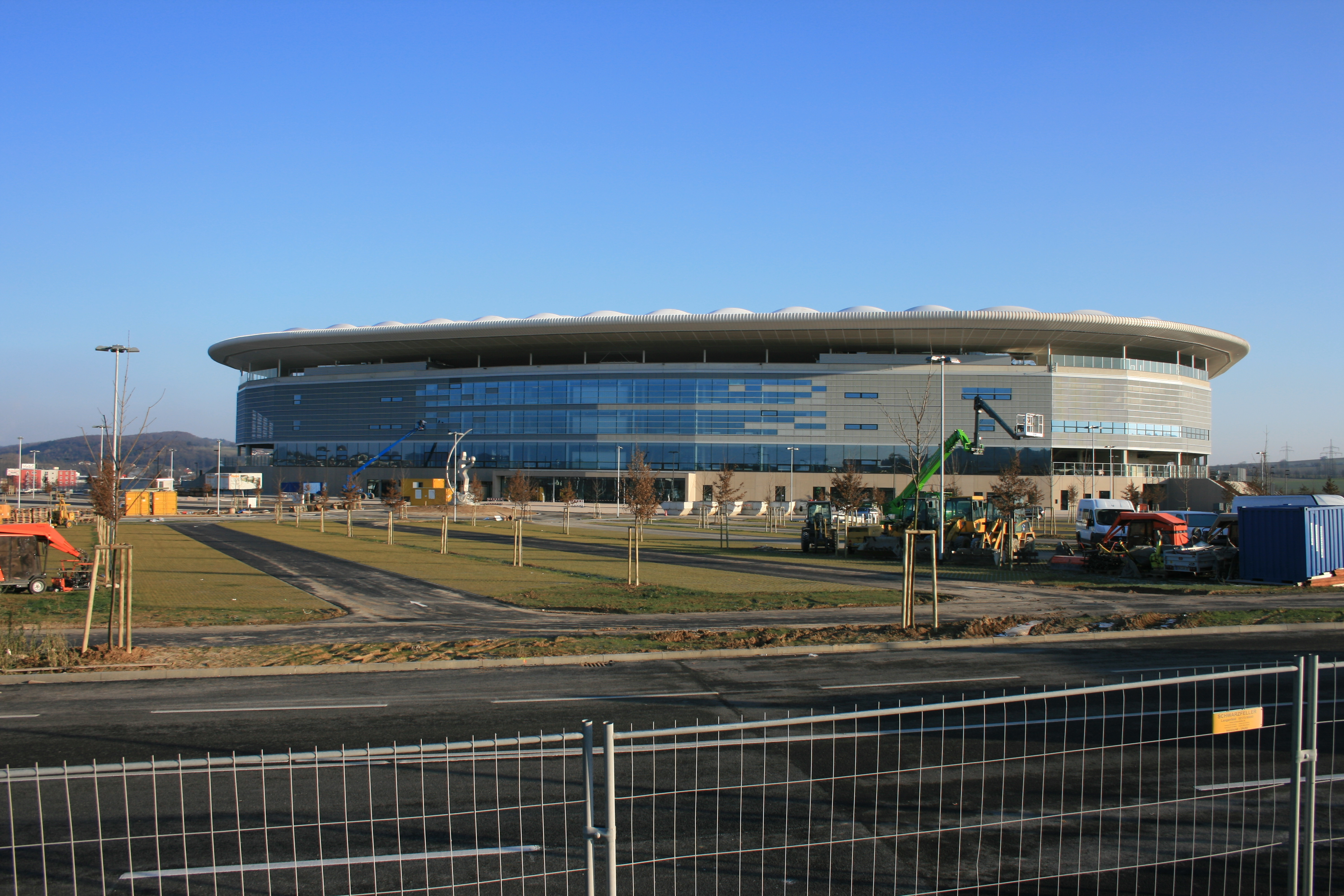
The Rhein-Neckar-Arena

On September 19, 2006, the mayor of Sinsheim announced a stadium would be built not far from the Sinsheim Auto & Technik Museum, for the town's most successful football club TSG 1899 Hoffenheim. Construction of the €100 million stadium, which seats 30,164, was funded by Dietmar Hopp, a co-founder and major share holder of software giant SAP and a former player in the youth system of TSG 1899 Hoffenheim. The club christened their new stadium "Rhein Neckar-Arena" on 31 January 2009 with a 2–0 win over Energie Cottbus.

== Twin towns – sister cities ==
Sinsheim is twinned with:

- Barcs, Hungary
- Longué-Jumelles, France

== People ==
- Franz Bachelin (1895–1980), German art director.
- Matto Barfuss (born 1970), artist, photographer, filmmaker environmentalist and author
- Wilhelm Bauer (1924–2013), local history researcher and honorary citizen of Sinsheim
- David Heinz Gumbel (1906–1992), Israeli designer and silversmith born in Sinsheim
- Walter Horn (1908–1995), German-American medievalist scholar
- August Karolus (1893–1972), professor and physicist who conducted fundamental research in television technology
- Volker Kauder (born 1949), German politician (CDU)
- Ulrich Lechte (born 1977), German politician (FDP)
- Emil Rupp (1898–1979), German physicist and imposter
- Carl Friedrich Schuster (1823–1891], German politician, lord mayor of Freiburg im Breisgau and member of the Reichstag
- Hans Seyffer (c.1460–1509), stone sculptor and wood carver
- Franz Sigel (1824–1902), U.S. Army General in the American Civil War.
- Roland Wester (born 1971), professor and physicist

=== Sport ===
- Christian Eichner (born 1982), football player and manager, played 230 games
- Matthias Krieger (born 1984), a paralympic judoka and bronze medallist at the 2012 Summer Paralympics.
- Sarai Linder (born 1999), footballer, played 12 games for the Germany women's national football team
- Andreas Müller (born 2000), footballer

=== Music ===
- Liquido (1996-2009), rock band
