= David Roytman Luxury Judaica =

David Roytman Inc.
- Company type: Private
- Industry: Manufacturing, Fashion design
- Founded: 2015
- Founder: David Roytman
- Headquarters: New York City, U.S.
- Products: Luxury Judaica
- Owner: David Roytman
- Number of employees: >100
- Website: https://davidroytman.com/

David Roytman Luxury Judaica is a manufacturing company established in 2015, specializing in luxury Judaica.

Production specializes Judaica such as kippahs, mezuzah cases, ketubah cases, and bags for a tallit and tefillin set. Also such fashion accessories as cufflinks, belts and pendants engraved with Jewish symbols. The company also designs individual monograms.

While the company is incorporated in New York, design and manufacturing take place in Odesa, Ukraine. The company has outlet stores in major cities around the world, like Jerusalem, London, Moscow, New York, Odesa, Paris, St. Petersburg, Vienna and Vilnius.

Kippahs and other products are made from such exotic materials as crocodile leather, ostrich leather, python skin and stingray leather. Laser engraving is used to apply the company logo, which is based on the initials of its Odesa-born Israeli owner, David Roytman. A David Roytman Luxury Judaica kippah can cost over $1,000.

Famous people owning David Roytman Luxury Judaica kippas are United States president Donald Trump, Israeli prime minister Benjamin Netanyahu and Ukrainian prime minister Volodymyr Groysman .

In 2018 the company installed a 2 metres (6 ft 7 in) high mezuzah is the tallest mezuzah in the world, made of LED screens, on the roof of the Aish HaTorah yeshiva building in the Old City of Jerusalem, as a publicity stunt.

== See also ==
- Jewish ceremonial art
