= Emanuel Gerechter =

German-American rabbi and teacher

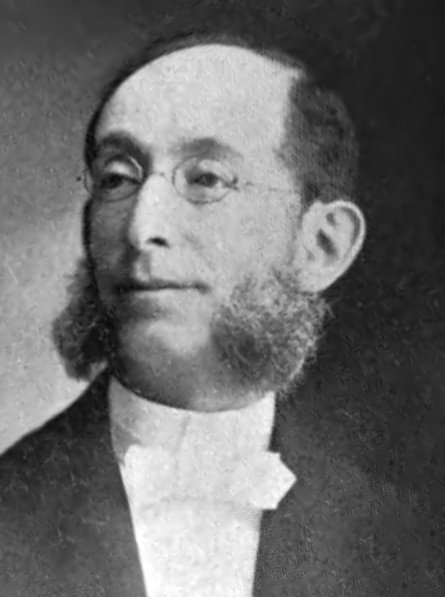

Emanuel Gerechter (November 15, 1842 – October 13, 1926) was a German-American rabbi and teacher who mainly ministered in Wisconsin.

== Life ==
Gerechter was born on November 15, 1842, in Borek, Grand Duchy of Posen, Prussia, the son of Louis Gerechter and Auguste Kramer.

In 1846, Gerechter moved with his family to Lissa, where his father was principal of a school. He attended the public school and gymnasium there. In 1859, he became a student at the Jewish Theological Seminary of Breslau. While studying there, he passed state examinations and began teaching in 1860. He graduated in 1862, after which he spent two years working as a public school teacher in Grätz. He then spent another two years working as a teacher and preacher in Kempen. He immigrated to America in 1866 and became rabbi of B'nai Maminim in New York City, New York. He served as rabbi there until 1871, when he was named rabbi of Temple Beth El in Detroit, Michigan. In 1874, he went to Grand Rapids, Michigan, where he was rabbi of Temple Emanuel and a German teacher in the Central High School. In 1880, he became rabbi of Congregation B'ne Jeshurun in Milwaukee, Wisconsin, and served as superintendent of the congregation's Sunday school.

In 1892, Gerechter was named rabbi of Temple Zion in Appleton. Starting in 1894 he also worked as Professor of Hebrew and German Literature in Lawrence University as well as head of its German Department. He retired as Professor in 1913 and received a retiring allowance from the Carnegie Foundation. He retired as rabbi in 1919, at which point he moved to New York City.

In 1869, Gerechter married Lina Spieldach. They had eight children, all of whom died young.

Gerechter died at his nephew Gabriel Davidson's home in New York City on October 13, 1926. His body was sent back to Appleton, where he was buried at Zion Cemetery.
