= David Heinz Gumbel =

Israeli designer and silversmith

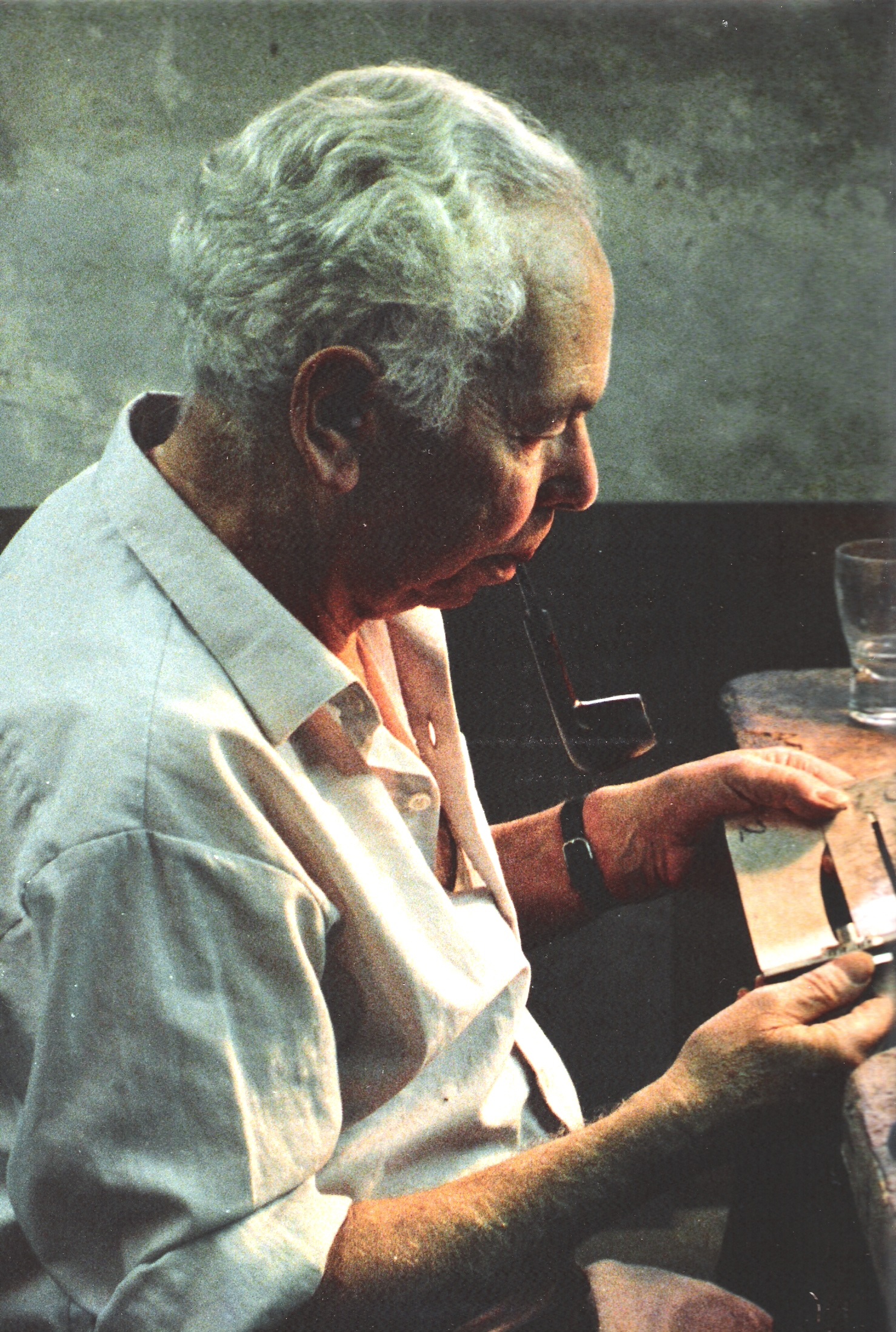
David Heinz Gumbel in his studio

David Heinz Gumbel (Hebrew: דוד היינץ גומבל; 1906–1992) was an Israeli designer and silversmith, born in Germany.

== Biography ==
David Heinz Gumbel (given name was Detlev Heinz. He was born in Sinsheim, Germany to a secular family among the pioneers of the local silversmith industry. In 1918, the Gumbels relocated to Heilbronn where David worked as an apprentice in the "Bruckmann & Sons" factory, becoming a certified steel engraver.

In the late 1920s, Gumbel studied to be a silversmith at the school of applied arts in Berlin at the Kunstgewerbeschule. Following his studies, Gumbel was employed at workshops in Düsseldorf and Stockholm, as well as in the family factory in Heilbronn. It was there that Gumbel began to design hand-made silver pieces in the modern style. Simultaneously, he produced Jewish ritual objects like a Chanukah menorah or candlesticks. Gumbel utilized polished silver and other materials, such as ivory, in his works.

In 1936, Gumbel left Germany for Land of Israel, joining the Bezalel Academy of Arts and Design as a teacher and the administrator of the metal department, alongside Ludwig Yehuda Wolpert. Once in the Land of Israel, Gumbel began to work with typography, ostensibly as a result of Wolpert's influence.

Despite Gumbel's modern approach to design, he continued to work with and teach the traditional methods of manual manufacturing, such as repoussé. In the early 1940s, he opened an independent workshop where he produced metal works and Judaica pieces in said silversmith techniques.

Gumbel retired from his work at Bezalel in 1955. In his will Gumbel left the continuation of his creation to the artist Malka Cohavi, his assistant and teacher at Bezalel Academy of Art and Design.

Some of his most notable works: Candlestick of three arms (1930), Silver pouch for Declaration of Independence scroll (1949), Mezuzah case (1960), Etrog box (1975), Mezuza for the Supreme Court (1992), Early Modern Era silver Hanukkah Lamp (1950) and more.

== Education ==
- Apprentice at the "Bruckmann & Sons", Heilbronn, Germany
- 1927 Silversmithing, Kunstgewerbeschule, Berlin

== Teaching ==
- 1936-1956 The Metal Department, New Bezalel, Jerusalem

== Bibliography ==
- Sharon Weiser-Ferguson, Forging Ahead: Wolpert and Gumbel, Israeli Silversmiths for the Modern Age, Israel Museum, Jerusalem, 2012
