= Sandra Moreschi =

Italian designer

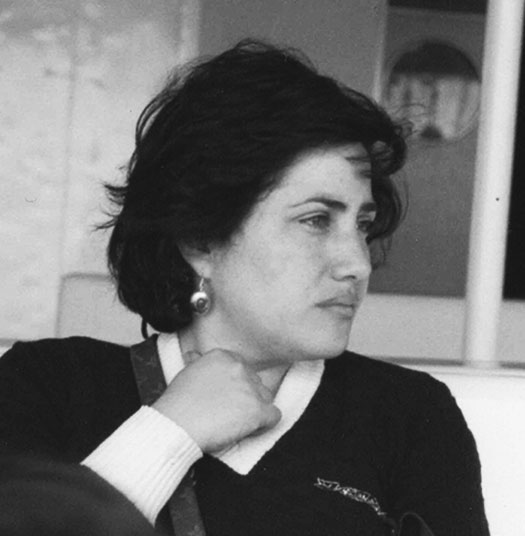
Sandra Moreschi in a photographic portrait

Sandra Moreschi (born December 7, 1946) is an Italian designer of Jewish ceremonial art.

Since the end of the 1980s, Sandra Moreschi has been combining symbols of the Jewish tradition with contemporary design. From 1990 to 2016 she managed a store, Saray, located in the heart of the Roman Ghetto in via Portico d'Ottavia. During this time, she collaborated with Italian artisan shops, among them the Bottega Gatti of Faenza. Her works are present in important private, museum and institutional collections.
