= Bernhard Friedländer =

Bernhard Friedländer (1880–1941) was a Polish-born Jewish goldsmith, silversmith and stone setter. He is known for his Judaica, and he founded the company Michsaf.

== His life ==
Bernhard Friedländer was born in 1880, in Czenstochau, (present-day Poland).

He completed his training as a goldsmith and silversmith and stone setter in Lodz, Odessa, Tbilisi and Berlin. He worked in Germany from 1904 to 1927, with stops in Berlin, Munich, Essen and Bonn. He founded his company in Düsseldorf in 1914 and developed unique Judaica for synagogues and the home. His works were successful: in exhibitions such as the GeSoLei in Düsseldorf in 1926, in the US in 1928 and at the Kult- und Form exhibition in various cities from 1930. His artistic development in Düsseldorf, which he continued until 1927, was the most productive of his career. He moved to Antwerp in 1927 before moving to Mandate Palestine in 1932. There, in addition to exceptional Hannukiah, he mainly created Judaica and silverware in multiple versions.

He died in 1941, in Tel Aviv.

== Works ==
Most of Friedländer's work was destroyed during the Nazi era. He produced candlesticks, Hanukkah lights, Kiddush and silverware in Tel Aviv, which are less artistically sophisticated and less unusual. He founded the company Michsaf, but sold it during his lifetime.

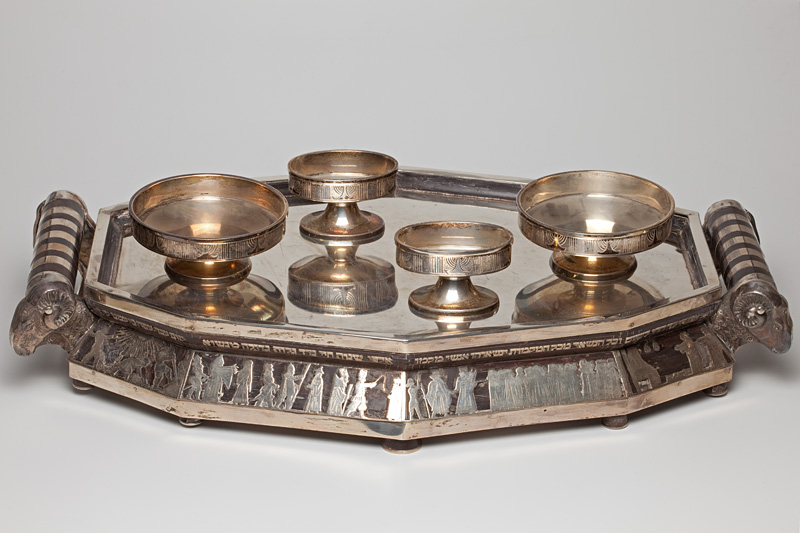
Seder centrepiece (1913–1926), made in Düsseldorf and in the collection of the Jewish Museum of Switzerland, Basel.

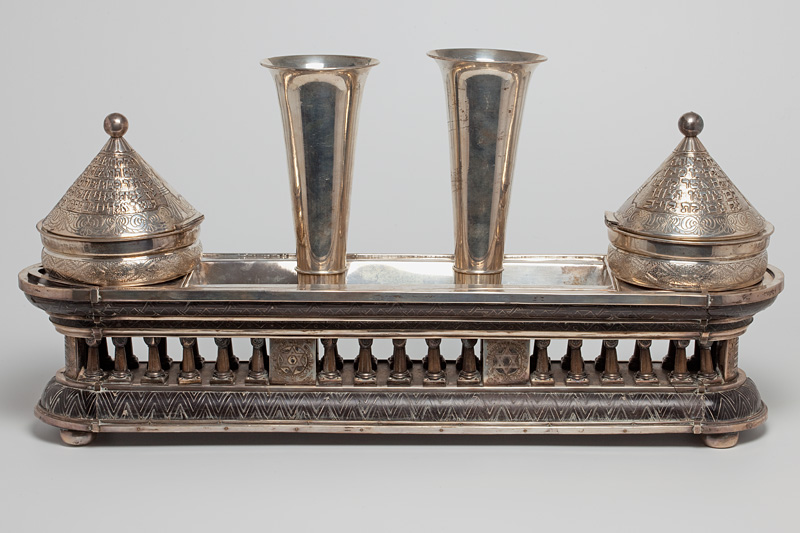
Lulav and Etrog holder (1925–1940) made in Düsseldorf or Tel Aviv and is in the collection of the Jewish Museum of Switzerland, Basel.
