= John Hays (sheriff) =

John Hays (1770 – after 1822) is the only Jew known to have come to Illinois prior to its admission in the Union (August 26, 1818). He was the son of Baruch Hays, a lieutenant in the American Revolution and scion of one of the oldest American Jewish families. John Hays settled in Illinois as early as 1793 and served for twenty years as sheriff of St. Clair County, in the southwestern part of Illinois, which was the most populous section of the state in its early days.

Hays was born in New York City in 1770. At a young age, he entered the Indian trade in the Northwest as clerk to a wealthy house in Canada.

He settled in Cahokia, Illinois in 1793, where he embarked on trade with the Indians on his own account. He later became a farmer.

For a number of years, Hays held the unpaid office of postmaster at Cahokia. In 1798, he was appointed sheriff of St. Clair County and he continued to exercise the duties of this position until 1818, when the Illinois state government was organized. In 1814, President Madison appointed him collector of internal revenue for the Illinois territory.

In 1822 he was stationed at Fort Wayne, Indiana, where he acted as Indian agent for the Potawatomi and Miami tribes. Afterwards, he returned to Cahokia, where he remained until his death.

== Sources ==
Hyman L. Meites (ed.), History of the Jews of Chicago, Chicago Jewish Historical Society. 1924. (Facsimile ed. 1990). Quotes extensively from History of St. Clair County, Brink, McDonough and Co.. 1881.
