= Charles S. Levi =

English-American rabbi

Charles Sampson Levi (May 20, 1868 – January 17, 1939) was an English-American rabbi.

== Life ==
Levi was born on May 20, 1868, in London, England, the son of Sampson Levi and Carrie Green. He immigrated to America in around 1872.

Levi attended grammar and high school in Cincinnati, Ohio. He then went to the University of Cincinnati (where he received a B.A.) and Hebrew Union College (where he was ordained a rabbi in 1889. From 1889 to 1898, he was Associate Rabbi of B'nai Yeshurun, Assistant Professor of Rabbinica at Hebrew Union College, and the secretary and yearbook editor and compiler of the Central Conference of American Rabbis (CCAR).

In 1898, Levi became rabbi of Congregation Anshai Emeth in Peoria, Illinois. He served as rabbi there until 1912. While in Peoria, he was treasurer of the CCAR from 1901 to 1906 and a member of its executive board from 1907 to 1910, co-author of "Course of Studies Primary, High and Normal Depts. (Sabbath School Union of America)" in 1900, and a contributor to the Union Prayer Book in 1902 and the Union Hymnal in 1910. In 1913, he was named rabbi of Congregation B’ne Jeshurun in Milwaukee, Wisconsin.

Levi was a member of the Hebrew Union College Board of Governors from 1904 to 1922, a member of the Peoria Board of Education from 1908 to 1910, and a director of Milwaukee's Mount Sinai Hospital from 1913 to 1927. In 1928, he was a Union of American Hebrew Congregations delegate to the Congress of Liberal Judaism in Berlin, Germany. In that year, he also retired as rabbi of B'ne Jeshurun.

Levi died in Milwaukee on January 17, 1939. He was buried in Walnut Hills Jewish Cemetery.
