= Jewish ceremonial art =

Array of objects used by Jews for ritual purposes

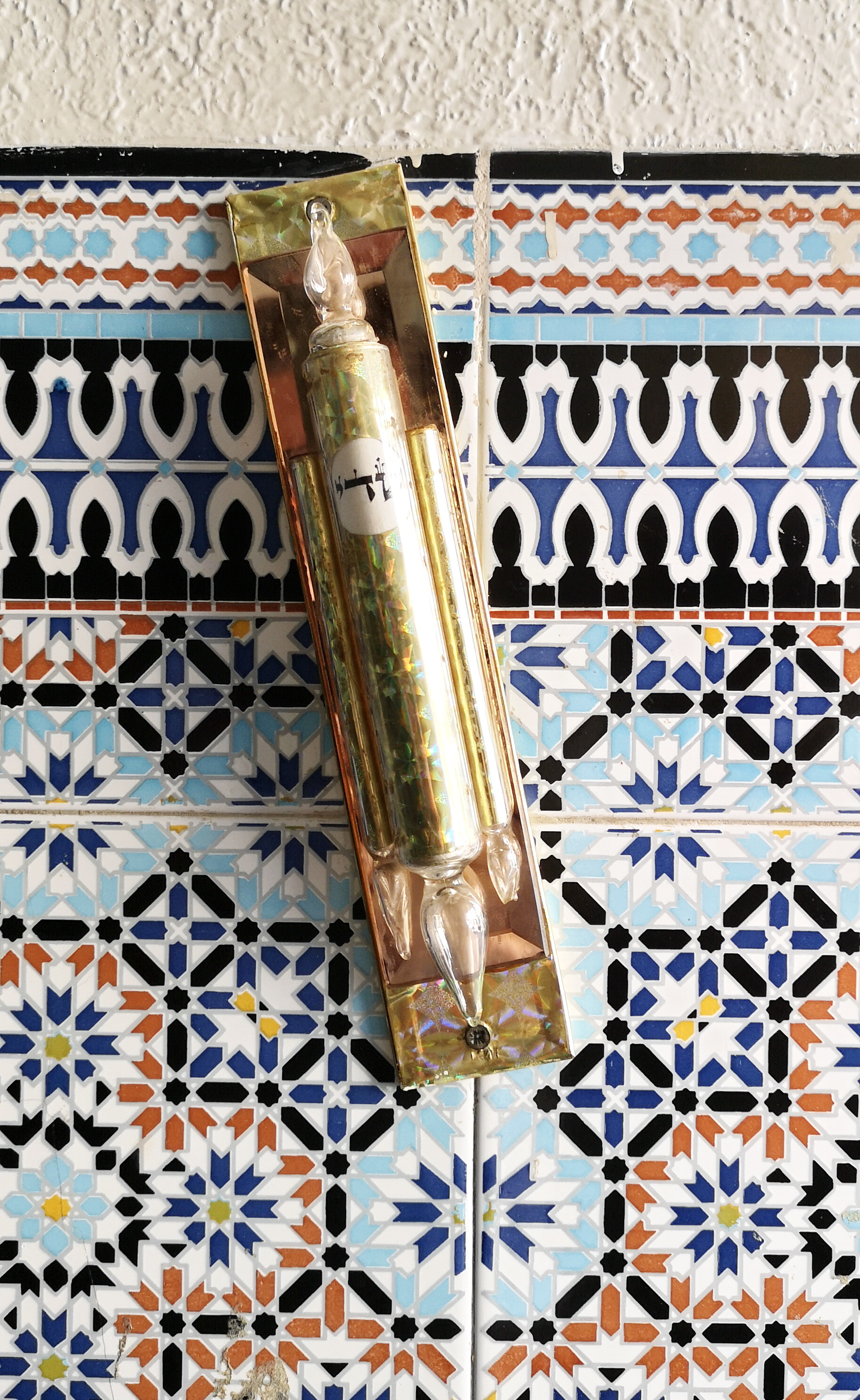
Mezuzah

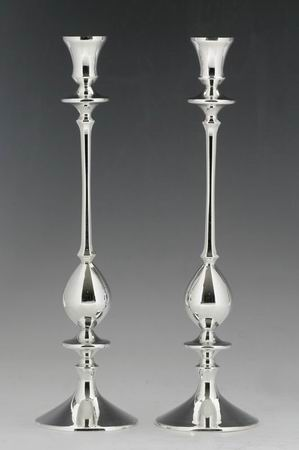
Silver Shabbat candlesticks

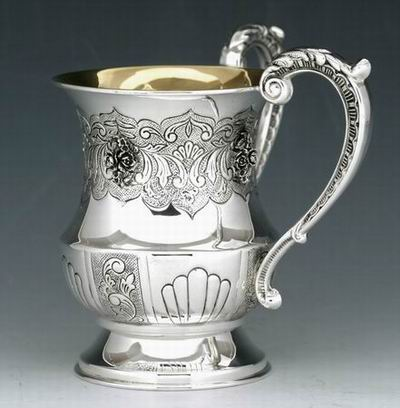
Silver handwashing cup

Jewish ceremonial art, also referred to as Jewish ritual art, Jewish sacred art, and Jewish liturgical art, refers to objects used by Jews for ritual purposes. Because enhancing a mitzvah by performing it with an especially beautiful object is considered a mitzvah – a praiseworthy way of honoring God's commandments – this concept is known as hiddur mitzvah. Judaism has a long tradition of commissioning ritual objects from craftsmen and artists, just as Jewish culture has a long tradition of producing ritual objects, both for Jewish ceremonial use and sale to all.

Jewish ceremonial art forms a large part of Judaica (/dʒuːˈdeɪ.ɪkə/), a general academic and art trade term for Jewish-related objects, of which other types are manuscripts, books and other printed materials, artworks in various media, and clothing.

== Textual origin ==
Multiple early rabbinic commentaries on the Hebrew Bible refer to sanctifying rituals with visually pleasing objects in the Midrash. Midrash Mekhilta of Rabbi Ishmael has this teaching on a biblical verse:

"This is my God and I will glorify Him" (Exodus 15:2)
Is it possible for a human being to add glory to his Creator? What this really means is: I shall glorify God in the way that I perform commandments. I shall prepare a beautiful lulav, beautiful sukkah, beautiful fringes (tzitzit), and beautiful tefillin.

Other Midrash teachings (e.g. Shir HaShirim Rabbah 1.15) offer the same idea. This idea is expanded upon in the Babylonian Talmud (e.g. Bāḇā Qammā 9b). This teaching was understood by succeeding generations as a duty, when possible, to make beautiful items used in Jewish life and worship, both physical and textual.

== Items used on Shabbat ==
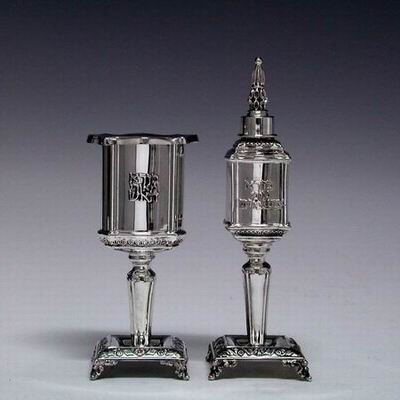
Havdalah candle holder and spice box

The following items are used during Shabbat:

- Kiddush cup: Kiddush, literally, "sanctification", is a blessing recited over wine or grape juice to sanctify the Shabbat and Jewish holidays. Kiddush cups are highly decorated, and are generally made of china, porcelain, silver, pewter or nickel.
- Shabbat candlestick holders
- Hand washing cup ("netilat yadayim")
- Challah cutting board and cover
- Havdalah candle and candle holder
- Havdalah spice box

The end of the Jewish Shabbat is marked by the brief prayer ceremony of Havdalah, which usually takes place in the home. Part of the ceremony requires sniffing a sweet-smelling spice or plant. In Jewish communities around the Mediterranean, a sprig of a sweet-smelling shrub was customarily used; in Northern Europe, by the twelfth century there are literary references of the use of a specially designed spice box or container. The oldest surviving spice boxes for Havdalah date to the mid-sixteenth century. The Jewish Museum (New York) has a German example c. 1550 thought to originate in Frankfurt am Main.

== Hanukkah items ==
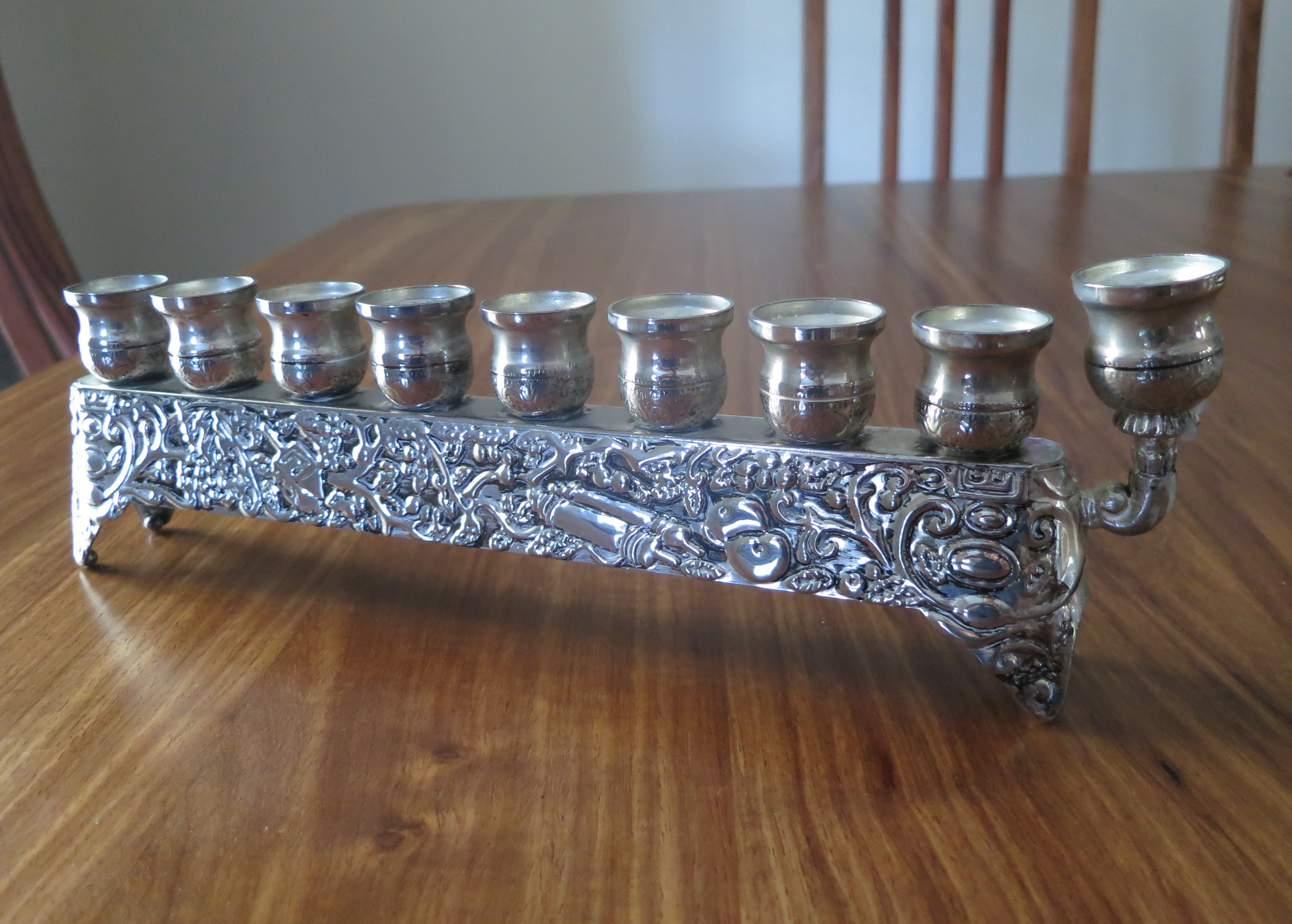
Silver Hanukkah Menorah

The menorah (or hanukkiah) used on the Jewish holiday of Hanukkah is perhaps the most widely produced article of Jewish ceremonial art. The Lindo lamp is a particularly fine example by an 18th-century silversmith. Contemporary artists often design menorahs, such as the gold-plated brass menorah with 35 moveable branches designed by Yaacov Agam. A silver menorah by Ze'ev Raban from the 1930s is in the Judaica Collection of the North Carolina Museum of Art.

- Chanukah menorah
- Dreidels
- Gelt holder
- Chanukah candles or Oil

== Sukkot items ==
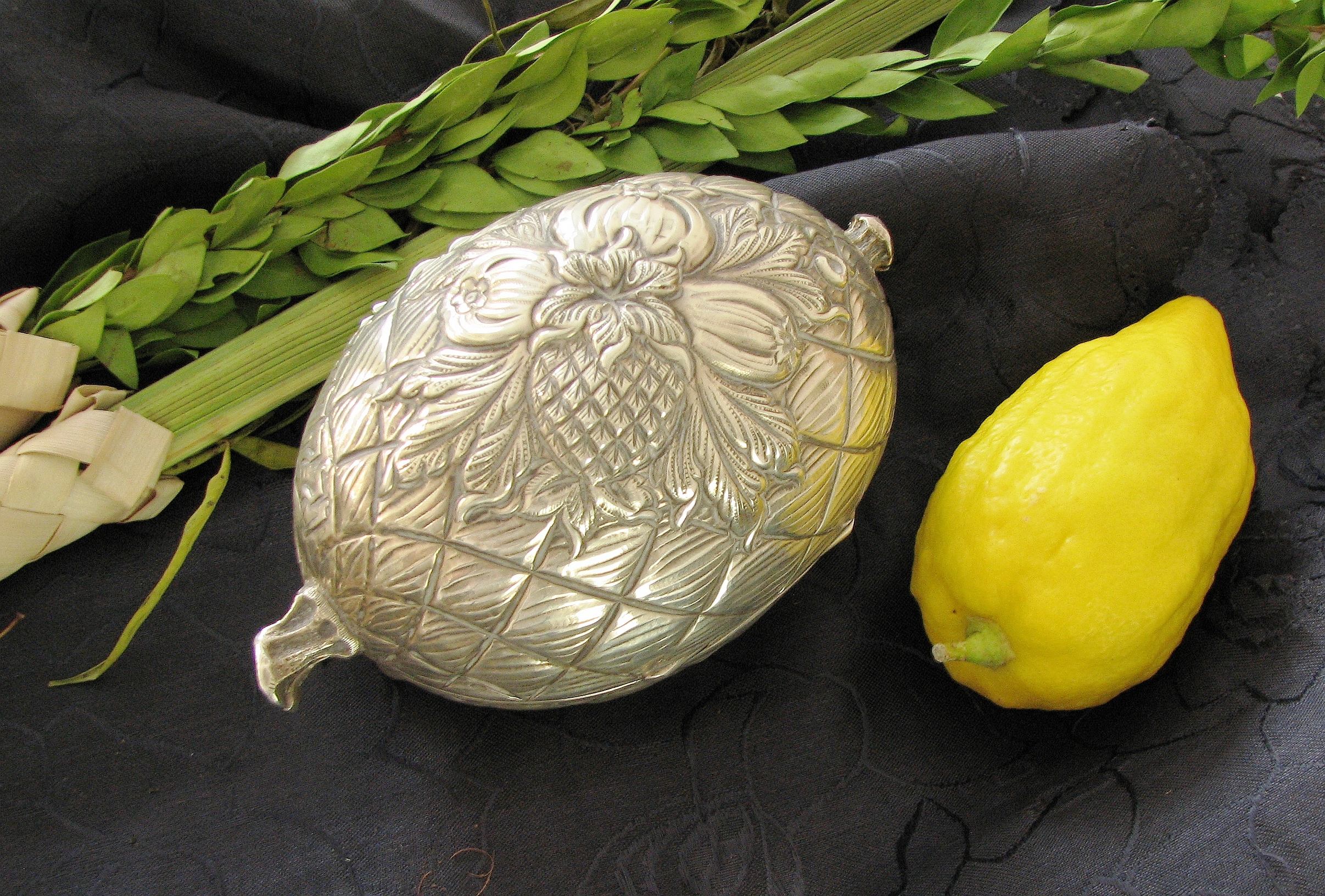
Silver etrog box

- Etrog Box: To protect the etrog during the Sukkot holiday, it is traditionally wrapped in silky flax fibers and stored in a special box, often made from silver. In modern times, the etrog is also commonly wrapped in synthetic netting, and placed in cardboard boxes. Wooden boxes are increasingly popular as well.
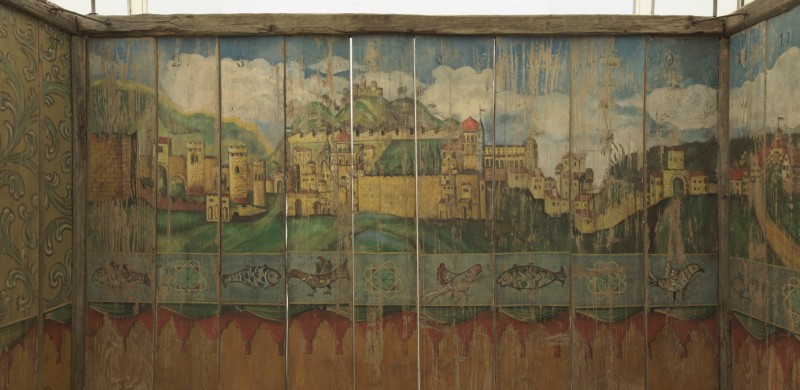
- 19th century sukkah from Austria with a painting of Jerusalem - Musée d'Art et d'Histoire du Judaïsme
  Sukkah decorations: There is a custom to decorate the sukkah during the festival of Sukkot with various ornaments. Some communities hang fruits and decorative objects from the s’chach, although this practice raises certain halakhic questions concerning the required height of the s’chach and the use of ritual objects. In addition, it is common to adorn the walls of the sukkah with drawings and images related to the holiday.

== Passover items ==
=== Haggadah ===
The tradition of artistically embellished haggadahs, the Jewish text that sets forth the order of the Passover Seder, dates back to the Middle Ages. The Sarajevo Haggadah of 1350 is a celebrated example. Major contemporary artists have produced notable haggadahs, such as the Szyk Hagaddah. See also the facsimile edition of the even earlier Barcelona Haggadah of 1340.

=== Seder plate ===
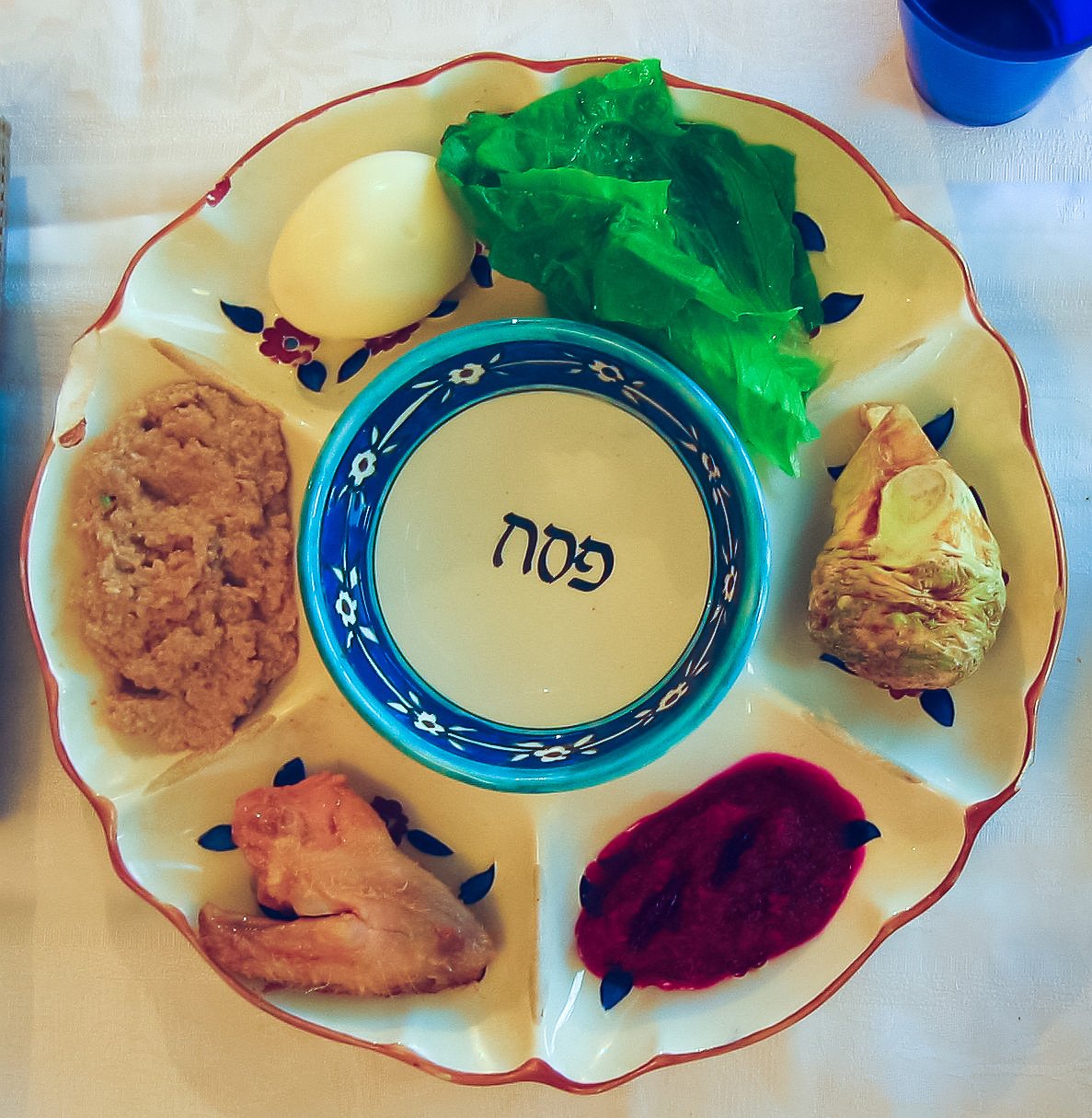
Ceramic seder plate

The Passover Seder plate is a special plate containing the six symbolic foods displayed at the Passover Seder: the Maror and Chazeret (bitter herbs), the Zeroa (a roasted shank bone, typically lamb), the Beitza (a hard-boiled egg), the Karpas (a green vegetable, typically parsley), and the Charoset (a paste of fruit, nuts, spices, and wine). Seder plates may come in a set with a matching dish for the three whole matzot used during the seder. These dishes can be intricately decorated and often come with dedicated spaces for each specific food.

== Notable Judaica collections ==
Museums with notable collections of Jewish ceremonial art include the British Library, the Israel Museum, the Jewish Museum (London), the Musée d'Art et d'Histoire du Judaïsme in Paris, the Jewish Museum in Prague, the North Carolina Museum of Art, the Jewish Museum (New York), the Musée Lorrain in Nancy, the Musée alsacien in Strasbourg and the Contemporary Jewish Museum of San Francisco. The Museum of Jewish Heritage in New York City also holds a sizable collection. Significant private collections include the Gross Family Collection.

Another way to see Judaica is through the art marketplace, including auction houses. Sotheby's, Bonhams-New York, Skinner's and Kestenbaums routinely hold regular auctions each year.

== Notable creators of Judaica ==
- Maurice Ascalon (1913–2003) American sculptor
- Bernard Bernstein (1928–2021) American metalsmith
- Bernhard Friedländer (1880–1941) Polish goldsmith, silversmith and stone setter
- Ina Golub (1938–2015) American fiber artist
- Yaacov Heller (born 1941) American-born Israeli sculptor and jewelry designer
- Tobi Kahn (born 1952) American sculptor
- Kurt Matzdorf (1922–2008) German-born American jewelry designer, metalsmith, and teacher
- Sandra Moreschi (born 1946) Italian designer
- Sam Philipe, Israeli sculptor
- Joel Arthur Rosenthal (born 1943) American jeweler
- Sari Srulovitch (born 1964) Israeli silversmith and jeweler

== See also ==
- Judaic Digital Library
- Religious art
- Mizrach, object indicating the direction of prayer
- Parochet, curtain of the Torah Ark
- Shiviti, meditative text
- David Roytman Luxury Judaica, manufacturing company
