= Shiviti =

Kabbalistic meditation aid

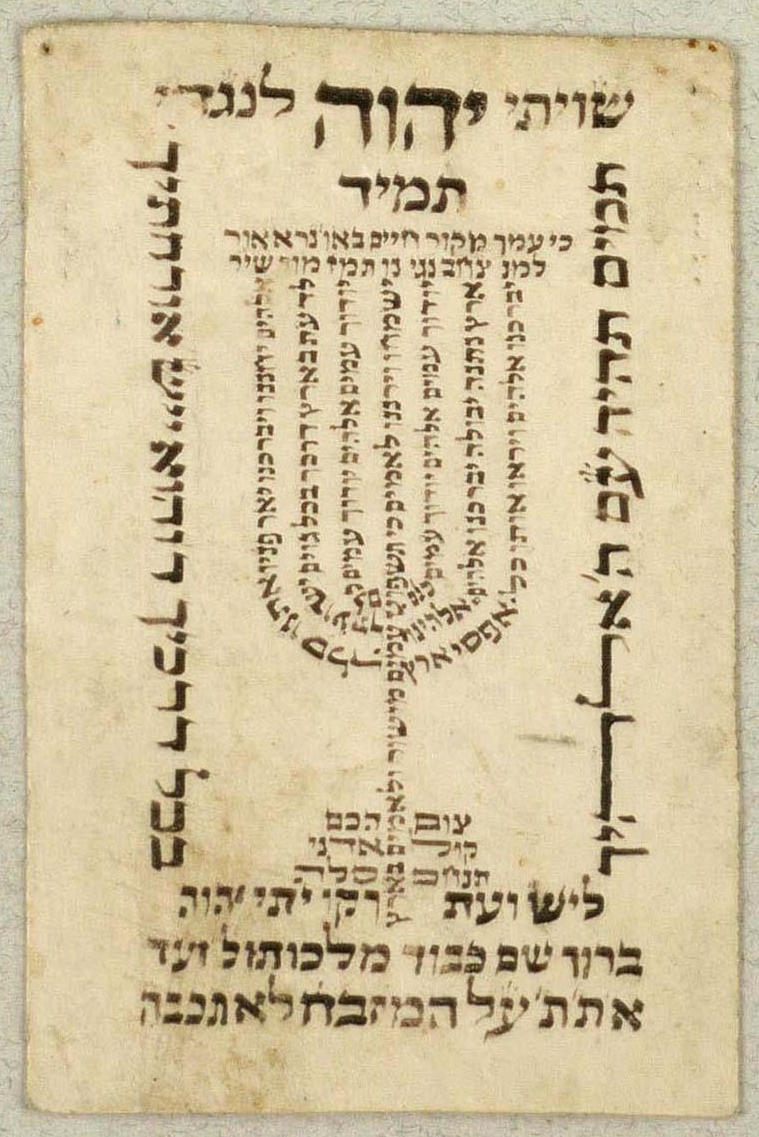
Shiviti with Hebrew text in the form of a menorah

A shiviti or shivisi (Hebrew: שויתי) is a type of mystical meditation aid. It is crowned at the top by Psalm 16:8, including the sacred name of God in the center, followed by Psalm 67 set in the shape of the Temple lampstand. It is used in Kabbalah for contemplation of the Tetragrammaton. One type of shiviti is placed at the front of the synagogue, where it may also serve as a type of mizrah; another popular format, designed for personal use, fits inside a prayerbook.

Shivitis originated in the 17th-century Sabbatean movement and were condemned by the mainstream rabbinate, especially by prominent anti-Sabbateans like Jacob Joshua Falk. Even in the nineteenth century, when the Sabbatean movement had died out, most authorities banned the use of shivitis because they were seen as disrespectful to the name of God. Today, shivitis are mostly seen in Hasidic synagogues.

== Etymology ==
Shiviti is the first word in the Hebrew text of Psalms 16:8, meaning "I have placed".

== History ==
Shimon Hasida (3rd century) explained that Psalms 16:8 urges one to pray with consciousness of God. Moses Isserles (d.1572) expanded,

"I have set the Lord before me constantly"; this is a major principle in the Torah and amongst the virtues of the righteous who walk before God. For a person's way of sitting, his movements and his dealings while he is alone in his house are not like his way of sitting, his movements and his dealings when he is before a great king; nor are his speech and free expression as much as he wants when he is with his household members and his relatives like his speech when in a royal audience.

Hayyim Vital (d.1620) added, citing Isaac Luria (d.1572),

There is also a sign to remind man of his sin: He traces the tetragrammaton in his imagination in ktav ashuri. For this is the secret of "I have set the Lord before me constantly". And when he traces it, if he has sinned in a way which relates to one of the letters, he will not be able to trace it, and by this will know that he has sinned.

Yechiel Michel b. Avraham Epstein Ashkenazi, a popular Sabbatean halakhist, was the first to record a practice of physically writing the name, in 1692:

The Qabbalistic masters write in their books that one can purify the mind by constantly tracing the tetragrammaton in their mind, as if it was written in black ink upon white paper . . . There are many who write the tetragrammaton upon parchment with the vowels of yir'ah (fear) and place it before them when praying, following the instruction to "set the Lord before me constantly". And this brings a man's heart to fear God, and it earns him a pure soul.

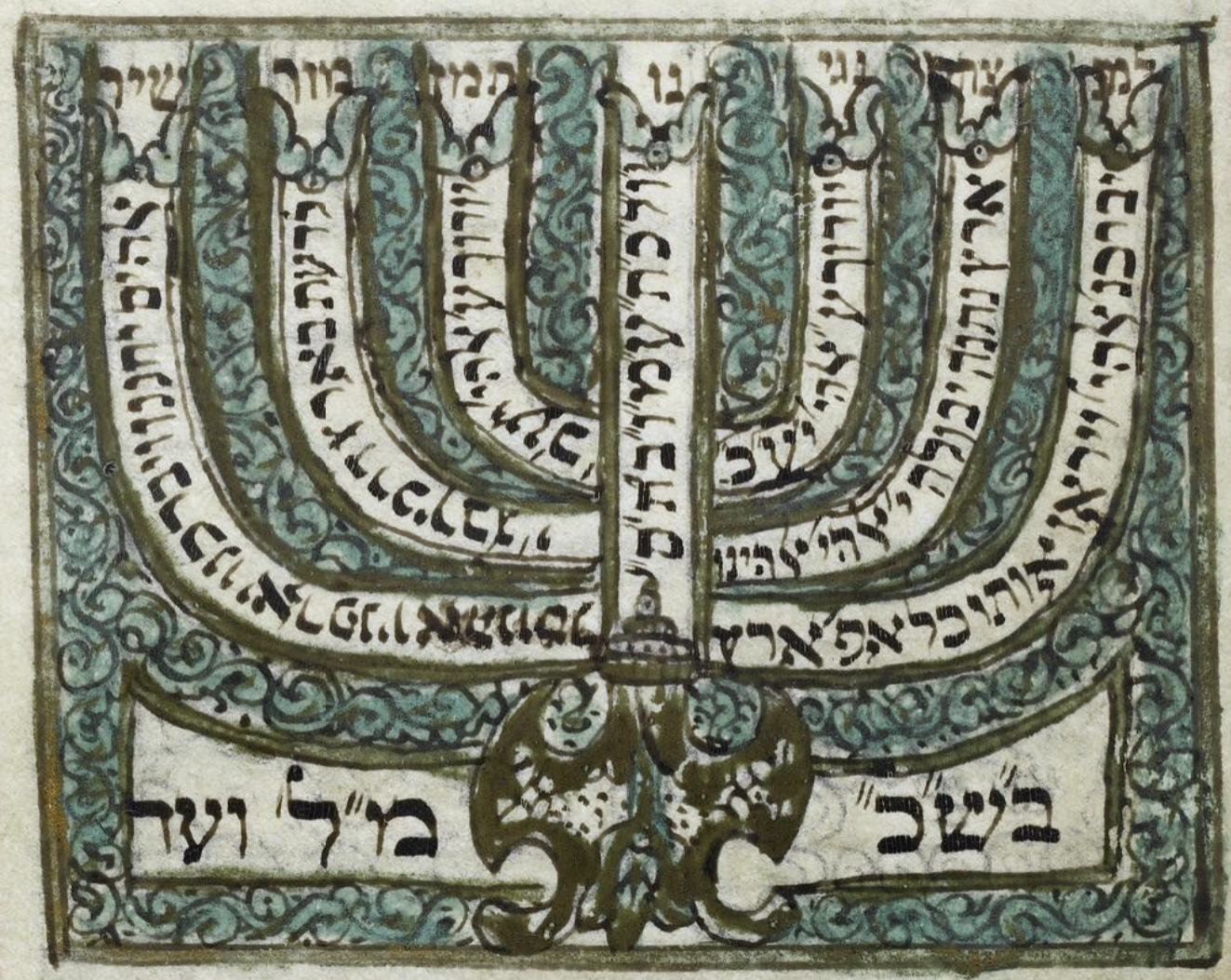
Illumination of Psalm 67 in the shape of a menorah, as part of the Kiddush levana service (1728).

Epstein Ashkenazi also cites "the Qabbalists" to recommend reciting Psalm 67 while mentally tracing the shape of a menorah, as part of Kiddush levana. Within a few decades, illuminated Kiddush levana prayerbooks would include micrography of Psalm 67 in the shape of a menorah.

Jacob Joshua Falk, an anti-Sabbatean crusader, condemned the practice in 1739:

There are those who nowadays write some verses on a small parchment, such as "I have set the Lord before me always" or "A fire must be kept burning" (Lev. 6:6) or "The Lord will be merciful" (Psalms 67:2), drawn in the shape of a menorah. I do not know what it signifies and this practice is closer to being forbidden than being permitted . . . there is an absolute prohibition.

In 1820 Hayyim Mordecai Margolioth described congregants with private shivitis:

About the common practice wherein they draw menorahs on parchment to place them in prayerbooks, and write in them "I have set the Lord before me always", and the tetragrammaton and names of God and the menorah . . . and the reason is to remind them not to talk during prayer due to terror of the tetragrammaton being right in front of them.

Judah Idel Scherschewsky recorded synagogue use in 1861:

The congregations' practice is to place a wood or parchment or paper or bronze plaque before the ark, in front of the cantor, and to write on it "I have set the Lord before me always" . . . The artisans add more verses and quotations to this, around the verse and above it and to its side, and different decorations, including lions, leopards, stags, eagles, and doves . . .

Both synagogue and personal use were common by the end of the nineteenth century. Orthodox rabbinic authorities were greatly displeased by the propagation of these shivitis, which they complained were not treated with the respect the tetragrammaton deserved. Yisrael Meir Kagan allowed only the synagogue shiviti, and then only if it was kept under glass and away from candles.

== Other forms ==
Begun in the 18th and 19th centuries, this turned into a whole branch of Judaic art. Today, a Jewish artists produce various modern forms of Shiviti, sometimes merging the old Kabbalistic traditions with New Age and Far Eastern motifs.

See mizrach article for double-purpose items, the mizrach-shiviti, sometimes in the shape of artistic papercuts, with highly elaborate examples from the 19th to early 20th century in the collection of the Jewish Museum of New York.

== See also ==
- Judaica (Judaic art)
- Religious image
