= Cult image =

Human-made object that is venerated for the deity, person, or spirit that it represents

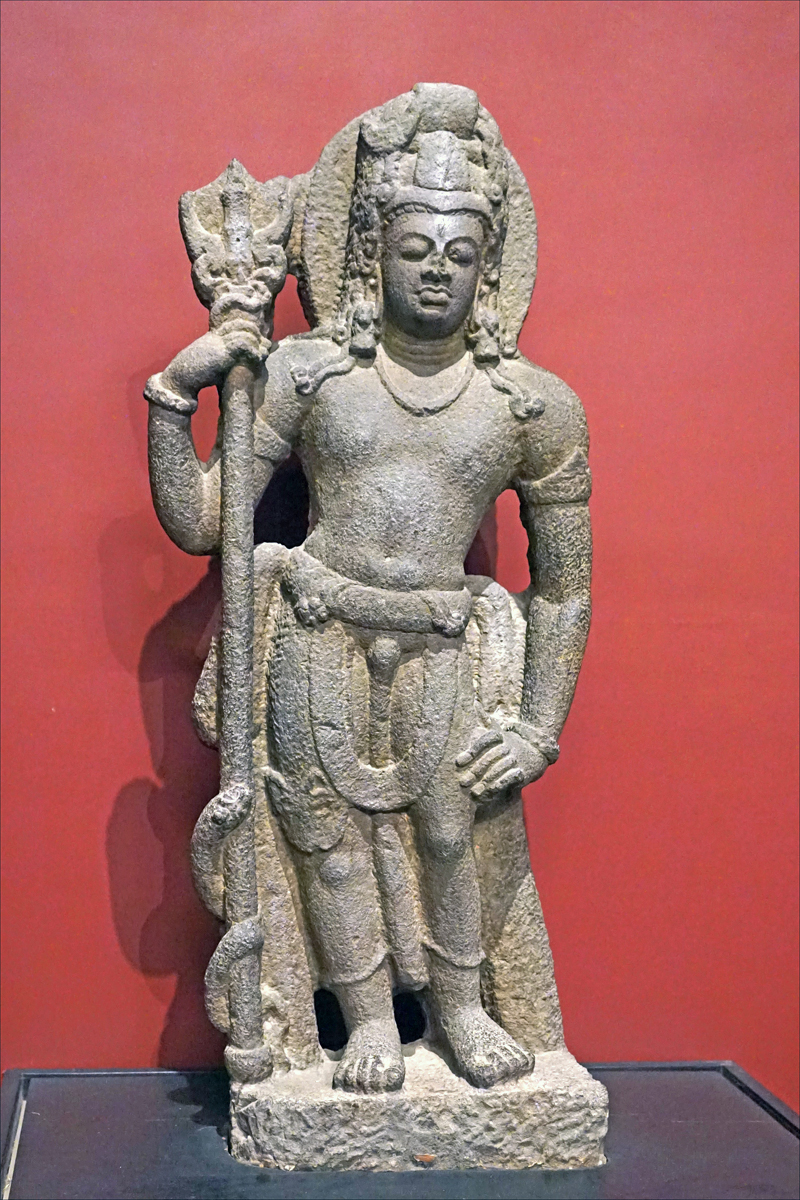
6th-century stone murti of the Hindu god Shiva

In the practice of religion, a cult image is a human-made object that is venerated or worshipped for the person, deity, spirit, or daemon that it embodies or represents. In several traditions, including the ancient religions of Egypt, Greece, Rome and India, cult images in a temple may undergo a daily routine of being washed, dressed, and having food left for them. Processions outside the temple on special feast days are often a feature. Religious images cover a wider range of all types of images made with a religious purpose, subject, or connection. In many contexts "cult image" specifically means the most important image in a temple, kept in an inner space, as opposed to what may be many other images decorating the temple.

== Prehistoric civilizations ==
The earliest so-called Venus figurines have been dated to the prehistoric Upper Paleolithic era (35–40 ka onwards). Archaeological evidence from the islands of the Aegean Sea have yielded Neolithic era Cycladic figures from 4th and 3rd millennium BC, idols in namaste posture from Indus Valley civilization sites from the 3rd millennium BC, and much older petroglyphs around the world show humans began producing sophisticated images. However, because of a lack of historic texts describing these, it is unclear what, if any connection with religious beliefs, these figures had, or whether they had other meaning and uses, even as toys.

== Antiquity ==
=== Ancient Near East and Egypt ===
One of the earliest known cult images worshiped by humans. From Jericho, in modern-day Palestinian Territories. Pre-pottery Neolithic. Jordan Archaeological Museum, Amman, Jordan

The earliest historic records confirming cult images are from the ancient Egyptian civilization, thereafter related to the Greek civilization. By the 2nd millennium BC two broad forms of cult image appear, in one images are zoomorphic (god in the image of animal or animal-human fusion) and in another anthropomorphic (god in the image of man). The former is more commonly found in ancient Egypt influenced beliefs, while the anthropomorphic images are more commonly found in Indo-European cultures. Symbols of nature, useful animals or feared animals may also be included by both. The stelae from 4,000 to 2,500 BC period discovered in France, Ireland through Ukraine, and in Central Asia through South Asia, suggest that the ancient anthropomorphic figures included zoomorphic motifs. In Nordic and Indian subcontinent, bovine (cow, ox, -*gwdus, -*g'ou) motifs or statues, for example, were common. In Ireland, iconic images included pigs.

The use of images in the Ancient Near East seems typically to have been similar to that of the ancient Egyptian religion, about which we are the best-informed. Temples housed a cult image, and there were large numbers of other images. The ancient Hebrew religion was or became an exception, rejecting cult images despite developing monotheism; the connection between this and the Atenism that Akhenaten tried to impose on Egypt has been much discussed. In the art of Amarna, Aten is represented only as the sun-disk, with rays emanating from it, sometimes ending in hands, and temples to Aten (e.g. the Great Temple of the Aten in Amarna) were open courts with no roof, that the Sun might be worshipped directly as it traveled across the sky.

Cult images were a common presence in ancient Egypt, and still are in modern-day Kemetism. The term is often confined to the relatively small images, typically in gold, that lived in the naos in the inner sanctuary of Egyptian temples dedicated to that god (except when taken on ceremonial outings, say to visit their spouse). These images usually showed the god in their sacred barque or boat; none of them survive. Only the priests were allowed access to the inner sanctuary.

There was also a huge range of smaller images, many kept in the homes of ordinary people. The very large stone images around the exteriors of temples were usually representations of the pharaoh as himself or "as" a deity, and many other images gave deities the features of the current royal family.

=== Classical Greece and Rome ===
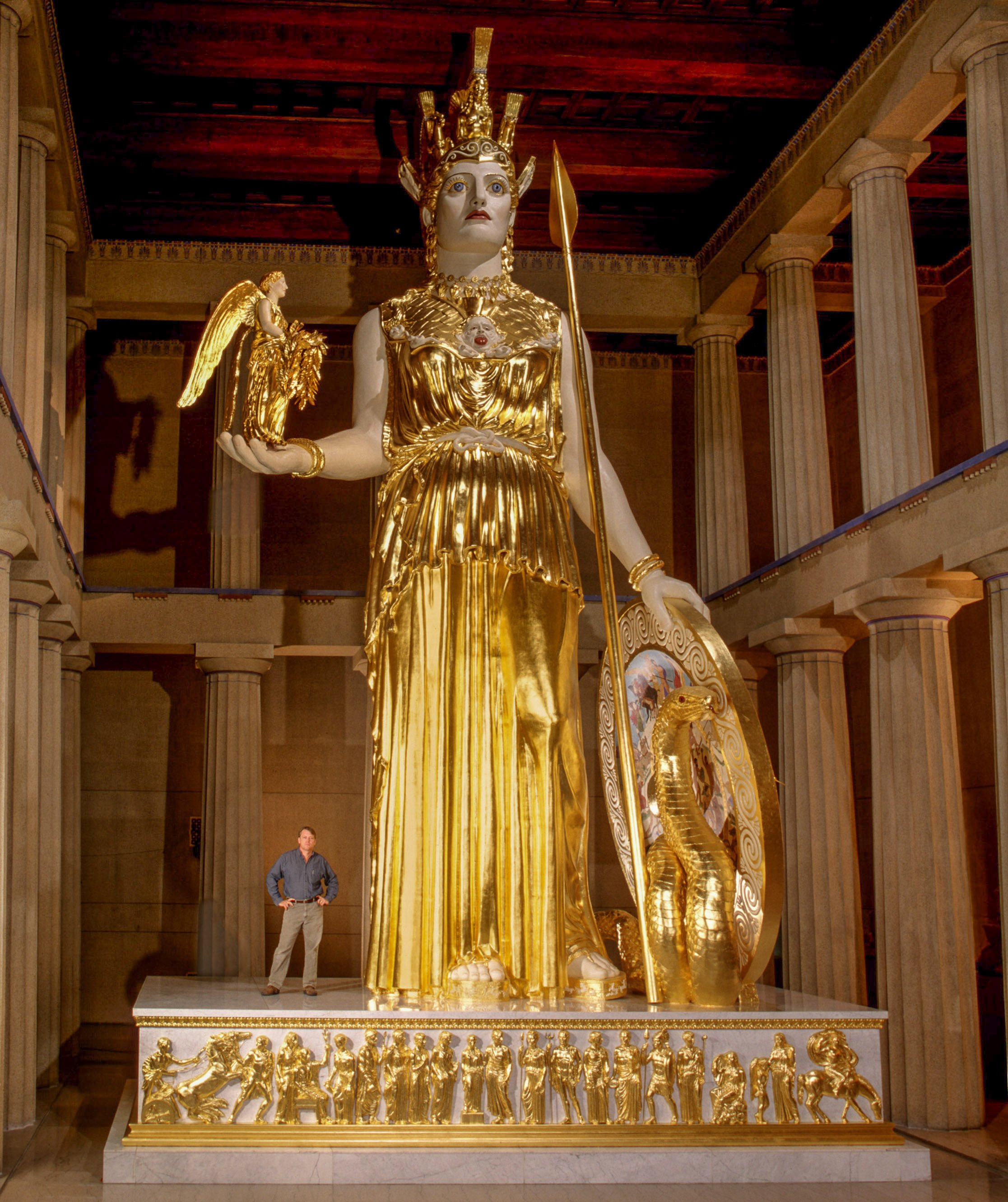
Recreation of the Athena Parthenos statue at the original size in the Parthenon in Nashville, Tennessee

Ancient Greek temples and Roman temples normally contained a cult image in the cella. The cella in Greek temples was in the center, while it was located in the back of Roman temples. Access to the cella varied, but apart from the priests, at the least some of the general worshippers could access the cella some of the time, though sacrifices to the deity were normally made on altars outside in the temple precinct (temenos in Greek). Some cult images were easy to see, and were major tourist attractions. The image normally took the form of a statue of the deity, typically roughly life-size, but in some cases many times life-size, in marble or bronze, or in the specially prestigious form of a Chryselephantine statue using ivory plaques for the visible parts of the body and gold for the clothes, around a wooden framework. Most cult statues are anthropromorphic and take human shape. The most famous Greek cult images were of this type, including the Statue of Zeus at Olympia, and Phidias's Athena Parthenos in the Parthenon in Athens, both colossal statues now completely lost. Fragments of two chryselephantine statues from Delphi have been excavated.

The acrolith was another composite form, this time a cost-saving one with a wooden body. A xoanon was a primitive and symbolic wooden image, perhaps comparable to the Hindu lingam; many of these were retained and revered for their antiquity. Many of the Greek statues well-known from Roman marble copies were originally temple cult images, which in some cases, such as the Apollo Barberini, can be credibly identified. A very few actual originals survive, for example the bronze Piraeus Athena (2.35 metres high, including a helmet).

In Greek and Roman mythology, a "palladium" was an image of great antiquity on which the safety of a city was said to depend, especially the wooden one that Odysseus and Diomedes stole from the citadel of Troy and which was later taken to Rome by Aeneas. (The Roman story was related in Virgil's Aeneid and other works.)

== Abrahamic religions ==
Some members of Abrahamic religions identify cult images as idols and their worship or veneration as idolatry, the worship of hollow forms, though others do not. The matter has long been controversial, depending largely on the degree of veneration or worship which is thought by opponents to be given to them. The word idol entered Middle English in the 13th century from Old French idole adapted in Ecclesiastical Latin from the Greek eidolon ("appearance"), a diminutive of eidos ("form").

The Book of Isaiah gave the classic expression to the paradox that Abrahamic religions have traditionally claimed to be present in the worship of cult images:

Their land also is full of idols; they worship the work of their own hands, that which their own fingers have made.

— Isaiah 2.8, reflected in Isaiah 17.8.

The term idol, usually pejorative in English (except in Indian English where it usually carries no hostile implication), is an image or representation of a god used as an object of worship, while idolatry is the worship of an "idol" as though it were God. Anthropologists reporting on many cultures are generally sceptical that images themselves are in fact regarded as deities within religions, rather than representations of deities; this, however, has been since antiquity the recurrent charge of those opposed to religious images.

=== Judaism ===
Judaism emphatically forbids idolatry, and considers it one of the gravest sins.

Judaism is aniconic, meaning any physical depiction of God whatsoever is disallowed; this likewise applies to cult images. The prohibition of idols within Judaism is so severe that numerous stipulations exist which are beyond simply concerning their use: Jews cannot eat anything offered to an idol as a libation, cannot move openly in places where idols are present, and cannot interact with idol worshippers within certain timeframes of idolatrous festivals or gatherings.

As time progressed and the religious traditions which the Jews were exposed to diversified, what was considered "idolatry" was subject to some debate. In the Mishnah and Talmud, idolatry is defined as worshipping a graven image through the actions of both typical idol worshippers, and through actions customarily reserved for worship of the Jewish God in the Temple in Jerusalem, such as prostrating, sacrificing animals, offering incense, or sprinkling animal blood on altars. Kissing, embracing, or "honoring" an idol, while not considered idolatry per se, was still forbidden.

=== Christianity ===
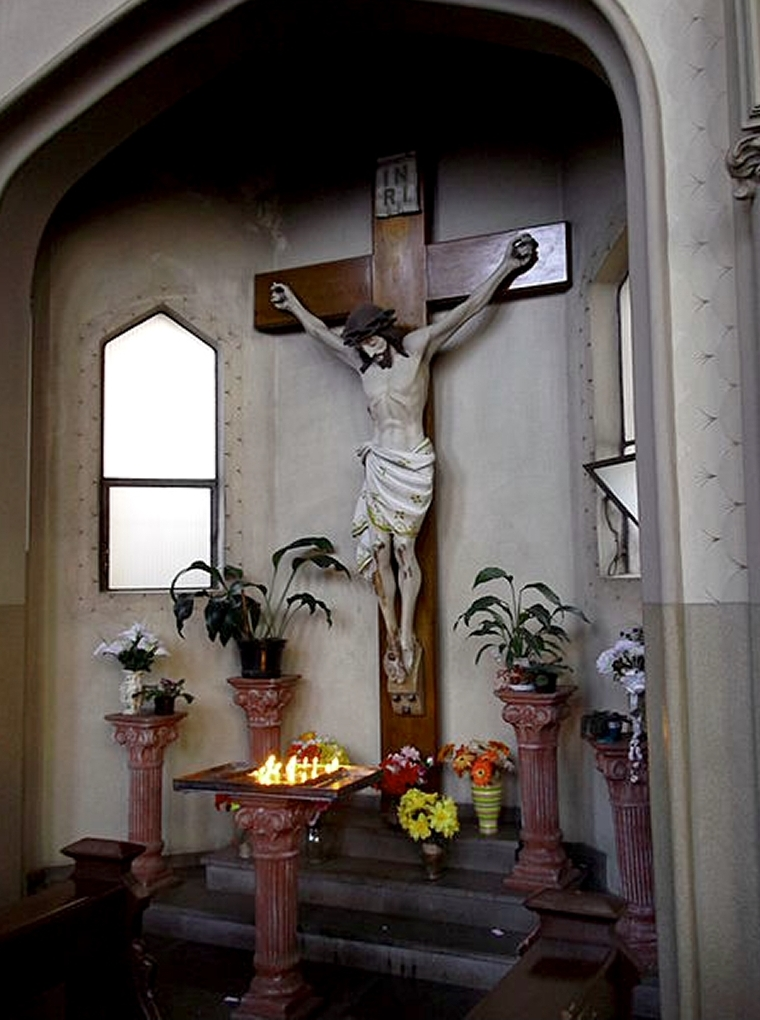
Brazilian crucifix

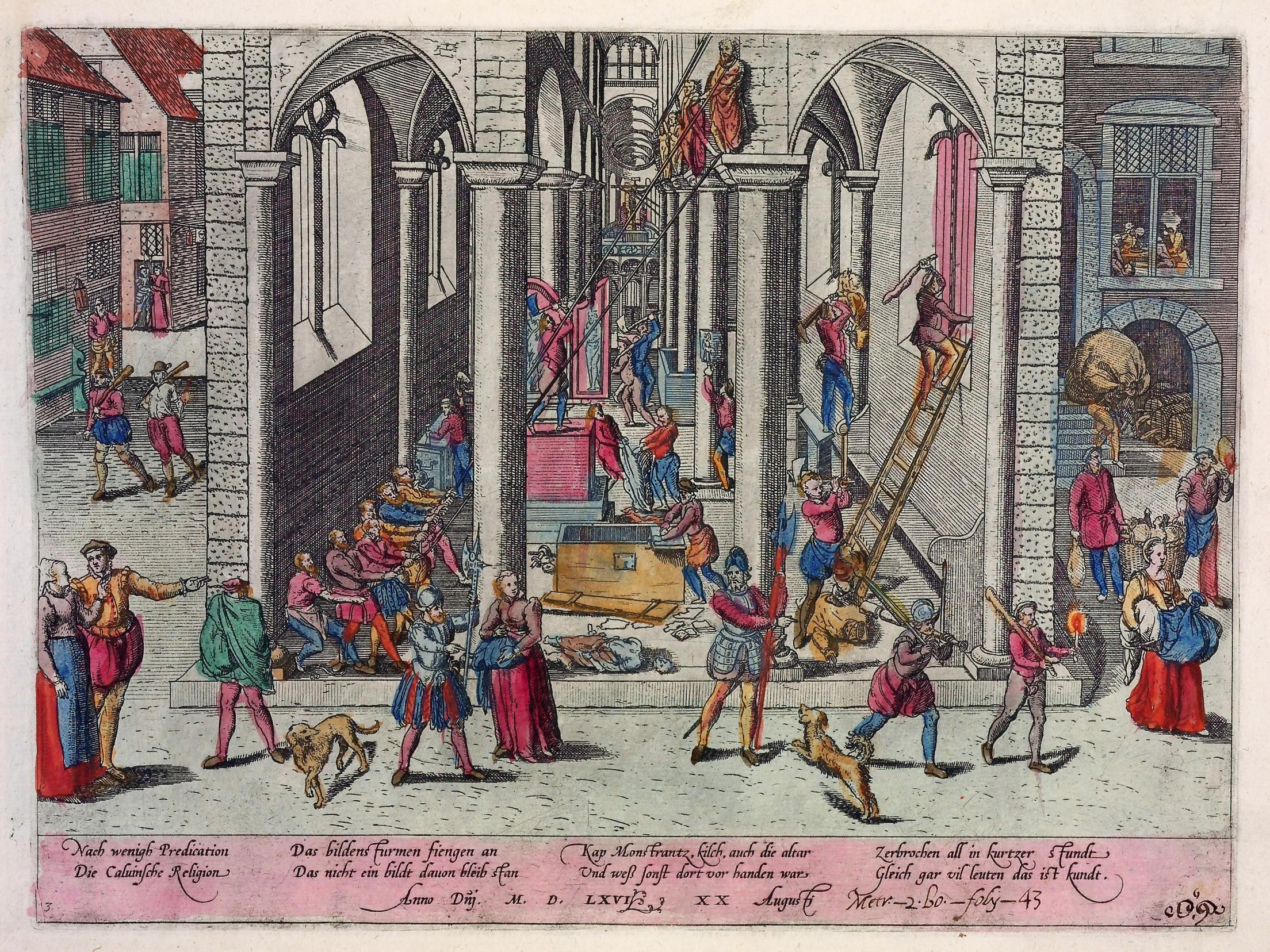
Frans Hogenberg, The Calvinist Iconoclastic Riot of August 20, 1566, in Antwerp, the key moment of the Beeldenstorm in 1566, when paintings and church decorations and fittings were destroyed in several weeks of a violent iconoclastic outbreak in the Low Countries. Several similar episodes occurred during the early Reformation period.

Christian images that are venerated are called icons. Christians who venerate icons make an emphatic distinction between "veneration" and "worship". Catholic and Eastern Orthodox Christians make an exception for the veneration of images of saints – they distinguish such veneration from adoration or latria.

The introduction of venerable images in Christianity was highly controversial for centuries, and in Eastern Orthodoxy the controversy lingered until it re-erupted in the Byzantine Iconoclasm of the 8th and 9th centuries. Religious monumental sculpture remained foreign to Orthodoxy. In the West, resistance to idolatry delayed the introduction of sculpted images for centuries until the time of Charlemagne, whose placing of a life-size crucifix in the Palatine Chapel, Aachen was probably a decisive moment, leading to the widespread use of monumental reliefs on churches, and later large statues. Many Christians believed that idols were not merely idle statues, but that they are inhabited by demons who could exercise influence through the idol. By destroying idols, converted Christians believed to deprave devils of their earthly and material dwelling.

The Libri Carolini, an eighth-century work composed at the command of Charlemagne in response to the Second Council of Nicaea, set out what remains the Catholic position on the veneration of images, giving them a similar but slightly less significant place than in Eastern Orthodoxy.

The 16th-century Reformation engendered spates of destruction of images, especially in England, Scotland, Ireland, Germany, Switzerland, the Low Countries (the Beeldenstorm), and France. Destruction of three-dimensional images was normally near-total, especially images of the Virgin Mary and saints, and the iconoclasts ("image-breakers") also smashed representations of holy figures in stained glass windows and other imagery. Further destruction of icons, anathema to Puritans, occurred during the English Civil War. Less extreme transitions occurred throughout northern Europe in which formerly Catholic churches became Protestant.

Catholic regions of Europe, especially artistic centres like Rome and Antwerp, responded to Reformation iconoclasm with a Counter-Reformation renewal of religious imagery, though banning some of the more fanciful medieval iconographies. Veneration of the Virgin Mary flourished, in practice and in imagery, and new shrines, such as in Rome's Santa Maria Maggiore, were built for Medieval miraculous icons as part of this trend.

According to the Catechism of the Catholic Church:

The Christian veneration of images is not contrary to the first commandment which proscribes idols. Indeed, "the honor rendered to an image passes to its prototype", and "whoever venerates an image venerates the person portrayed in it". The honor paid to sacred images is a "respectful veneration", not the adoration due to God alone:

Religious worship is not directed to images in themselves, considered as mere things, but under their distinctive aspect as images leading us on to God incarnate. The movement toward the image does not terminate in it as image, but tends toward that whose image it is.

=== Islam ===
Towards the end of the pre-Islamic era in the Arabian city of Mecca, an era otherwise known by the Muslims as جاهلية, or al-Jahiliyah, the pagan or pre-Islamic merchants of Mecca controlled the sacred Kaaba, thereby regulating control over it and, in turn, over the city itself. The local tribes of the Arabian peninsula came to this centre of commerce to place their idols in the Kaaba, in the process being charged tithes. This helped the Meccan merchants to incur substantial wealth, as well as ensuring a fruitful atmosphere for trade and intertribal relations in relative peace.

Muhammad's preaching incurred the wrath of the pagan merchants, causing them to revolt against him. The opposition to his teachings grew so volatile that Muhammad and his followers were forced to flee Mecca to Medina for protection, leading to armed conflict and triggering many battles that were won and lost, which finally culminated in the conquest of Mecca in the year 630. In the aftermath, Muhammad did three things. Firstly, with his companions he visited the Kaaba and literally threw out the idols and destroyed them, thus removing the signs of Jahiliyyah from the Kaaba. Secondly, he ordered the construction of a mosque around the Kaaba, the first Masjid al-Haram of Islam. Thirdly, Muhammad pardoned all those who had taken up arms against him. With the destruction of the idols and the construction of the Masjid al-Haram, a new era was ushered in, facilitating the rise of Islam.

== Australesian religions ==
=== Philippines ===
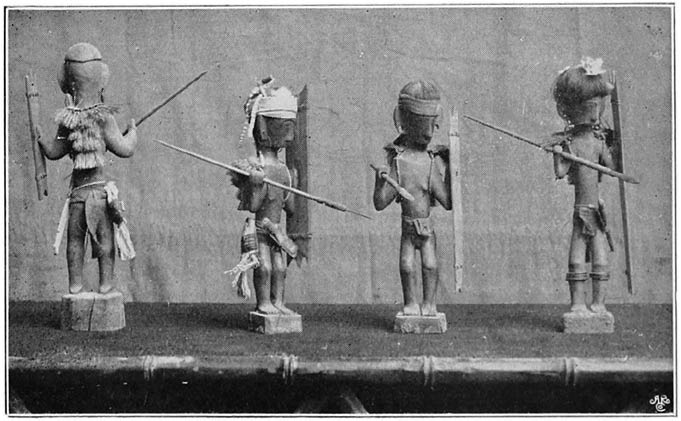
Igorot hipag depicting war deities (c. 1900)

Anito in modern Filipino context can mean idolatry or an idol of heathen deity

Anito worship in ancient Philippines involves venerating carved images often made from wood that represent ancestral spirits and ancestral deities. These wooden figures, known as anito or sometimes bulul among certain groups like the Ifugao, were believed to embody the presence or power of the spirits they represent. Indigenous Filipinos offered prayers, food, and rituals to these images, treating them not merely as symbols but as actual vessels or manifestations of the supernatural. This act of directing devotion and reverence toward physical objects, as though the spirit resided within or could be influenced through them, classifies the practice as idolatry in many theological frameworks, particularly those that distinguish between worship of a supreme being and veneration of material representations.

=== Polynesia ===
The Polynesian people have had a range of polytheistic theologies found across the Pacific Ocean. The Polynesian people produced idols from wood, and congregated around these idols for worship.

The Christian missionaries, particularly from the London Missionary Society such as John Williams, and others such as the Methodist Missionary Society, characterized these as idolatry, in the sense of islanders worshipping false gods. They sent back reports which primarily focussed on "overthrow of pagan idolatry" as evidence of their Christian sects triumph, with fewer mentions of actual converts and baptism.

== Dharmic religions ==
The oldest forms of the ancient religions of India apparently made no use of idols. While the Vedic literature leading up to Hinduism is extensive, in the form of Samhitas, Brahmanas, Aranyakas and Upanishads, and has been dated to have been composed over a period of centuries (1200 BC to 200 BC), historical Vedic religion appears not to have used idols up to around 500 BC at least. The early Buddhist and Jain (pre-200 BC) traditions suggest no evidence of cult images. The Vedic literature mentions many gods and goddesses, as well as the use of Homa (votive ritual using fire), but it does not mention images or their worship. The ancient Buddhist, Hindu and Jaina texts discuss the nature of existence, whether there is or is not a creator deity such as in the Nasadiya Sukta of the Rigveda, they describe meditation, they recommend the pursuit of simple monastic life and self-knowledge, they debate the nature of absolute reality as Brahman or Śūnyatā, yet the ancient Indian texts mention no use of images. Indologists such as the Max Muller, Jan Gonda, Pandurang Vaman Kane, Ramchandra Narayan Dandekar, Horace Hayman Wilson, Stephanie Jamison and other scholars state that "there is no evidence for icons or images representing god(s)" in the ancient religions of India. Use of idols developed among the Indian religions later, perhaps first in Buddhism, where large images of the Buddha appear by the 1st century AD.

According to John Grimes, a professor of Indian philosophy, Indian thought denied even dogmatic idolatry of its scriptures. Everything has been left to challenge, arguments and enquiry, with the medieval Indian scholar Vācaspati Miśra stating that not all scripture is authoritative, only scripture which "reveals the identity of the individual self and the supreme self as the non-dual Absolute".

The first attested date in peer-reviewed academic literature for the worship of murti (Sanskrit) or vigraha (Sanskrit) in India is not clear, as different sources have different opinions and interpretations. However, the Indus Valley Civilization (circa 2500 - 1500 BCE) may have produced some of the earliest murtis or vigrahas in India, as evidenced by various terracotta and bronze figurines found in the archaeological sites. Some of these figurines have been interpreted as representations of deities, such as the so-called Pashupati seal, which depicts a horned figure surrounded by animals and possibly identified with Shiva. Another example is the bronze statuette of a Dancing Girl, which some scholars have associated with Parvati or Shakti. However, these interpretations are not universally accepted, and some scholars have argued that the Indus Valley Civilization did not practice murti or vigraha worship, but rather used symbols and signs to express their religious beliefs.

The Vedic period (circa 1500 - 500 BCE) is traditionally considered as the origin of Hinduism proper, but it also did not emphasize murti or vigraha worship, as the Vedic religion was mainly focused on fire sacrifices and hymns to various gods and goddesses. However, some Vedic texts do mention the use of clay or wooden images for ritual purposes, such as the Shatapatha Brahmana (circa 8th - 6th century BCE), which describes how a clay image of Prajapati (the creator god) was made and consecrated for the agnicayana ritual. Another example is the Aitareya Brahmana (circa 8th - 6th century BCE), which mentions how a wooden image of Varuna (the god of water and law) was installed in a temple and worshipped by the king. These examples suggest that murti or vigraha worship was not unknown in the Vedic period, but it was not widespread nor dominant.

The post-Vedic period (circa 500 BCE - 300 CE) witnessed the emergence and development of various religious movements and schools, such as Vaishnavism, Shaivism, Shaktism, Buddhism, Jainism and others. This period also saw the rise of murti or vigraha worship as a prominent feature of Hinduism, as evidenced by various literary and archaeological sources.

For instance, the Ramayana (circa 5th - 4th century BCE) and the Mahabharata (circa 4th - 3rd century BCE) contain several references to murti or vigraha worship, such as Rama worshipping a Shiva linga at Rameshwaram, or Krishna installing an image of Vishnu at Dwarka. Many stone and metal sculptures of various deities and saints have been found from later periods, such as the famous Pancha Rathas at Mahabalipuram (circa 7th century CE), which depict five chariots dedicated to different gods and goddesses.

=== Hinduism ===
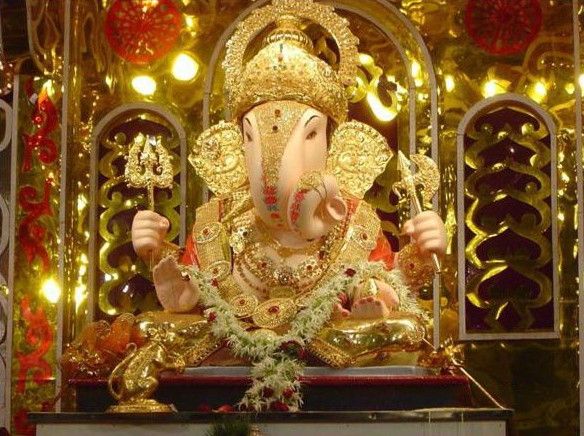
The murti of the Dagadusheth Halwai Ganapati Temple

The garbhagriha or inner shrine of a Hindu temple contains an image of the deity. This may take the form of an elaborate statue, or a symbolic lingam is also very common, and sometimes a yoni or other symbolic form, especially in Shiva temples. Normally only the priests are allowed to enter the inner chamber, but Hindu temple architecture typically allows the image to be seen by worshippers in the mandapa connected to it (entry to this, and the whole temple, may also be restricted in various ways).

Hinduism allows for many forms of worship and therefore it neither prescribes nor proscribes worship of images (murti). In Hinduism, murti usually means an image that expresses a Divine Spirit (murta). Meaning literally "embodiment", a murti is a representation of a divinity, made usually of stone, wood, or metal, which serves as a means through which a divinity may be worshiped. Hindus consider a murti worthy of serving as a focus of divine worship only after the divine is invoked in it for the purpose of offering worship. The depiction of the divinity must reflect the gestures and proportions outlined in religious tradition.

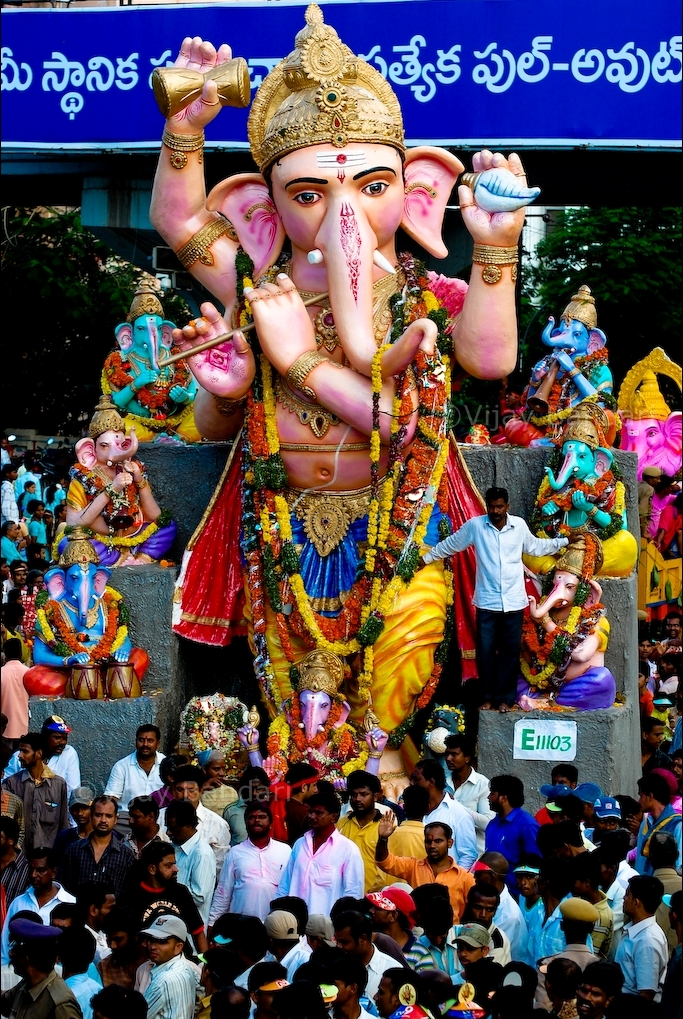
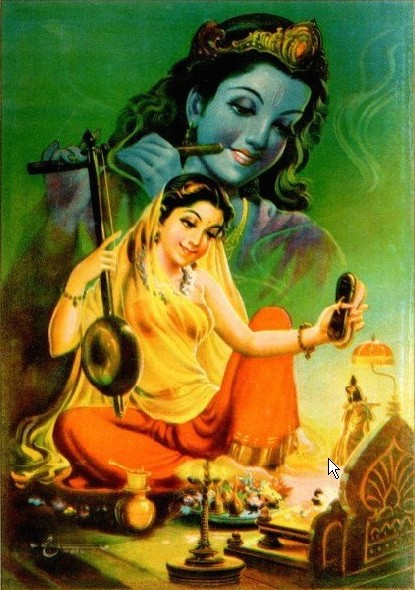
Ganesha statue during a contemporary festival (left), and Bhakti saint Meera singing before an image of Krishna

In Hinduism, an icon, image or statue is called murti or pratima. Major Hindu traditions such as Vaishnavism, Shaivism, Shaktism, and Smartism favor the use of a murti (idol). These traditions suggest that it is easier to dedicate time and focus on spirituality through anthropomorphic or non-anthropomorphic icons. The Bhagavad Gita – a Hindu scripture – in verse 12.5, states that only a few have the time and mind to ponder and fix on the unmanifested Absolute, and it is much easier to focus on qualities, virtues, aspects of a manifested representation of god, through one's senses, emotions and heart, because the way human beings naturally are. Hindu scriptures such as the Bhagavata Purana (11.27.12), describe eight varieties of murtis: "The Deity form (pratimā) of the Lord is said to appear in eight varieties: stone, wood, metal, earth (clay or plaster), paint, sand, the mind, or jewels."

In Vaishnavism, the building of a temple for the murti is considered an act of devotion, but non-murti symbolism is also common wherein the aromatic tulasi plant or shaligrama is an aniconic reminder of the spiritualism in Vishnu. In the Shaivism tradition of Hinduism, Shiva may be represented as a masculine idol, or half-man half woman Ardhanarishvara form, in an anicon linga-yoni form. The worship rituals associated with the murti, correspond to ancient cultural practices for a beloved guest, and the murti is welcomed, taken care of, and then requested to retire.

=== Jainism ===
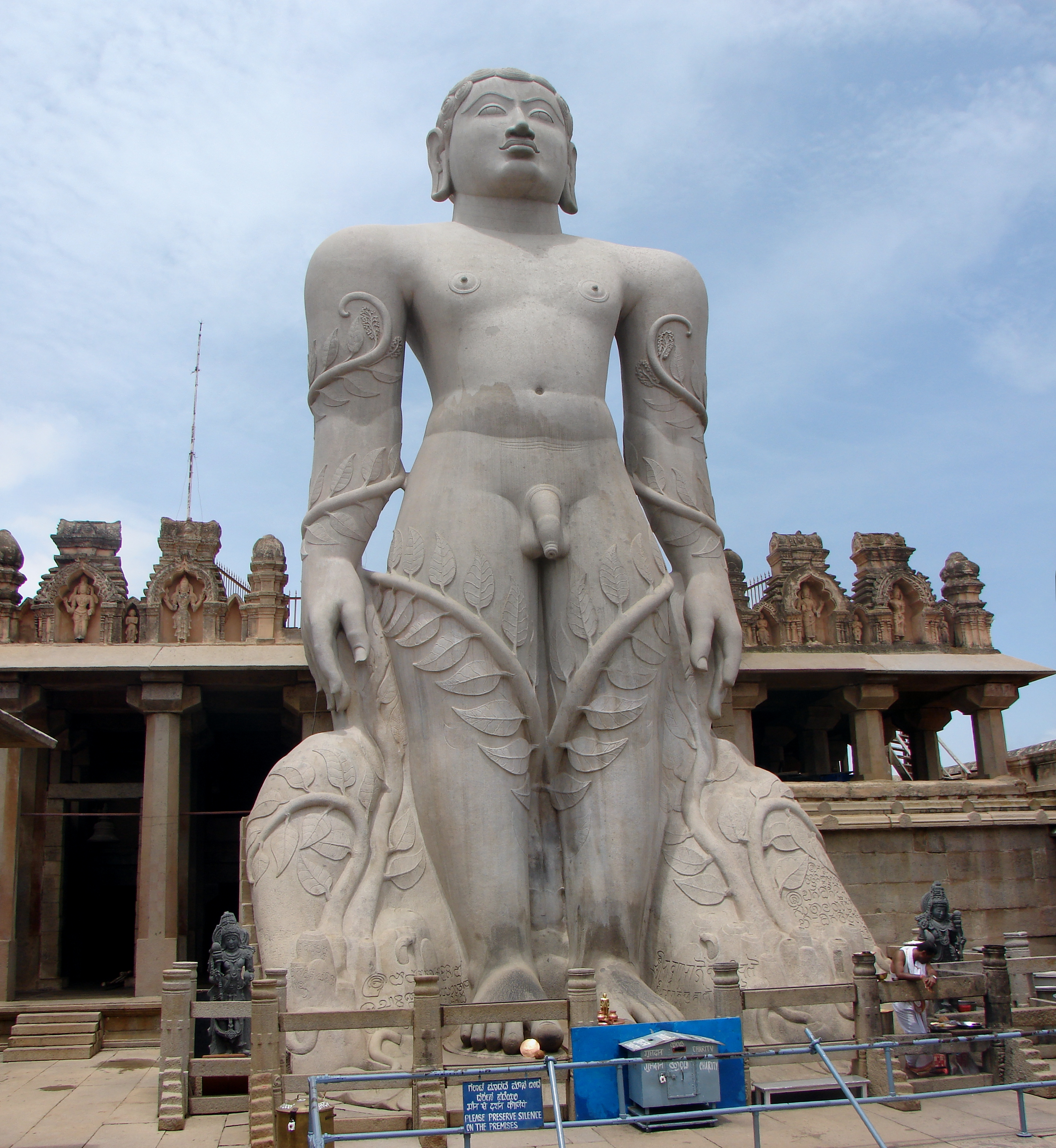
Gomateshwara Bahubali statue in Jainism

In Jainism, the Tirthankaras ("ford-maker") represent the true goal of all human beings. Their qualities are worshipped by the Jains. Images depicting any of the twenty four Tirthankaras are placed in the Jain temples. There is no belief that the image itself is other than a representation of the being it represents. The Tirthankaras cannot respond to such veneration, but that it can function as a meditative aid. Although most veneration takes the form of prayers, hymns and recitations, the cult image is sometimes ritually bathed, and often has offerings made to it; there are eight kinds of offering representing the eight types of karmas as per Jainism. This form of reverence is not a central tenet of the faith.

Devotional worship to cult images has been a prevalent ancient practice in various Jaina sects, wherein learned Tirthankara (Jina) and human gurus have been venerated with offerings, songs and Āratī prayers. Like other major Indian religions, Jainism has premised its spiritual practices on the belief that "all knowledge is inevitably mediated by images" and human beings discover, learn and know what is to be known through "names, images and representations". Thus, idolatry has been a part of the major sects of Jainism such as Digambara and Shvetambara. The earliest archaeological evidence of the idols and images in Jainism is from Mathura, and has been dated to be from the first half of the 1st millennium AD.

The creation of cult images, their consecration, the inclusion of Jaina layperson in images and temples of Jainism by the Jaina monks has been a historic practice. However, during the iconoclastic era of Islamic rule, between the 15th and 17th century, a Lonka sect of Jainism emerged that continued pursuing their traditional spirituality but without the Jaina arts, images and idols.

=== Buddhism ===
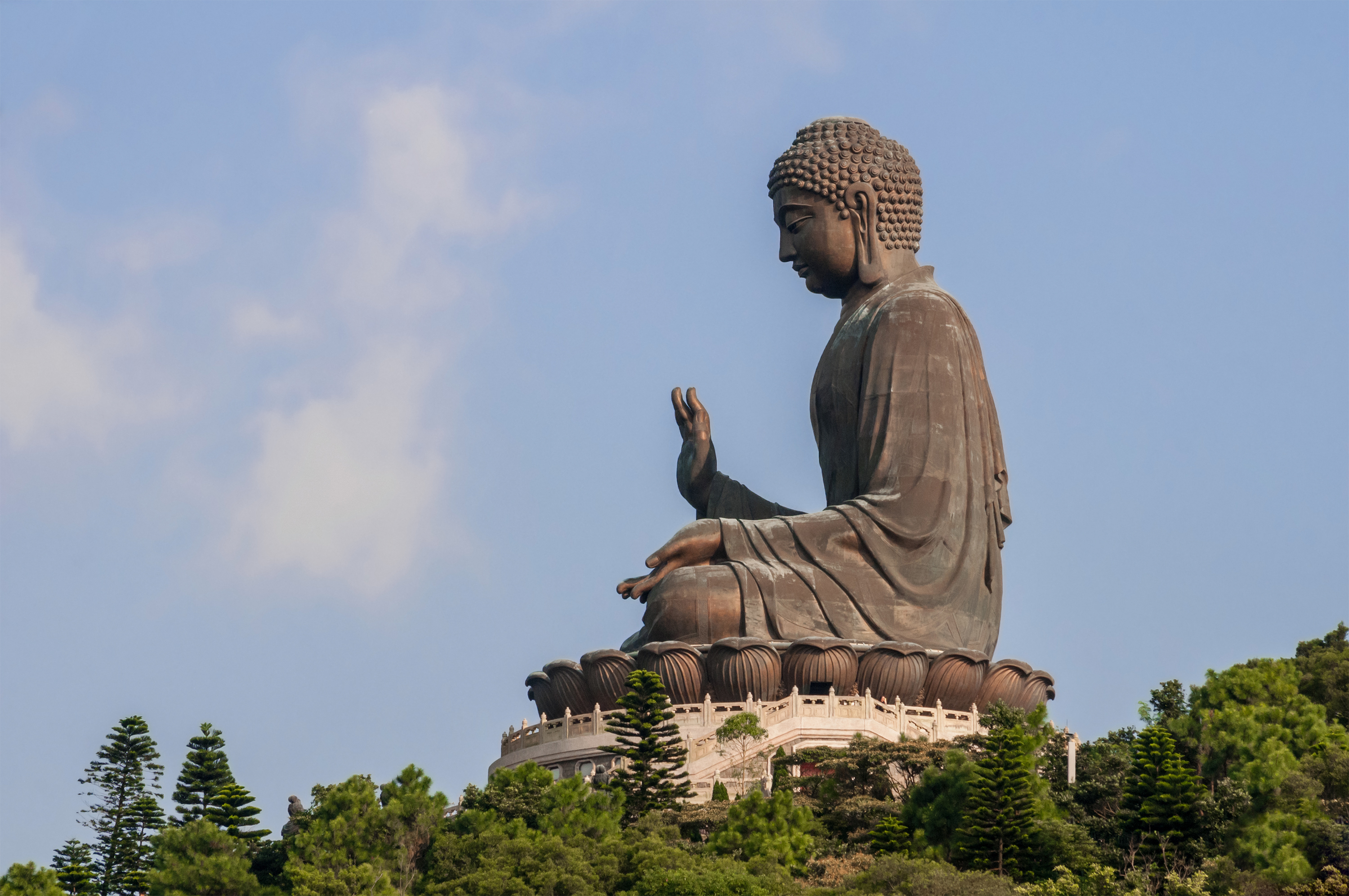
Tian Tan Buddha

Very early Buddhism avoided representations of the Buddha, who was represented by symbols or an empty space. Before altars became common, Buddhists would face either a Buddhist symbol or an area carved into the wall when praying or paying homage. Large images of the Historical Buddha, and other buddhas and bodhisattvas later became important in many schools of Buddhist art, and have mostly remained so. The attitude of the devotee towards the image is highly complicated and variable in Buddhism, depending on the particular tradition, and the degree of training in Buddhist thought of the individual.

The dharma wheel is an image that used for worship in Buddhism. The Dharma represents and symbolizes all of the teachings of the Buddha. The Dharma is a wheel or circle, that maintains different qualities that are meant to be essential to the Buddhist religion. Typically, the wheel shows the eight step path that Buddhists follow to reach Nirvana. The symbol is a wheel in order to show the flow of life: Buddhists believe in reincarnation, so life moves in a circle and does not end in death. The build of the cult image depends on the school of Buddhism that the worshiper belongs to. Buddhist idols that originate from Theravada Buddhism are commonly slim, and majestic. Buddhist idols that originate from Mahayana Buddhism are usually thicker, with a more dignified and nonchalant face. Buddhist idols that originate from Vajrayana Buddhism usually have a more exaggerated posture, and usually show the Buddha / Bodhisattva performing hand Mudras. (This is common for all Buddhist Images, however the Murdras are more yoga-like)

=== Buddhism ===
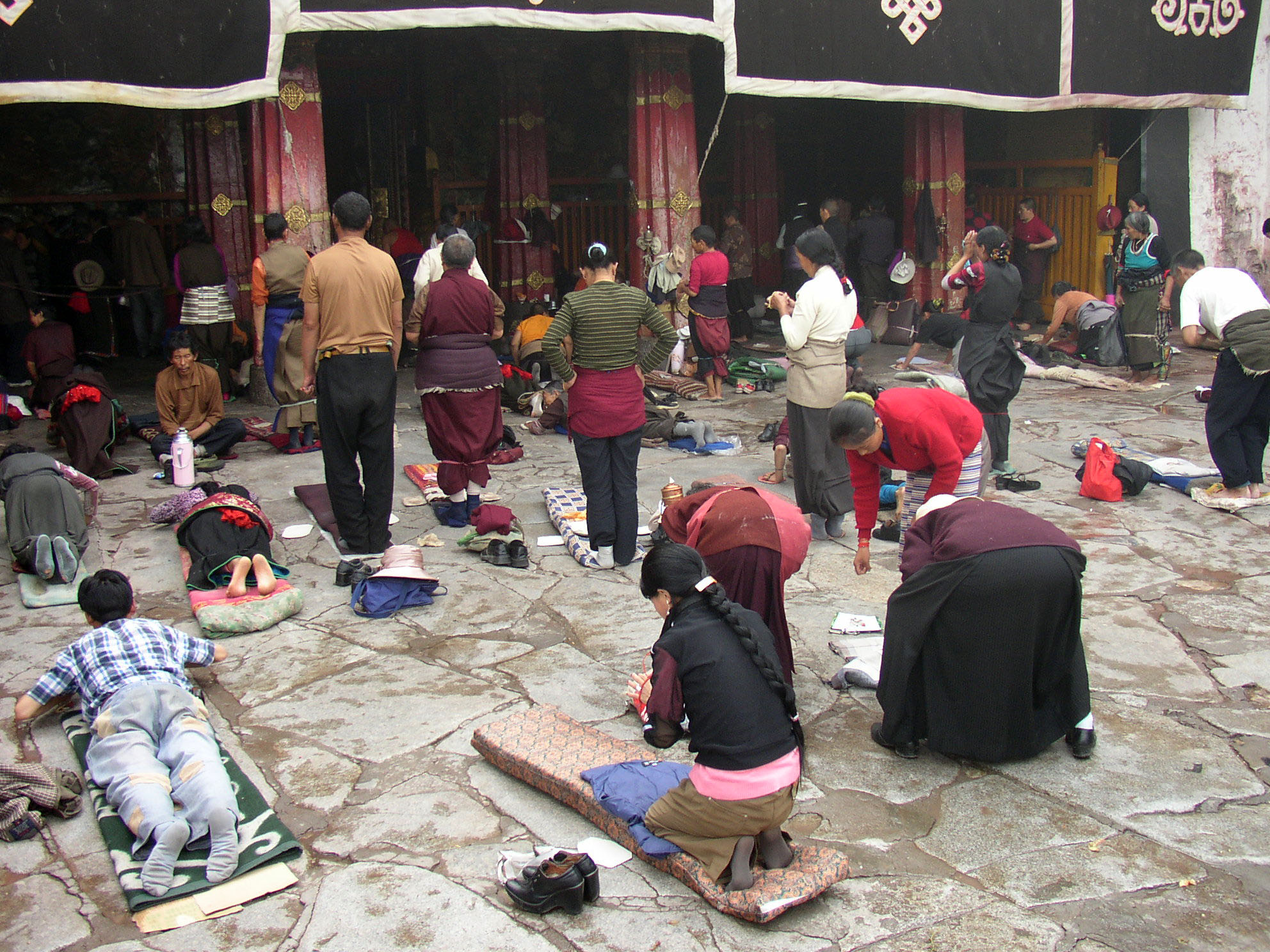
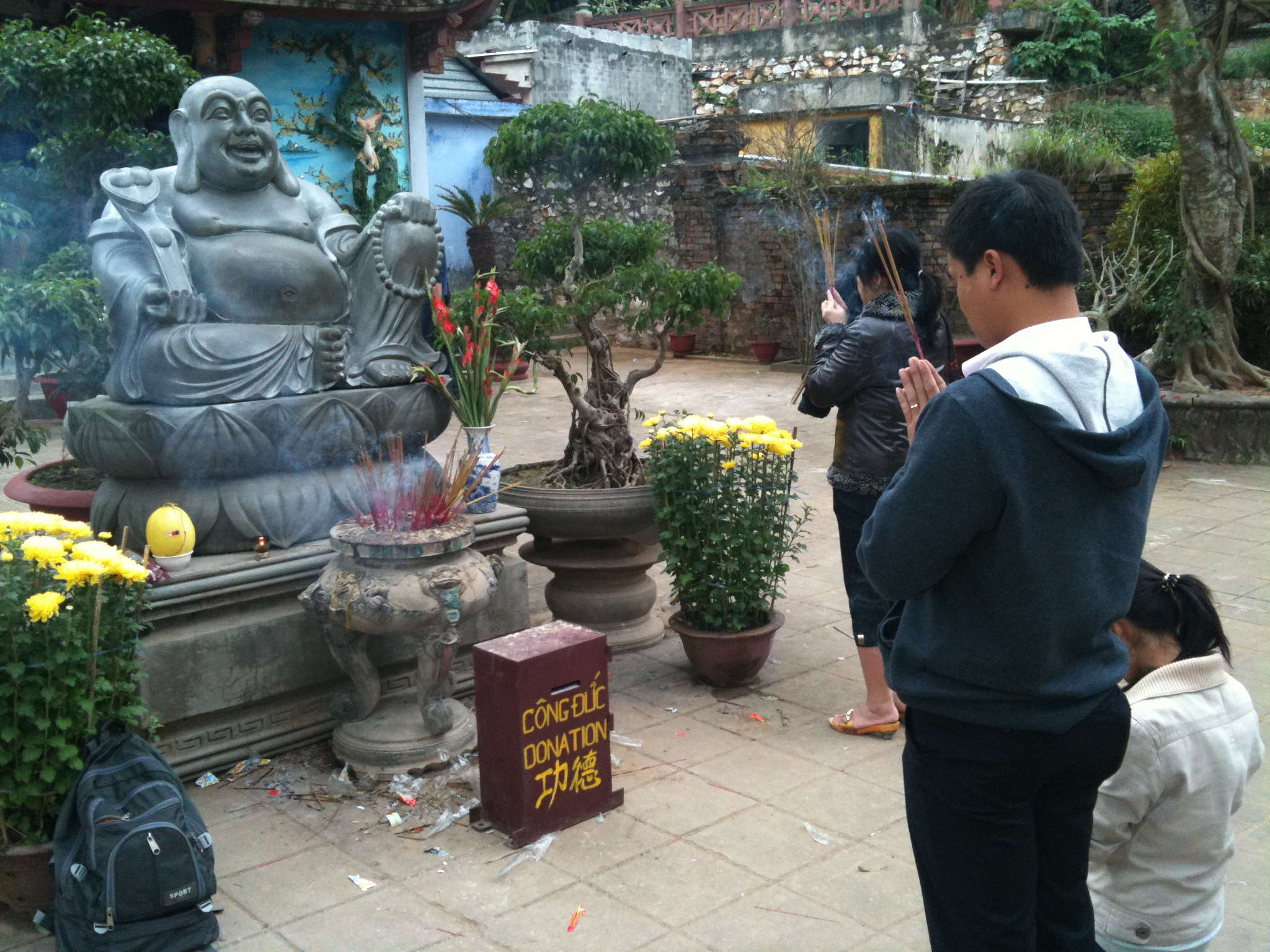
Buddhists praying before a statue in Tibet (left) and Vietnam

According to Eric Reinders, icons have been an integral part of Buddhism throughout its later history. Buddhists, from Korea to Vietnam, Thailand to Tibet, Central Asia to South Asia, have long produced temples and idols, altars and malas, relics to amulets, images to ritual implements. The images or relics of Buddha are found in all Buddhist traditions, but they also feature gods and goddesses such as those in Tibetan Buddhism.

Bhakti (called Bhatti in Pali) has been a common practice in Theravada Buddhism, where offerings and group prayers are made to Cetiya and particularly images of Buddha. Karel Werner notes that Bhakti has been a significant practice in Theravada Buddhism, and states, "there can be no doubt that deep devotion or bhakti / bhatti does exist in Buddhism and that it had its beginnings in the earliest days".

Buddha images spread into northwest Indian subcontinent (now Pakistan and Afghanistan) and into Central Asia with Buddhist Silk Road merchants. The Hindu rulers of different Indian dynasties patronized both Buddhism and Hinduism from 4th to 9th century, building Buddhist icons and cave temples such as the Ajanta Caves and Ellora Caves which featured Buddha idols.

In East Asia and Southeast Asia, worship in Buddhist temples with the aid of icons and sacred objects has been historically prevalent. In Japanese Buddhism, for example, Butsugu (sacred objects) have been integral to the worship of the Buddha (kuyo), and such worship considered a part of the process of realizing one's Buddha nature. This process is more than meditation, it has traditionally included devotional rituals (butsudo) aided by the Buddhist clergy. These practices are also found in Korea and China.

In the Lalitavistara Sutra, the newborn Siddhartha Gautama is taken to a temple to worship the deities enshrined there. The moment the prince steps foot into the temple, the statues of the gods stand up from their seats and prostrate to the feet of the future Buddha.

== East Asian religions ==
=== Shinto ===
In Shinto, cult images are called shintai. The earliest historical examples of these were natural objects such as stones, waterfalls, trees or mountains, like Mount Fuji, while the vast majority are man-made objects such as swords, jewels or mirrors. Rather than being representative of or part of the kami, shintai are seen as repositories in which the essence of such spirits can temporarily reside to make themselves accessible for humans to worship. A ceremony called kanjō can be used to propagate the essence of a kami into another shintai, allowing the same deity to be enshrined in multiple shrines.

== Native American religions ==
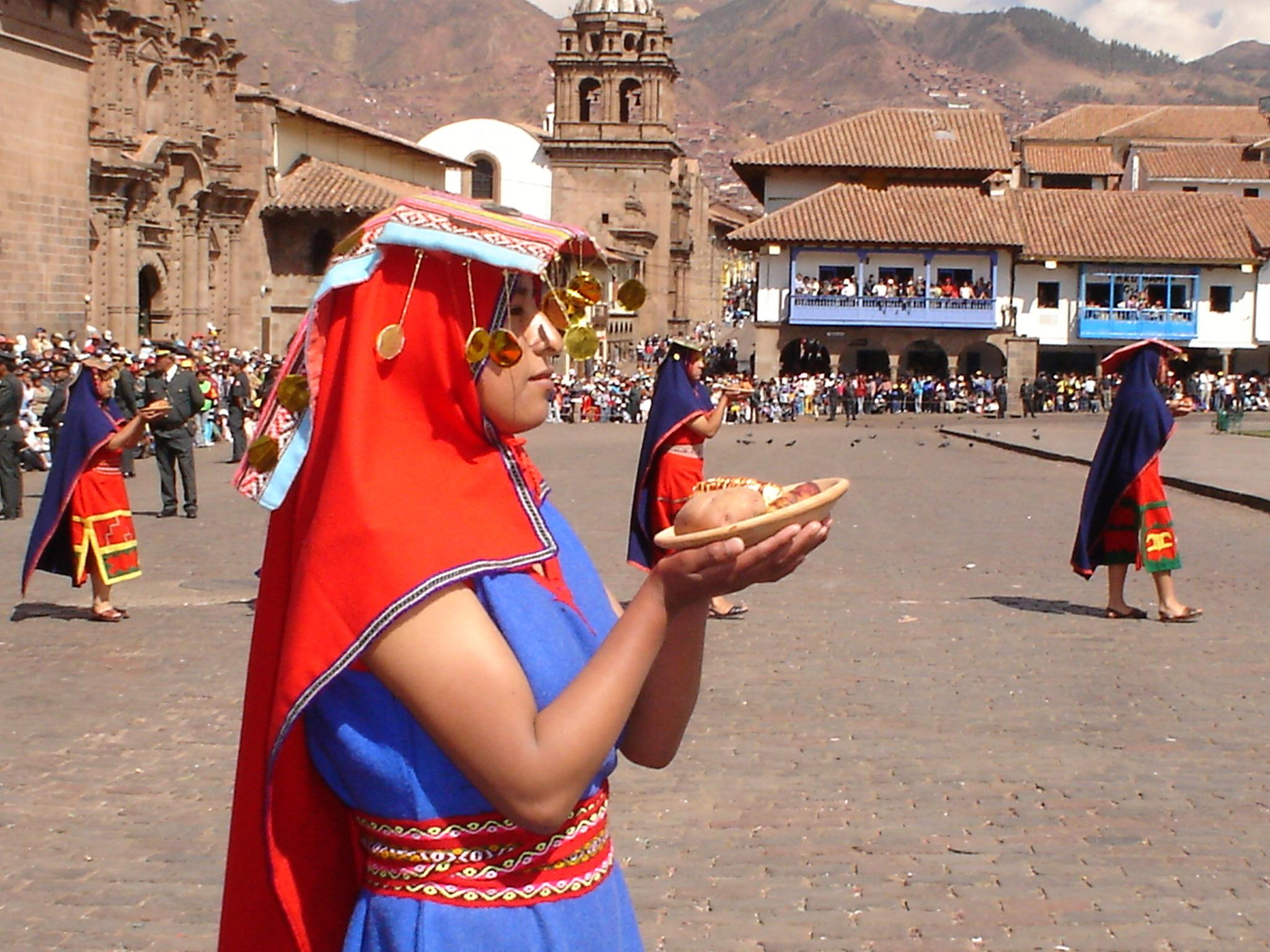
Inti Raymi, a winter solstice festival of the Inca people, reveres Inti – the sun deity. Offerings include round bread and maize beer.

Statues, images and temples have been a part of the Traditional Religions of the indigenous people of the Americas. The Incan, Mayan and Aztec civilizations developed sophisticated religious practices that incorporated idols and religious arts. The Inca culture, for example, has believed in Viracocha (also called Pachacutec) as the creator deity and nature deities such as Inti (sun deity), and Mama Cocha the goddess of the sea, lakes, rivers and waters.

In Mayan culture, Kukulkan has been the supreme creator deity, also revered as the god of reincarnation, water, fertility and wind. The Mayan people built step pyramid temples to honor Kukulkan, aligning them to the Sun's position on the spring equinox. Other deities found at Mayan archaeological sites include Xib Chac – the benevolent male rain deity, and Ixchel – the benevolent female earth, weaving and pregnancy goddess. A deity with aspects similar to Kulkulkan in the Aztec culture has been called Quetzalcoatl.

== Traditional African religions ==
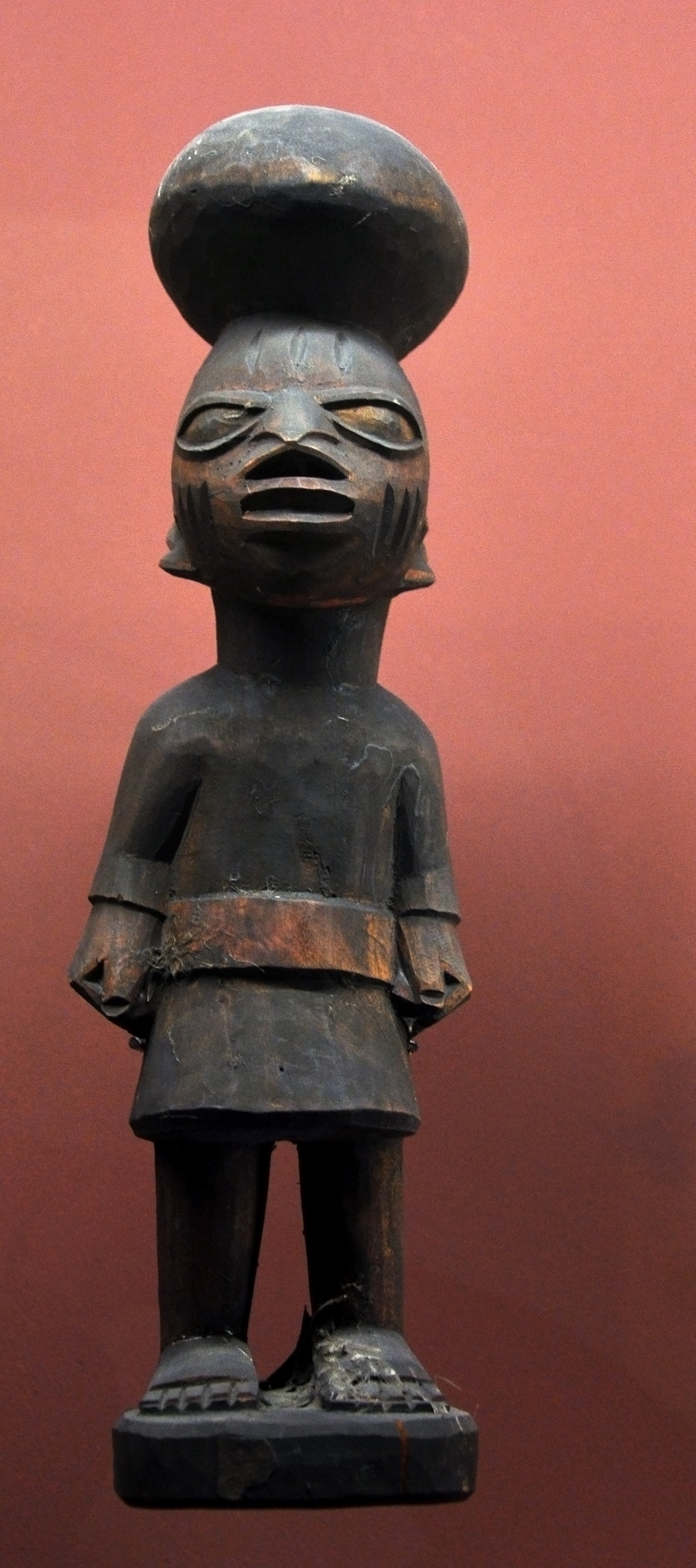
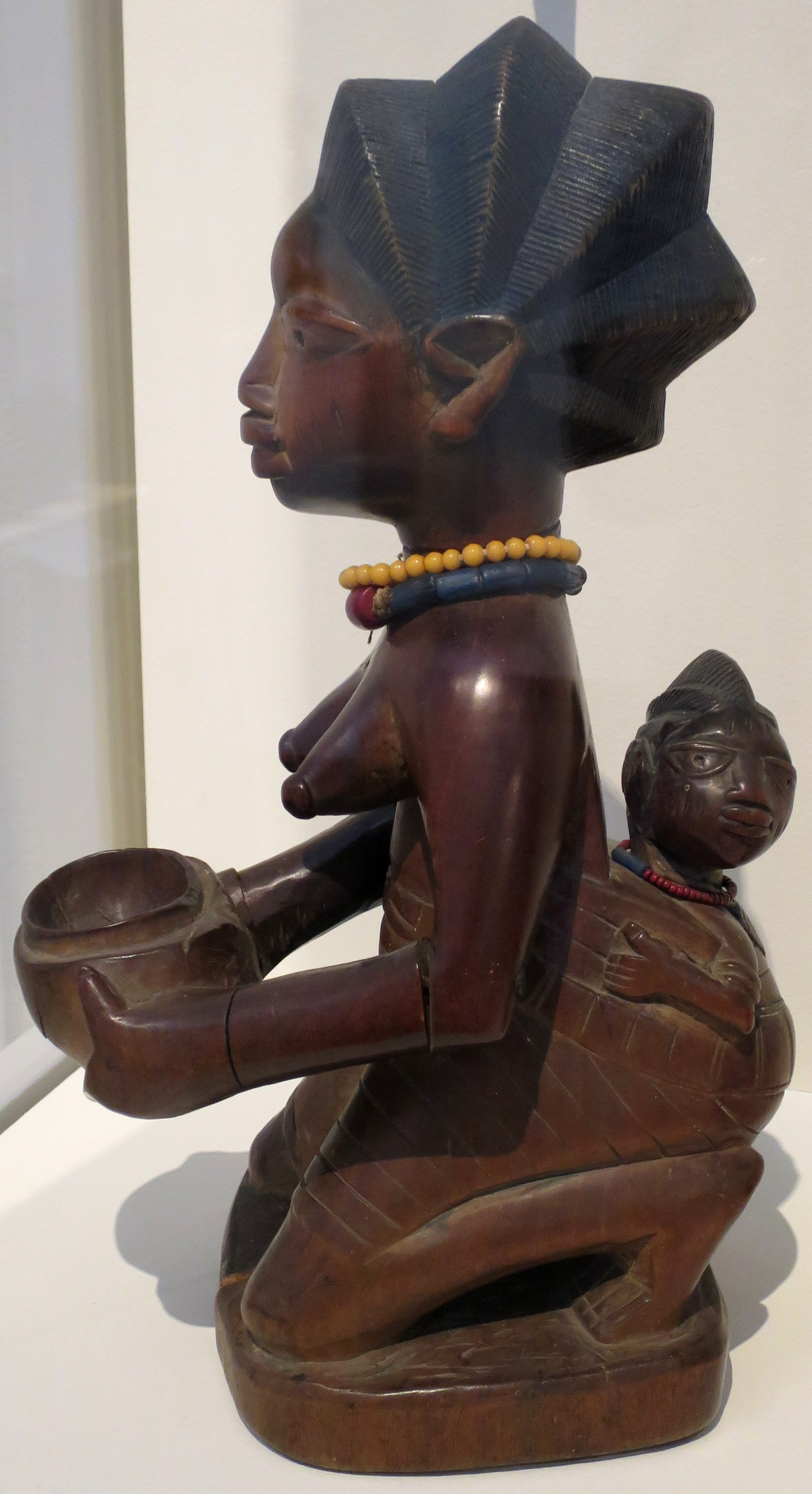
An Orisha deity (left) and an artwork depicting a kneeling female worshipper with child, by Yoruba people

Africa has numerous ethnic groups, and their diverse religious idea have been grouped as African Traditional Religions, sometimes abbreviated to ATR. These religions typically believe in a Supreme Being which goes by different regional names, as well as spirit world often linked to ancestors, and mystical magical powers through divination. Idols and their worship have been associated with all three components in the African Traditional Religions.

== Gallery ==
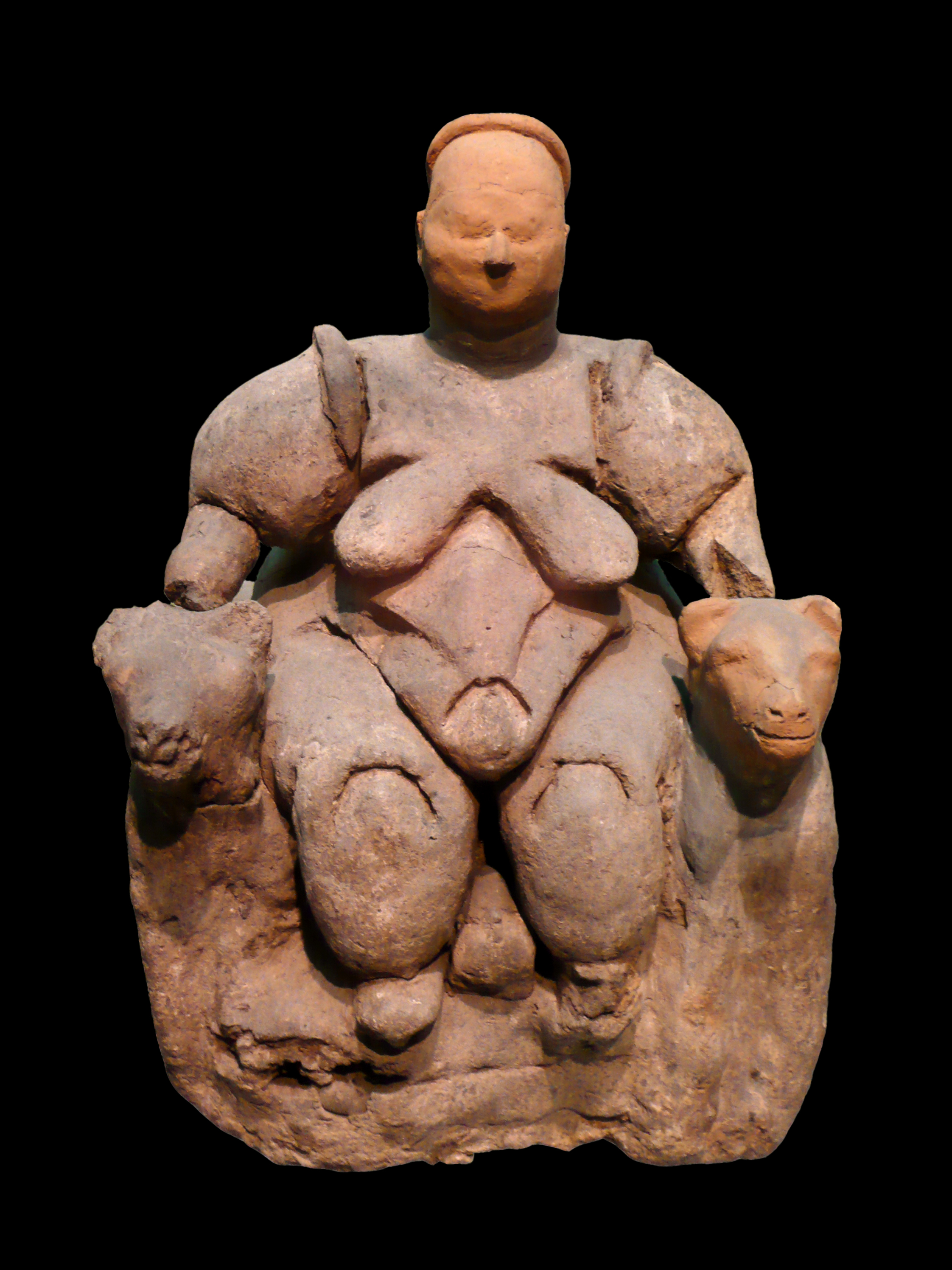
Seated Woman of Çatalhöyük, Konya, Turkey, c. 6,000 BC

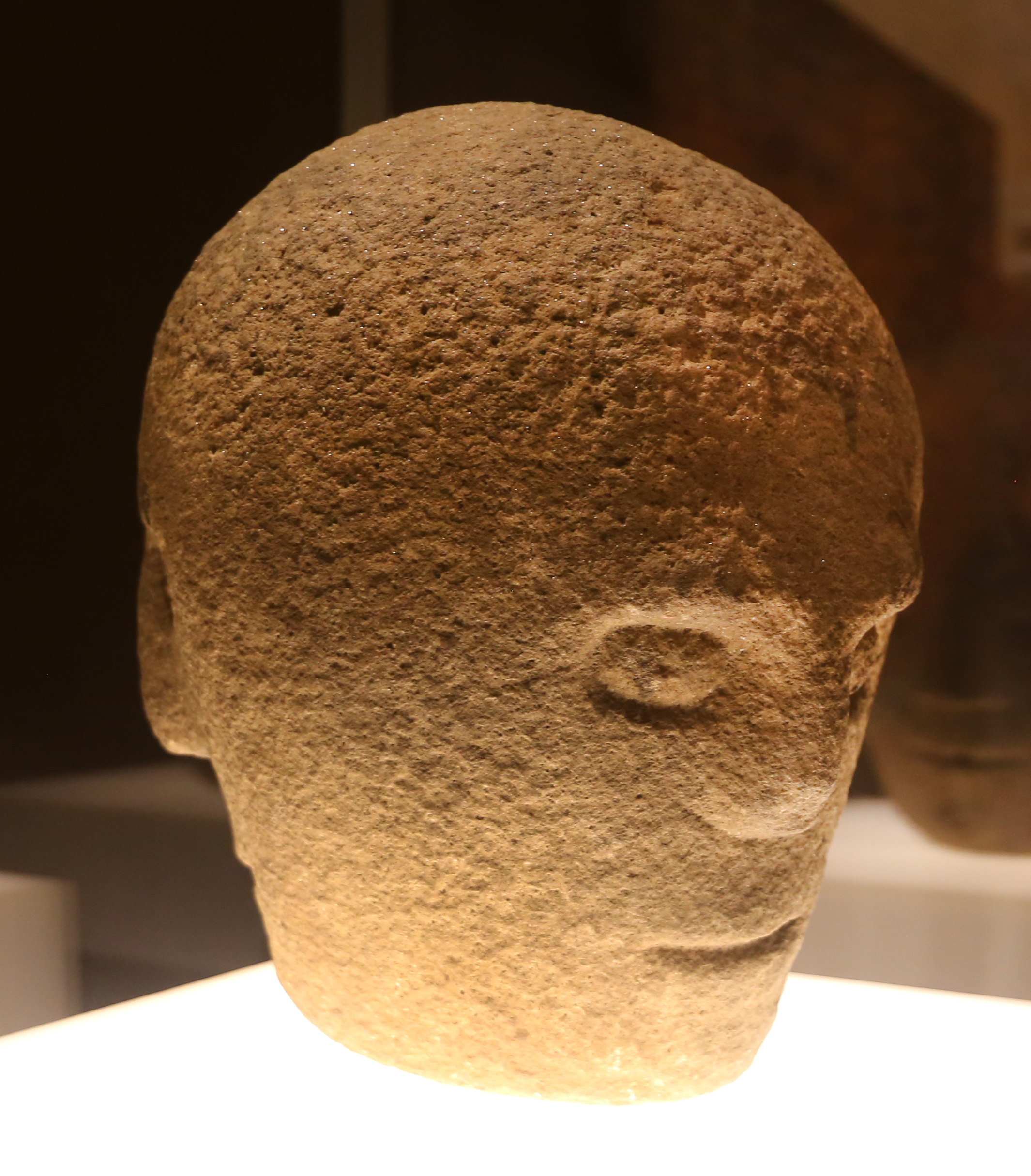
The Corleck Head, Irish, 1st or 2nd century AD

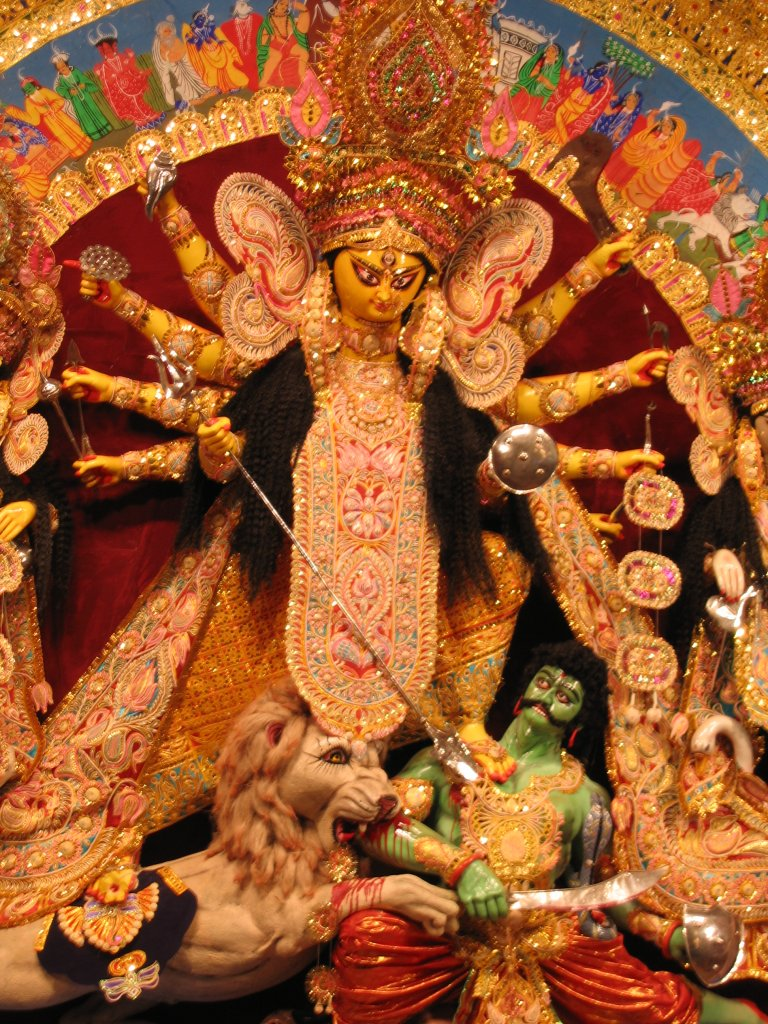
The Hindu goddess Durga

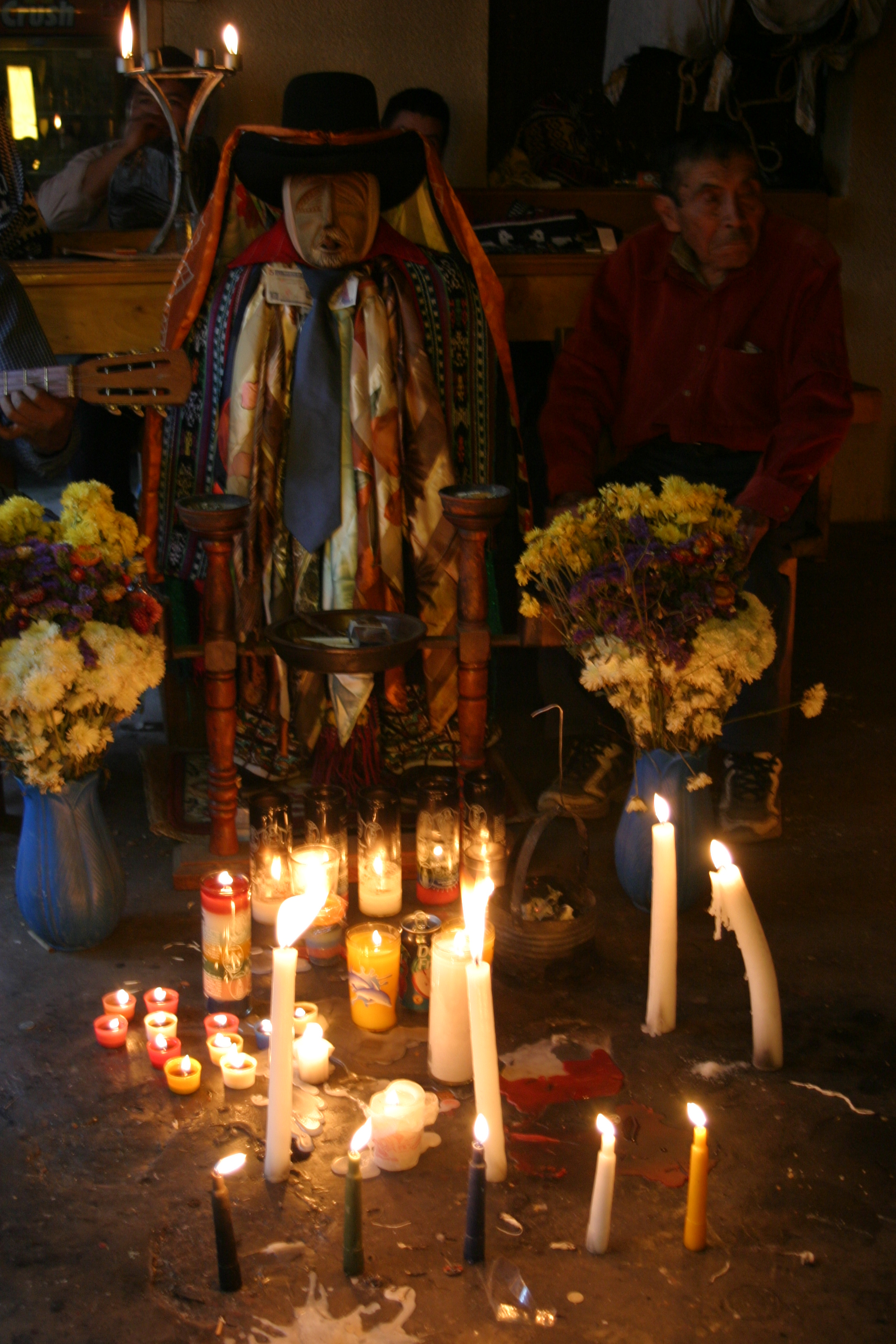
Maximón, a Maya god, Guatemalan Highlands

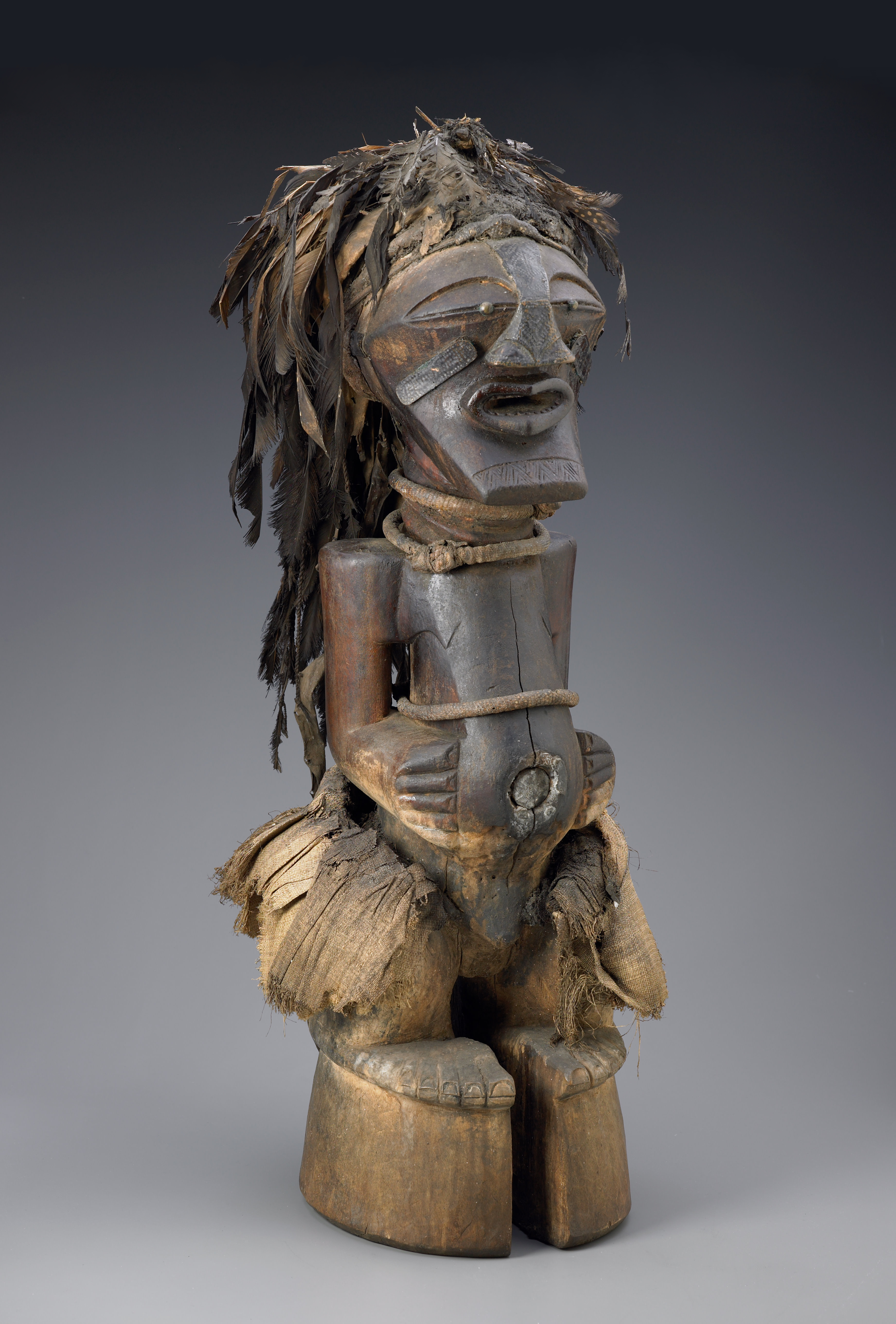
Songye power figure, from today's Democratic Republic of the Congo

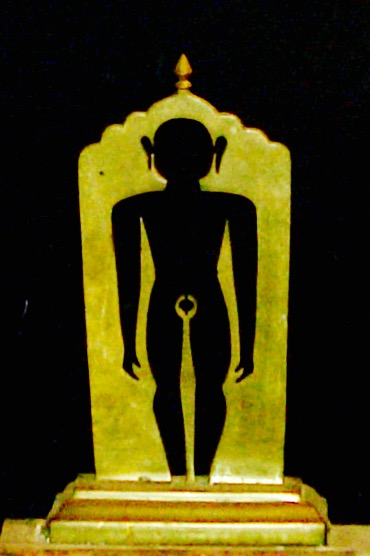
Image of Siddha (Liberated soul) venerated by Jains, India

== See also ==
- Andachtsbilder
- Antinous Mondragone
- Asherah
- Cult (religion)
- Devotional medal
- Fetishism
- Holy card
- Honzon
- Icon
- Iconoclasm
- Madonna and Child
- Prana pratishta
- Puja
- Religious image
