= Mizrah =

Direction of prayer in Judaism

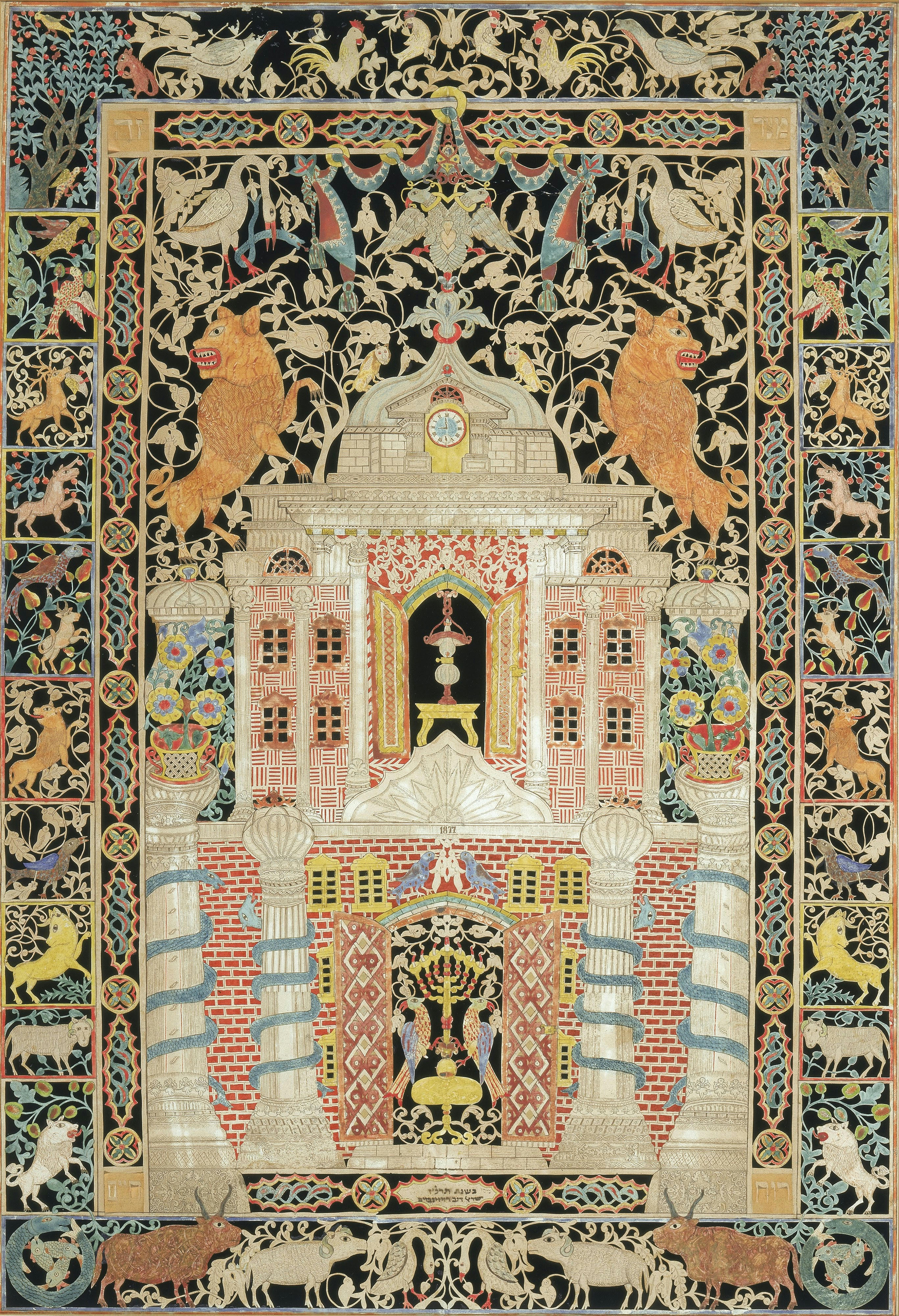
Mizrah papercut, Eastern Europe, 19th century (from Pidkamin, Ukraine)

Mizrah (also spelled Mizrach, Mizrakh) (Hebrew: מִזְרָח, romanized: mīzrāḥ) is the "east" and the direction that Jews in the Diaspora west of Israel face during prayer. Practically speaking, Jews face the city of Jerusalem when praying, and those north, east, or south of Jerusalem face south, west, and north respectively.

In European and Mediterranean communities west of the Holy Land, mizrah also refers to the wall of the synagogue that faces east, where seats are reserved for the rabbi and other dignitaries. In addition, mizrah refers to an ornamental wall plaque used to indicate the direction of prayer in Jewish homes.

== Jewish law ==
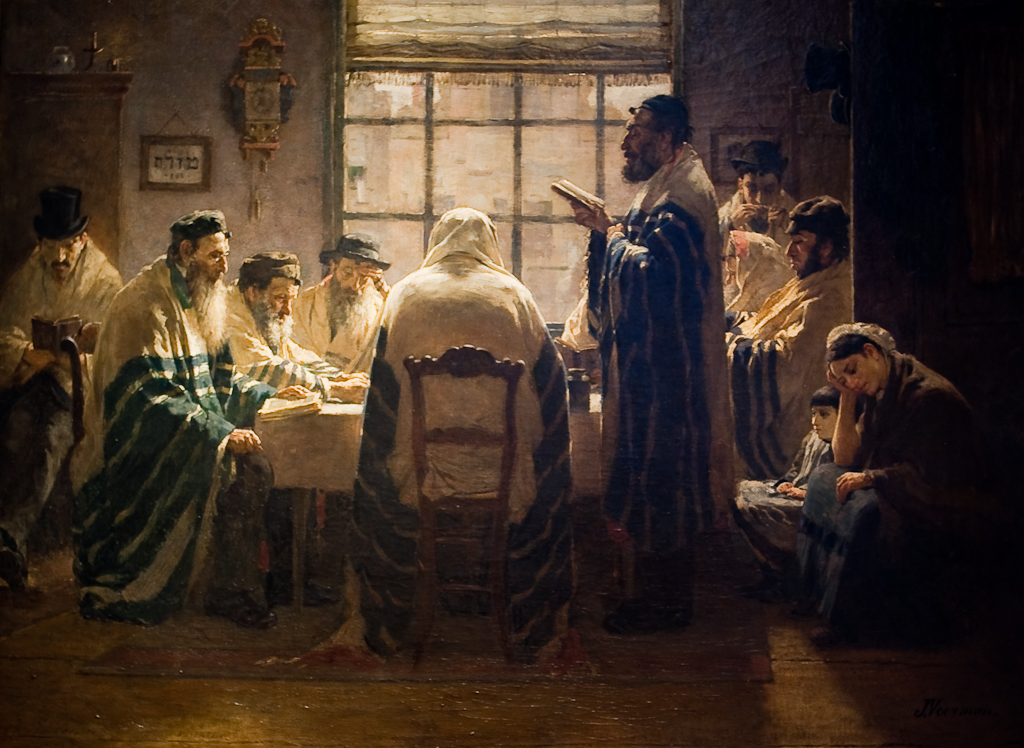
Framed mizrach with the word מזרח on the wall (Jan Voerman, De treurdagen 'the sorrowful days', c. 1884)

The Talmud states that a Jew praying in the Diaspora shall direct themself toward the Land of Israel; in Israel, toward Jerusalem; in Jerusalem, toward the Temple; and in the Temple, toward the Holy of Holies. The same rule is found in the Mishnah but prescribed for individual prayers rather than congregational ones (i.e., in a synagogue). Thus, if one is east of the Temple, one should turn westward; if in the west, eastward; in the south, northward; and if in the north, southward.

The custom is based on the prayer of Solomon (I Kings 8:33, 44, 48; II Chronicles 6:34). Another passage supporting this rule is found in the Book of Daniel, which relates that in the upper chamber of the house in which Daniel prayed three times daily, the windows were opened toward Jerusalem (Daniel 9:3, 6:10).

The Tosefta demands that the entrance to the synagogue should be on the eastern side, with the congregation facing west during prayer. The requirement is probably based on the orientation of the Tent of Meeting, which had its gates on the eastern side (2:2–3; 3:38, or Solomon's Temple—the portals of which were to the east (Ezekiel 43:1–4). Maimonides attempted to reconcile the Tosefta's provision with the requirement to pray toward Jerusalem by stating that the doors of the synagogue should face east and the Ark should be placed "in the direction in which people pray in that city" (i.e., toward Jerusalem). The Shulkhan Arukh records the same rule but also recommends that one turn toward the southeast instead of the east to avoid the semblance of worshiping the sun.

If one cannot ascertain the cardinal points, one should direct the heart toward Jerusalem.

== Mizrah in synagogue architecture ==
Excavations of ancient synagogues show that their design generally conformed with the Talmudic and traditional rule on prayer direction. The synagogues excavated west of Eretz Israel in Miletus, Priene, and Aegina all show an eastern orientation. Josephus, in his work Against Apion, recorded that the same was the case for Egyptian synagogues. Synagogues north of Jerusalem and west of the Jordan River, as in Bet Alfa, Capernaum, Hammath, and Khorazin, all face southward, whereas houses of worship east of the Jordan all face west. In the south, the synagogue excavated at Masada faces northwest to Jerusalem. The Tosefta's regulation that the entrance to the synagogue should be on the eastern side, while the orientation of the building should be toward the west was followed only in the synagogue in Irbid.

Initially, the mizrah wall in synagogues was on the side of the entrance. However, the remains of the Dura-Europos synagogue on the Euphrates reveal that by the 3rd century C.E. the doors were on the eastern side and the opposite wall, in which a special niche had been made to place the scrolls during worship, faced Jerusalem. In Eretz Israel, the wall facing the Temple site was changed from the side of the entrance to the side of the Ark in the 5th or 6th century. This change is found in synagogues at Naaran, near Jericho, and Beit Alfa. Worshipers came through the portals and immediately faced both the scrolls and Jerusalem.

== Mizrah in Jewish homes ==
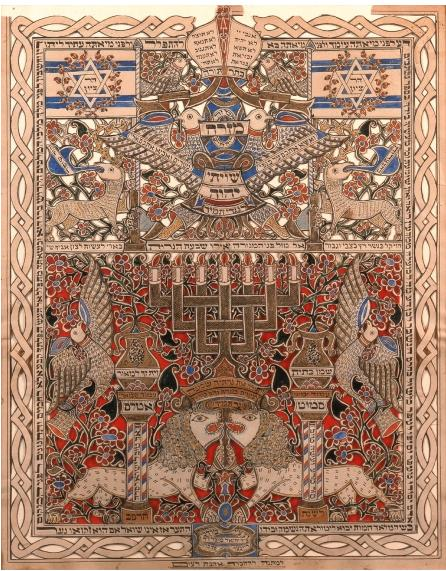
Mizrah-shiviti papercut

It is customary in traditional Jewish homes to mark the wall in the direction of mizrah to facilitate proper prayer. For this purpose, people use artistic wall plaques inscribed with the word mizrah and scriptural passages like "From the rising (mi-mizrah) of the sun unto the going down thereof, the Lord's name is to be praised" (Psalm 113:3, Septuagint Ps. 112:3), kabbalistic inscriptions, or pictures of holy places. These plaques are generally placed in rooms in which people pray, such as the living room or bedrooms.

There are also papercuts described as "mizrah-shiviti", because they served a dual purpose: as mizrah (decoration for the eastern wall, marking the direction of prayer), and as shiviti, meaning "I have set [before me]" (Psalm 16:8, LXX Ps. 15:8) and intended to inspire worshippers to adopt a proper attitude toward prayer.

== Outside Judaism ==
Like the Jews, Muslims used Jerusalem as their qiblah (Arabic: قِـبْـلَـة, direction of prayer), before it was permanently changed in the second Hijri year (624 CE) to Mecca.

== See also ==
- Eastern Wall, the eastern wall of the ancient Temple Mount
- Direction of prayer
  - Ad orientem, the Christian direction of prayer; alternative for Catholic priests: versus populum
  - Qibla, the Muslim direction of prayer
  - Qiblih, the Baháʼí direction of prayer
- Orientation of churches
- Vytynanky (Wycinanki), Slavic papercuts
