= Religious image =

Work of visual art with a religious purpose

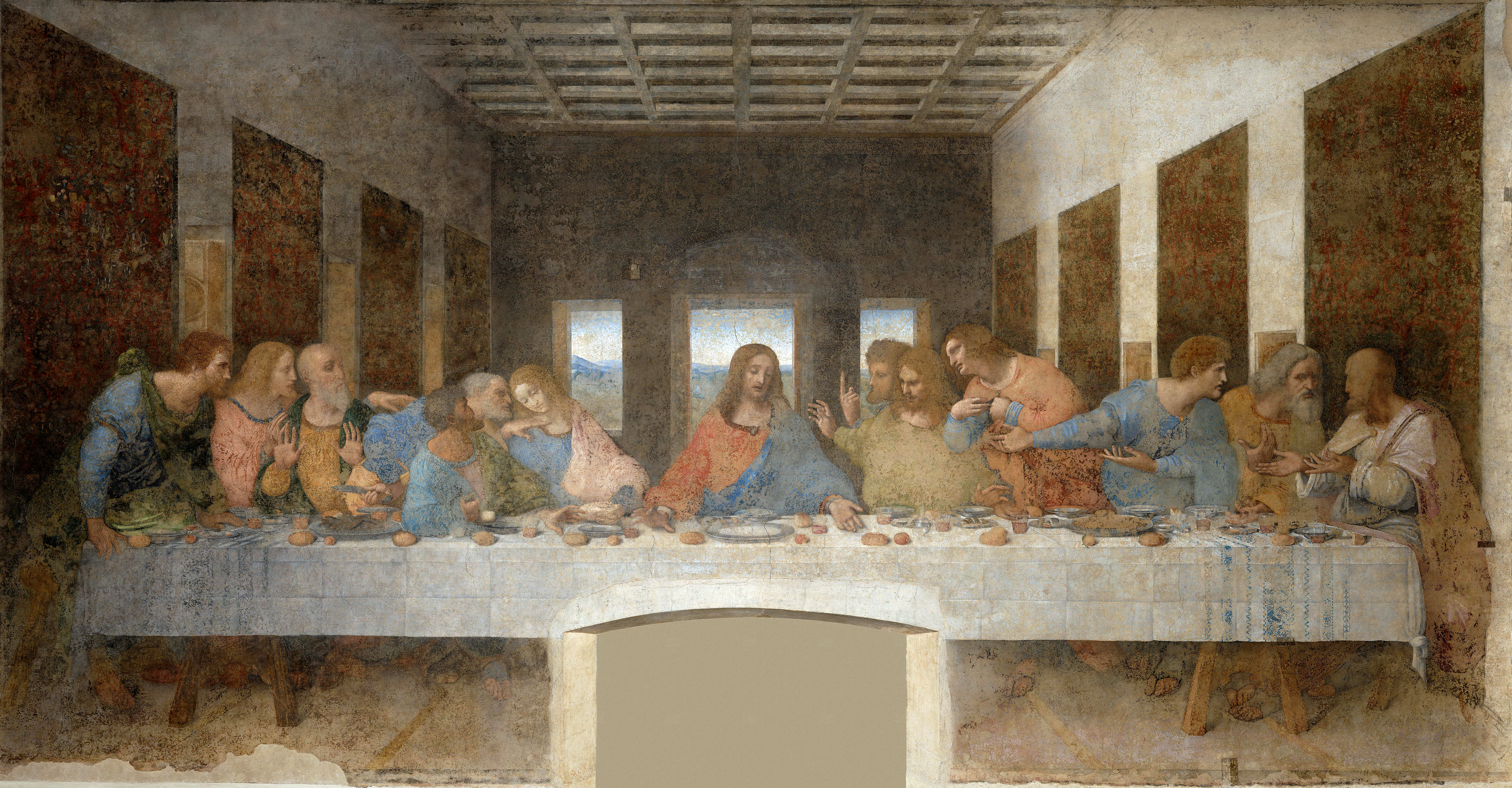
Leonardo da Vinci's The Last Supper (1498).

A religious image is a work of visual art that is representational and has a religious purpose, subject or connection. All major historical religions have made some use of religious images, although their use is strictly controlled and often controversial in many religions, especially Abrahamic ones. General terms associated with religious images include cult image, a term for images, especially in sculpture which are or have been claimed to be the object of religious worship in their own right, and icon strictly a term for Eastern Orthodox religious images, but often used more widely, in and outside the area of religion.

== Christianity ==
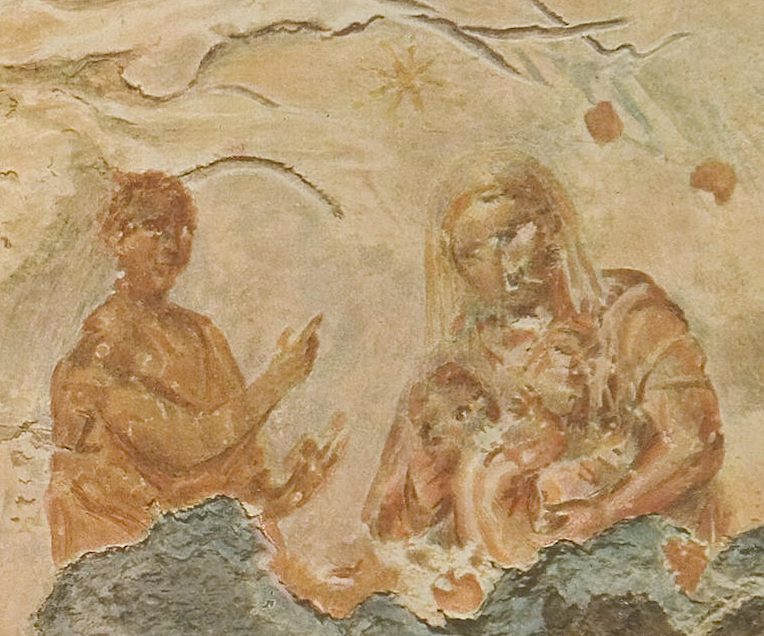
Isaiah (left) predicts the birth of the Messiah from the Virgin. Mary is shown nursing the Infant Jesus. Circa 100-150 A.D., Catacomb of Priscilla, Rome. This is possibly the earliest known image of Mary and the Infant Jesus independent of the Magi episode. Alternatively, the figure at the left may be Balaam pointing to a star. The star is from Numbers 24:17.

Images flourished within the Christian world, but by the 6th century, certain factions arose within the Eastern Church to challenge the use of icons, and in 726-30 they won Imperial support. The Iconoclasts actively destroyed icons in most public places, replacing them with the only religious depiction allowed, the cross. The Iconodules (those who favored the veneration of images), on the other hand, argued that icons had always been used by Christians and should continue to be allowed. They further argued that not only should the use of icons be permitted, it was necessary to the Christian faith as a testimony of the dogma of the Incarnation of Christ. Saint John Damascene argued:

"Of old God the incorporeal and uncircumscribed was not depicted at all. But now that God has appeared in the flesh and lived among men, I make an image of the God who can be seen. I do not worship matter, but I worship the Creator of matter, who for my sake became material and deigned to dwell in matter, who through matter effected my salvation."

Finally, after much debate at the Second Council of Nicaea, held in 787, the Iconodules, supported by the Empress, upheld the use of icons as an integral part of Christian tradition, and the Western Church, which had been almost totally unaffected by the dispute, confirmed this. According to the definition of the council, icons of Jesus are not intended to depict his divinity, but only the Incarnate Word. Saints are depicted because they reflect the grace of God, as depicted by their halos.

=== Eastern Christianity ===
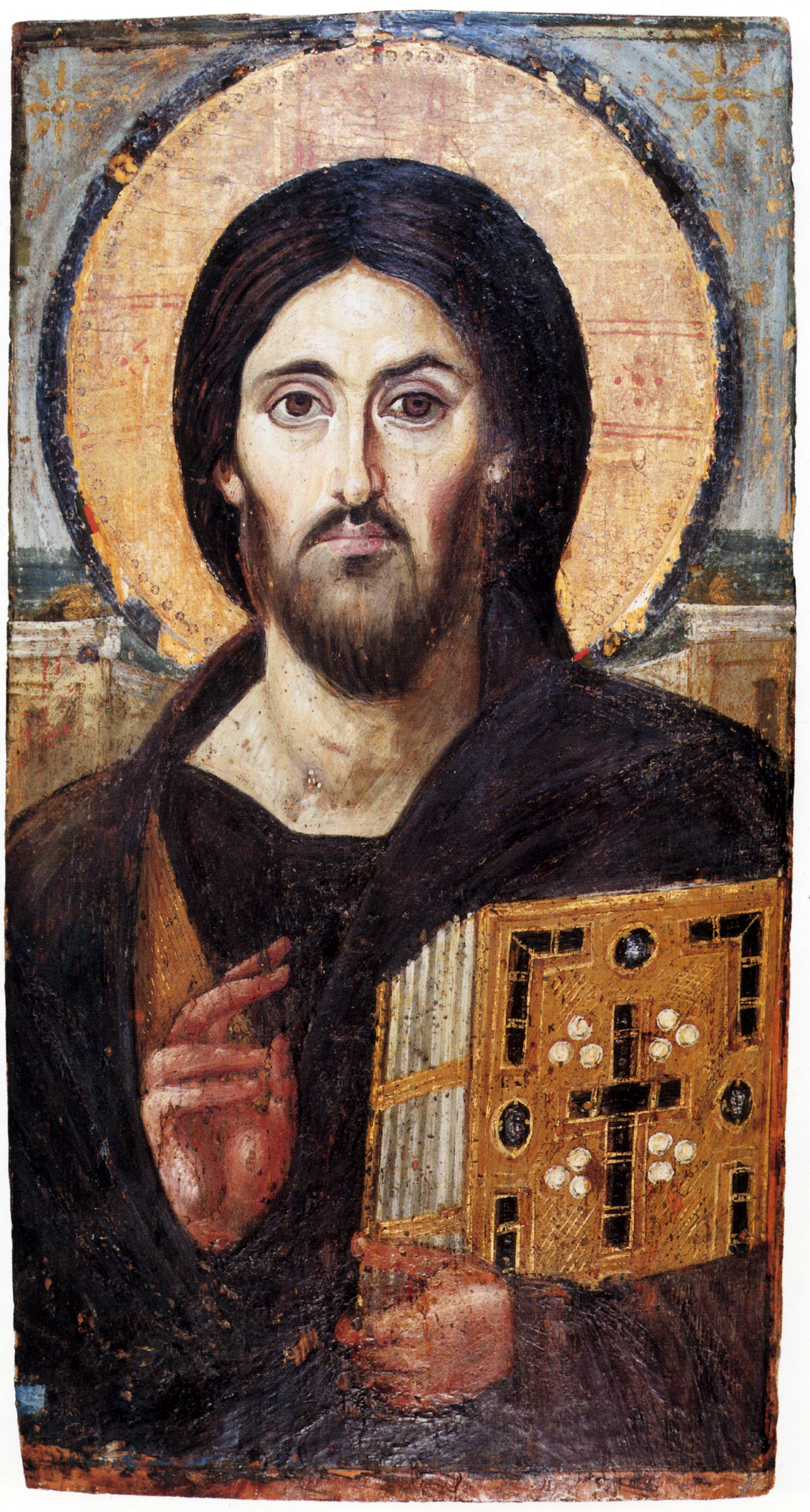
Icon of Christ Pantokrator (Saint Catherine's Monastery, Mount Sinai).

The Eastern Orthodox Church fully ascribes to the teachings of the Seventh Ecumenical Council and celebrates the restoration of the use of icons after the period of Iconoclasm on the First Sunday of Great Lent. So important are the icons in Orthodox theology that the ceremony celebrating their restoration is known as the Triumph of Orthodoxy.

In the traditions of Eastern Christianity, only flat images or bas relief images are used (no more than 3/4 relief). Because the Eastern Church teaches that icons should represent the spiritual reality rather than the physical reality, the traditional style of Orthodox iconography was developed in which figures were stylized in a manner that emphasized their holiness rather than their humanity.

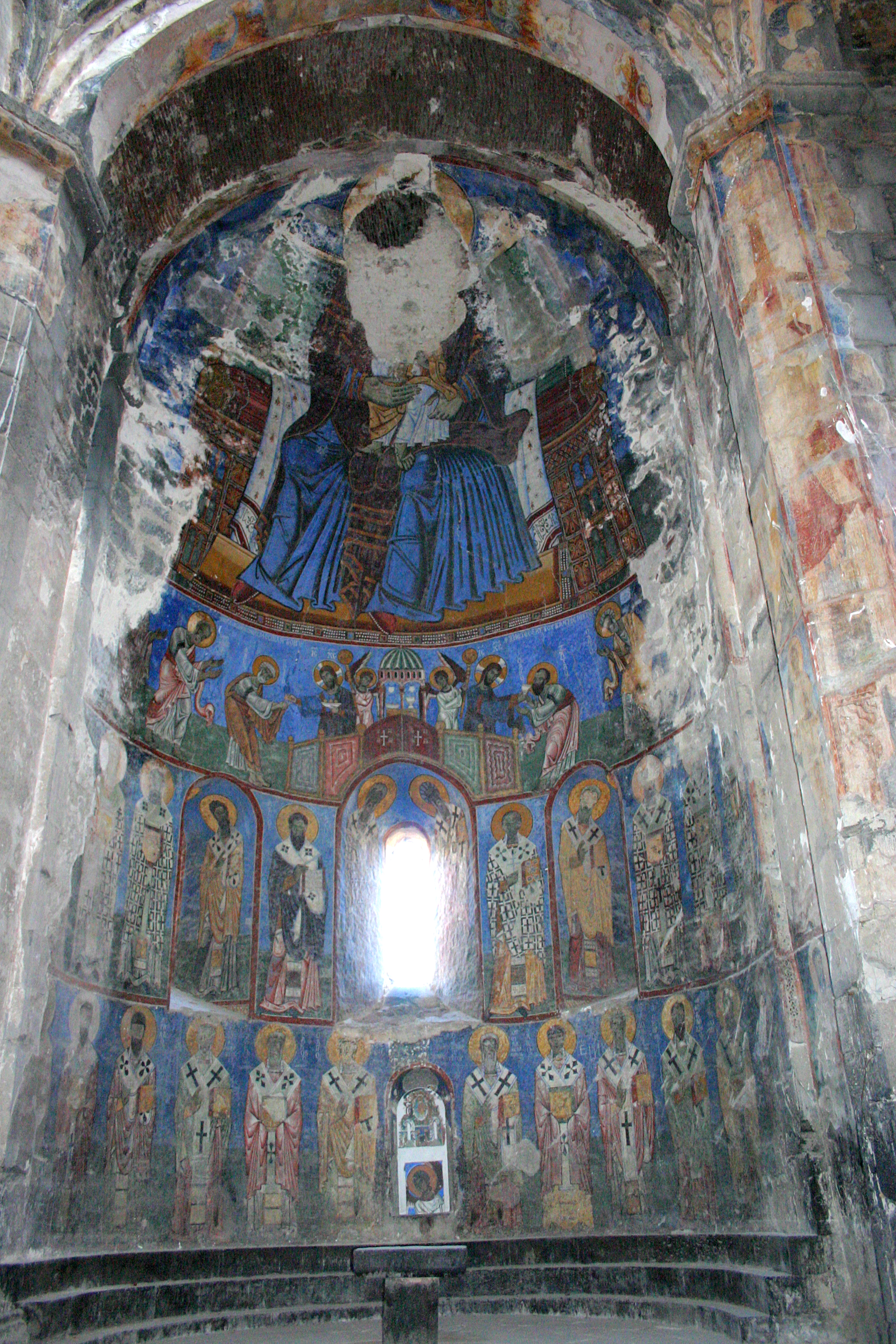
The murals in Armenian-Chalcedonian style depicting Christian saints, Akhtala Monastery, Armenia.

Traditional icons differ from Western art in that they are not romantic or emotional, but call the viewer to "sobriety" (nipsis). The manner of depicting the face, and especially the eyes, is intended to produce in the viewer a sense of calm, devotion, and a desire for asceticism. Icons also differ from Western art in that they use inverse perspective (giving the impression that the icon itself is the source of light), and for this reason make very little use of shadow or highlight. The background of icons is usually covered with gold leaf to remind the viewer that the subject pictured is not earthly but otherworldly (gold being the closest earthly medium in which to signify heavenly glory).

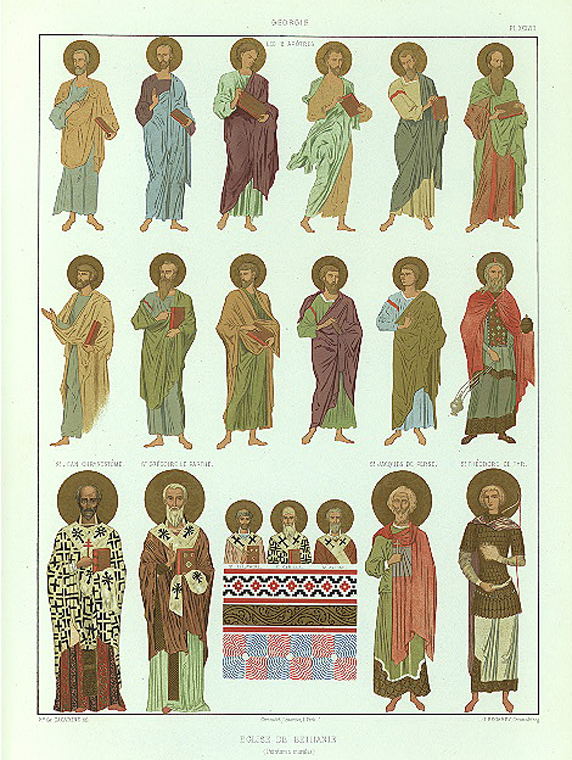
Drawings made from icon murals in Betania Monastery, Georgia, exemplifying classical Orthodox iconography.

Jesus and the Apostles are depicted wearing the robes of philosophers. The precise manner of depicting the face of Jesus and many of the saints is also fixed by tradition. Even the colors used in depicting the clothing of Jesus, the Virgin Mary, and other saints are fixed by tradition, with symbolic meaning attached to each color. Icons of Jesus depict him with a halo that displays three bars of a cross and the Greek letters which signify I AM (the Divine Name which God revealed to Moses at the Burning Bush). The halos of saints, even the Theotokos (Mother of God) are usually simple circles, filled with gold leaf. Over the centuries, painter's manuals have developed to help preserve the traditions and techniques of Orthodox iconography, one of the best-known is the manual from the Stroganov school of iconography in Russia. Despite these strict guidelines, the Orthodox iconographic style is not stilted, and the individual artist is always permitted to bring his own style and spiritual insight into his work, so long as he remains faithful to Sacred Tradition, and many icons display remarkable movement and depth.

The thoughtful use of symbolism allows the icon to present complex teaching in a simple way, making it possible to educate even the illiterate in theology. The interiors of Orthodox Churches are often completely covered in icons of Christ, Mary and the saints. Most are portrait figures in various conventional poses, but many narrative scenes are also depicted. It is not unusual in narrative icons for the same individual to be depicted more than one time.

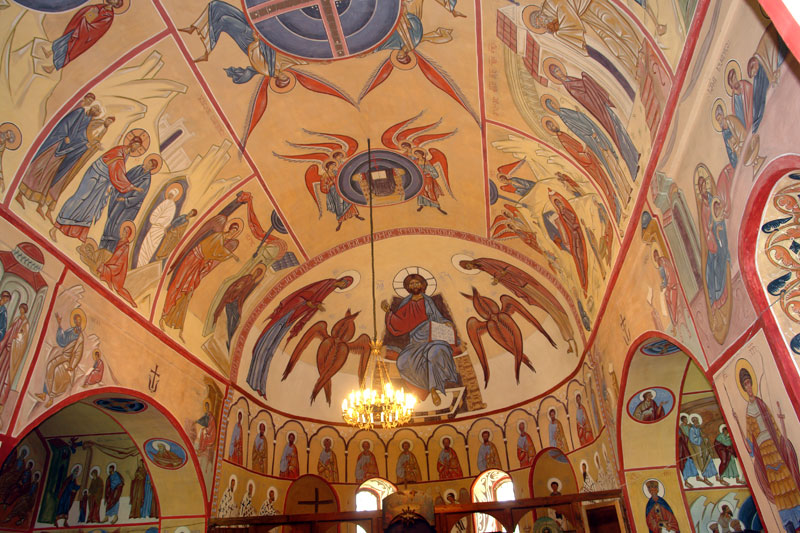
Sacred Tradition determines not only the style of representation, but also the traditional placement of icons in an Orthodox church (Georgian Orthodox Church of St. George in Qax, Azerbaijan

Orthodox Christians do not pray "to" icons; rather, they pray "before" them. An icon is a medium of communication, rather than a medium of art. Gazing at, an icon is intended to help draw the worshipper into the heavenly kingdom. As with all of Orthodox theology, the purpose is theosis (mystical union with God).

Icons are venerated by the faithful by bowing and kissing them. Traditionally, the faithful would not kiss the face of the one depicted on the icon, but rather the right hand or foot depicted on the icon. The composition of an icon is planned with this veneration in mind, and the iconographer will usually portray his subject so that the right hand is raised in blessing, or if it is the saint's full figure is depicted, the right foot is visible.

Icons are also honored with incense and by burning lampadas (oil lamps) in front of them. Icons are carried in processions, and the bishop or priest may bless the people by holding an icon upright and making the sign of the cross with it over them.

=== Western Christianity ===
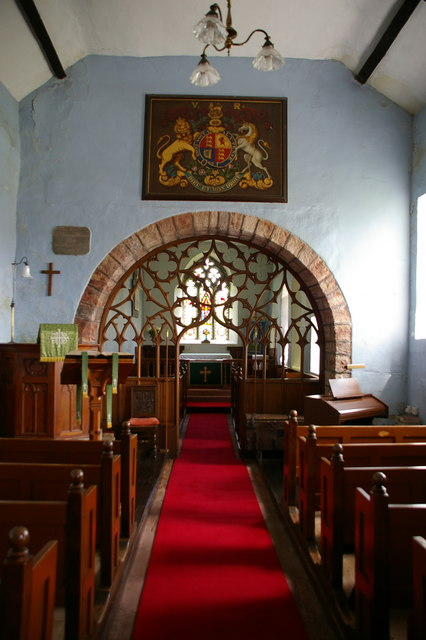
Painting of the Royal Arms of the United Kingdom, in its current form, in the parish church of Bolton in Cumbria, England.

Until the 13th century, icons followed a broadly similar pattern in West and East, although very few such early examples survive from either tradition. Western icons, which are not usually so termed, were largely patterned on Byzantine works, and equally conventional in composition and depiction. From this point on the Western tradition came slowly to allow the artist far more flexibility, and a more realistic approach to the figures.

In the 15th century the use of icons in the West was enormously increased by the introduction of prints on paper, mostly woodcuts which were produced in vast numbers. With the Reformation, after an initial uncertainty among early Lutherans, Protestants came down firmly against icon-like portraits, especially larger ones, even of Christ. Many Protestants found these idolatrous. Catholics maintained and even intensified the traditional use of icons, both printed and on paper, using the different styles of the Renaissance and Baroque. Popular Catholic imagery to a certain extent has remained attached to a Baroque style of about 1650, especially in Italy and Spain.

In the Church of England, the Royal Arms of the United Kingdom has been used like an icon, owing to its absence of human portraiture, as a representation of the sovereign as Head of the Church. It has been carved in relief out of wood and stone as well as painted on canvas and paper.

== Hinduism ==
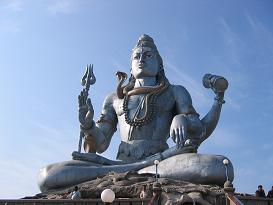
Statue of Shiva represented with his attributes of the drum damaru (right), his trident trishula (left), and his snake Vasuki around his neck

Representations of Hindu deities are rich in symbolism as well as interpretation. Deities are popularly portrayed in the form of paintings, statues, devotional images called murtis, as well as in abstract forms found in the natural environment. Deities often bear a number of attributes associated with them, such as weapons like the discus Sudarshana Chakra of Vishnu, mounts such as the peacock of Kartikeya, sacred objects such as the lotus of Lakshmi, as well as regalia such as crowns and necklaces, and traditional attires such as the sari. Some gods and goddesses are depicted with a multiplicity of features, such as chaturbhuja (four hands) or panchamukha (five faces), both of which highlight divinity. Some deities such as Vishnu and his incarnations are depicted blue, which represents the colour of the sky, with the belief that the deity is omnipresent.

Some of the most common religious symbols in the religion are the Om, the sacred syllable regarded to represent the Ultimate Reality, and the Swastika, a symbol of auspiciousness.

The mode of worshipping deities through religious images is described in Hindu texts such as the Puranas, with prescriptions of the manner in which an image should be installed, consecrated, decorated, as well as venerated.

== Islam ==
Muslims view sanctified icons as idols, and strictly forbid their worship, nor do they pray in front of one. However, the various divisions of Islam take different positions on the role of visual depictions of living (or once-living) creatures, including people. At one end of the spectrum, sects such as the Wahhabis totally ban drawings and photography. Some branches of Islam forbid only the former but allow the latter. The majority of Sunni Muslims permit both. Some Shia allow even the depiction of Muhammad and the twelve Imams, a position totally unacceptable to most Sunnis.

== Judaism ==
It is commonly thought that the Jews absolutely prohibit "graven images"; this, however, is not entirely true. There are numerous instances within the scriptures that describe the creation and use of images for religious purposes (the angels on the Ark of the Covenant, the bronze snake Moses mounted on a pole, etc.). What is important to note is that none of these are worshipped as God. Since God is incorporeal and has no form, He cannot be depicted. During the late antique period of Jewish history it is clear that restrictions on representation were relaxed considerably; for example, the synagogue at Dura Europas had large figurative wall paintings. It is also clear there was a tradition of painted scrolls, of which the Joshua Roll and the Utrecht Psalter are medieval Christian copies, none of the originals having survived. There are also many medieval illuminated manuscripts, especially of the Haggadah of Pesach (Passover).

A unique Jewish tradition of animal iconography was developed in Eastern Europe, which included symbolic depictions of God's attributes and powers as various animal scenes and plant ornaments in the wooden synagogues in the Polish-Lithuanian commonwealth, as well as some mystical imagery on the gravestones. A part of the same imagery also appears on the Ashkenazic Shivisi - meditative images used for contemplation over God's name, not unlike the Eastern Mandalas.

Some synagogue wall paintings contained over 80 various animals, including lions, unicorns, dragons, lion-headed mermaids, three hares, three intertwined fishes, Uroboros, elephants, deer, leopards, bears, foxes, wolves, squirrels, turkeys, ostriches and many others.

God himself was usually represented as a two-headed golden eagle in the center of the Sun, painted on the ceiling of the synagogue, and surrounded by the Zodiac circle. This system was based on the Kabbalistic symbolic tradition; unfortunately, the meaning of some forgotten symbols is hard to recover.

Thomas Hubka has traced the style of decorative painting in the wooden synagogues to the medieval Hebrew illuminated manuscripts of Ashkenazi Jewry, and its meaning to the Jewish mystical literature, such as the Zohar and the works of Rabbi Elazar Rokeach.

== See also ==
- Cult image
- Icon
- Sacred tradition
- Veneration
