= Maya Zack =

Israeli artist (born 1976)

Maya Zack מאיה ז"ק
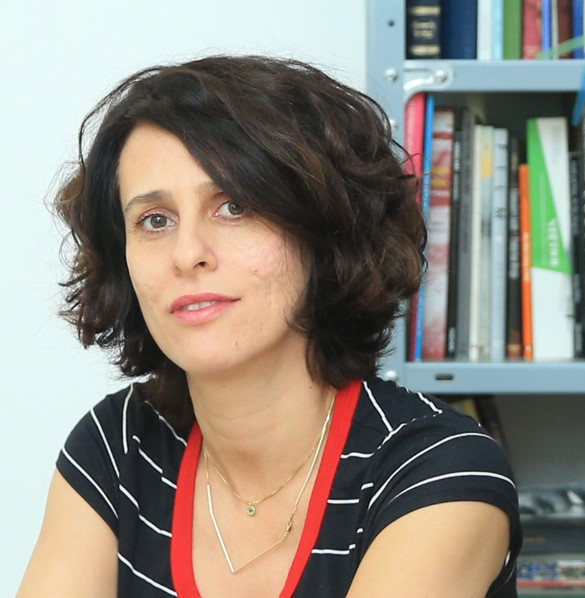
- Born: 1976 (age 49–50); Tel Aviv, Israel
- Education: Bezalel Academy of Art and Design
- Known for: video art, video installation
- Movement: Israeli art

Maya Zack (Hebrew: מאיה ז"ק; born in Tel Aviv, Israel, in 1976) is an artist-filmmaker who creates video art and installations.

== Biography ==
Maya Zack studied at Bezalel Academy of Art and Design in Jerusalem. Her work has been exhibited internationally and earned film awards and art prizes, among them the Isracard and Tel Aviv Museum Prize for an Israeli Artist, Idud Hayetzira Prize – Israeli Ministry of Culture, Adi Prize (Adi Foundation and the Israel Museum Jerusalem), Celeste Kunstpreis Berlin, Israel Lottery Council of the Arts, Center for Contemporary Art Tel Aviv.

Solo/group exhibitions include Moscow Biennial for Young Art 2012, MLF Galleria Marie-Laure Fleisch Rome, Alon Segev Gallery Tel Aviv, Galerie Natalie Seroussi Paris, The Jewish Museum New York, LACE L.A., The Jewish Museum Berlin, Tel Aviv Museum of Art, The Israel Museum Jerusalem, California Center for the Arts Museum Escondido, Figge von Rosen Galerie Cologne.

Zack's videos, installations, drawings and computer-generated visualizations deal with the human attempt to impose order and form onto reality in order to cope with its chaotic nature. Her work reflects on the relation between memory and history.

She is a lecturer at Bezalel.

== Exhibitions ==
=== Solo exhibitions ===
2016

- Counterlight, Tel Aviv Museum
- Galleria Marie-Laure Fleisch, Rome, Italy

2014

- Outlined Absence, Manifesta 10's parallel projects, Taiga Space, St. Petersburg
- The Mystical Shabbat, Alon Segev gallery, Tel Aviv

2013

- The Shabbat Room, a permanent installation at The Jewish Museum Vienna
- Maya Zack : Videos, at Moving Image Art fair, London. With Galleria Marie-Laure Fleisch.

2012

- Made to Measure, Galleria Marie-Laure Fleisch, Rome, Italy

2011

- Living Room, The Jewish Museum, New York, U.S.A. Curator: Aviva Weintraub.
- Camera Obscura, Galerie Natalie Seroussi, Paris. Curator: Marie Shek.

2010

- Mother Economy - video and drawings, CUC Gallery, Berlin. Curator: Avi Feldman
- Living Room, Alon Segev Gallery, Tel Aviv
- Black and White Rule – Open Set, Yafo 23, Bezalel Gallery Jerusalem.

2009

- Reading Room, Bialik House Museum, Tel Aviv. Curator: Marie Shek.

2008

- Mother Economy, The Jewish Museum, Media Center Gallery, New York. Curator: Andrew Ingall.
- Nalbishech Salmat Beton Vamelet, Be’eri gallery, Kibutz be’eri. Curator: Ziva Yelin. (with Raya Bruckenthal)

2005

- Videos + drawings, Alon Gallery, Ramat Hasharon

2004

- Concrete and Cement, Noga Gallery, Tel Aviv (with Raya Bruckenthal)
- Mockument, Alon Gallery, Ramat Hasharon

2002

- The Baron E.T. von Home, Artists Studios Gallery, Tel Aviv (with Raya Bruckenthal)

2001

- Hier seid Ihr zusammen, Kav 16 Gallery, Tel Aviv.

== Videography ==
- Counter-Light (work in progress), 2016
- Black and White Rule, 2011
- Mother Economy, 2007
- Concrete and Cement 2: Door to Door, 2005
- Meme 2. - The Units, 2004
- Meme 1, 2003
- Concrete and Cement 1: Preparations for the Resembling People Ceremony, 2003
- Hier Seid Ihr Zusammen, 2000.

== Awards and residencies ==
- Artis Grant Program, 2016
- Outset Contemporary Art Fund, 2016
- Claims Conference, 2016
- The Ostrovsky Family Fund, 2015
- Israel Lottery Council Grant For Culture and Arts, 2015
- The Shpilman institute for Photography, Tel Aviv, 2013
- Israel Lottery Council Grant For Culture and Arts, 2012
- 'Idud Hayetzira' Award, The Israeli Ministry of Culture, 2011
- Isracard and Tel Aviv Museum of Art Prize, 2011
- Artis Grant, 2011
- Adi Prize for Jewish Expression in Art and Design, by Adi Foundation and Israel Museum in Jerusalem, 2010
- The New Israeli Foundation for Cinema and Television, 2009
- Israel Lottery Council Grant For Culture and Arts, 2008
- Celeste Kunstpreis, Art Prize Berlin, 1st prize Artist Category, 2008
- Israel Lottery Council Grant For The Arts, 2007
- The New Israeli Foundation For Cinema and Television, 2007
- The Center of Contemporary Art Fund for Video, 2005
- The Young Artist Award, The Israeli Ministry of Culture, 2005
- The Center of Contemporary Art Fund for Video, 2002
- Tel Aviv Municipality, The Arts Department, 2002
- Excellence Award, Bezalel, Academy of Art and Design, Fine Arts Department, Jerusalem, 2000

== Publications ==
- Maya Zack: Acting Memory (Arles: Actes-Sud 2015) ISBN 978-2-330-04885-3
- Maya Zack: The Shabbat Room (Vienna: The Jewish museum Vienna and Verlag für moderne Kunst 2014) ISBN 978-3-86984-519-7

== Collections ==
- Israel Museum Jerusalem
- Jewish Museum Berlin
- Tel Aviv Museum of Art
- Jewish Museum Vienna
- Beth Hatefutsoth Museum, Tel Aviv.
- Daimler Art Collection, Stuttgart/Berlin
- ORS Doron Sebbag
- SIP-The Shpilman Institute for Photography Tel Aviv
- Tiroche Deleon Collection
