= Roni Taharlev =

Israeli figurative painter (born 1964)

- רוני טהרלב
- Born: 1964 (age 61–62); Kibbutz, Israel
- Known for: Figurative painting

Academic work
- Institutions: Bezalel Academy of Arts and Design

Roni Taharlev (Hebrew: רוני טהרלב) is an Israeli figurative painter.

== Biography ==
Roni Taharlev was born in Kibbutz Yagur. She is the daughter of the Israeli lyricist Yoram Taharlev and the poet and author Nurit Zarchi. Studied painting under Aram Gershuni and Israel Hershberg in the Jerusalem Studio School.

== Art career ==
In 2012 a self-portrait of Taharlev was included in the BP Award exhibition at the National Portrait Gallery in London and was also exhibited in Scotland and Wales. In 2019 her painting Not This Light, the Other Light was selected for the major exhibition The Moon, from Real to Imaginary Voyages at the Grand Palais in Paris, a ‘first’ for an Israeli painter. In 2019 she also had a solo exhibition at the Herzliya Museum of Contemporary Art, titled White Ravens.

She has exhibited at the Israel Museum, the National Portrait Gallery in London, and at the Grand Palais in Paris. Taharlev is the winner of the Haim Shiff Prize for Figurative-Realist Art by the Tel Aviv Museum of Art (2022) where she also had her solo exhibition Not this Light, the Other Light In 2026–2027, she will be an Artist-in-residence at the Katz Center for Advanced Judaic Studies.

Taharlev's is a figurative painter whose work references classical European painting but with a contemporary twist. Her paintings explore fundamental experiences of identity and selfhood in modern Western society, such as the objectification of women, the limits of gender binaries, and the cultural aspiration for determinism versus ambivalence and play.

Taharlev taught at the Bezalel Academy of Arts and Design in Jerusalem. She lives in Jaffa with her partner, the historian Dror Wahrman.

== Exhibitions ==
Name	Year
Tel Aviv Museum of Art, Beyond Small, Miniauture Worlds in Contemporary Art, group exhibition	2026
Berlin Institute for Advanced Study, ‘The Swing’, solo exhibition, fellow	2025
Gordon Gallery, Tel Aviv, ‘For everyone who tried on the slipper before Cinderella’, solo exhibition	2025
Gordon Gallery, Tel Aviv, ‘Inside Fragonard's Garden’, solo exhibition	2024
Mishkan Museum of Art, ‘Masterpieces’, group exhibition, curator: Avi Lubin	2024
Tel Aviv Museum of Art, I don't want to forget from the collection of Mareva and Arthur Essebag, group exhibition	2024
Tel Aviv Museum of Art, ‘Not this Light, the Other Light’, Solo exhibition, (with catalog)	2023
Rothschild Fine Art Gallery, ‘Berlin-Jaffa’, solo exhibition	2021
Galerie "Fähre", Bad Saulgau, Germany, duo exhibition with Pavel Feinstein, “Self-Portraits and Other Miracles”	2020
Brigham Young University Jerusalem Center, group exhibition,‘Landscape, Portrait, Still Life’	2020
Galeries nationales du Grand Palais, Paris, exhibition ‘La Lune. Du voyage réel aux voyages imaginaires’	2019
Herzliya Museum of Contemporary Art, solo exhibition “White Ravens” (with catalog)	2019
Petah Tikva Museum of Art, group exhibition	2019
Rothschild Fine Art Gallery, solo exhibition	2019
Ben-Gurion University of the Negev Art Gallery, solo exhibition “Undressing the Nude” (with catalog)	2018
Rothschild Fine Art Gallery, solo exhibition, “The Land Where the Lemons Bloom”	2017
Contemporary Golconda, solo exhibition “Virgins and Goldfinches”	2016
The Kubia art space, Jerusalem, group exhibition	2015
Contemporary Golconda, summer group exhibition	2015
Tel Aviv Museum of Art, commission for group exhibition “Blue and White Delft”	2014
Rothschild Fine Art Gallery, group exhibition	2013
BP Award exhibition, National Portrait Gallery, London, group exhibition	2012
BP Award, group exhibitions in the Scottish National Portrait Gallery in Edinburgh and the Welsh National Portrait Gallery in Exeter	2012
Jerusalem Studio School Gallery, Jerusalem, solo exhibition	2011
Rothschild Fine Art Gallery, Tel Aviv, group exhibition	2011
Bernard gallery Tel Aviv, solo exhibition	2010
Engel Gallery, Tel Aviv, group exhibition	2008
Lohamei HaGeta'ot Gallery, solo Exhibition as winner of the Oskar Hendler Prize	2002
Israel Museum, Jerusalem, group exhibition	2000
America-Israel Cultural Foundation, The Helena Rubinstein Pavilion, Tel Aviv Museum of Art, Tel Aviv. group exhibition	1983

== Catalogues ==
- Not this Light, the Other Light, solo exhibition catalogue, Tel Aviv Museum of Art, 2023
- La Lune. Du voyage réel aux voyages imaginaires, Galleries Nationales du Grand Palais, Paris, 2019 (French)
- White Ravens 2015-2019, solo exhibition catalogue, Herzliya Museum for Contemporary Art, 2019
- Undressing the Nude, Ben Gurion University, 2018, solo exhibition catalogue
- Delft in Blue and White, Tel Aviv Museum, 2014, curator Doron Luria, group exhibition catalogue
- BP Award Catalogue, National Portrait Gallery, London, 2012
- Blood Relation, Bernard Gallery, 2009, solo exhibition catalogue
- The Great Illustrators Book, Israel Museum, 2004 (Hebrew)

== Awards and recognition ==
- 2022 - Tel Aviv Museum, Haim Shiff Prize for Figurative-Realist Art
- 2021 - One of the winners of the Rappaport Prize, Tel Aviv Museum of Art
- 2019 - Artis Art Fund, grant to support work in Berlin
- 2012 - BP Award, National Portrait Gallery, London
- 2002 - The Oskar Hendler Prize, Israel
- 2000 - The Ben Isaac Prize, The Israel Museum, Jerusalem
- 1983 - The America Israel Fund Award for Young Artists

== See also ==
- Israeli art
