= Einat Arif-Galanti =

Israeli visual artist (born 1975)

Einat Arif-Galanti עינת עריף-גלנטי
- Born: 1975 (age 50–51); Jerusalem, Israel
- Known for: Photographer, Video Artist
- Website: einatarifgalanti.com

Einat Arif-Galanti (Hebrew: עינת עריף-גלנטי; born 1975) is an Israeli visual artist, mainly known for her photographic and video works.

== Biography ==
Arif-Galanti was born in 1975 in Jerusalem, Israel. Between the years 1995 and 1998 she studied in the Applied Photography Department of the Hadassah Academic College, Jerusalem. She went on to win two consecutive America-Israel Cultural Foundation Photography Scholarships, in 1998 and 1999. In 2002 she studied drawing and painting at The Jerusalem Studio School led by Israel Hershberg, an institution that follows a traditional approach to figurative art. In 2004 she co-founded the Agripas 12 cooperative gallery in Jerusalem, together with her husband Yossi Galanti and other artists.

Arif-Galanti is a lecturer at Pardes High-Art School in Givat Washington. She exhibited 10 solo exhibitions and participated in numerous group exhibitions worldwide, among them at: The Israel Museum, Herzliya Museum of Contemporary Art, The City Museum of Collegno, Turin, Haifa Museum of Art, and Kiyosato Museum of Photographic Arts, Japan. In 2013 she received the Mifal HaPais grant and in 2018 Israeli Ministry of Culture and Sport prize for the Encouragement of Creativity. Her work is included in various private and public collections. She is and author in Untitled magazine and shares a studio at Art Cube Artists' Studios, Jerusalem. Her work is in the collection of the Kiyosato Museum of Photographic Arts, Japan.
