= Rivka Saker =

Israeli art collector and philanthropist

- רבקה סקר
- Born: Tel Aviv, Israel
- Education: B.A. in Economics and Art History, University of Haifa; M.A. in Urban Planning, Technion – Israel Institute of Technology
- Occupations: Art collector, Philanthropist
- Known for: Founder and board chair of Artis, Chair of Sotheby's Israel
- Board member of: Israel Philharmonic Orchestra; Association of Israel's Decorative Arts; Tel Aviv Museum of Art; Bezalel Academy of Arts and Design; Sotheby's Europe; Israel Museum (Co-chair, "Here and Now" committee)

Rivka Saker (Hebrew: רבקה סקר) is an art collector. Based in New York and Tel Aviv, she serves as a chairman of the Sotheby's Israel, and the founder and board chair of Artis. In 2004, Saker founded Artis, a non-profit art organization to support Israeli artists and to create opportunities for their exposure abroad. She has helped support projects by Israeli artists including Yael Bartana, Gilad Ratman, Naama Tsabar, and Ariel Schlesinger and more.

Saker was born in Tel Aviv, Israel. She earned her bachelor's degree in economics and art history from the University of Haifa. Upon graduation, she attended Haifa's Technion Institute of Technology where she received her Master of Arts degree in Urban Planning. In 1982, Saker joined Sotheby's and established the first Sotheby's office in Israel. In 2006, Saker was appointed chair of Sotheby's Israel. She is also a board member of Sotheby's Europe.

Saker serves on the board of various cultural institutions, including the Israel Philharmonic Orchestra, Association of Israel's Decorative Arts, the Tel Aviv Museum of Art, and the Bezalel Academy of Arts and Design. She also co-chairs "Here and Now", a committee for acquisitions of Israeli art for the Israel Museum. In 2013 Saker was named one of the top 10 influential people in Israel's art scene by Haaretz.
