= Joel Morrison =

American sculptor based in Los Angeles (born 1976)

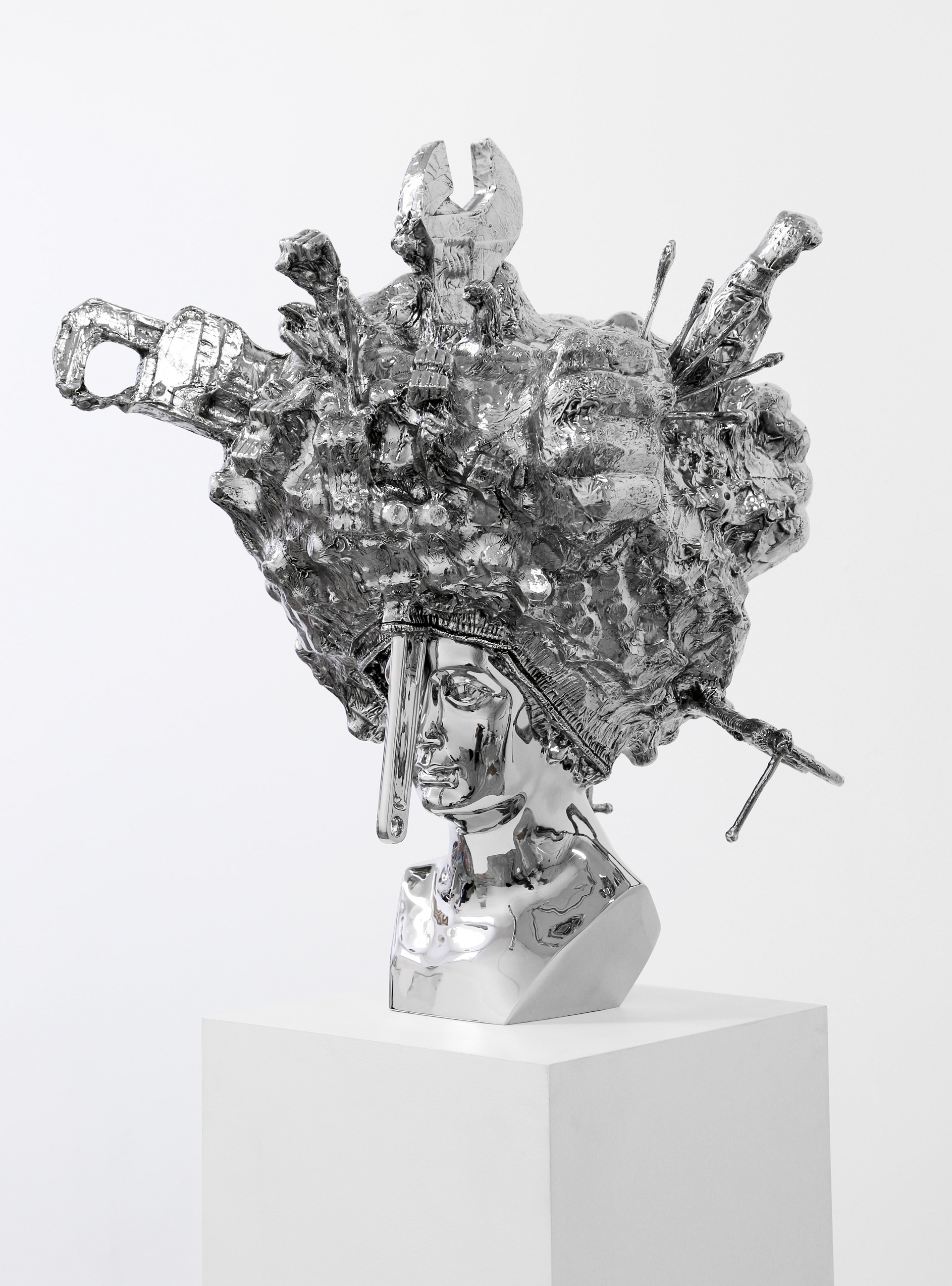
- Joel Morrison - The Side Effects of Thinking
- Born: 1976 (age 49–50); Seattle, Washington
- Education: Central Washington University, Claremont Graduate University
- Known for: Sculpture, Fine Art

Joel Morrison (born 1976, Seattle, Washington) is an American sculptor.

Morrisons' work was shown in the California Biennial at the Orange County Museum of Art in 2006, and in the Thing exhibition at the Hammer Museum in Los Angeles. In 2010 his Six Solos were shown at the Wexner Center for the Arts. The Gagosian Gallery in Hong Kong showed his work in 2012. In 2016 as well as in 2018 his work was presented at Alon Segev Gallery in Tel Aviv.

== Selected exhibitions ==
Morrison has exhibited his works worldwide, including:

- Gagosian Gallery, Beverly Hills, CA, USA 2008
- Gagosian Gallery, New York, NY, USA 2011
- Almine Rech Gallery, Brussels, Belgium 2012
- Gagosian Gallery, Hong Kong, China 2012
- Almine Rech Gallery, Paris, France 2014
- Almine Rech Gallery, London, UK 2015
- Alon Segev Gallery, Tel-Aviv, Israel 2016
- Alon Segev Gallery, Tel-Aviv, Israel 2018
