= Caproni (surname) =

Caproni is an Italian surname.

== People ==
Notable people include:

- Giorgio Caproni, Italian poet/critic/translator
- Giovanni Battista Caproni, 1st Count of Taliedo, Austrian-Italian aircraft designer
- Pietro Caproni, Italian-American statuary reproduction business owner
- Valerie E. Caproni, American jurist

== Other ==
- Caproni, aircraft manufacturer founded by Giovanni Battista Caproni
