= Taharlev =

Taharlev (Hebrew: טהרלב, sometimes Tahar Lev, Tehar-Lev, etc., which literally means "pure heart") is a Hebrew surname. Notable people with the surname include:

- Erela Taharlev Ben Shahar (born 1966), journalist, lecturer, writer, and historian of nutrition and food
- Ohad Taharlev (born 1966), Israeli rabbi and educator
- Roni Taharlev (born 1964), Israeli painter
- Yoram Taharlev (1938–2022), Israeli poet, lyricist, and author
