= Symphony Hall (Boston) =

Concert hall in Boston, Massachusetts

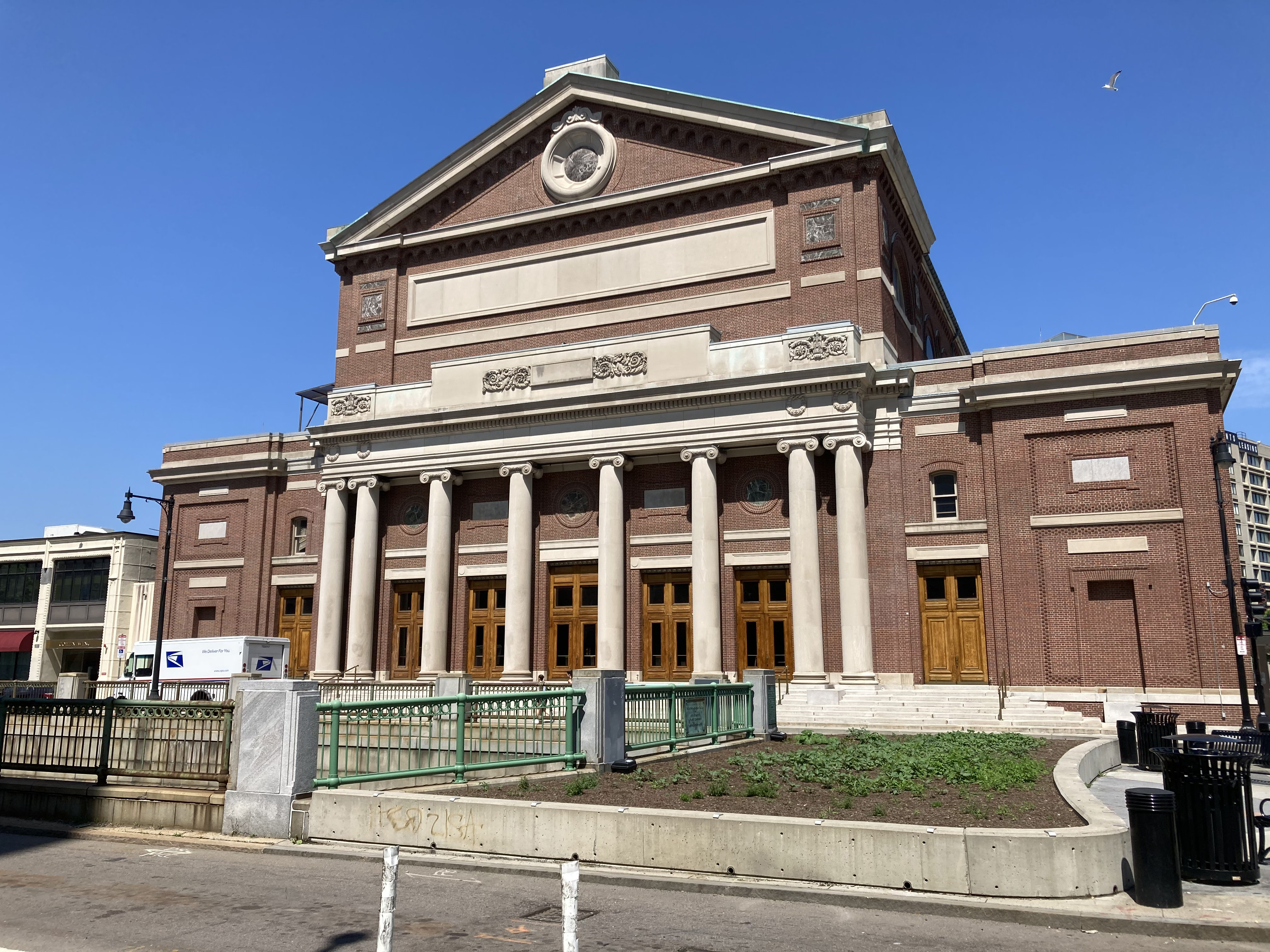
- Front view of Symphony Hall in 2023
- Interactive map of Symphony Hall
- Address: 301 Massachusetts Avenue
- Location: Boston, Massachusetts, U.S.
- Coordinates: 42°20′34.2″N 71°5′8.5″W
- Owner: Boston Symphony Orchestra
- Capacity: 2,625
- Type: concert hall
- Public transit: Symphony, Hynes Convention Center, Massachusetts Avenue

Construction
- Groundbreaking: June 12, 1899; 127 years ago
- Built: 1900
- Opened: October 15, 1900; 126 years ago
- Architect: McKim, Mead and White

Website
- www.bso.org/symphony-hall
- Symphony Hall
- U.S. National Register of Historic Places
- U.S. National Historic Landmark
- Built: 1900
- Architect: McKim, Mead and White
- Architectural style: Renaissance
- NRHP reference No.: 99000633

Significant dates
- Added to NRHP: January 20, 1999
- Designated NHL: January 20, 1999

Symphony Hall is a concert hall that is home to the Boston Symphony Orchestra, located at 301 Massachusetts Avenue in Boston, Massachusetts, United States. BSO founder Henry Lee Higginson commissioned architectural firm McKim, Mead and White to create a new, permanent home for the orchestra. Symphony Hall can accommodate an audience of 2,625. The hall was designated a U.S. National Historic Landmark in 1999 and is a pending Boston Landmark. It was then noted that "Symphony Hall remains, acoustically, among the top three concert halls in the world (sharing this distinction with the Amsterdam Concertgebouw and Vienna's Musikvereinsaal), and is considered the finest in the United States." Symphony Hall, located one block from Berklee College of Music to the north and one block from the New England Conservatory to the south, also serves as home to the Boston Pops as well as the site of many concerts of the Handel and Haydn Society.

== History and architecture ==
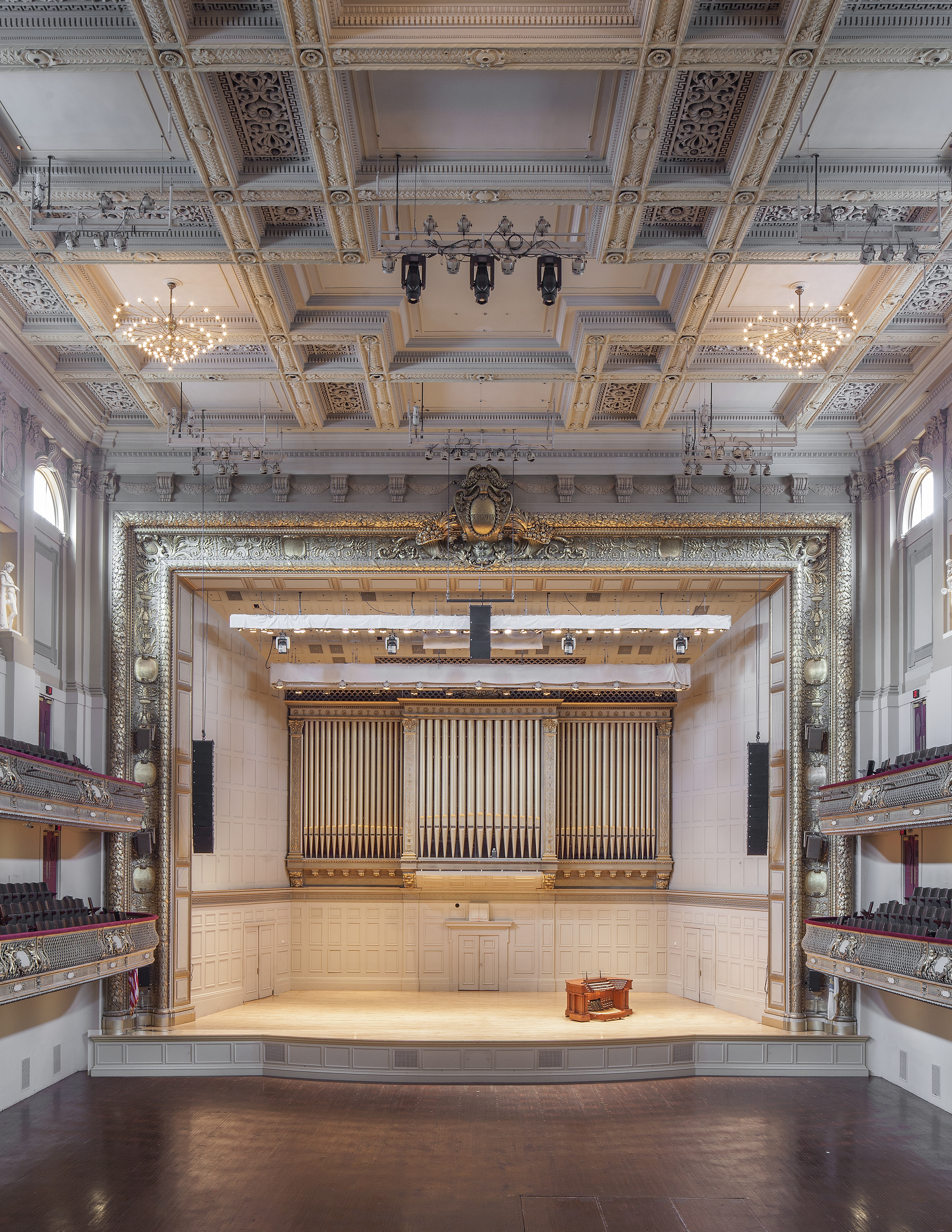
Symphony Hall interior (empty)

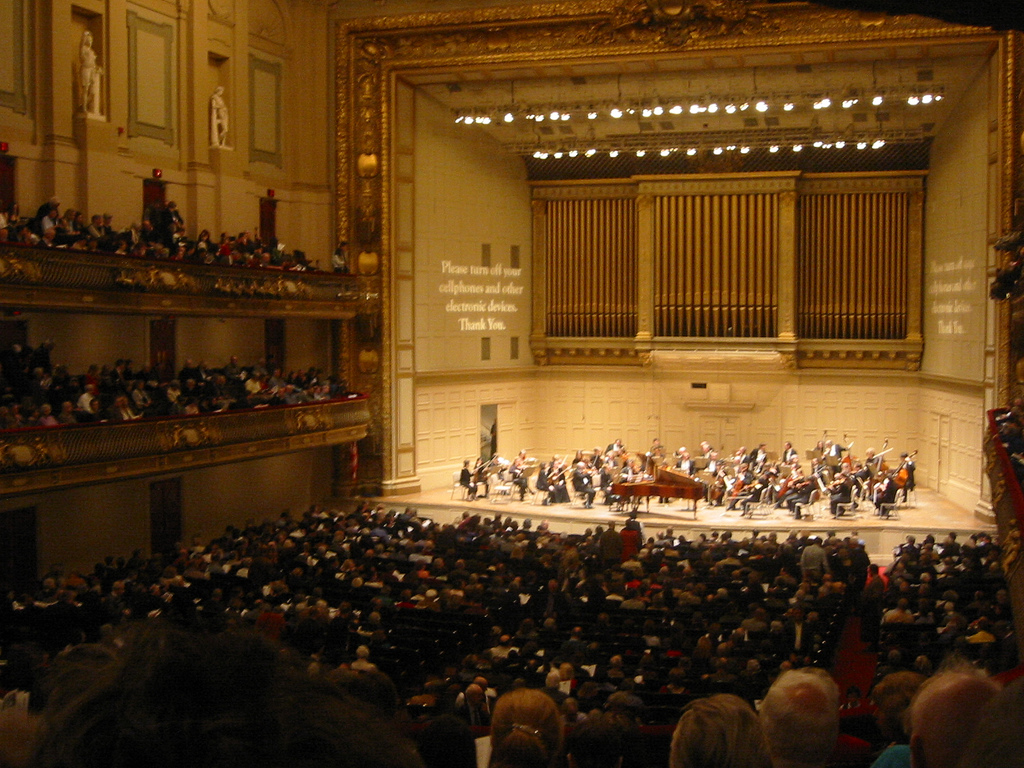
Symphony Hall interior (in concert)

On June 12, 1899, ground was broken and construction began on Symphony Hall after the orchestra's original home (the Old Boston Music Hall) was threatened by road-building and subway construction. The building was completed 17 months later at a cost of $771,000. The hall was inaugurated on October 15, 1900, Architects McKim, Mead and White engaged Wallace Clement Sabine, a young assistant professor of physics at Harvard University, as their acoustical consultant, and Symphony Hall became one of the first auditoria designed in accordance with scientifically derived acoustical principles. Admired for its lively acoustics from the time of its opening, the hall is often cited as one of the best sounding classical concert venues in the world.

The hall is modeled on the second Gewandhaus concert hall in Leipzig, which was later destroyed in World War II. The hall is relatively long, narrow, and high, in a rectangular "shoebox" shape like Amsterdam's Concertgebouw and Vienna's Musikverein. It is 18.6 metres (61 ft) high, 22.9 metres (75 ft) wide, and 38.1 metres (125 ft) long from the lower back wall to the front of the stage. Stage walls slope inward to help focus the sound. With the exception of its wooden floors, the hall is built of brick, steel, and plaster, with modest decoration. Side balconies are very shallow to avoid trapping or muffling sound, and the coffered ceiling and statue-filled niches along three sides help provide excellent acoustics to essentially every seat. Conductor Herbert von Karajan, in comparing it to the Musikverein, stated that "for much music, it is even better ... because of its slightly lower reverberation time."

In 2006, due to years of wear and tear, the original concert stage floor was replaced at a cost of $250,000. In order to avoid any change to the sound of the hall, the new floor was built using same methods and materials as the original. These included tongue-in-groove, three-quarter inch, hard maple boards, a compressed wool underlayment and hardened steel cut nails, hammered in by hand. The vertical grain fir subfloor from 1899 was in excellent shape and was left in place. The nails used in the new floor were hand cut using the same size and construction as the originals and the back channeling on the original maple top boards was replicated as well.

Beethoven's name is inscribed over the stage, the only musician's name that appears in the hall since the original directors could agree on no other name but his. The hall's leather seats are the originals installed in 1900. The hall seats 2,625 people during symphony season and 2,371 during the pops season, including 800 seats at tables on the main floor.

== Statues ==
Sixteen casts of notable Greek and Roman statues line the upper level of the hall's walls. Ten are of mythical subjects, and six of historical figures. All were produced by P. P. Caproni and Brother. The casts, as one faces the stage are:

- On the right, starting near the stage: Faun carrying the boy Bacchus (Roman copy of an original from the Hellenistic Period. Naples); Apollo Citharoedus (Roman artist. Excavated from Cassius' Villa near Tivoli in 1774. Vatican); Young Woman of (Excavated from Herculaneum in 1711. Dresden); Dancing Faun (Rome); Demosthenes (Rome); Seated Anacreon (Copenhagen); Statue of a tragic poet with the head of Euripides (Vatican); Diana of Versailles (Paris);
- On the left, starting near the stage: Resting Satyr (Praxiteles, Rome); Wounded Amazon (Polycleitus, Berlin); Hermes Logios (Paris); Lemnian Athena (Dresden, with head in Bologna); The Lateran Sophocles (Vatican); Standing Anacreon (Copenhagen); Aeschines (Naples); Apollo Belvedere (Rome).

== Organ ==
The Symphony Hall organ, a 4,800-pipe Aeolian-Skinner (Opus 1134) was designed by G. Donald Harrison, installed in 1949, and autographed by Albert Schweitzer. It replaced the hall's first organ, built in 1900 by George S. Hutchings of Boston, which was electrically keyed, with 62 ranks of nearly 4,000 pipes set in a chamber 12 feet (3.7 m) deep and 40 feet (12 m) high. The Hutchings organ had fallen out of fashion by the 1940s when lighter, clearer tones became preferred. E. Power Biggs, often a featured organist for the orchestra, lobbied hard for a thinner bass sound and accentuated treble.

The 1949 Aeolian-Skinner reused and modified more than 60% of the existing Hutchings pipes and added 600 new pipes in a Positive division. The original diapason pipes, 32 feet (9.8 m) in length, were reportedly sawed into manageable pieces for disposal in 1948.

In 2003, the organ was thoroughly overhauled by Foley-Baker Inc., reusing its chassis and many pipes, but enclosing the Bombarde and adding to it the long-desired Principal (diapason) pipes, adding a new Solo division, and reworking its chamber for better sound projection. The original 1949 four-manual console was replaced with a low-profile three-manual console, to allow a better line of sight between the organist and the conductor when the organ and orchestra play together.

== See also ==
- List of concert halls
- List of National Historic Landmarks in Boston
- National Register of Historic Places listings in southern Boston, Massachusetts
