= Ariel Schlesinger =

Ariel Schlesinger (Hebrew: אריאל שליסינגר; born 1980, Jerusalem) lives and works in Berlin, New York and Quito known for sculptures, installations, and engineered systems that explore precarious material states and the interplay between human and nonhuman forces.

Schlesinger's work unfolds as a negotiation between material fact and improbable survival. Across sculptures, films, and engineered systems, he collaborates with materials—gas, fire, air, water—not as inert matter, but as agents whose own behaviors structure form, time, and risk. Objects in Schlesinger's world are neither dead things nor metaphors; they are companions in a precarious architecture where life, collapse, endurance, and memory are inseparable. His practice stages not monumental gestures, but subtle deflections: improbable continuities that emerge where combustion flickers, pressure destabilizes, or infrastructure quietly gives way.

Rather than engineering stability, Schlesinger constructs provisional systems where matter acts with its own logic—fraying, sustaining, failing—without narrative closure. This material intelligence carries the ethical weight of an Arendtian world: one where human and nonhuman forces shape each other, where history materializes not as record but as rupture, displacement, and fragile construction. Violence in Schlesinger's work does not erupt as spectacle; it circulates atmospherically, engineered into ordinary objects, slow infrastructures, and unseen thresholds, echoing the conditions that TJ Demos has mapped across ecological and political terrains.

== Life and work ==
Schlesinger did not complete high school. After leaving high school at the age of 16, Schlesinger spent a period in Santa Cruz, California, where he apprenticed with Masao Sato, a Japanese carpenter. The techniques, material sensitivity, and work ethic characteristic of traditional Japanese carpentry have remained central to Schlesinger's practice. Rather than treating materials as inert, Schlesinger engages with them as active agents whose behaviors—combustion, pressure, instability—shape form, time, and risk in his work. (Temple Solitude)

Since 1997, Schlesinger has also maintained long-term relationships with Latin America, particularly Mexico, Ecuador, and Cuba. In 2021, he established a studio in Ecuador, where he works regularly. His experience in the region, marked by material limitations and inventive forms of production, has influenced his approach to constructing provisional systems that emphasize endurance, fragility, and improvisation.

Between 1999 and 2003, Schlesinger studied at the Bezalel Academy of Art and Design in Jerusalem and at the School of Visual Arts in New York City. After graduation, he moved to Berlin, where he has lived for several years. He has participated in artist residencies in Germany, France, Italy, and Japan. In 2012, he was named "VHV-Artist of the Year" by the German insurance company VHV Group, receiving a €25,000 prize."Ariel Schlesinger ist VHV-Künstler des Jahres 2012". HAZ – Hannoversche Allgemeine (in German). Archived from the original on 2016-10-08.

Schlesinger's practice engages with materials—such as gas, fire, air, water, and industrial objects—not as static elements but as active participants in contingent architectures. Across sculptures, films, and installations, he constructs systems that emphasize the potential for collapse, endurance, and transformation. In A Car Full of Gas (2012), two gas canisters are placed in the front seats of a vintage Mini car, with a small flame flickering from a window, creating a precarious equilibrium between order and catastrophe.

== Selected exhibitions ==
Alongside many group exhibitions, Schlesinger has had a large number of solo shows since his graduation in 2003—in Israel, Italy, Germany, Belgium, Switzerland, Slovenia and France.

- 2003: Herzliya Museum of Contemporary Art
- 2005, 2009, 2013, 2014 and 2016: Dvir Gallery, Tel Aviv
- 2007: Galleria Klerkx, Milan
- 2008: 2010 and 2014: Galerija Gregor Podnar, Berlin and Ljublijana
- 2011: Musée du Chateau de Montbeliard, Montbeliard; Kunstverein, Braunschweig
- 2012: Yvon Lambert, Paris; Sint-Lukasgalerie, Brussels; Künstlerhaus, Bremen
- 2014: Kunsthaus Baselland, Muttenz
- 2015: Galleria Massimo Minini, Brescia
