= Sigalit Landau =

Israeli sculptor, video and installation artist (born 1969)

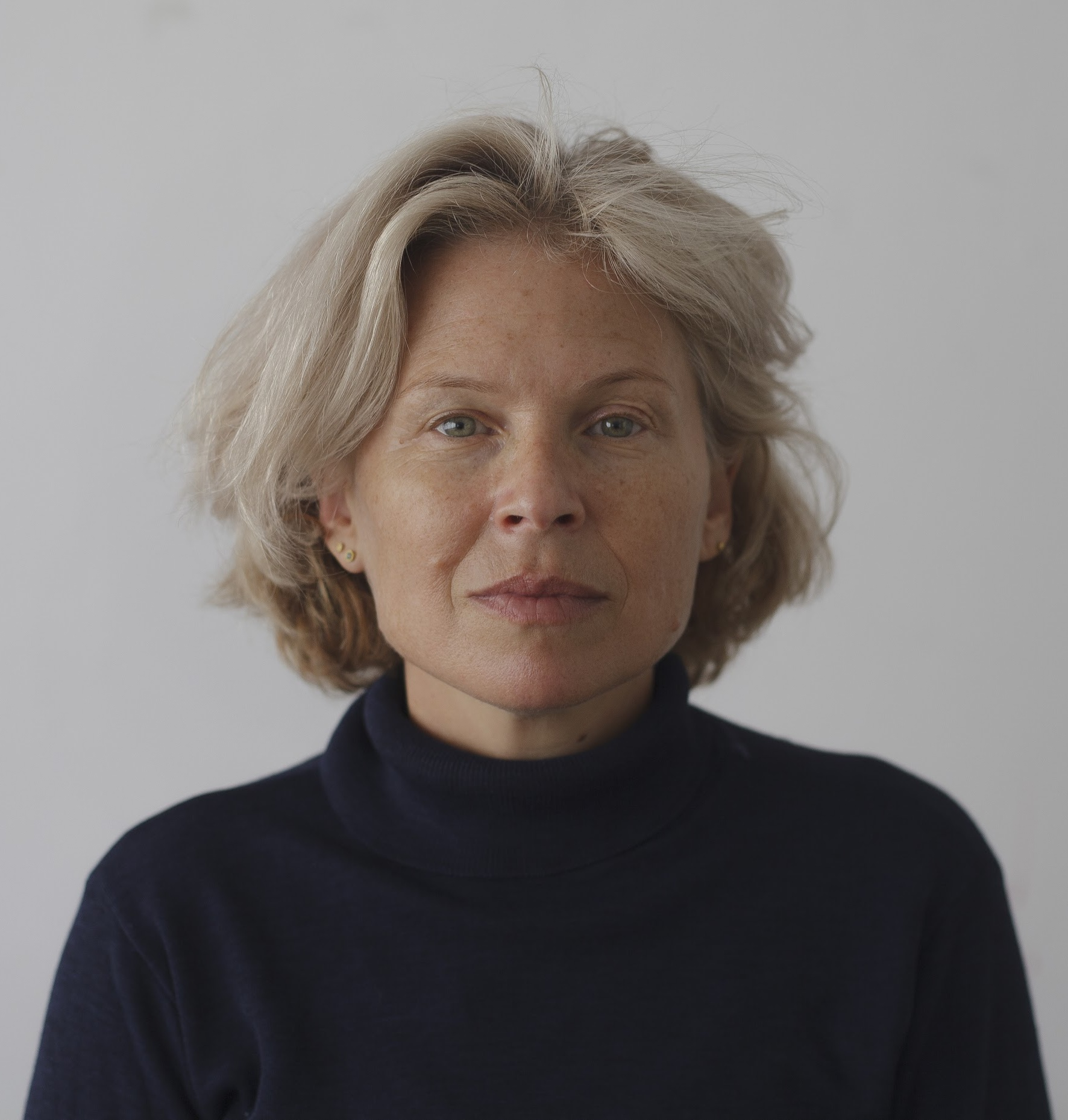
- Landau in 2018
- Born: Sigalit Landau; 1969 (age 56–57); Jerusalem, Israel
- Known for: Sculpting; video art
- Movement: Contemporary art
- Relatives: Christopher Landau (cousin)

Sigalit Landau (Hebrew: סיגלית לנדאו; born 1969) is an Israeli multidisciplinary artist, whose work include sculptor, video, installation art and photography. Widely regarded as one of Israel's leading contemporary artists, her multidisciplinary practice explores themes of memory, identity, borders, migration, conflict, the human body, gender, ecology, and cultural history.

Throughout her career Landau has represented Israel at major international exhibitions, Such as the 54th Venice Biennale (2011), Documenta X (1998) and has participated in major biennials, triennials, and museum exhibitions. Her work has been exhibited at institutions including the Centre Pompidou in Paris, the Museum of Modern Art (MoMA) in New York, the Tel Aviv Museum of Art, the Israel Museum, the Brooklyn Museum, the Jewish Museum in New York, Magasin III in Stockholm, the Martin-Gropius-Bau in Berlin, and MACBA (Barcelona).

Landau is known for her long-term artistic engagement with the Dead Sea. Beginning in the early 2000s, she developed a body of work in which everyday objects—including garments, musical instruments, and barbed wire—are submerged in the hypersaline waters of the Dead Sea, where naturally occurring salt crystals gradually transform them into sculptural forms.

== Early life and education ==
Landau was born in Jerusalem in 1969 and spent her childhood in a family that combined scientific, cultural, and artistic interests. Growing up in Israel during periods of political tension and rapid social change profoundly influenced her artistic practice. Many of her works examine borders, displacement, collective memory. The physical and psychological consequences of Vulnerability are themes that have remained central to her art.

As a child, Landau spent considerable time around the Dead Sea, whose unique landscape, geological formations, and extreme environmental conditions would later become one of the subjects of her artistic practice. The region's mixture of natural beauty, historical symbolism, ecological fragility, and geopolitical complexity has intrigued her as a recurring source of inspiration.

Landau studied at the Bezalel Academy of Arts and Design in Jerusalem between 1990 and 1995, where she specialized in fine art and sculpture. During her studies she began developing an interdisciplinary approach that combined installation, performance, video, and sculpture while exploring the relationship between the human body and political space.

While still an emerging artist she received several competitive scholarships, including the Jewish National Fund Sculpture Award (1993), the America–Israel Cultural Foundation Scholarship, and the Mary Fisher Award from the Bezalel Academy (1994), recognizing the originality of her early sculptural practice.

== Career ==
=== Early career (1993–2000) ===
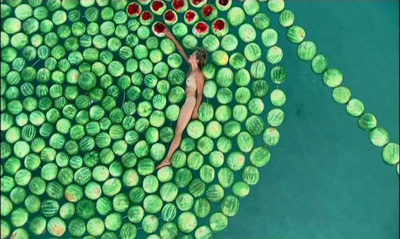
DeadSee 2005, 11:39 min

Landau emerged during the 1990s as one of a new generation of Israeli artists who shifted away from formalistic sculpture toward installation, performance, and multimedia practice. Her early works addressed the relationship between individual experience and broader political realities, frequently employing ordinary found objects transformed through unexpected materials and performative actions. Rather than producing autonomous sculptures, Landau increasingly conceived works as environments in which the body, architecture, landscape, and viewer became interconnected. These installations often examined vulnerability, exile, violence, migration, and cultural identity while drawing upon personal biography, Jewish history, and the social landscape of the Middle East. Her early exhibitions quickly established her reputation within Israel. She participated in major exhibitions including Export Surplus (1994), Transit (1994), Resident Alien (1996), Political Art of the Nineties (1998), Hebrew Work (1998), Tales of the Sand at the Fruitmarket Gallery in Edinburgh (1999), and Angel of History at the Herzliya Museum of Art (2000). During this formative period Landau also began exhibiting internationally, participating in museum exhibitions across Europe and North America. Her installations attracted attention for combining autobiographical narratives with broader questions concerning nomadity, homelessness, and identity. Critics noted her ability to transform familiar objects into psychologically charged symbols while employing performance and video to expand sculpture beyond conventional forms. Recognition came rapidly. In 1998 she received the prestigious Ingeborg Bachmann Scholarship established by Anselm Kiefer through the Wolf Foundation.

The following year she was selected as Artist-in-Residence at the Hoffmann Collection in Berlin, exposing her work to influential European curators and collectors. In 2000 she won the highly competitive Artangel/Times Commission in London, a landmark achievement that marked her emergence on the international contemporary art scene.

=== International recognition (2000–2012) ===
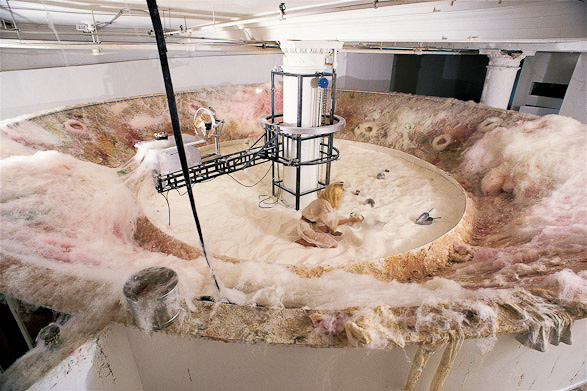
Thread Waxing Space installation, 2001

The first decade of the twenty-first century marked Landau's emergence as one of the most internationally recognized Israeli artists of her generation.

During this period she expanded her practice from gallery-based installations to ambitious site-specific projects, large-scale video works, and performances addressing the political, environmental, and cultural realities of the Middle East. Her work was increasingly exhibited in major museums and biennials throughout Europe, North America, and Asia, positioning her within the broader discourse of contemporary international art. Between 2001 and 2005, Landau participated in a succession of international exhibitions, including Installation at the Thread Waxing Space, New York City., Messages to the New Millennium at the Museum of Modern Art in Saitama, Japan, ArtFocus 4 in Jerusalem, Attack! Art and War in the Media Age at the Kunsthalle Wien, Dreaming Art / Dreaming Reality at the Tel Aviv Museum of Art, Wonder Women at FRAC Lorraine in France and Designing Truth at the Lehmbruck Museum in Germany.

During the late 2000s Landau's work was featured in several landmark international exhibitions, including Into Me / Out of Me at P.S.1 Contemporary Art Center (now MoMA PS1) in New York and later at the KW Institute for Contemporary Art in Berlin; Global Feminisms at the Brooklyn Museum; Real Time: Art in Israel 1998–2008 at the Israel Museum; elles@centrepompidou at the Centre Pompidou in Paris; Signs of Life at the Kunstmuseum Luzern; and Thrice Upon a Time at Magasin III in Stockholm. These exhibitions established her as one of the leading voices in contemporary installation and video art, particularly in discussions surrounding feminism, conflict, and the politics of the body.

=== The Dead Sea and the "Salt Works ===
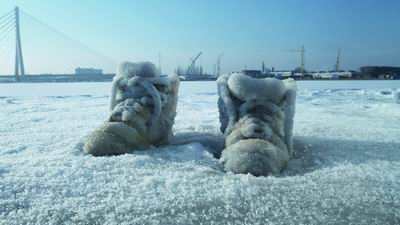
Salt Crystal Shoes on a Frozen Lake, 2011

Among Landau's most significant artistic achievements is her long-term exploration of the Dead Sea, a project that has occupied a central place in her practice since the early 2000s. Rather than using salt merely as a sculptural material, Landau employs the Dead Sea itself as an active solution in the creative process. The Dead Sea, situated at the lowest terrestrial point on Earth and shared by Israel, Jordan, and the Palestinian territories, functions simultaneously as a natural landscape, historical site, ecological system, and geopolitical border. For Landau it represents both a deeply personal landscape associated with childhood memories and a symbolic space embodying cultural division, environmental fragility, and transformation.

Her process involves submerging carefully selected objects including shoes, fishing nets and everyday domestic items in the hypersaline waters of the Dead Sea. Over periods ranging from several weeks to several months, naturally forming salt crystals gradually envelop the objects, transforming them into luminous white sculptural forms. Because each crystallization process depends upon changing environmental conditions, no two works develop identically. Landau has described these works as collaborations with nature rather than acts of artistic execution. The resulting sculptures preserve traces of their former function while becoming geological objects that evoke archaeology, memory, ritual, preservation, and loss. Art historians have frequently interpreted the Salt Works as meditations on transformation, resilience, and the capacity of nature to simultaneously preserve and erase human history.

The Salt Works have become among the most widely recognized bodies of work produced by any contemporary Israeli artist and have been exhibited internationally in museums and galleries throughout Europe, North America, and Asia. Publications such as Sigalit Landau (Hatje Cantz, 2008), One Man's Floor is Another Man's Feelings (2011) and Salt Years (2019) have documented the project's artistic and conceptual development.

=== Performance, video and the body ===
Alongside her sculptural practice, Landau has consistently employed performance and video as primary artistic media. Her works frequently place the artist's own body within physically demanding or psychologically charged environments, using repetitive actions to explore vulnerability, endurance, political violence, borders, and the relationship between the individual and collective history.

Among her best-known video works is DeadSee (2005), in which hundreds of watermelons joined together in a spiral float across the surface of the Dead Sea while the artist slowly moves within the formation. The work has become one of the most widely disseminated works of contemporary Israeli video art and has been interpreted as an allegory of fragmentation, survival, ecological precarity, and coexistence.

Another well-known video work, Barbed Hula (1999), also centers on the artist's naked body, depicting her swiveling a hula hoop made of barbed wire on the Tel Aviv-Yafo coastline. With each rotation around her waist, the wire repeatedly threatens to cut into her skin.

=== The 54th Venice Biennale ===
In 2011 Landau represented Israel at the 54th Venice Biennale, one of the highest distinctions accorded to an Israeli contemporary artist. Her exhibition, One Man's Floor is Another Man's Feelings, presented an installation integrating sculpture, video, sound, and architectural intervention. The exhibition explored themes that had occupied Landau throughout her career: borders, salt, memory, labour, conflict, and the fragile relationship between individuals and landscapes shaped by political history. Rather than presenting discrete artworks, the Israeli Pavilion functioned as a unified experiential environment in which visitors encountered interconnected installations examining the emotional and physical consequences of territorial division. The exhibition received substantial international critical attention and significantly enhanced Landau's global reputation. It confirmed her position among the leading figures of contemporary installation art while reinforcing the Dead Sea as one of the defining conceptual landscapes of her artistic practice. During the same period Landau participated in major international exhibitions including the Yokohama Triennale, the Busan Biennale, the Incheon Women Artists Biennale, the Martin-Gropius-Bau in Berlin, MOCAK in Kraków, the Bass Museum of Art in Miami and the Musée d'Art Contemporain de Rochechouart.

== Permanent collections ==
Landau's works are held in numerous public and private collections internationally, reflecting her prominence within contemporary art. Her installations, sculptures, photographs and video works have been acquired by leading museums in Europe, North America and Israel. Among the institutions holding works by Landau are the Museum of Modern Art, Centre Pompidou, Hirshhorn Museum and Sculpture Garden, Barcelona Museum of Contemporary Art (MACBA), Jewish Museum, Magasin III Museum for Contemporary Art, Israel Museum, and the Tel Aviv Museum of Art. Her work is also represented in the collections of the German Bundestag Art Collection and the Museum of Contemporary Art in Kraków (MOCAK).

In addition to public museums, Landau's work has entered several private collections, including the Pomeranz Collection and the Julia Stoschek collection and The Rubell Family Collection as well as other internationally recognized collections of contemporary art. The broad institutional representation of her work reflects her sustained international reputation and the critical significance of her multidisciplinary practice.

== Awards and recognition ==
- 1993 Jewish National Fund Sculpture Award
- 1994 America-Israel Cultural Fund
- 1994 Mary Fisher Prize, Bezalel Academy of Arts and Design, Jerusalem
- 1996 Ineborg Bachman Scholarship
- 1998 Artist in Residence at the Hoffmann Collection, Berlin, Germany
- 1999 First Prize in the British Competition by ArtAngel and London newspaper "The Times"
- 2001 Acquisition Prize, Tel Aviv Museum of Art, Tel Aviv
- 2001 Prize for a Young Artist, Israeli Ministry of Science, Culture and Sport
- 2003 America-Israel Cultural Foundation Janet and George Jaffin Scholarship Prize
- 2003 Residency, IASPIS – The International Artists Studio Program, Stockholm
- 2004 Nathan Gottesdiener Foundation, The Israeli Art Prize, Tel Aviv Museum of Art, Tel Aviv
- 2004 Beatrice S. Kolliner Award for Young Israeli Artist, Israel Museum, Jerusalem
- 2007 The Dan Sandel and the Sandel Family Foundation Sculpture Award, Tel Aviv Museum of Art
- 2012 'Artis' Grant Recipient
- 2016 The Sandberg Prize for Israeli Art, Israel Museum, Jerusalem
- 2017 Honorary Doctoral Degree, Ben-Gurion University of the Negev, Beersheba
- 2022 – Honorary Doctorate, The Hebrew University of Jerusalem
- 2023 – Honorary Doctorate, Bar-Ilan University
- 2025 – Richard & Ellen Sandor Israeli Arts & Culture Prize

== Gallery ==
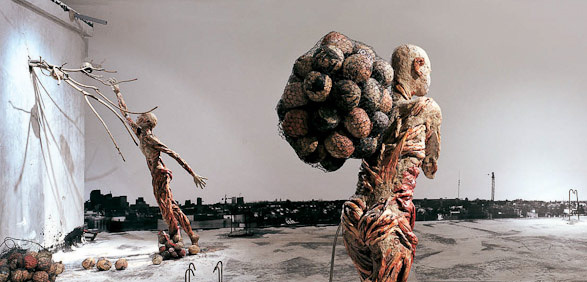
The Country (Installation view), 2002
Alon Segev Gallery, Tel Aviv-Yafo

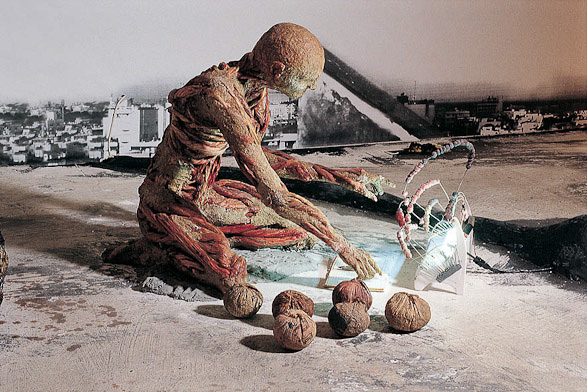
The Recorder of Days and Fruit, 2002
from "The Country", Alon Segev Gallery, Tel Aviv-Yafo

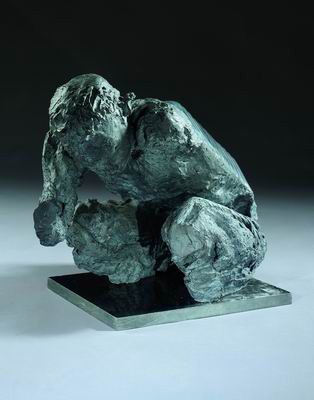
Rose Bleed, 2003
Israel Museum, Jerusalem
B06.0207

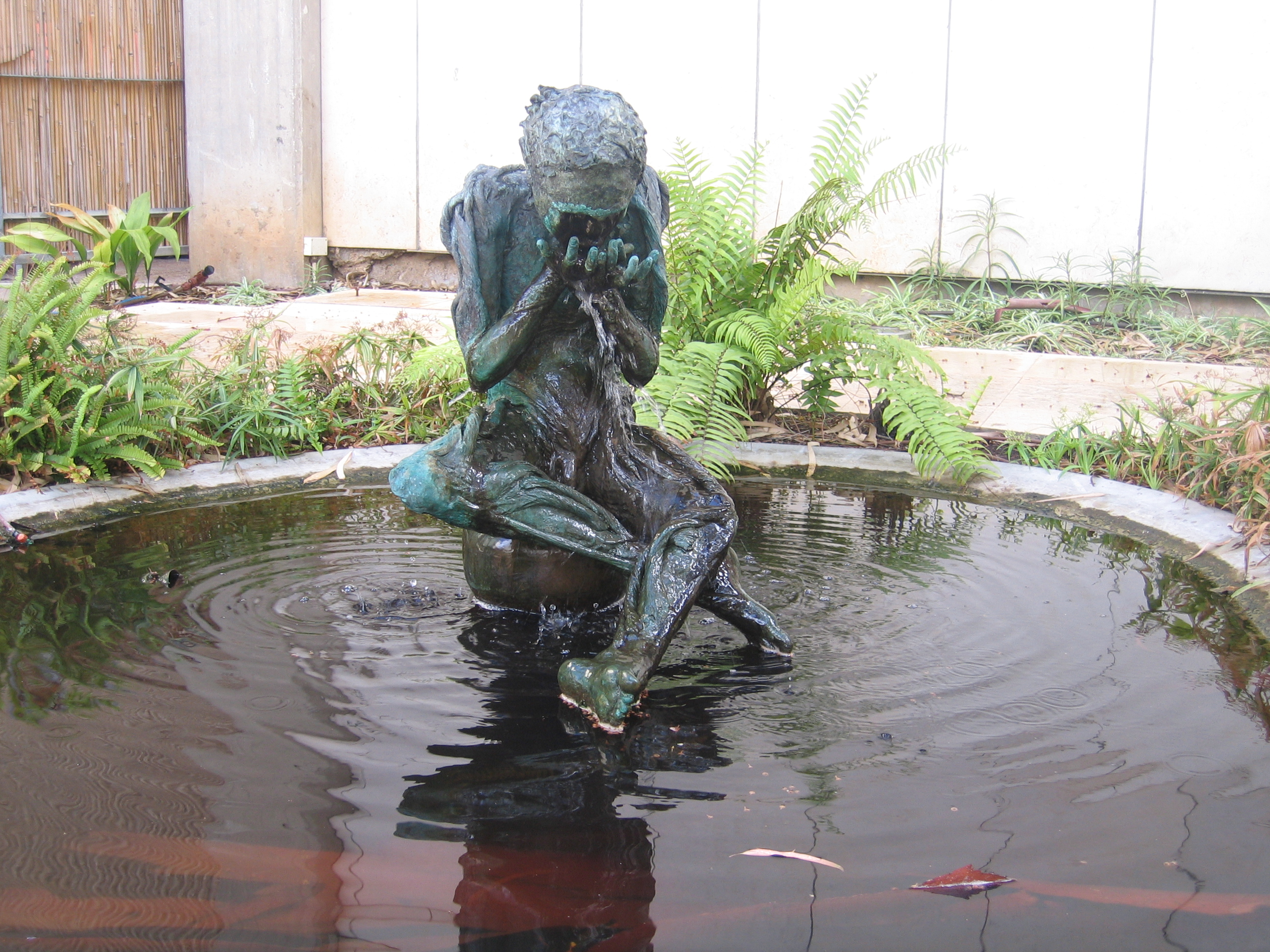
Cry Boy, Cry, 2004
Tel Aviv Museum of Art

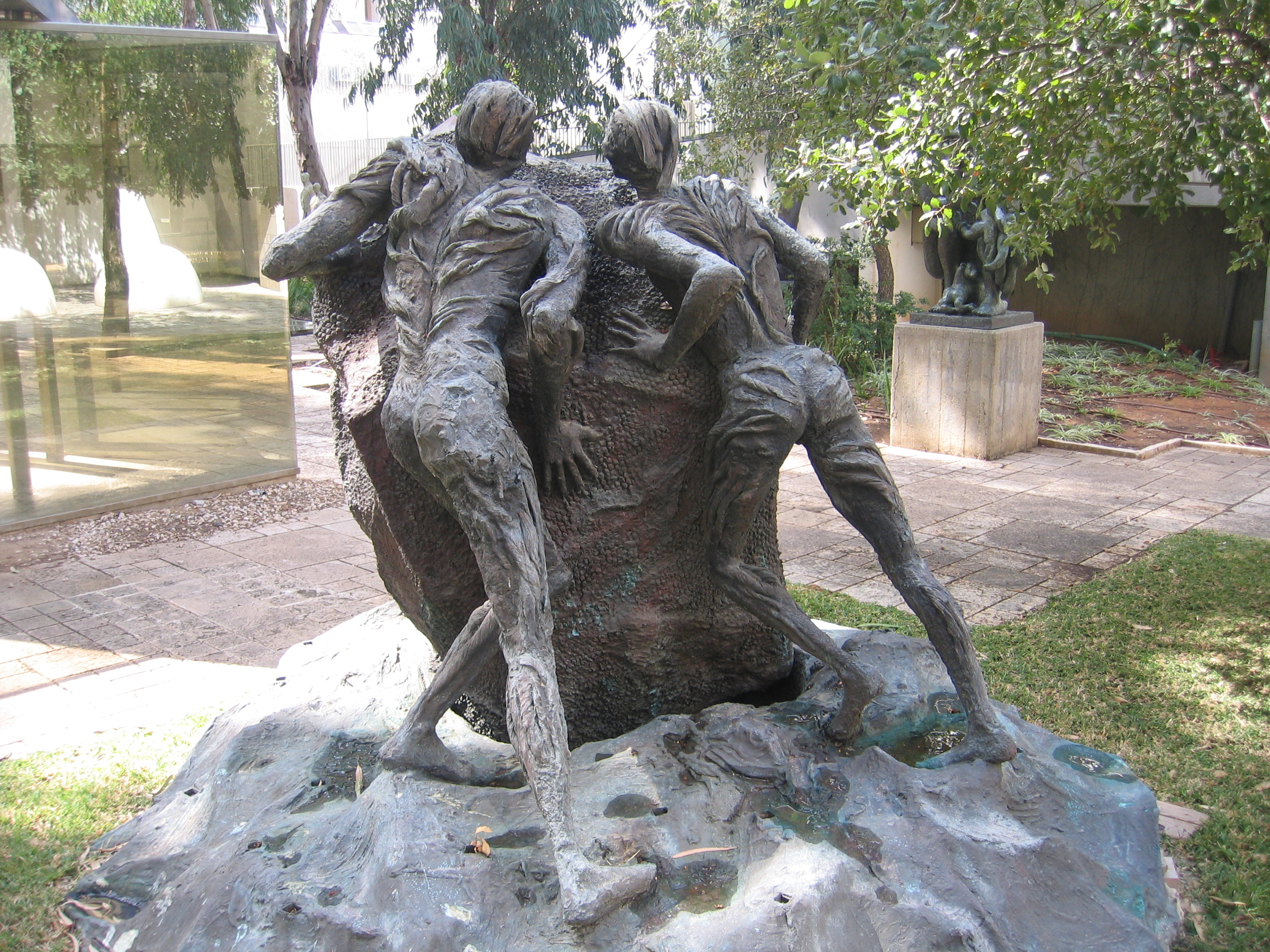
Sisyphus and Jacob, 2005
Tel Aviv Museum of Art

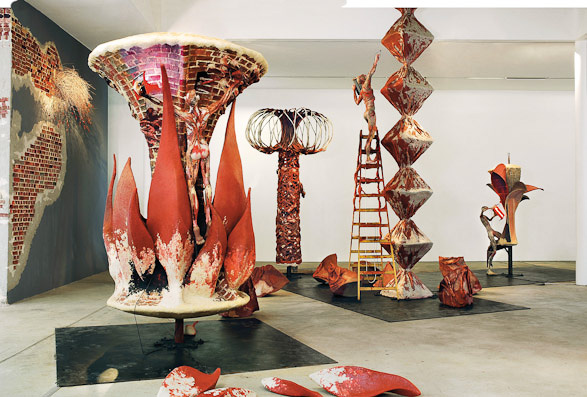
The Dining Hall (Installation view), 2007
KW Institute for Contemporary Art, Berlin

== See also ==
- Visual arts in Israel
