= VHV Group =

German insurance and reinsurance company

- Industry: Insurance
- Headquarters: Hannover, Germany
- Number of employees: 4,033 (2022)
- Website: www.vhv-gruppe.de

German logo

VHV Group (United Hanoverian Insurance Group; in German: Vereinigte Hannoversche Versicherung) is a German insurance and reinsurance company based in Hanover, specialising in provision non-life and life insurance as well. Its core businesses are all insurance services. Today VHV Group operates primarily in Europe, Middle East and East Asia and especially in Germany, Switzerland, Italy, France, Austria and Turkey. VHV is one of the twenty most important insurance companies in Germany, the leading German insurance company in the construction sector (market share of 23.6 percent) and one of the five major car insurance companies in Germany. Moreover, the VHV Group is the leading risk life insurer in Germany. VHV Group owns a network of subsidiaries, branches (e.g. Hamburg, Munich, Berlin, Cologne) and representative offices with a total staff of roughly 4,000, including 2,400 employees in Hanover. Due to the earning power of the VHV-Group and its capitalization level Standard and Poor's raised the rating on A+ Level in April 2017. In 2016 the VHV was able to expand its contractual figures to over 10 million insurance contracts for the first time.

== History ==
=== Development until 2003 - independent companies ===
The essential insurance companies, which belong to the VHV group are founded in 1875 and 1919 as mutual insurance companies. The "VHV" was established as a self-help institution for the construction industry in 1919. Today VHV is the market leader in the field of construction and is also known as an insurer of major projects such as the Elbphilharmonie, Düsseldorf Stadtbahn or the Reichstag building. In 1937, motor vehicle insurance was introduced at the VHV, which has developed into one of the most important lines of business today. In the 1950s, more than 24,000 companies signed an insurance policy with the VHV. This turned VHV insurance into the second largest liability insurer in Germany. In order to insure cross-border construction projects in Austria, VHV founded its subsidiary VAV in 1973. In 1991, VHV successfully established the guarantee service, which in particular allows clients of the construction industry to increase their financial scope. The "hanoverian life insurance" (in German: Hannoversche)has emerged from the Prussian Official Association in 1875 and is known as Germany's oldest direct insurer. In 1935, the VHV Life insurance also opened for people who were not Prussian officials. Each brand consists of independent companies. In 2003 both companies merged and became the VHV Group.

=== Development 2004-2009 - restructuring ===
In 2004 the special insurer VHV Lebensversicherung AG was founded. As a result of restructuring after the merger, VHV solutions GmbH was founded in 2005. VHV solutions is the central service company of the group and is responsible for claims settlement and contract handling. In 2006 VHV acquired the Wave Management AG headquartered in Hamburg, which carries out the group's asset management. The group's asset management company, WAVE Management Inc., invests the funds that are generated by the insurance companies. In order to enter the direct insurance market, the Hannoversche Direktversicherung AG, was founded and since autumn 2007, it has also been selling motor vehicle products especially via internet. In 2007, VHV also founded the Al Ahli Takaful Company in Jeddah City, Saudi Arabia, as a joint venture with the National Commercial Bank and the FWU. In 2008 the VHV Group entered the French insurance market. In addition, a stake of 7.4 percent was acquired in the Swiss insurance company Nationale Suisse in 2008, which was the basis for a long-term cooperation. Due to the rising number of customers and employees, a new headquarter was built at VHV-Platz 1, which was completed in 2009.

=== Development since 2009 - digitization and internationalization ===
Since 2009 the VHV has strengthened its internationalization tendencies in order to reduce its dependency on the German insurance market. In 2011 the Wave Management AG moved to Hannover and concentrated its business activities there. Since 2012 VHV Group has had a liaison office in Turkey for 3 years, which has resulted in experience and overview regarding Turkish insurance market. In the Italian insurance market, VHV is intensifying its cooperation with the insurance company ITAS. In 2015 VHV-Group founded a reinsurance company, VHV Reasürans AŞ, in Istanbul to enter the Turkish insurance market. Moreover, the VHV Lebensversicherung was merged in 2015 with the Hannoverschen Lebensversicherung in order to reduce costs, which arise as a result of regulatory requirements. In 2015 the VHV Group was the first important car insurance company in Germany, which offered a telematics tariff. In addition the VHV Group is cooperating with various insurtechs e.g. wefox since 2017. In order to increase cost efficiency, Hannoversche Direktversicherung 2017 was merged with VHV Allgemeine Versicherung. At the same time, the largest digitization project "go digital" in the company's history was started. For the first time in 2017, more than 3 billion premiums were collected. One-third of the premiums are for life insurance and two-thirds for non-life insurance.

== Subsidiaries ==
Logo of the VAV

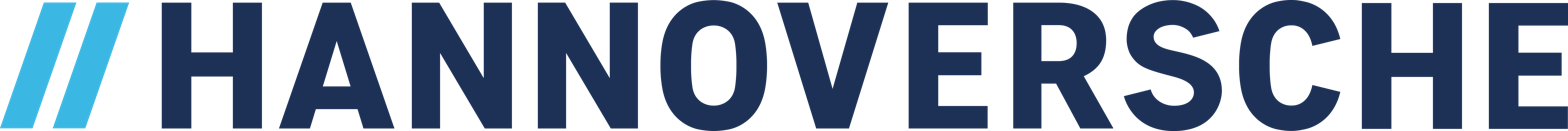
Logo of the Hannoversche

The VHV is a multi-brand group. The main subsidiaries of the group include:

- VHV Holding AG, Hannover (VHV Holding AG controls the strategic development and focus of the group.)
- Hannoversche Lebensversicherung AG, Hannover (Hannoversche Lebensversicherung AG is the leading risk-life insurer in Germany.)
- VHV Allgemeine Versicherung AG, Hannover (The "VHV Allgemeine" is the composite insurance company of the VHV group.)
- WAVE Management AG, Hannover (Wave Management AG is the VHV Group's capital investments company.)
- VAV Versicherungs-AG, Vienna (VAV is a provider of non-life insurance in the Austrian market.)
- VHV Reasürans AŞ, Istanbul (VHV Reasürans is a reinsurance company, which mainly operates in Turkey.)
- VHV Allgemeine Sigorta AŞ, Istanbul, (VHV Allgemeine Sigorta AŞ is a local primary insurer, which is specialized in Construction and Liability insurance.)
- Hannoversche Direktversicherung AG
- VHV solutions GmbH, Hannover (VHV solutions is the group's central service company, bringing together all contract processing and claims settlement processes.)
- VVH Versicherungsvermittlung Hannover GmbH (VVH Versicherungsvermittlung is an insurance broker operating throughout Germany.)
- Assicuratrice Val Piave SpA, Belluno
- InterEurope AG European Law Service AG, Düsseldorf
- Eucon, Münster
- VHV digital service AG, Hannover

== Significant shareholdings ==
VHV holds a 34.02 per cent stake as a shareholder in NRV Rechtsschutz AG, located in Mannheim, which primarily offers legal expenses insurances. In addition the VHV is a shareholder of the E+S Reinsurance since 1995. Since 2000, VHV has held a 25 percent stake in Deutsche Rück Schweiz AG. The VHV has a sponsoring membership in the Italian ITAS insurance group. Both companies develop services and products especially for the Italian market. VHV has acquired a 75 percent share in the data specialist Eucon, based in Münster. The aim is to build up the business with insurance-related services.

== Products ==
VHV provides various composite insurance in the areas of property, liability, casualty and technical insurance as well as motor vehicle insurance. Moreover, credit insurance and cyber insurance are sold. Further VHV is the only German insurance company, which offers a ten-year warranty insurance (R.C. Décennale) according to French law. VHV Versicherungen's main sales channels are brokers/agencies (more than 14.000) as well as specialized inhouse sales force for their clients from the construction industry. In contrast, Hannover Life Insurance mainly sells its products directly via the Internet. In 2015,2017,2018, and 2019 VHV was one of the most popular German insurance brands.

== Management ==
The chairman of the VHV Group has been Thomas Voigt since 2022. The chairman of the Supervisory Board has been Uwe H. Reuter since 2023.

== Foundation ==
Since December 1, 2014 a VHV Foundation promotes projects in the fields of education, integration, culture and science.
