= Albert York =

American painter

Albert York (1928–2009) was an American painter. He lived and worked in New York from 1952 until his death in 2009. He has been represented exclusively by Davis & Langdale Company, Inc. in New York since 1963.

York painted the beauty he saw, once telling an interviewer, "I think we live in a Paradise... This is a Garden of Eden."

Michael Brenson of The New York Times described him as a "reclusive painter of deliberate, dreamlike landscapes, still lifes, and portraits."

In his book Tell Them I Said No (Sternberg Press, 2016), the author Martin Herbert includes a chapter on Albert York.
