= Israel Hershberg =

Austrian-born Israeli artist (born 1948)

Israel Hershberg ישראל הרשברג
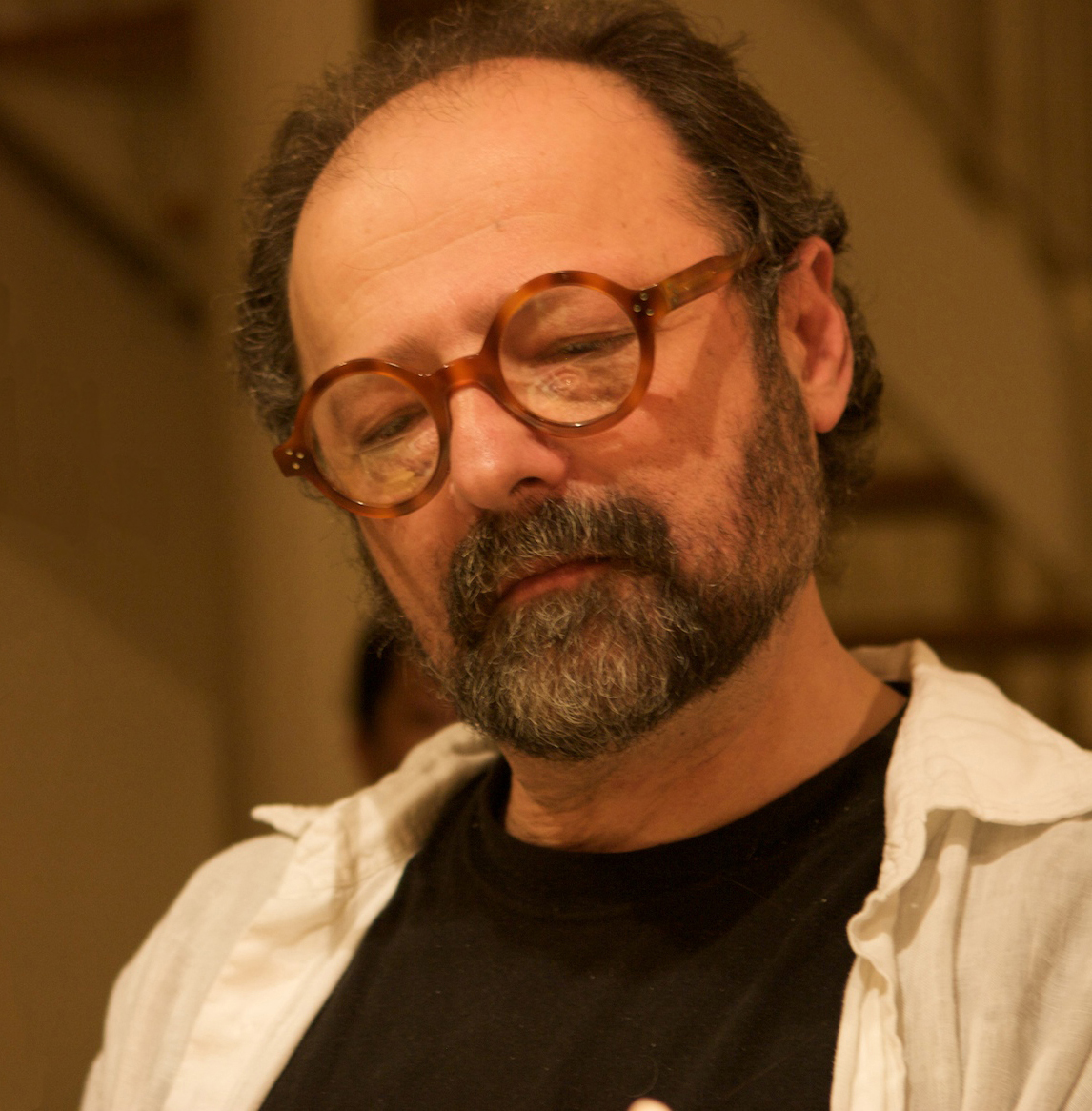
- Israel Hershberg
- Born: 1948; Linz, Austria
- Education: Pratt Institute, New York City
- Known for: Painting
- Movement: Israeli art

Israel Hershberg (Hebrew: ישראל הרשברג; born 1948) is a figurative painter who lives and works in Jerusalem. Hershberg is the director and founder of the Jerusalem Studio School.

== Biography ==
Israel Hershberg was born in 1948 in a displaced persons camp in Linz, Austria. In 1949, he immigrated to Israel. In 1958, he moved with his parents to the United States, where he attended the Brooklyn Museum School, Brooklyn, NY from 1966 to 1968. In 1972, he received a Bachelor of Fine Arts, Pratt Institute, Brooklyn, New York. In 1973 he received his Master of Fine Arts from State University of New York, Albany, New York. From 1973 to 1984 he taught painting and drawing at the Maryland Institute College of Art, and in 1984, he taught at the New York Academy of Art. That year, he moved to Israel with his wife and family.

== Artistic career ==
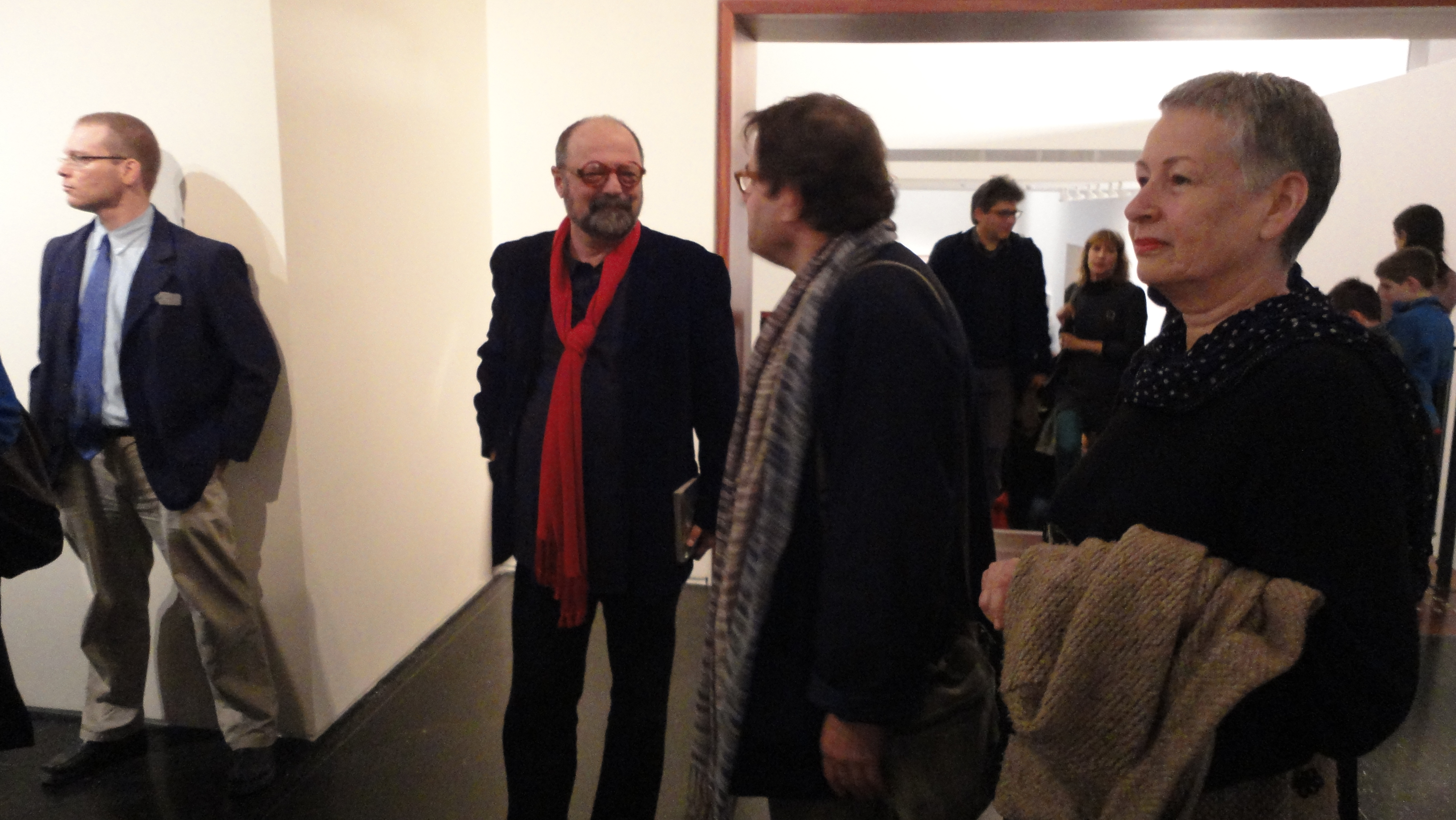
Hershberg at opening of solo exhibition in Israel Museum

In 1998, Hershberg founded the Jerusalem Studio School, a private art school in Jerusalem's Talpiot neighborhood that offers intensive training in drawing and painting within the figurative art tradition. It is considered to be the first school established in Israel to teach realist painting based on observation in the tradition of the Old Masters. Hershberg heads the school's “master class” program and is the artistic director of the JSS.

In 2014, Hershberg founded JSS in Civita - Summer Art School and Residency in Italy, a summer art program in Civita Castellana, Italy.

Hershberg believes that for a true painter, "reality is a continual feast, a never-ending delight to the eyes." He quotes Albert York, who said "I think we live in a Paradise. . . . This is a Garden of Eden."

Hershberg's work is included in private and public collections internationally. Israel Hershberg is represented by the Marlborough Gallery in New York, and lives and works in Jerusalem, Israel.

== Awards and recognition ==
Hershberg was the recipient of a Ford Foundation scholarship in 1980. He was awarded the Sandberg Prize for Israeli Art in 1991 and the Tel Aviv Museum prize for Israeli Art in 1998. His work has been purchased by the Israel Museum in Jerusalem, the Tel Aviv Museum of Art, the Jewish Museum in New York City and the National Gallery of Canada in Ottawa.

== Gallery ==
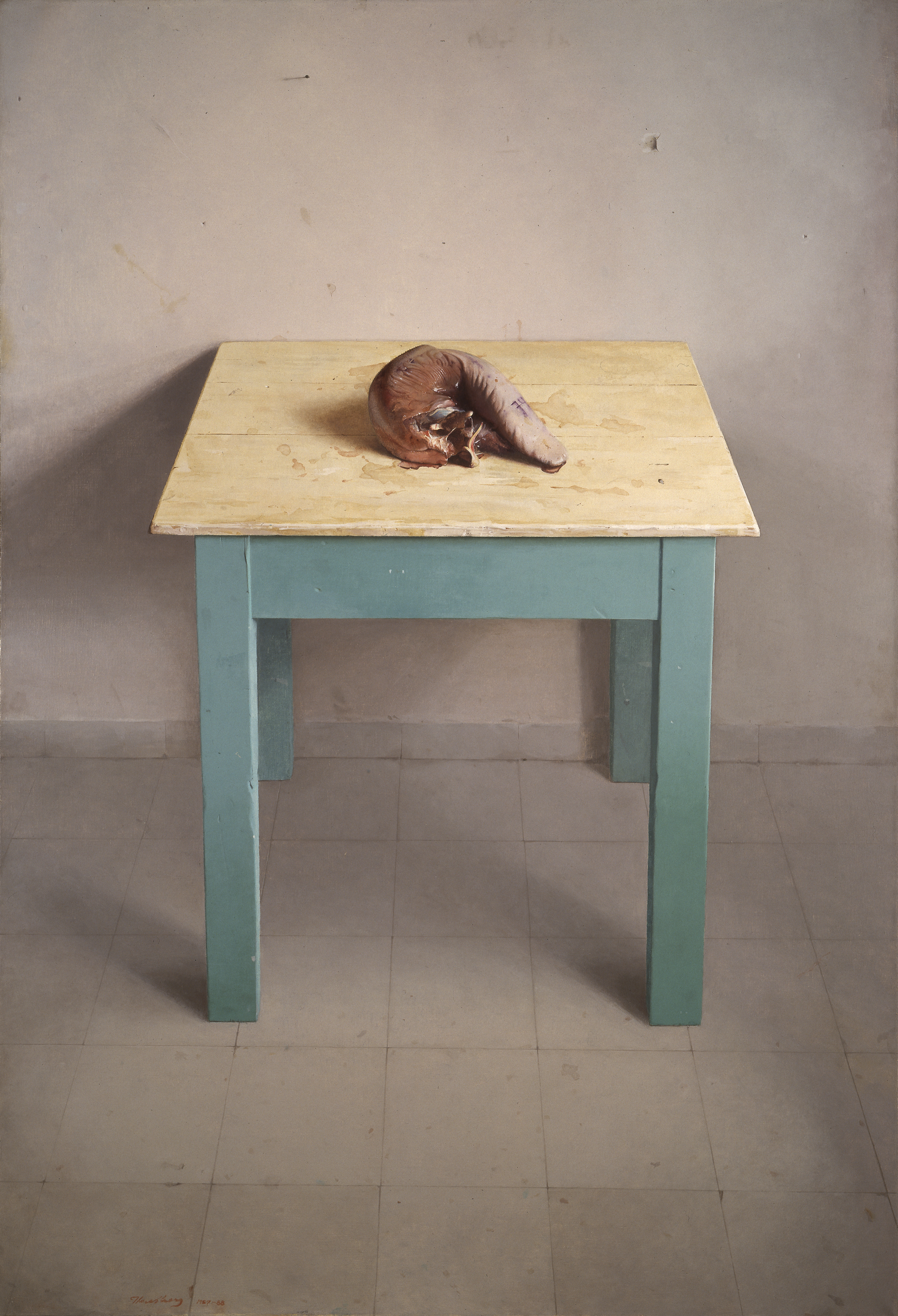
Cow's Tongue No. 74, 1987-88
Israel Museum Collection
B88.0151

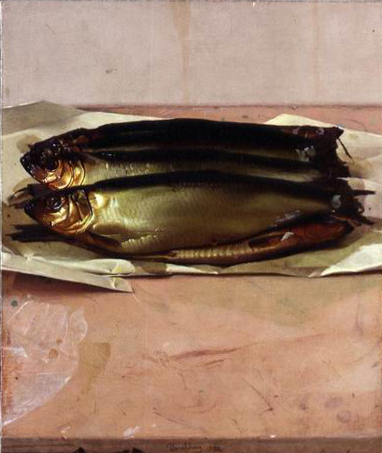
Seven Smoked Fish on a Grinding Slab, 1992
Israel Museum Collection
B94.0763

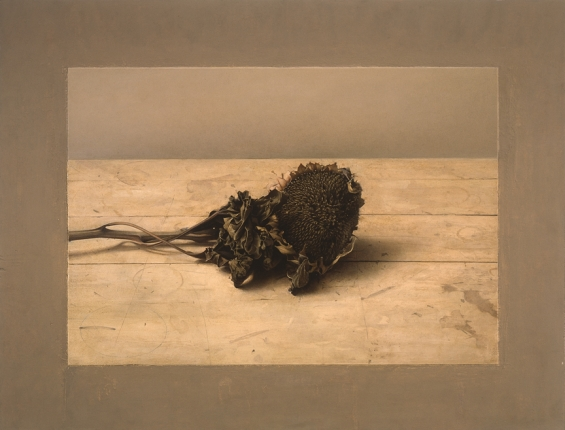
"Nova II" (1993), Oil on paper mounted on wood, 62.5 x 82 cm.

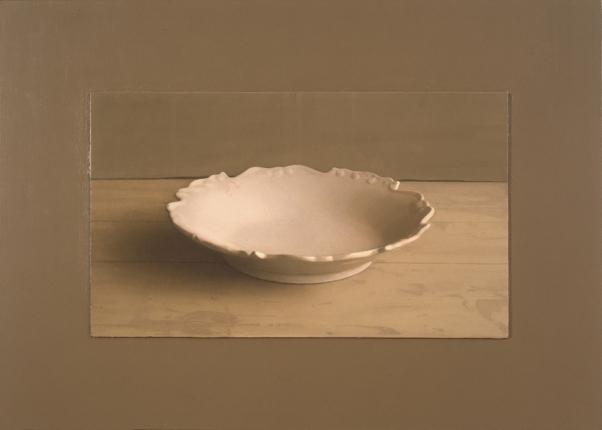
"Penumbrian Bowl" (2003), Oil on linen and wood, 25.5 x 35.7 cm

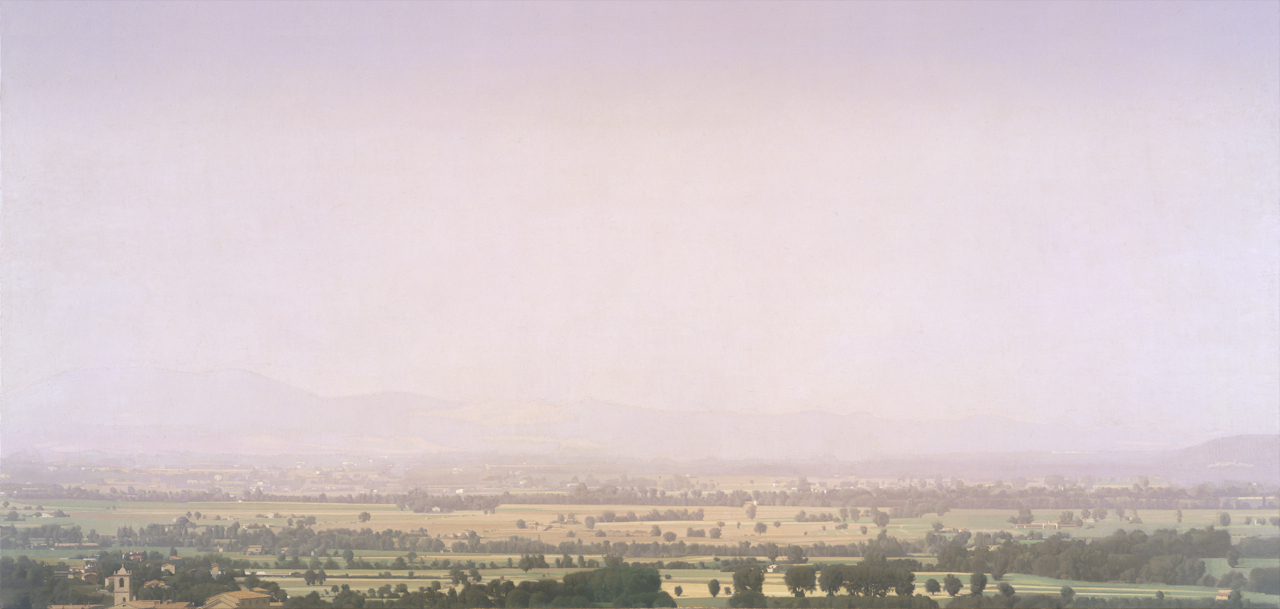
"Aria Umbra" (2003-2004), Oil on linen, 119 x 250 cm. Collection: Israel Museum, Jerusalem

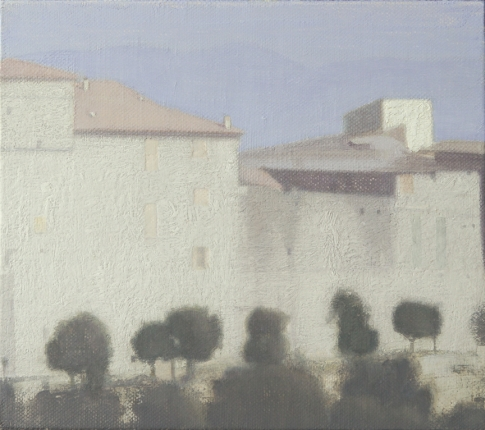
"Fratta Todina From Afar" (2005), Oil on linen mounted on wood, 23.1 x 26.2 cm.

== See also ==
- Visual arts in Israel
