= Pietro Caproni =

Pietro Paulo Caproni (1862–1928) was founder and co-owner of PP Caproni & Brother, Boston, Massachusetts, manufacturers of plaster reproductions of classical and contemporary statues. These 'cast' reproductions were, in an era before commercial photography, an integral educational tool in teaching people the history of art and antiquities. The brother in the company's name was Pietro's brother, Emilio.

The firm supplied art schools, major universities and museums in the United States and abroad with quality reproductions. It operated under their ownership between 1892 and 1927, the year the company was sold and a year before Pietro's death.

Before World War II major United States museums had cast collections, including the Metropolitan Museum of Art in New York City and Boston's Museum of Fine Arts. Although Caproni did not supply these museums with their casts, he did supply other museums with their casts, including the William J. Battle Collection at the University of Texas, the George Walter Vincent Smith Museum in Springfield, Massachusetts, and the Portland Art Museum in Portland, Oregon.

University collections that the Caproni firm installed included those at Harvard University, Yale University, Princeton University, Cornell University, and Emory University. Art schools such as the Pennsylvania Academy of Fine Arts used Caproni casts as models for their art students to draw from.

Additional installations of Caproni casts were in leading hotels, theaters, and concert halls. The Loews theatre chains of the early 19th century featured Caproni casts, as did Boston's Symphony Hall and the atmospheric theaters designed by John Eberson.

Rising sculptors of the time sought the expertise of the Caproni studios when creating some of the country's best known civic sculpture. Among them was Cyrus Edwin Dallin, whose Appeal to the Great Spirit and Paul Revere, both of which are standing in Boston, were modeled in the Caproni studios' basement. Other notable artists who worked with Caproni Brothers include Daniel Chester French, Loredo Taft, and Leonard Craske which was made famous on TV commercials for 'Gordon's of Gloucester' fish sticks in the 1970s and 1980s. Caproni worked with these sculptors to model the original plasters before they went to a bronze foundry to be cast.

When Pietro Caproni arrived in Boston in the 1870s he was apprenticed to Paul A Garey, whose plaster statuary company dated back to 1834. Pietro and Emilio bought the company in 1892 and quickly starting building a new studio and workspace at 8 Newcomb Street in Roxbury. In 1896 they purchased two brownstone buildings around the corner at 1920 Washington Street, and connected all three buildings with a 5,000-square-foot (460 m^{2}) gallery space to showcase their work. By 1900 the two brownstone buildings facing Washington Street were re-faced to appear as one building and an enclosed bridge connected them to the Newcomb Street building behind. The company issued catalogues most every year from 1892 to 1915. Hard-cover catalogues were published in 1901 and 1911, the latter being the largest and most complete catalogue ever published by the company and used by schools as a guide to identifying antiquities. After 1915, soft-cover catalogues were published in 1922 and 1928. The company changed its ownership and its name frequently between 1928 and 1950s, as most of its owners fell into receivership because of poor sales and declining interest in what were widely perceived as "only copies". Lino Giust bought the Washington Street buildings in 1970 and operated them as the Giust Gallery until his retirement in 1995. Today the buildings comprise condominium apartments.

Caproni casts can be identified by a metal hallmark imbedded into the base of the cast. Early casts have brass hallmarks bearing "PP CAPRONI & BROTHER PLASTIC ARTS, BOSTON, MA." In later years the medium changed to aluminum. In 1932 the company changed its name to Caproni Galleries, Inc and supplied Disney with plaster figurines of all the Disney characters. Amadeo Nardini, owner of a casting company that specialized in ecclesiastical subjects, bought the company around 1940 and ran it under the name Caproni Galleries of Amadeo.

Pietro was born in Barga, Italy and left Italy for Boston in the late 1870s. His first marriage to Jane M. Stayner produced four children and the marriage ended in divorce. His second wife and later widow, Gertrude Brinkhaus, was an advocate of art in Public Schools and later saw through her husband's wish to bequest a Maternity Wing to the Barga Hospital, at the time the largest private gift to the Italian people, as acknowledged by Benito Mussolini. Pietro and Gertrude are buried at Forest Hills Cemetery in Boston's Jamaica Plain neighborhood. The Sleeping and Awakening Lion statues are based on Antonio Canova's design for the Tomb of Pope Clement XIII in Rome.

In 1993, Robert Shure purchased the entire Caproni Collection and the business rights to the Giust Gallery. Until 2003, the Washington Street address was still rented from Mr. Giust although most of the pieces were cast at a new location offsite since 1993. In 2006, a small gallery was set up at 105 Salem Street in Woburn Massachusetts where the pieces are all made by hand continuing to use traditional methods of plaster casting and are shipped all over the world. The new owner, Robert Shure, a plaster cast and bronze expert, restoration expert, and sculptor in his own right, has recovered many more original vintage Caproni casts and greatly enlarged the collection. The company is now flourishing and has supplemented the cast collections of many locations including the Pennsylvania Academy of Fine Arts and The Jerusalem Studio School in Israel. They have also recently added the full sized Victory of Samothrace back into the collection and a copy now occupies the Darwin D. Martin House (designed by Frank Lloyd Wright) in Buffalo, New York as a replacement for the original one placed there by Mr. Wright. Art schools and ateliers across the USA and beyond now use their anatomical casts for their drawing/sculpting classes. Discerning designers and collectors of historical casts are also among those who collect these museum quality castings.
