= Artis (non-profit company) =

Organization that supports contemporary artists from Israel

Artis (Hebrew: ארטיס; Arabic: أرتيس) is an independent nonprofit organization in New York City that supports contemporary artists from Israel whose work addresses aesthetic, social and political questions to inspire reflection and debate.

== History ==
Rivka Saker, Chairman of Sotheby's Israel, founded Artis in 2004 to create a network of resources for contemporary artists from Israel. Artis hired its first Executive Director, Yael Reinharz, in 2008 and has since hosted art professionals in Israel, awarded grants to artists and exhibitions, presented public programs and commissions with organizations such as the New Museum, Performa, Swiss Institute, Tate Modern, Museum of Contemporary Art, Los Angeles; mentored artists in career development, and produced video interviews with artists and other resources available on its website.

In 2007, Artis organized its first research trip to Israel for curators and writers, leading to solo exhibitions of work by artists Yael Bartana at MoMA PS1 and Sigalit Landau at MoMA, and to articles in The New York Times, Frieze, Artforum and the Art Newspaper. Artis takes part in the dialogue around the Palestinian Campaign for the Academic and Cultural Boycott of Israel. In 2015, Artis commissioned an essay by Chen Tamir, subsequently published in Hyperallergic about the history of the boycott. In 2015, Artis announced a $1 million gift from an anonymous donor, enabling the establishment of a base in Tel Aviv and direct grants to artists. In 2018, Artis launched an International Artist Residency Grant Program to support artists who have been accepted into international residency programs.
