= Alon Segev Gallery =

Coordinates: 32.05000°N 34.76574°E

- גלריה אלון שגב
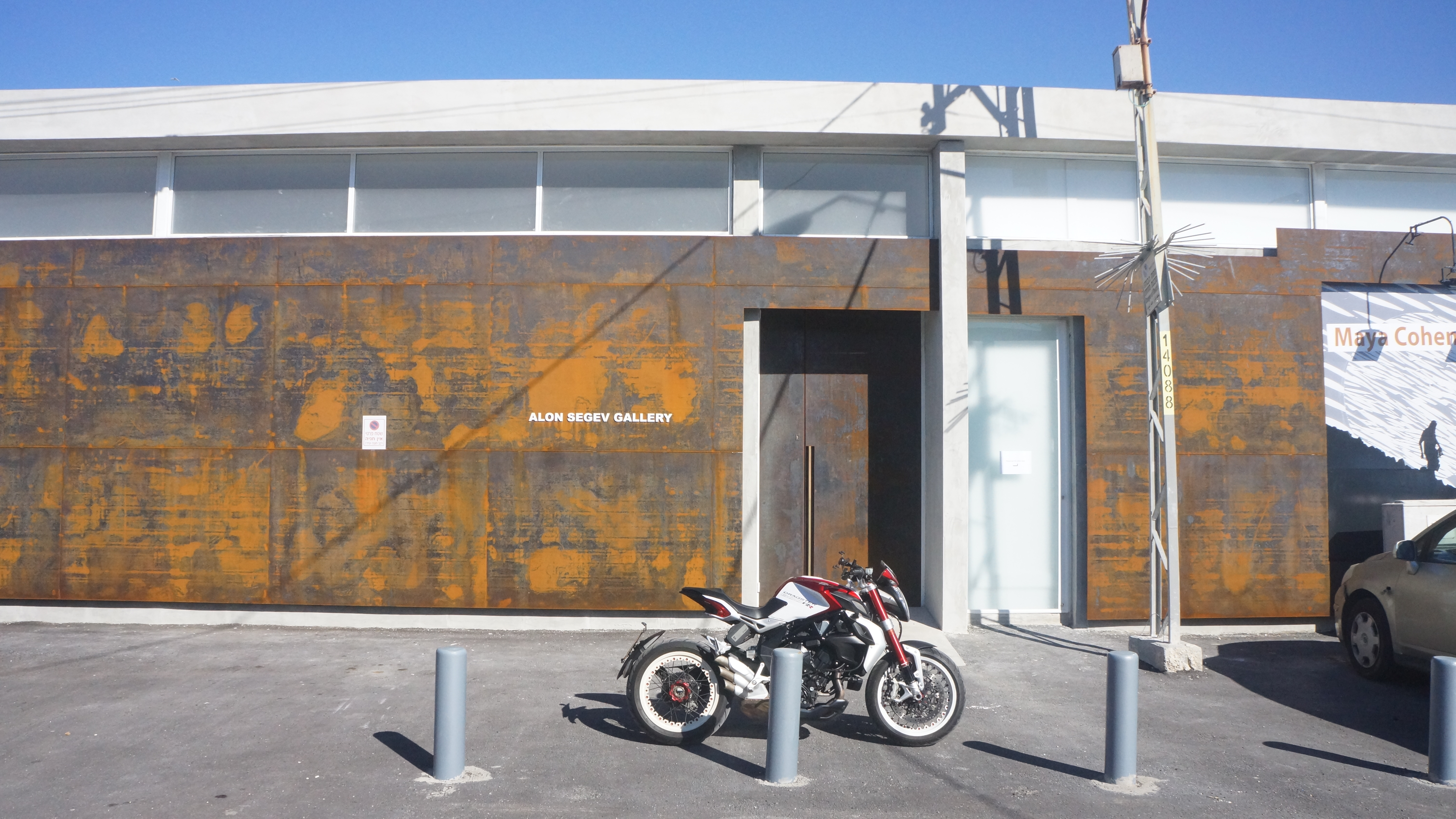
- Established: 2000
- Location: Tel Aviv, Israel
- Type: Contemporary art gallery

Alon Segev Gallery (Hebrew: גלריה אלון שגב) is a contemporary art gallery based in Tel Aviv, Israel representing both Israeli and International artists.

Alon Segev Gallery was established in 2000. It has represented contemporary artists including Sigalit Landau, and Arik Levy.

== See also ==
- Art in Tel Aviv
