= Jerusalem Studio School =

Art school in Jerusalem, Israel

Coordinates: 31°45′13.57″N 35°12′52.42″E

The Jerusalem Studio School is a private art school located in Jerusalem, Israel. Founded by artist Israel Hershberg in 1998, the Jerusalem Studio School offers rigorous training in drawing and painting within the figurative art tradition. It is the first school in Israel that focuses on realist painting.

== Programs ==
The Jerusalem Studio School offers full-time training in its "master class", a two- to four-year program with a primary emphasis on drawing and painting the human figure. The class is composed of roughly 40 applicants from Israel and abroad that are chosen for outstanding talent, commitment and motivation. Students work five days a week in north-lit studios with the option of continued study in the evenings. There are also seven independent studios for advanced students. The focus of study is on working from the live model, though students also work on still-life, landscape, copying from the old masters, and compositional themes. Studies are augmented by an evening lecture series, exhibitions and demonstrations from visiting artists throughout the academic year.

The Jerusalem Studio School also offers part-time study in drawing and painting in its Continuing Studies Program, with no prior experience required. In the spring, the school holds the Jerusalem Landscape Painting Marathon, a two-week workshop open to the public and taught by a visiting artist. It also organizes courses of study in the summer, both in Jerusalem and in Italy.

== Hall of Casts ==
The Jerusalem Studio School "Hall of Casts" is an on-site gallery collection of 33 plaster casts which span nearly 3000 years of art history, representing examples of sculptures by Donatello, Michelangelo, and Luca della Robbia along with ancient Roman and Greek sculptures. The only such cast collection in Israel, they were obtained from the Giust Gallery in Woburn, MA, which specializes in exclusive replicas from original Pietro Caproni molds. Acquired for educational purposes within the school programs, the collection can also be visited by the public.*

Graduates of the school have been described as "first rate painters."

== See also ==
- Visual arts in Israel
